= Alesani River =

River in the department of Haute-Corse, Corsica

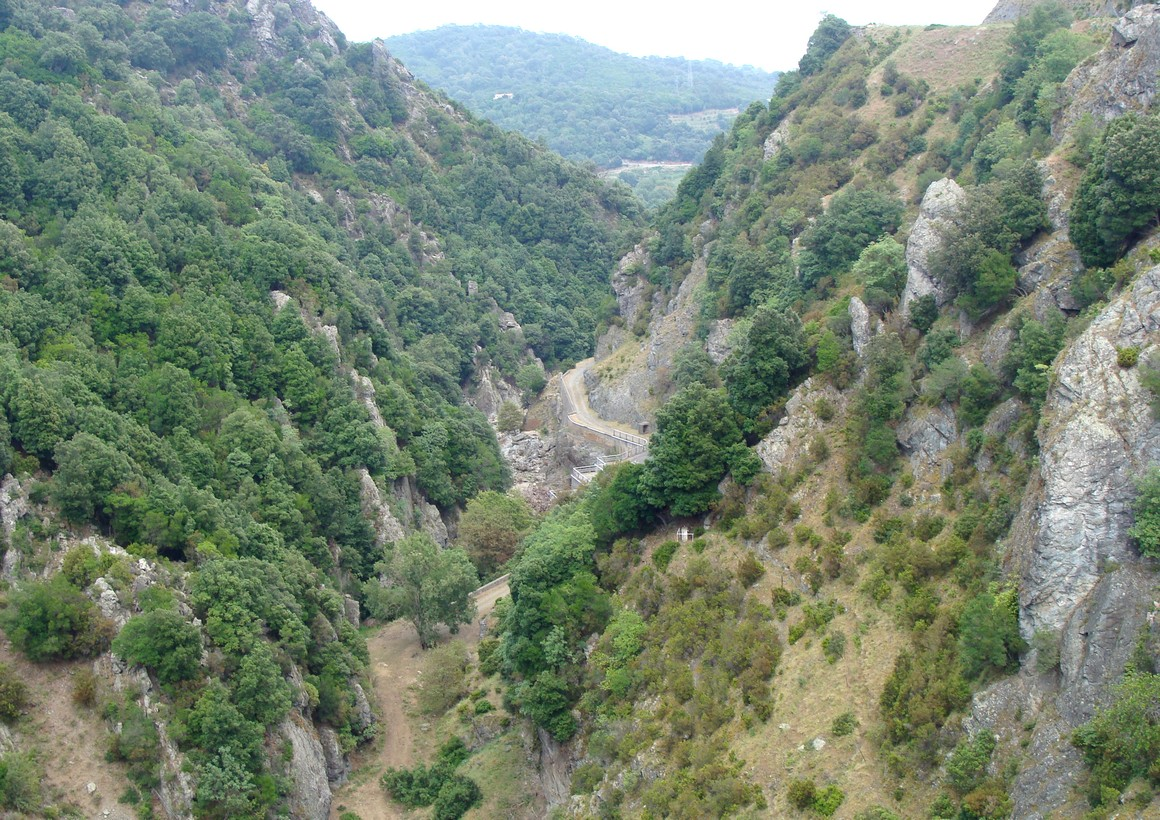
- Alesani valley

- Location within Corsica Location within France
- Native name: Fium'Alesani (Corsican)

Location
- Country: France
- Region: Corse
- Department: Haute-Corse

Physical characteristics
- Mouth: Tyrrhenian Sea
  - coordinates: 42°17′13″N 9°33′29″E
- Length: 24.49 kilometres (15.22 mi)

The Alesani River (French: Rivière d'Alesani, Corsican: Fium'Alesani) is a river in the Haute-Corse department in the island of Corsica, France.

== Location ==
The Alesani River is 24.49 kilometres (15.22 mi) long. It rises to the southeast of the 1,712 metres (5,617 ft) Monte Muffraje. Its source is at an altitude of 1,653 metres (5,423 ft). In the upper part of its course it is called the Busso. The river flows northeast to Piobetta, then southeast to the coast. To the north of Chiatra the river is dammed to form the Réservoir d'Alesani.

== Communes ==
The valley of the Alésani is part of the Castagniccia. The river crosses the communes of Chiatra, Novale, Ortale, Perelli, Piazzali, Pietra-di-Verde, Pietricaggio, Piobetta, Sant'Andréa-di-Cotone, San-Giuliano, Tarrano and Valle-d'Alesani.

== Management ==
The Comité de bassin de Corse was created by the Corsican law of 22 January 2002. It defines the main principles of managing water resources and protecting the natural aquatic environment of Corsica. The Agence de l'eau Rhône-Méditerranée et Corse serves the committee and the Corsican territorial collectivity.

== Tributaries ==
The following streams (Ruisseaux) are tributaries of the Alesani:

- Spiscia (5 km)
  - Filetta (3 km)
    - Panu a l'Acqua (1 km)
    - Sancte Marine (1 km)
  - Mighiarette (1 km)
    - Salge (1 km)
  - Tighiccio (1 km)
- Tulleria (5 km)
  - Aja Vecchia (1 km)
  - Etimone (1 km)
    - Zampinajo (1 km)
  - Pagliaje (1 km)
  - Vignale (1 km)
  - Fornelli (1 km)
- Cipatorno (5 km)
- Rosso (4 km)
  - Teghio (2 km)
  - Fontanelle (1 km)
- Picchio (4 km)
- Lavandaja (3 km)
  - Cemitojo (2 km)
- Suliciani (3 km)
- Valle Botacci (3 km)
  - Vigna (2 km)
- Rione (2 km)
- Piobbo (2 km)
- Castagneto (2 km)
- Brisco (2 km)
- Lavatojo (2 km)
- Solajolo (2 km)
- Pozzolo (2 km)
- Delle Fighe (1 km)
- Tanelle (1 km)
- Nebbio (1 km)
- Calcinajo (1 km)
- Montagnane (1 km)

== Sources ==
- "La vallée d'Alesani", Paradisu (in French)
- Le comité de bassin de Corse (in French), Agence de l'eau Rhône Méditerranée Corse
- "Relation: Rivière d'Alesani (8472954)", OpenStreetMap
- "Rivière d'Alesani", Sandre (in French), Service d'administration nationale des données et référentiels sur l'eau
