= Buccatoggio =

River in France

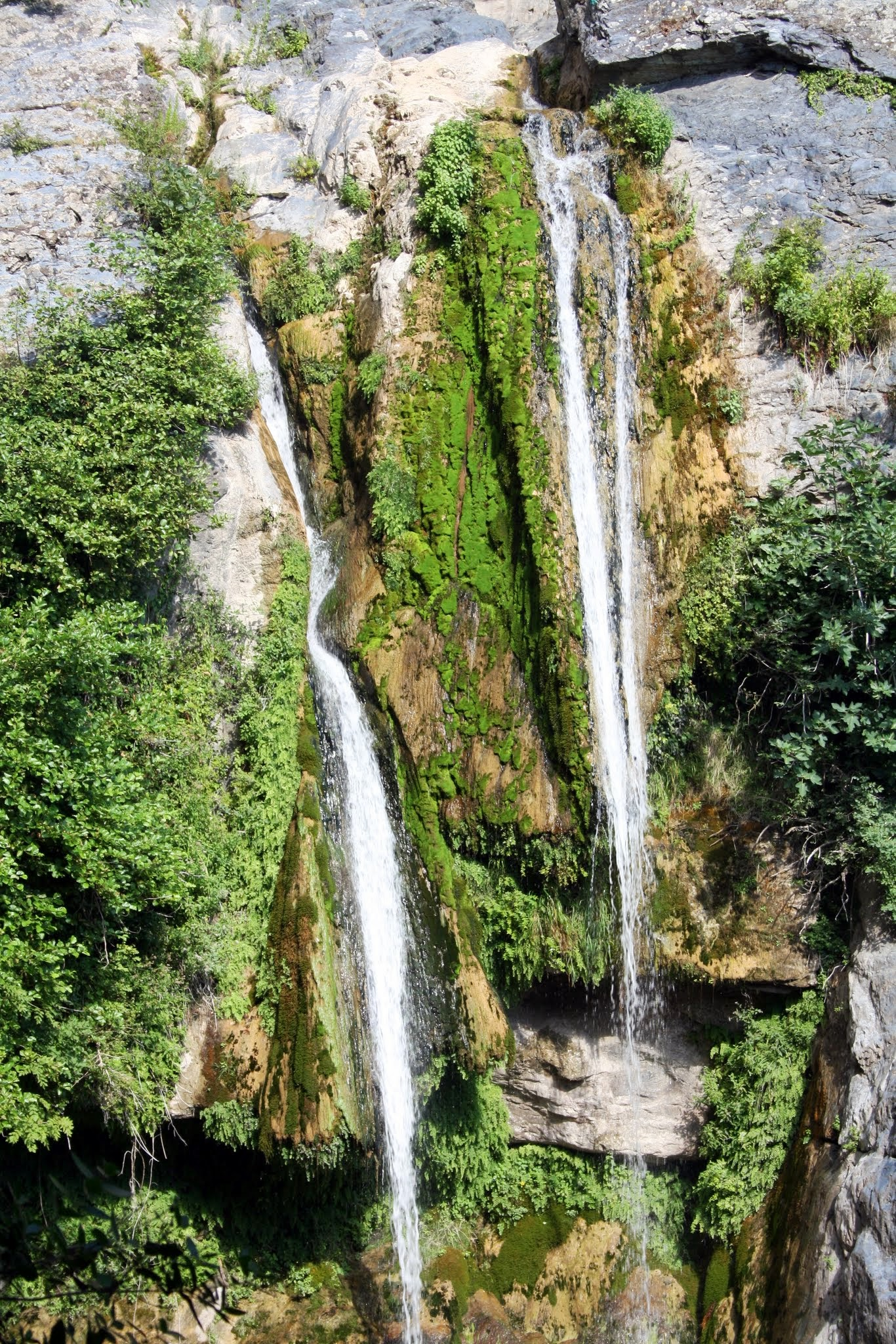
- Cascade de l'Ucelluline above the D330 bridge

- Location within Corsica Location within France

Location
- Country: France
- Region: Corsica
- Department: Haute-Corse

Physical characteristics
- Mouth: Tyrrhenian Sea
  - coordinates: 42.3591°N 9.53449°E

The Buccatoggio, or Bucatoggio (Corsican: Bucatoghju), is a small coastal river in the department of Haute-Corse, Corsica, France. It rises in the Monte San Petrone Massif and flows into the Tyrrhenian Sea on the east of the island.

== Course ==
The Buccatoggio is 9.91 kilometres (6.16 mi) long. It crosses the communes of San-Giovanni-di-Moriani, Santa-Maria-Poggio, San-Nicolao and Santa-Reparata-di-Moriani. It rises in the commune of Santa-Reparata-di-Moriani between the 1,285 metres (4,216 ft) Monte Olmelli and the 1,049 metres (3,442 ft) Croce Di Zuccaro. It flows southeast to the village of Santa-Reparata-di-Moriani, then in a generally east direction to the sea, which it enters to the south of Padulella-Moriani-Plage.

The river contains several large basins that visitors can swim in. The dramatic Ucelluline Waterfall (Cascade de l'Ucelluline) is located beside the "Corniche Road" which runs along the eastern coastal plain.

== Tributaries ==
The following streams (ruisseaux) are tributaries of the Buccatoggio (ordered by length) and sub-tributaries:

- Catarelli 4 km (2.5 mi)
- Minaccio 3 km (1.9 mi)
  - Badionziole 3 km (1.9 mi)
    - La Piada 1 km (0.62 mi)
    - Casamora 1 km (0.62 mi)
  - Tasso 2 km (1.2 mi)
  - Emerini 1 km (0.62 mi)
  - Piova 1 km (0.62 mi)
- Erbajolo 2 km (1.2 mi)
- Trappola 2 km (1.2 mi)
- Valitoti 1 km (0.62 mi)
- Mortete 1 km (0.62 mi)
- Casoli 1 km (0.62 mi)
- Trefontane 1 km (0.62 mi)

== Sources ==
- "Bucatoggio", Paradisu (in French)
- "Cascade de l'Ucelluline", Paradisu (in French)
- "Relation: Rivière de Bucatoggio (8718957)", OpenStreetMap
- "Rivière de Bucatoggio", Sandre (in French)
