= Moriani =

Moriani is an Italian surname.Notable persons with that name include:

- Giuseppe Moriani (17th–18th century), Italian painter
- Napoleone Moriani (1808–1878), Italian opera singer

== See also ==
- San-Giovanni-di-Moriani, a commune on the island of Corsica
- Santa-Reparata-di-Moriani, a commune on the island of Corsica
