= Silvareccio =

Silvareccio U Silvarecciu
- Commune
- Location of Silvareccio
- Location within France Location within Corsica
- Coordinates: 42°27′05″N 9°24′36″E
- Country: France
- Region: Corsica
- Department: Haute-Corse
- Arrondissement: Corte
- Canton: Casinca-Fumalto

Government
  - Mayor (2020–2026): Ange Straforelli
- Area^{1}: 4.82 km^{2} (1.86 sq mi)
- Elevation: 640 m (2,100 ft)
- Highest elevation: 1,218 m (3,996 ft)
- Lowest elevation: 394 m (1,293 ft)
- Population (2023): 99
  - Density: 21/km^{2} (53/sq mi)
- Time zone: UTC+01:00 (CET)
  - Summer (DST): UTC+02:00 (CEST)
- INSEE/Postal code: 2B280 /20215
- ^{1} French Land Register data, which excludes lakes, ponds, glaciers > 1 km^{2} (0.386 sq mi or 247 acres) and river estuaries.

Silvareccio is a commune in the Haute-Corse department of France on the island of Corsica.

== Population ==
Historical population
Year	Pop.	±% p.a.
1968	173	—
1975	98	−7.80%
1982	73	−4.12%
1990	77	+0.67%
1999	97	+2.60%
2007	119	+2.59%
2012	119	+0.00%
2017	131	+1.94%
2023	99	−4.56%
Source: INSEE

== See also ==
- Communes of the Haute-Corse department
