= Piedicroce =

- Commune
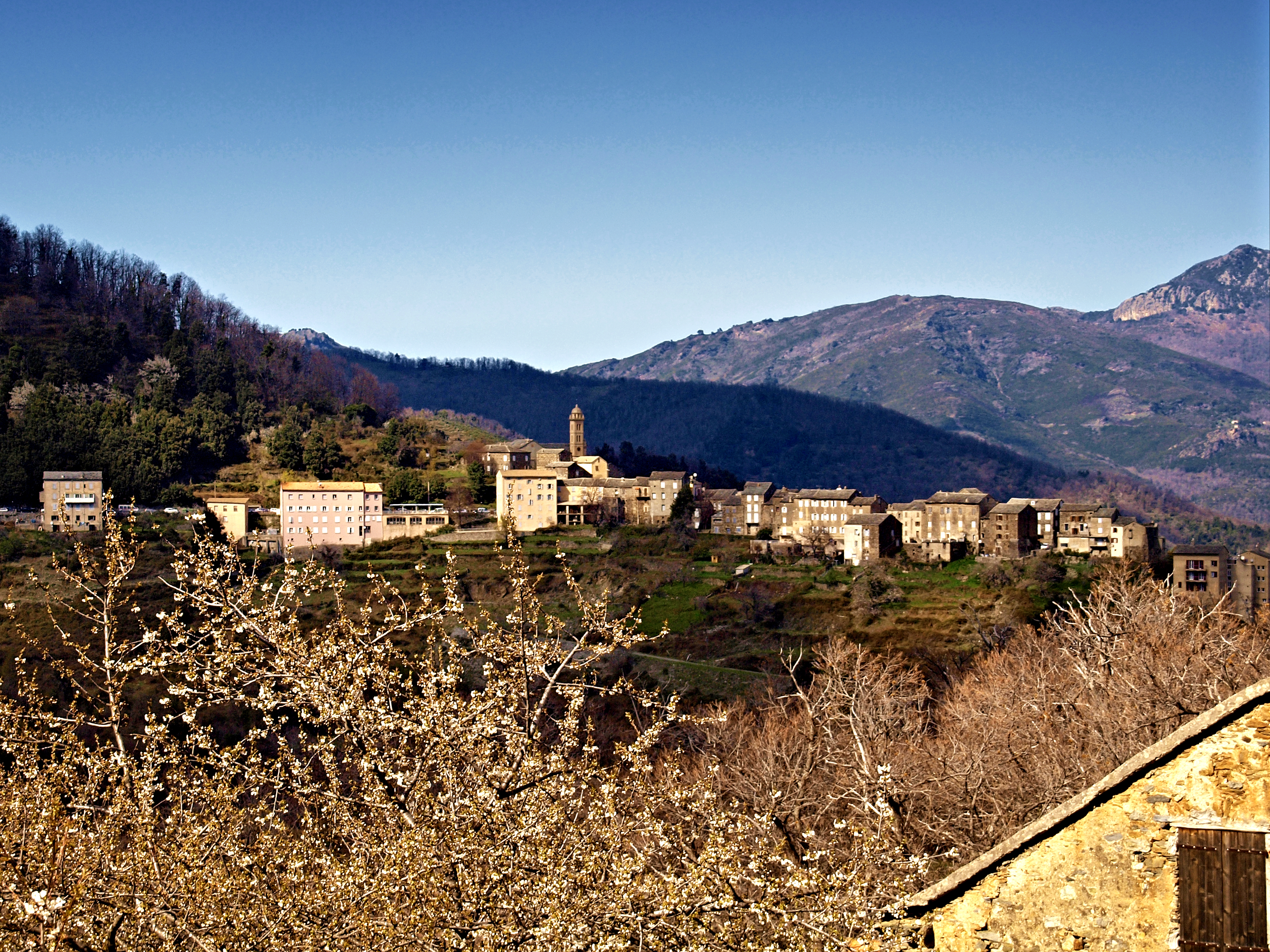
- A general view of Piedicroce
- Location of Piedicroce
- Location within France Location within Corsica
- Coordinates: 42°22′30″N 9°22′05″E
- Country: France
- Region: Corsica
- Department: Haute-Corse
- Arrondissement: Corte
- Canton: Castagniccia

Government
  - Mayor (2020–2026): Pierre-Ange Sency
- Area^{1}: 3.27 km^{2} (1.26 sq mi)
- Elevation: 636 m (2,087 ft)
- Highest elevation: 847 m (2,779 ft)
- Lowest elevation: 292 m (958 ft)
- Population (2023): 81
  - Density: 25/km^{2} (64/sq mi)
- Time zone: UTC+01:00 (CET)
  - Summer (DST): UTC+02:00 (CEST)
- INSEE/Postal code: 2B219 /20229
- ^{1} French Land Register data, which excludes lakes, ponds, glaciers > 1 km^{2} (0.386 sq mi or 247 acres) and river estuaries.

Piedicroce is a commune in the Haute-Corse department of France on the island of Corsica.

== Population ==
Historical population
Year	Pop.	±% p.a.
1968	212	—
1975	172	−2.94%
1982	164	−0.68%
1990	91	−7.10%
1999	117	+2.83%
2007	123	+0.63%
2012	127	+0.64%
2017	100	−4.67%
2023	81	−3.45%
Source: INSEE

== See also ==
- Communes of the Haute-Corse department
