= Giocatojo =

- Commune
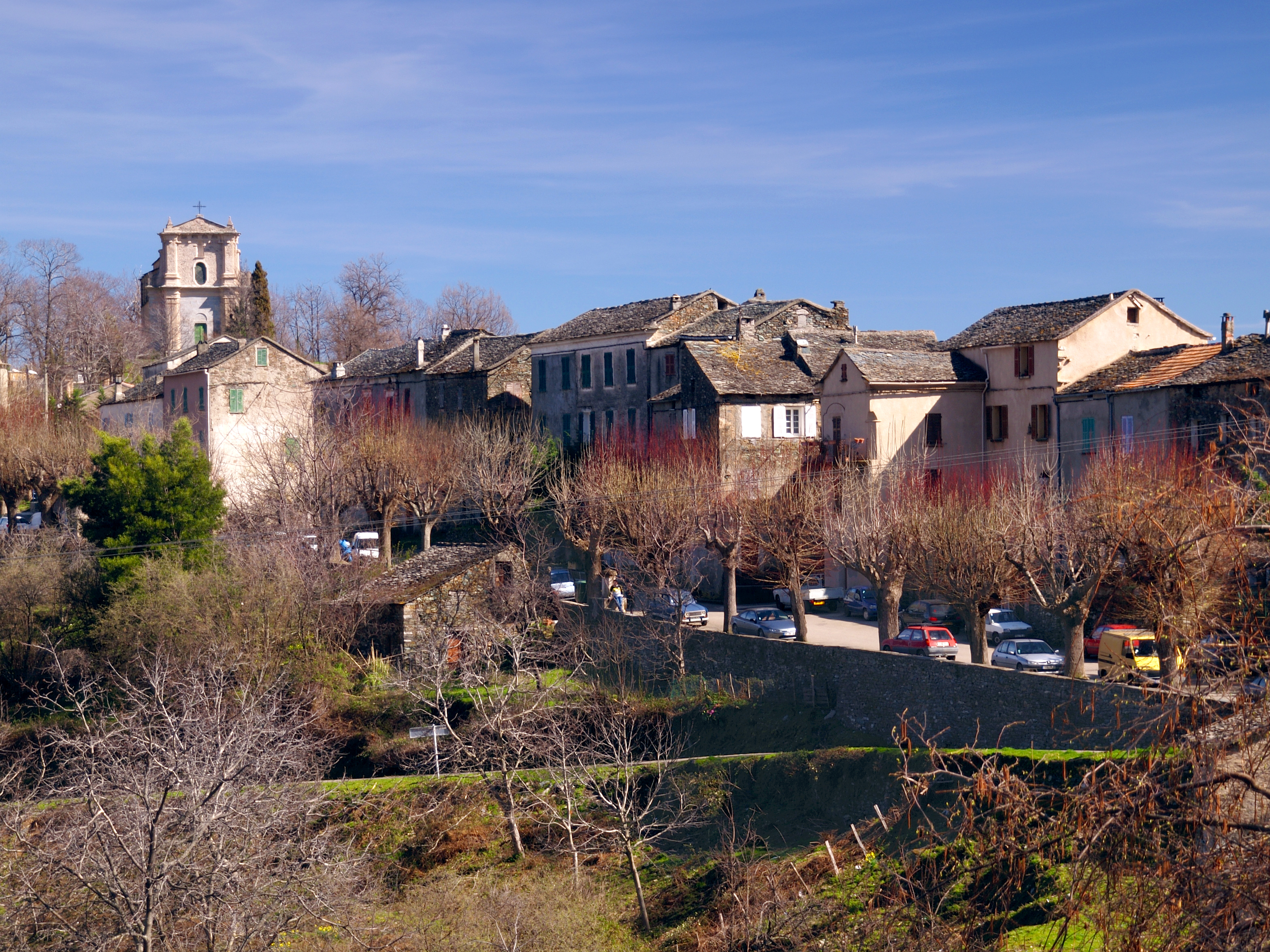
- The village of Giocatojo
- Location of Giocatojo
- Location within France Location within Corsica
- Coordinates: 42°26′39″N 9°21′02″E
- Country: France
- Region: Corsica
- Department: Haute-Corse
- Arrondissement: Corte
- Canton: Casinca-Fumalto

Government
  - Mayor (2020–2026): Grégory Biaggi
- Area^{1}: 2.47 km^{2} (0.95 sq mi)
- Elevation: 550 m (1,800 ft)
- Highest elevation: 1,231 m (4,039 ft)
- Lowest elevation: 464 m (1,522 ft)
- Population (2023): 46
  - Density: 19/km^{2} (48/sq mi)
- Time zone: UTC+01:00 (CET)
  - Summer (DST): UTC+02:00 (CEST)
- INSEE/Postal code: 2B125 /20237
- ^{1} French Land Register data, which excludes lakes, ponds, glaciers > 1 km^{2} (0.386 sq mi or 247 acres) and river estuaries.

Giocatojo is a commune in the Haute-Corse department of France on the island of Corsica.

== Population ==
Historical population
Year	Pop.	±% p.a.
1968	69	—
1975	47	−5.34%
1982	41	−1.93%
1990	32	−3.05%
1999	49	+4.85%
2007	47	−0.52%
2012	45	−0.87%
2017	49	+1.72%
2023	46	−1.05%
Source: INSEE

== See also ==
- Communes of the Haute-Corse department
