= Arrondissement of Corte =

Coordinates: 42.3064°N 9.1514°E

Corte
- Arrondissement
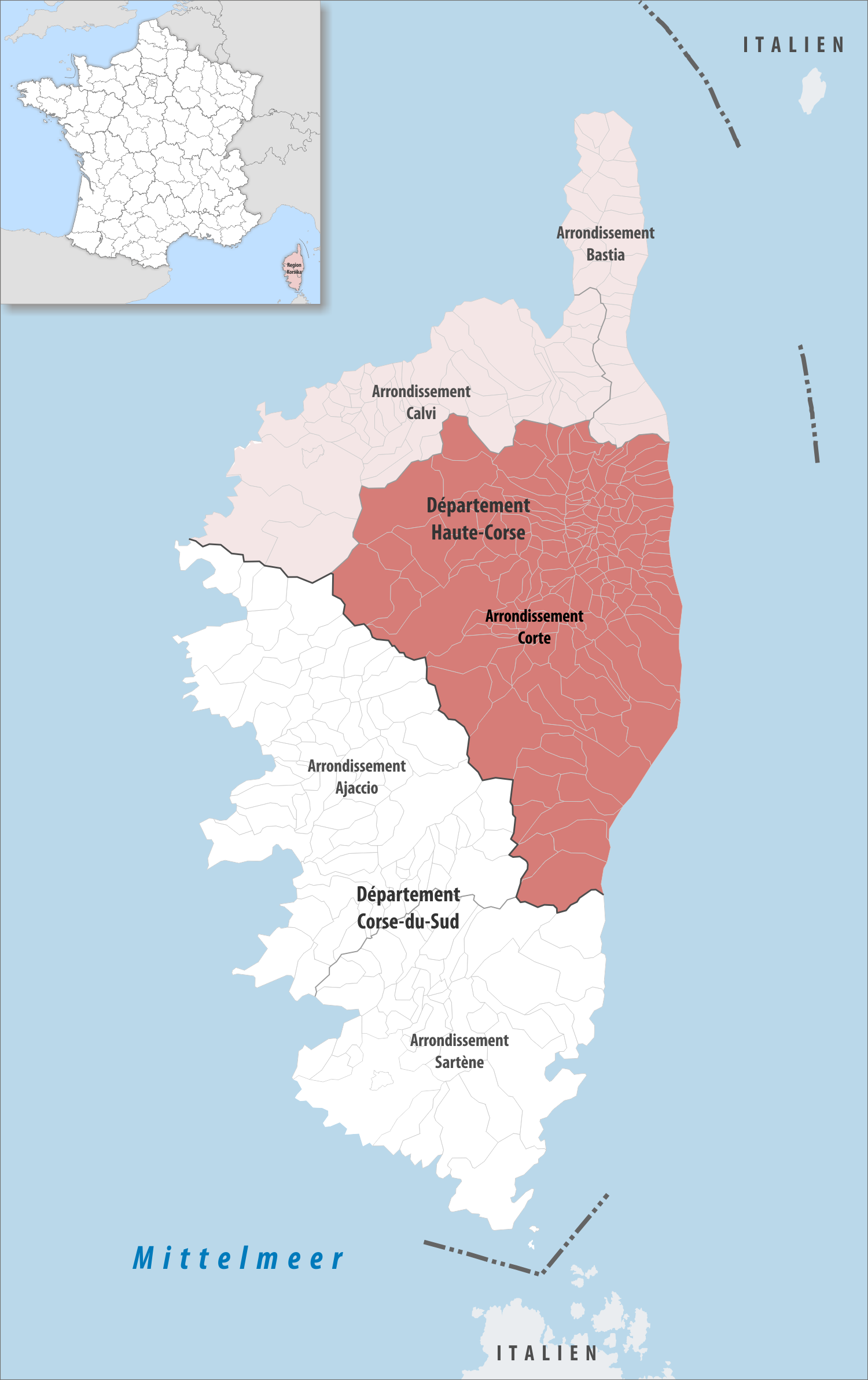
- Location within the region Corsica
- Country: France
- Region: Corsica
- Department: Haute-Corse
- No. of communes: {{{nbcomm}}}
- Area: 2,853.4 km^{2} (1,101.7 sq mi)
- Population (2023): 61,924
  - Density: 21.702/km^{2} (56.207/sq mi)
- INSEE code: 2B3

The arrondissement of Corte (French: arrondissement de Corte; Corsican: circundariu di Corti) is an arrondissement of France in the Haute-Corse department in the territorial collectivity of Corsica. It has 158 communes. Its population is 60,236 (2021), and its area is 2,853.4 km^{2} (1,101.7 sq mi).

== Composition ==
The communes of the arrondissement of Corte, and their INSEE codes, are:

1. Aghione (2B002)
2. Aiti (2B003)
3. Alando (2B005)
4. Albertacce (2B007)
5. Aléria (2B009)
6. Altiani (2B012)
7. Alzi (2B013)
8. Ampriani (2B015)
9. Antisanti (2B016)
10. Asco (2B023)
11. Bigorno (2B036)
12. Bisinchi (2B039)
13. Bustanico (2B045)
14. Calacuccia (2B047)
15. Cambia (2B051)
16. Campana (2B052)
17. Campi (2B053)
18. Campile (2B054)
19. Campitello (2B055)
20. Canale-di-Verde (2B057)
21. Canavaggia (2B059)
22. Carcheto-Brustico (2B063)
23. Carpineto (2B067)
24. Carticasi (2B068)
25. Casabianca (2B069)
26. Casalta (2B072)
27. Casamaccioli (2B073)
28. Casanova (2B074)
29. Casevecchie (2B075)
30. Castellare-di-Casinca (2B077)
31. Castellare-di-Mercurio (2B078)
32. Castello-di-Rostino (2B079)
33. Castifao (2B080)
34. Castiglione (2B081)
35. Castineta (2B082)
36. Castirla (2B083)
37. Cervione (2B087)
38. Chiatra (2B088)
39. Chisa (2B366)
40. Corscia (2B095)
41. Corte (2B096)
42. Croce (2B101)
43. Crocicchia (2B102)
44. Erbajolo (2B105)
45. Érone (2B106)
46. Favalello (2B110)
47. Felce (2B111)
48. Ficaja (2B113)
49. Focicchia (2B116)
50. Gavignano (2B122)
51. Ghisonaccia (2B123)
52. Ghisoni (2B124)
53. Giocatojo (2B125)
54. Giuncaggio (2B126)
55. Isolaccio-di-Fiumorbo (2B135)
56. La Porta (2B246)
57. Lano (2B137)
58. Lento (2B140)
59. Linguizzetta (2B143)
60. Loreto-di-Casinca (2B145)
61. Lozzi (2B147)
62. Lugo-di-Nazza (2B149)
63. Matra (2B155)
64. Mazzola (2B157)
65. Moïta (2B161)
66. Moltifao (2B162)
67. Monacia-d'Orezza (2B164)
68. Monte (2B166)
69. Morosaglia (2B169)
70. Muracciole (2B171)
71. Nocario (2B176)
72. Noceta (2B177)
73. Novale (2B179)
74. Olmo (2B192)
75. Omessa (2B193)
76. Ortale (2B194)
77. Ortiporio (2B195)
78. Pancheraccia (2B201)
79. Parata (2B202)
80. Penta-Acquatella (2B206)
81. Penta-di-Casinca (2B207)
82. Perelli (2B208)
83. Pero-Casevecchie (2B210)
84. Pianello (2B213)
85. Piano (2B214)
86. Piazzali (2B216)
87. Piazzole (2B217)
88. Piedicorte-di-Gaggio (2B218)
89. Piedicroce (2B219)
90. Piedigriggio (2B220)
91. Piedipartino (2B221)
92. Pie-d'Orezza (2B222)
93. Pietra-di-Verde (2B225)
94. Pietraserena (2B226)
95. Pietricaggio (2B227)
96. Pietroso (2B229)
97. Piobetta (2B234)
98. Poggio-di-Nazza (2B236)
99. Poggio-di-Venaco (2B238)
100. Poggio-Marinaccio (2B241)
101. Poggio-Mezzana (2B242)
102. Polveroso (2B243)
103. Popolasca (2B244)
104. Porri (2B245)
105. Prato-di-Giovellina (2B248)
106. Prunelli-di-Casacconi (2B250)
107. Prunelli-di-Fiumorbo (2B251)
108. Pruno (2B252)
109. Quercitello (2B255)
110. Rapaggio (2B256)
111. Riventosa (2B260)
112. Rospigliani (2B263)
113. Rusio (2B264)
114. Saliceto (2B267)
115. San-Damiano (2B297)
116. San-Gavino-d'Ampugnani (2B299)
117. San-Gavino-di-Fiumorbo (2B365)
118. San-Giovanni-di-Moriani (2B302)
119. San-Giuliano (2B303)
120. San-Lorenzo (2B304)
121. San-Nicolao (2B313)
122. Santa-Lucia-di-Mercurio (2B306)
123. Santa-Lucia-di-Moriani (2B307)
124. Santa-Maria-Poggio (2B311)
125. Sant'Andréa-di-Bozio (2B292)
126. Sant'Andréa-di-Cotone (2B293)
127. Santa-Reparata-di-Moriani (2B317)
128. Santo-Pietro-di-Venaco (2B315)
129. Scata (2B273)
130. Scolca (2B274)
131. Sermano (2B275)
132. Serra-di-Fiumorbo (2B277)
133. Silvareccio (2B280)
134. Solaro (2B283)
135. Sorbo-Ocagnano (2B286)
136. Soveria (2B289)
137. Stazzona (2B291)
138. Taglio-Isolaccio (2B318)
139. Talasani (2B319)
140. Tallone (2B320)
141. Tarrano (2B321)
142. Tox (2B328)
143. Tralonca (2B329)
144. Valle-d'Alesani (2B334)
145. Valle-di-Campoloro (2B335)
146. Valle-di-Rostino (2B337)
147. Valle-d'Orezza (2B338)
148. Velone-Orneto (2B340)
149. Venaco (2B341)
150. Ventiseri (2B342)
151. Venzolasca (2B343)
152. Verdèse (2B344)
153. Vescovato (2B346)
154. Vezzani (2B347)
155. Vivario (2B354)
156. Volpajola (2B355)
157. Zalana (2B356)
158. Zuani (2B364)

== History ==
The arrondissement of Corte was created as part of the department Golo in 1800. Between 1811 and 1976 it was an arrondissement of the department Corse, since 1976 it has been an arrondissement of the department Haute-Corse. On 1 January 2010, it gained the four cantons of Alto-di-Casaconi, Fiumalto-d'Ampugnani, Campoloro-di-Moriani and Vescovato from the arrondissement of Bastia.

As a result of the reorganisation of the cantons of France which came into effect in 2015, the borders of the cantons are no longer related to the borders of the arrondissements. The cantons of the arrondissement of Corte were, as of January 2015:

1. Alto-di-Casaconi
2. Bustanico
3. Campoloro-di-Moriani
4. Castifao-Morosaglia
5. Corte
6. Fiumalto-d'Ampugnani
7. Ghisoni
8. Moïta-Verde
9. Niolu-Omessa
10. Orezza-Alesani
11. Prunelli-di-Fiumorbo
12. Venaco
13. Vescovato
14. Vezzani
