= Piedipartino =

- Commune
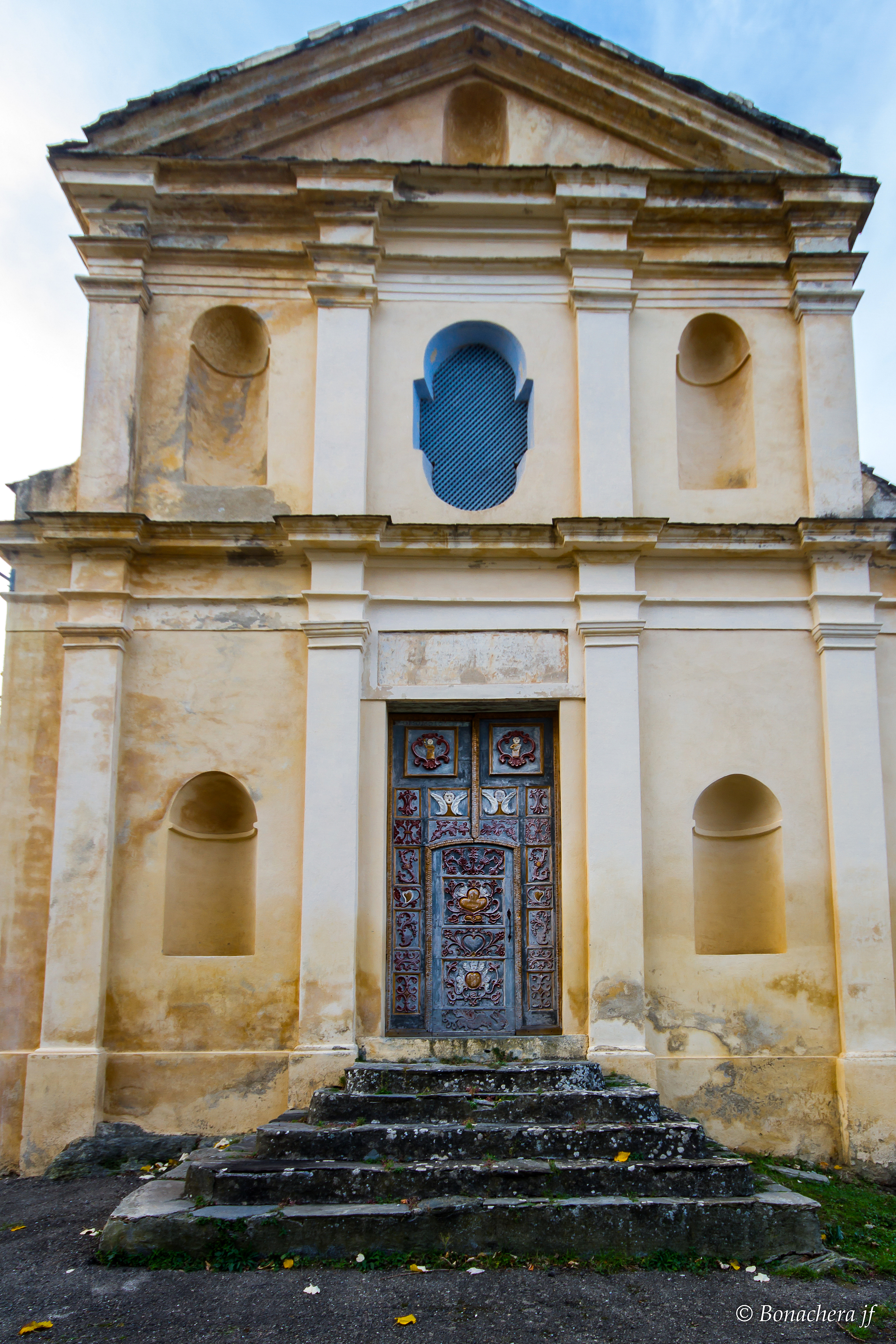
- The church in Piedipartino
- Location of Piedipartino
- Location within France Location within Corsica
- Coordinates: 42°22′09″N 9°21′33″E
- Country: France
- Region: Corsica
- Department: Haute-Corse
- Arrondissement: Corte
- Canton: Castagniccia

Government
  - Mayor (2024–2026): Nicolas Mazzoni
- Area^{1}: 3.25 km^{2} (1.25 sq mi)
- Elevation: 636 m (2,087 ft)
- Highest elevation: 1,697 m (5,568 ft)
- Lowest elevation: 517 m (1,696 ft)
- Population (2023): 19
  - Density: 5.8/km^{2} (15/sq mi)
- Time zone: UTC+01:00 (CET)
  - Summer (DST): UTC+02:00 (CEST)
- INSEE/Postal code: 2B221 /20229
- ^{1} French Land Register data, which excludes lakes, ponds, glaciers > 1 km^{2} (0.386 sq mi or 247 acres) and river estuaries.

Piedipartino is a commune in the Haute-Corse department of France.

== Population ==
Historical population
Year	Pop.	±% p.a.
1968	36	—
1975	27	−4.03%
1982	9	−14.52%
1990	12	+3.66%
1999	19	+5.24%
2007	17	−1.38%
2012	17	+0.00%
2017	17	+0.00%
2023	19	+1.87%
Source: INSEE

== See also ==
- Communes of the Haute-Corse department
