= Felce =

- Commune
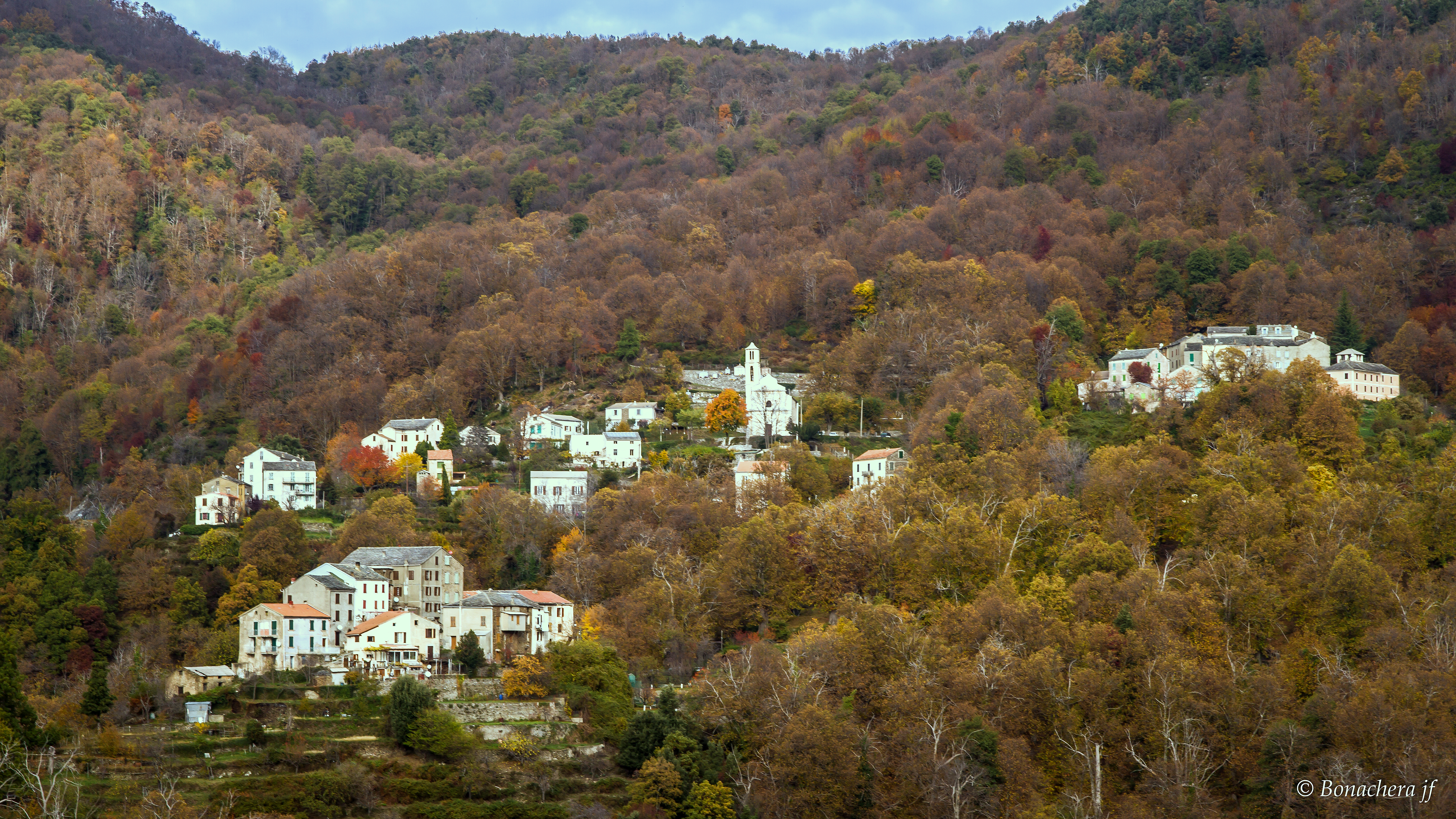
- The hamlet of Volgheracciu, in Felce
- Location of Felce
- Location within France Location within Corsica
- Coordinates: 42°21′00″N 9°25′03″E
- Country: France
- Region: Corsica
- Department: Haute-Corse
- Arrondissement: Corte
- Canton: Castagniccia

Government
  - Mayor (2020–2026): Lucien Panier
- Area^{1}: 4.67 km^{2} (1.80 sq mi)
- Elevation: 800 m (2,600 ft)
- Highest elevation: 1,252 m (4,108 ft)
- Lowest elevation: 557 m (1,827 ft)
- Population (2023): 54
  - Density: 12/km^{2} (30/sq mi)
- Time zone: UTC+01:00 (CET)
  - Summer (DST): UTC+02:00 (CEST)
- INSEE/Postal code: 2B111 /20234
- ^{1} French Land Register data, which excludes lakes, ponds, glaciers > 1 km^{2} (0.386 sq mi or 247 acres) and river estuaries.

Felce is a commune in the Haute-Corse department of France on the island of Corsica.

== Population ==
Historical population
Year	Pop.	±% p.a.
1968	81	—
1975	75	−1.09%
1982	72	−0.58%
1990	33	−9.29%
1999	43	+2.98%
2007	49	+1.65%
2012	52	+1.20%
2017	51	−0.39%
2023	54	+0.96%
Source: INSEE

== See also ==
- Communes of the Haute-Corse department
