= Pie-d'Orezza =

Pied'Orezza U Pedorezza
- Commune
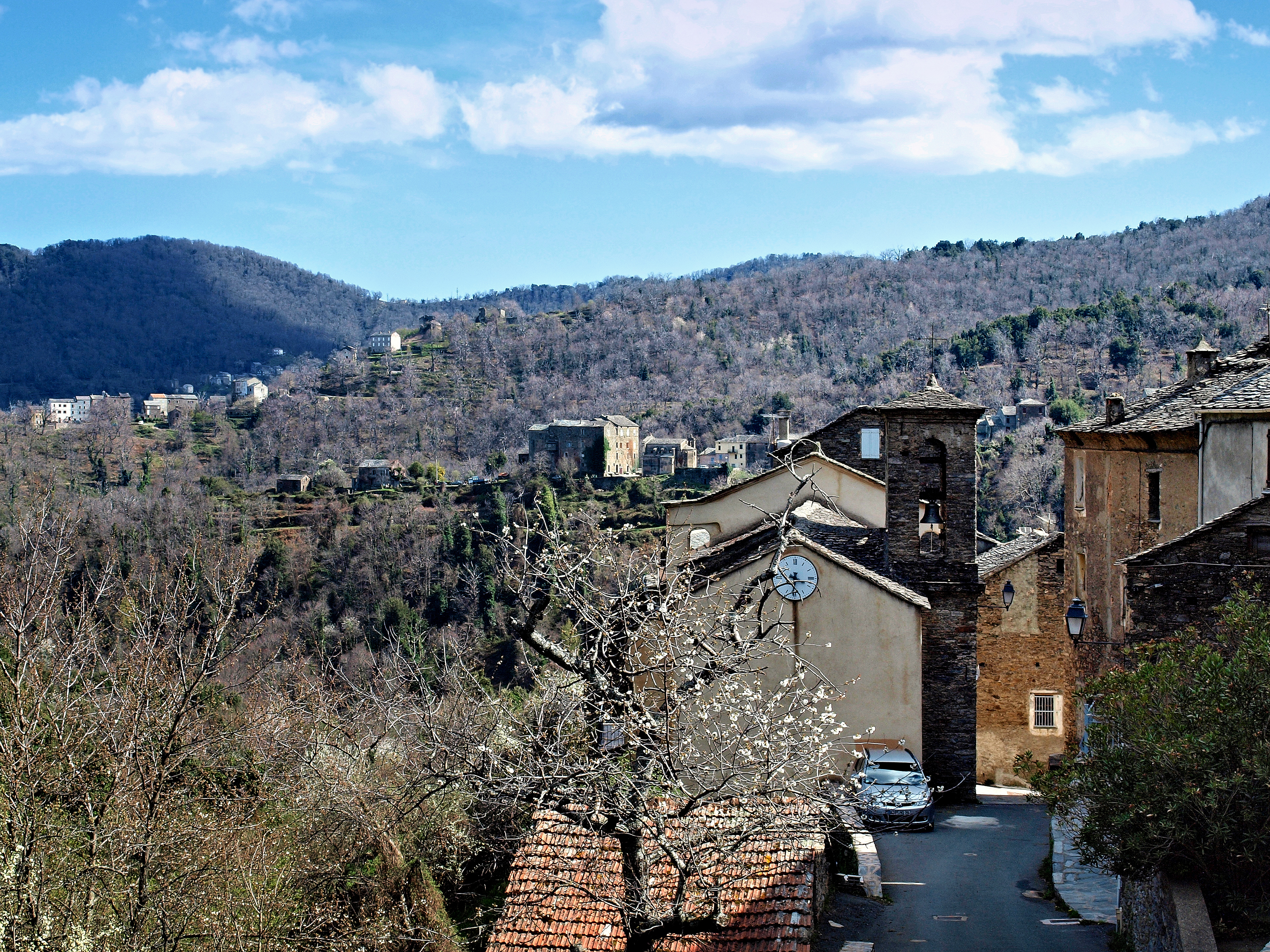
- A view within Pie-d'Orezza village
- Location of Pied'Orezza
- Location within France Location within Corsica
- Coordinates: 42°22′22″N 9°21′20″E
- Country: France
- Region: Corsica
- Department: Haute-Corse
- Arrondissement: Corte
- Canton: Castagniccia

Government
  - Mayor (2020–2026): Toussaint Filippini
- Area^{1}: 5.79 km^{2} (2.24 sq mi)
- Elevation: 633 m (2,077 ft)
- Highest elevation: 1,766 m (5,794 ft)
- Lowest elevation: 541 m (1,775 ft)
- Population (2023): 35
  - Density: 6.0/km^{2} (16/sq mi)
- Time zone: UTC+01:00 (CET)
  - Summer (DST): UTC+02:00 (CEST)
- INSEE/Postal code: 2B222 /20229
- ^{1} French Land Register data, which excludes lakes, ponds, glaciers > 1 km^{2} (0.386 sq mi or 247 acres) and river estuaries.

Pie-d'Orezza is a commune in the Haute-Corse department of France on the island of Corsica.

== Population ==
Historical population
Year	Pop.	±% p.a.
1968	58	—
1975	55	−0.76%
1982	43	−3.46%
1990	39	−1.21%
1999	25	−4.82%
2007	34	+3.92%
2012	36	+1.15%
2017	37	+0.55%
2023	35	−0.92%
Source: INSEE

== See also ==
- Communes of the Haute-Corse department
