= Rapaggio =

- Commune
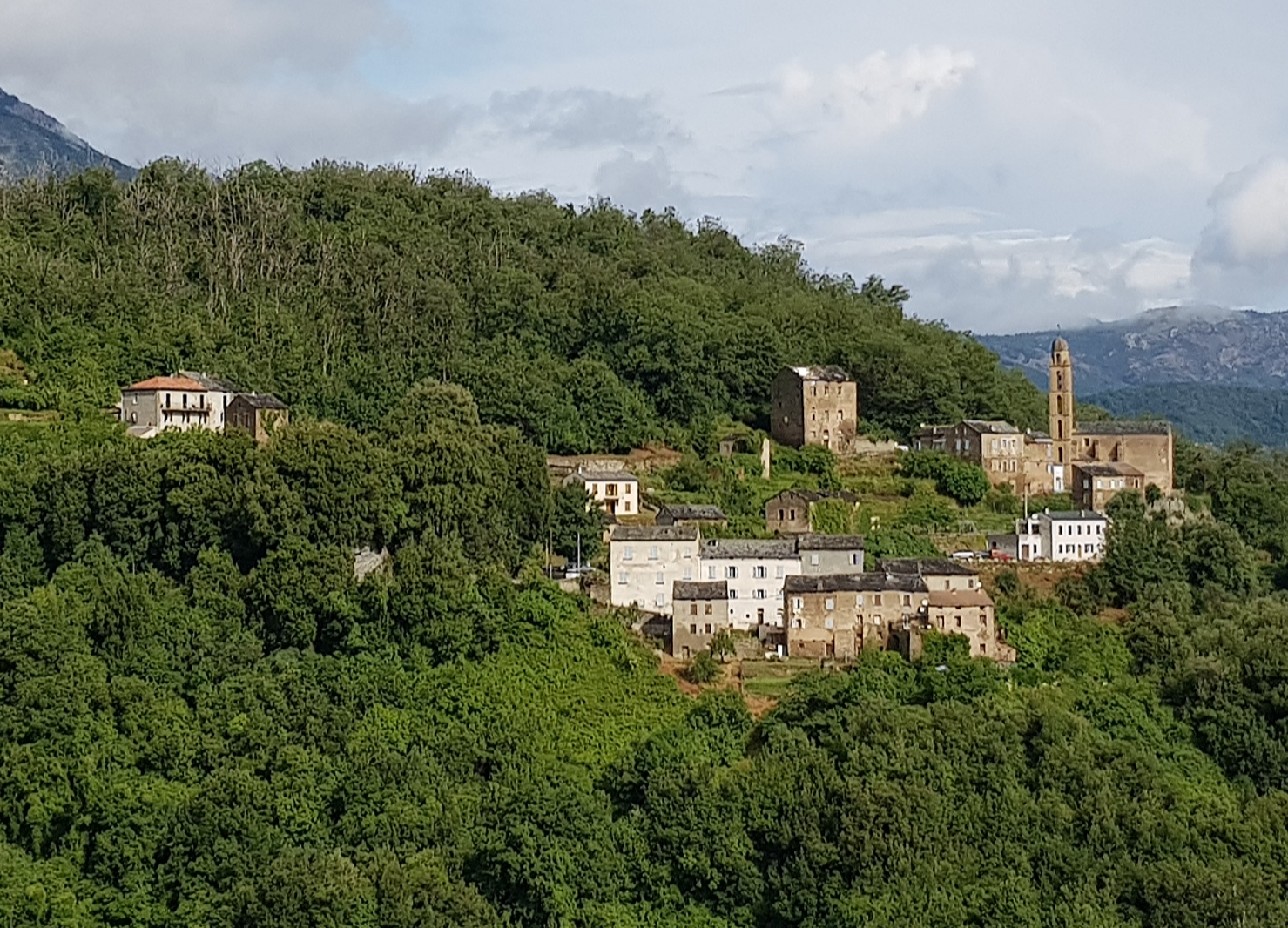
- Location of Rapaggio
- Location within France Location within Corsica
- Coordinates: 42°22′24″N 9°23′26″E
- Country: France
- Region: Corsica
- Department: Haute-Corse
- Arrondissement: Corte
- Canton: Castagniccia

Government
  - Mayor (2020–2026): Stella Pieri
- Area^{1}: 2.56 km^{2} (0.99 sq mi)
- Elevation: 630 m (2,070 ft)
- Highest elevation: 768 m (2,520 ft)
- Lowest elevation: 318 m (1,043 ft)
- Population (2023): 32
  - Density: 13/km^{2} (32/sq mi)
- Time zone: UTC+01:00 (CET)
  - Summer (DST): UTC+02:00 (CEST)
- INSEE/Postal code: 2B256 /20229
- ^{1} French Land Register data, which excludes lakes, ponds, glaciers > 1 km^{2} (0.386 sq mi or 247 acres) and river estuaries.

Rapaggio is a commune in the Haute-Corse department of France on the island of Corsica.

== Population ==
Historical population
Year	Pop.	±% p.a.
1968	40	—
1975	27	−5.46%
1982	31	+1.99%
1990	14	−9.46%
1999	10	−3.67%
2007	18	+7.62%
2012	21	+3.13%
2017	25	+3.55%
2023	32	+4.20%
Source: INSEE

== See also ==
- Communes of the Haute-Corse department
