= Monacia-d'Orezza =

- Commune
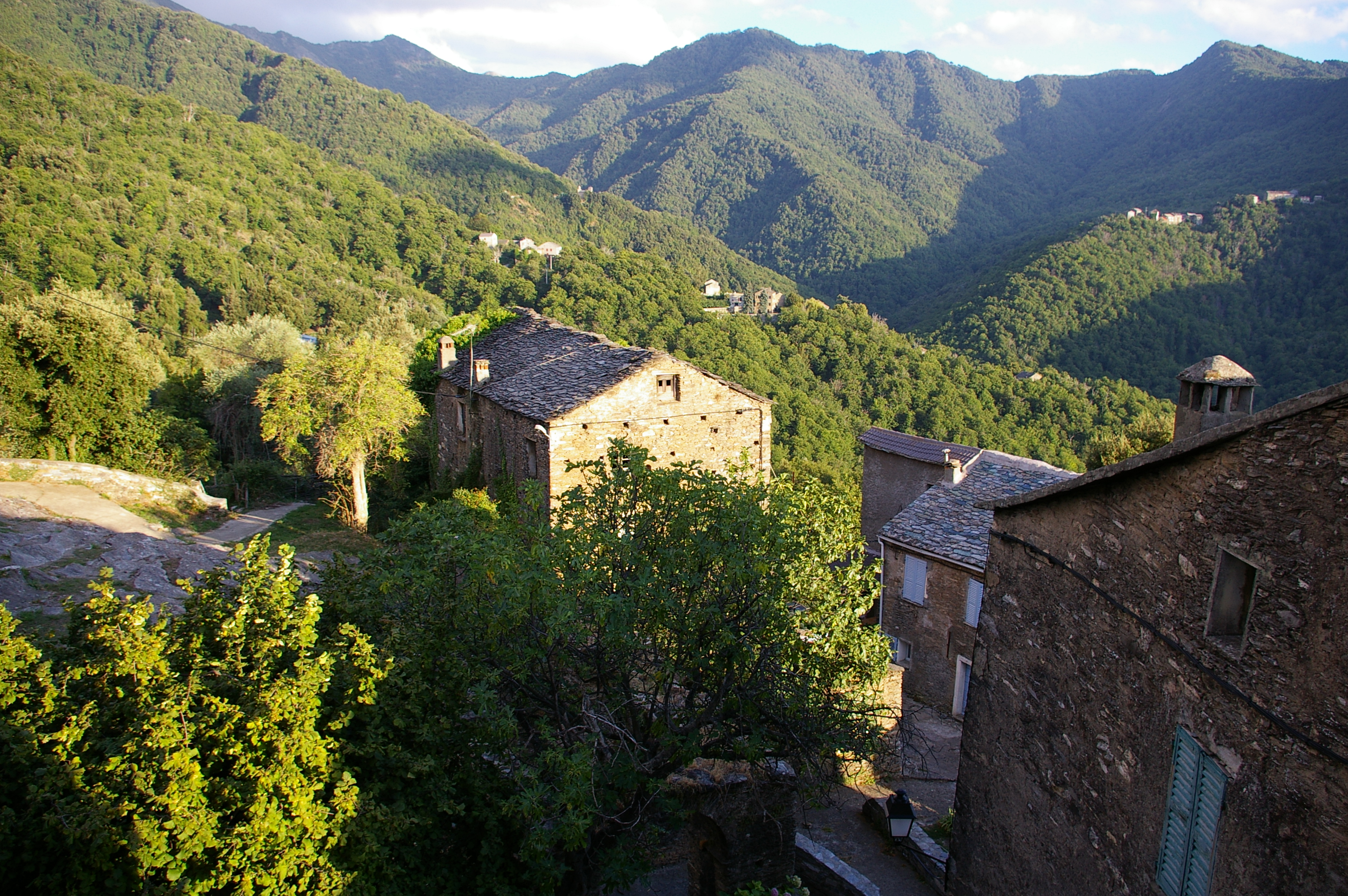
- A view within the village of Monacia-d'Orezza
- Location of Monacia-d'Orezza
- Location within France Location within Corsica
- Coordinates: 42°22′58″N 9°23′56″E
- Country: France
- Region: Corsica
- Department: Haute-Corse
- Arrondissement: Corte
- Canton: Castagniccia

Government
  - Mayor (2020–2026): Pascal Fantini
- Area^{1}: 4.52 km^{2} (1.75 sq mi)
- Elevation: 590 m (1,940 ft)
- Highest elevation: 1,200 m (3,900 ft)
- Lowest elevation: 307 m (1,007 ft)
- Population (2023): 25
  - Density: 5.5/km^{2} (14/sq mi)
- Time zone: UTC+01:00 (CET)
  - Summer (DST): UTC+02:00 (CEST)
- INSEE/Postal code: 2B164 /20229
- ^{1} French Land Register data, which excludes lakes, ponds, glaciers > 1 km^{2} (0.386 sq mi or 247 acres) and river estuaries.

Monacia-d'Orezza (French pronunciation: [mɔnasja.d‿ɔʁɛza]) is a commune in the Haute-Corse department of France on the island of Corsica.

== Population ==
Historical population
Year	Pop.	±% p.a.
1968	65	—
1975	50	−3.68%
1982	48	−0.58%
1990	22	−9.29%
1999	30	+3.51%
2007	32	+0.81%
2012	32	+0.00%
2017	25	−4.82%
2023	25	+0.00%
Source: INSEE

== See also ==
- Communes of the Haute-Corse department
