= Canton of Castagniccia =

Coordinates: 42.37°N 9.50°E

The Canton of Castagniccia (French: canton de la Castagniccia, [kɑ̃tɔ̃ də la kastaɲitʃ(j)a]) is a canton of the Haute-Corse department, Corsica, France, named after the natural region of Castagniccia (Corsican pronunciation: [kaˈstaɲɲitˈtʃa]). It was created at the French canton reorganisation which came into effect in March 2015. Its seat is in San-Nicolao.

It consists of the following communes:

1. Campana
2. Canale-di-Verde
3. Carcheto-Brustico
4. Carpineto
5. Cervione
6. Chiatra
7. Felce
8. Monacia-d'Orezza
9. Nocario
10. Novale
11. Ortale
12. Parata
13. Perelli
14. Piazzali
15. Piazzole
16. Piedicroce
17. Piedipartino
18. Pie-d'Orezza
19. Pietra-di-Verde
20. Pietricaggio
21. Piobetta
22. Poggio-Mezzana
23. Rapaggio
24. San-Giovanni-di-Moriani
25. San-Giuliano
26. San-Nicolao
27. Santa-Lucia-di-Moriani
28. Santa-Maria-Poggio
29. Sant'Andréa-di-Cotone
30. Santa-Reparata-di-Moriani
31. Stazzona
32. Tarrano
33. Valle-d'Alesani
34. Valle-di-Campoloro
35. Valle-d'Orezza
36. Velone-Orneto
37. Verdèse
