= Communes of the Haute-Corse department =

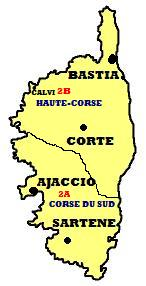

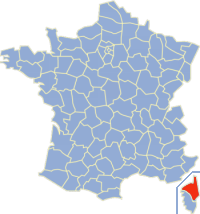

The following is a list of the 236 communes of the Haute-Corse department of France.

The communes cooperate in the following intercommunalities (as of 2025):

- Communauté d'agglomération de Bastia
- Communauté de communes de Calvi Balagne
- Communauté de communes du Cap Corse
- Communauté de communes de la Castagniccia-Casinca
- Communauté de communes du Centre Corse
- Communauté de communes de la Costa Verde
- Communauté de communes de Fium'Orbu Castellu
- Communauté de communes de l'Île-Rousse - Balagne
- Communauté de communes de Marana-Golo
- Communauté de communes Nebbiu - Conca d'Oro
- Communauté de communes de l'Oriente
- Communauté de communes Pasquale Paoli

INSEE code	Postal code	Commune
2B002	20270	Aghione
2B003	20244	Aiti
2B005	20212	Alando
2B007	20224	Albertacce
2B009	20270	Aléria
2B010	20220	Algajola
2B012	20251	Altiani
2B013	20212	Alzi
2B015	20272	Ampriani
2B016	20270	Antisanti
2B020	20220	Aregno
2B023	20276	Asco
2B025	20225	Avapessa
2B029	20253	Barbaggio
2B030	20228	Barrettali
2B033	20200	Bastia
2B034	20226	Belgodère
2B036	20252	Bigorno
2B037	20620	Biguglia
2B039	20235	Bisinchi
2B042	20290	Borgo
2B043	20222	Brando
2B045	20212	Bustanico
2B046	20228	Cagnano
2B047	20224	Calacuccia
2B049	20214	Calenzana
2B050	20260	Calvi
2B051	20244	Cambia
2B052	20229	Campana
2B053	20270	Campi
2B054	20290	Campile
2B055	20252	Campitello
2B057	20230	Canale-di-Verde
2B058	20217	Canari
2B059	20235	Canavaggia
2B063	20229	Carcheto-Brustico
2B067	20229	Carpineto
2B068	20244	Carticasi
2B069	20237	Casabianca
2B072	20215	Casalta
2B073	20224	Casamaccioli
2B074	20250	Casanova
2B075	20270	Casevecchie
2B077	20213	Castellare-di-Casinca
2B078	20212	Castellare-di-Mercurio
2B079	20235	Castello-di-Rostino
2B080	20218	Castifao
2B081	20218	Castiglione
2B082	20218	Castineta
2B083	20236	Castirla
2B084	20225	Cateri
2B086	20238	Centuri
2B087	20221	Cervione
2B088	20230	Chiatra
2B366	20240	Chisa
2B093	20256	Corbara
2B095	20224	Corscia
2B096	20250	Corte
2B097	20226	Costa
2B101	20237	Croce
2B102	20290	Crocicchia
2B105	20212	Erbajolo
2B106	20244	Érone
2B107	20275	Ersa
2B109	20253	Farinole
2B110	20212	Favalello
2B111	20234	Felce
2B112	20225	Feliceto
2B113	20237	Ficaja
2B116	20212	Focicchia
2B120	20600	Furiani
2B121	20245	Galéria
2B122	20218	Gavignano
2B123	20240	Ghisonaccia
2B124	20227	Ghisoni
2B125	20237	Giocatojo
2B126	20251	Giuncaggio
2B134	20220	L'Île-Rousse
2B135	20243	Isolaccio-di-Fiumorbo
2B136	20218	Lama
2B137	20244	Lano
2B138	20225	Lavatoggio
2B140	20252	Lento
2B143	20230	Linguizzetta
2B145	20215	Loreto-di-Casinca
2B147	20224	Lozzi
2B148	20290	Lucciana
2B149	20240	Lugo-di-Nazza
2B150	20260	Lumio
2B152	20228	Luri
2B153	20245	Manso
2B155	20270	Matra
2B156	20259	Mausoléo
2B157	20212	Mazzola
2B159	20287	Meria
2B161	20270	Moïta
2B162	20218	Moltifao
2B164	20229	Monacia-d'Orezza
2B165	20214	Moncale
2B166	20290	Monte
2B167	20214	Montegrosso
2B168	20220	Monticello
2B169	20218	Morosaglia
2B170	20238	Morsiglia
2B171	20219	Muracciole
2B172	20239	Murato
2B173	20225	Muro
2B175	20225	Nessa
2B176	20229	Nocario
2B177	20219	Noceta
2B178	20217	Nonza
2B179	20234	Novale
2B180	20226	Novella
2B182	20226	Occhiatana
2B183	20217	Ogliastro
2B184	20217	Olcani
2B185	20232	Oletta
2B187	20217	Olmeta-di-Capocorso

INSEE code	Postal code	Commune
2B188	20232	Olmeta-di-Tuda
2B190	20259	Olmi-Cappella
2B192	20290	Olmo
2B193	20236	Omessa
2B194	20234	Ortale
2B195	20290	Ortiporio
2B199	20226	Palasca
2B201	20251	Pancheraccia
2B202	20229	Parata
2B205	20253	Patrimonio
2B206	20290	Penta-Acquatella
2B207	20213	Penta-di-Casinca
2B208	20234	Perelli
2B210	20230	Pero-Casevecchie
2B213	20272	Pianello
2B214	20215	Piano
2B216	20234	Piazzali
2B217	20229	Piazzole
2B218	20251	Piedicorte-di-Gaggio
2B219	20229	Piedicroce
2B220	20218	Piedigriggio
2B221	20229	Piedipartino
2B222	20229	Pie-d'Orezza
2B224	20233	Pietracorbara
2B225	20230	Pietra-di-Verde
2B223	20218	Pietralba
2B226	20251	Pietraserena
2B227	20234	Pietricaggio
2B229	20242	Pietroso
2B230	20246	Piève
2B231	20220	Pigna
2B233	20228	Pino
2B234	20234	Piobetta
2B235	20259	Pioggiola
2B236	20240	Poggio-di-Nazza
2B238	20250	Poggio-di-Venaco
2B239	20232	Poggio-d'Oletta
2B241	20237	Poggio-Marinaccio
2B242	20230	Poggio-Mezzana
2B243	20229	Polveroso
2B244	20218	Popolasca
2B245	20215	Porri
2B246	20237	La Porta
2B248	20218	Prato-di-Giovellina
2B250	20290	Prunelli-di-Casacconi
2B251	20243	Prunelli-di-Fiumorbo
2B252	20213	Pruno
2B255	20237	Quercitello
2B256	20229	Rapaggio
2B257	20246	Rapale
2B260	20250	Riventosa
2B261	20247	Rogliano
2B263	20219	Rospigliani
2B264	20244	Rusio
2B265	20239	Rutali
2B298	20217	Saint-Florent
2B267	20218	Saliceto
2B297	20213	San-Damiano
2B299	20213	San-Gavino-d'Ampugnani
2B365	20243	San-Gavino-di-Fiumorbo
2B301	20246	San-Gavino-di-Tenda
2B302	20230	San-Giovanni-di-Moriani
2B303	20230	San-Giuliano
2B304	20244	San-Lorenzo
2B305	20200	San-Martino-di-Lota
2B313	20230	San-Nicolao
2B306	20250	Santa-Lucia-di-Mercurio
2B307	20230	Santa-Lucia-di-Moriani
2B309	20200	Santa-Maria-di-Lota
2B311	20221	Santa-Maria-Poggio
2B292	20212	Sant'Andréa-di-Bozio
2B293	20221	Sant'Andréa-di-Cotone
2B296	20220	Sant'Antonino
2B316	20220	Santa-Reparata-di-Balagna
2B317	20230	Santa-Reparata-di-Moriani
2B314	20246	Santo-Pietro-di-Tenda
2B315	20250	Santo-Pietro-di-Venaco
2B273	20213	Scata
2B274	20290	Scolca
2B275	20212	Sermano
2B277	20243	Serra-di-Fiumorbo
2B280	20215	Silvareccio
2B281	20233	Sisco
2B283	20240	Solaro
2B286	20213	Sorbo-Ocagnano
2B287	20246	Sorio
2B289	20250	Soveria
2B290	20226	Speloncato
2B291	20229	Stazzona
2B318	20230	Taglio-Isolaccio
2B319	20230	Talasani
2B320	20270	Tallone
2B321	20234	Tarrano
2B327	20248	Tomino
2B328	20270	Tox
2B329	20250	Tralonca
2B332	20218	Urtaca
2B333	20232	Vallecalle
2B334	20234	Valle-d'Alesani
2B335	20221	Valle-di-Campoloro
2B337	20235	Valle-di-Rostino
2B338	20229	Valle-d'Orezza
2B339	20259	Vallica
2B340	20230	Velone-Orneto
2B341	20231	Venaco
2B342	20240	Ventiseri
2B343	20215	Venzolasca
2B344	20229	Verdèse
2B346	20215	Vescovato
2B347	20242	Vezzani
2B350	20290	Vignale
2B352	20279	Ville-di-Paraso
2B353	20200	Ville-di-Pietrabugno
2B354	20219	Vivario
2B355	20290	Volpajola
2B356	20272	Zalana
2B361	20214	Zilia
2B364	20272	Zuani
