= Santa-Lucia-di-Moriani =

- Commune
- Location of Santa-Lucia-di-Moriani
- Location within France Location within Corsica
- Coordinates: 42°23′11″N 9°31′49″E
- Country: France
- Region: Corsica
- Department: Haute-Corse
- Arrondissement: Corte
- Canton: Castagniccia
- Intercommunality: Costa Verde

Government
  - Mayor (2020–2026): Vincent Antomarchi
- Area^{1}: 6.22 km^{2} (2.40 sq mi)
- Elevation: 240 m (790 ft)
- Highest elevation: 413 m (1,355 ft)
- Lowest elevation: 0 m (0 ft)
- Population (2023): 1,514
  - Density: 243/km^{2} (630/sq mi)
- Time zone: UTC+01:00 (CET)
  - Summer (DST): UTC+02:00 (CEST)
- INSEE/Postal code: 2B307 /20230
- ^{1} French Land Register data, which excludes lakes, ponds, glaciers > 1 km^{2} (0.386 sq mi or 247 acres) and river estuaries.

Santa-Lucia-di-Moriani is a commune in the Haute-Corse department of France on the island of Corsica.

== Population ==
Historical population
Year	Pop.	±% p.a.
1968	235	—
1975	291	+3.10%
1982	543	+9.32%
1990	772	+4.50%
1999	1,003	+2.95%
2007	1,247	+2.76%
2012	1,199	−0.78%
2017	1,428	+3.56%
2023	1,514	+0.98%
Source: INSEE

== See also ==
- Communes of the Haute-Corse department
