= Campana, Haute-Corse =

Campana A Campana
- Commune
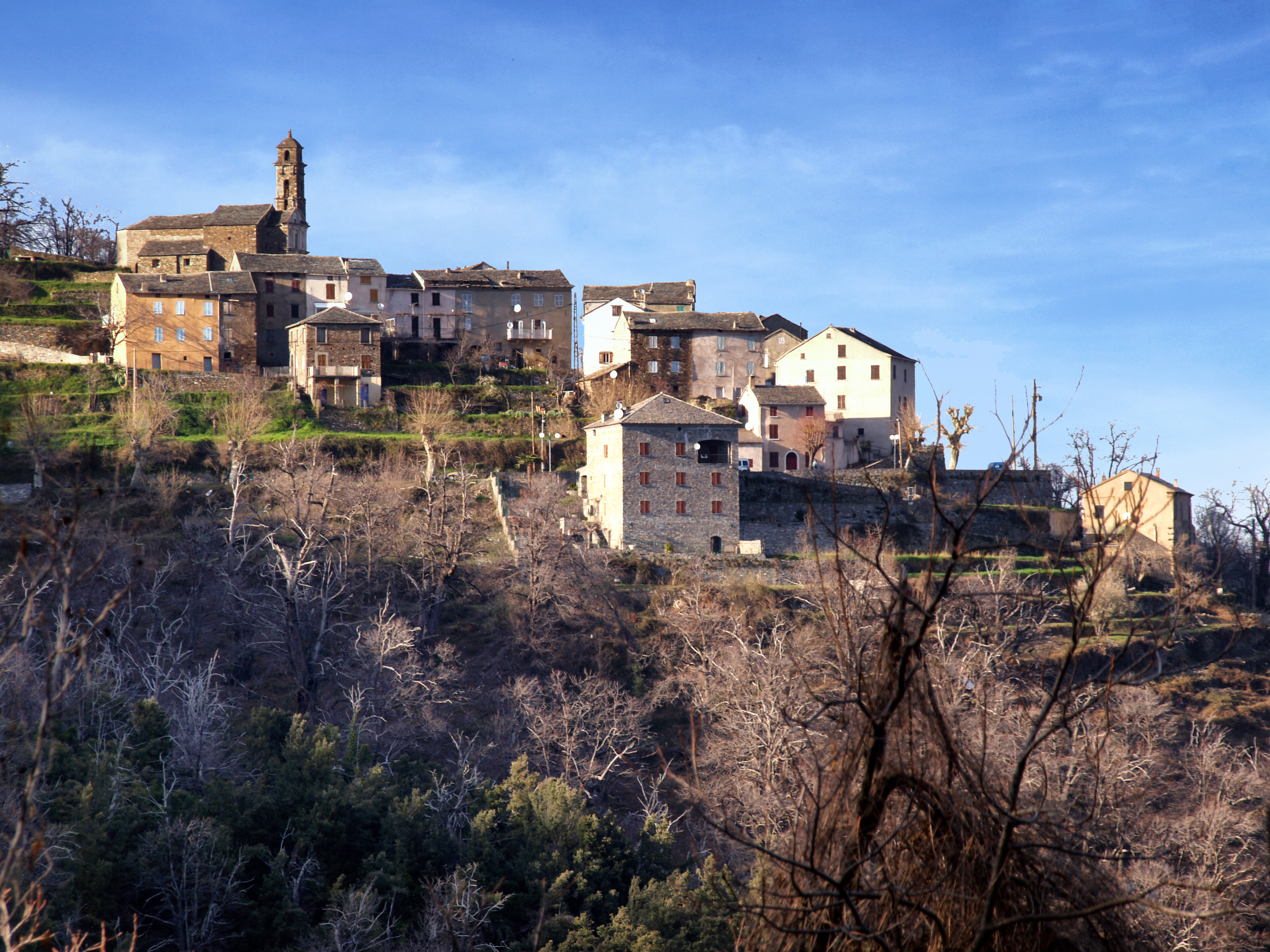
- The church and surrounding buildings in Campana village
- Location of Campana
- Location within France Location within Corsica
- Coordinates: 42°23′19″N 9°21′06″E
- Country: France
- Region: Corsica
- Department: Haute-Corse
- Arrondissement: Corte
- Canton: Castagniccia

Government
  - Mayor (2020–2026): Françoise Campana
- Area^{1}: 2.37 km^{2} (0.92 sq mi)
- Elevation: 750 m (2,460 ft)
- Highest elevation: 1,766 m (5,794 ft)
- Lowest elevation: 640 m (2,100 ft)
- Population (2023): 22
  - Density: 9.3/km^{2} (24/sq mi)
- Time zone: UTC+01:00 (CET)
  - Summer (DST): UTC+02:00 (CEST)
- INSEE/Postal code: 2B052 /20229
- ^{1} French Land Register data, which excludes lakes, ponds, glaciers > 1 km^{2} (0.386 sq mi or 247 acres) and river estuaries.

Campana is a commune in the Haute-Corse department of France on the island of Corsica.

== Population ==
Historical population
Year	Pop.	±% p.a.
1968	50	—
1975	33	−5.76%
1982	20	−6.90%
1990	36	+7.62%
1999	24	−4.41%
2007	23	−0.53%
2012	20	−2.76%
2017	18	−2.09%
2023	22	+3.40%
Source: INSEE

== See also ==
- Communes of the Haute-Corse department
