= Parata =

- Commune
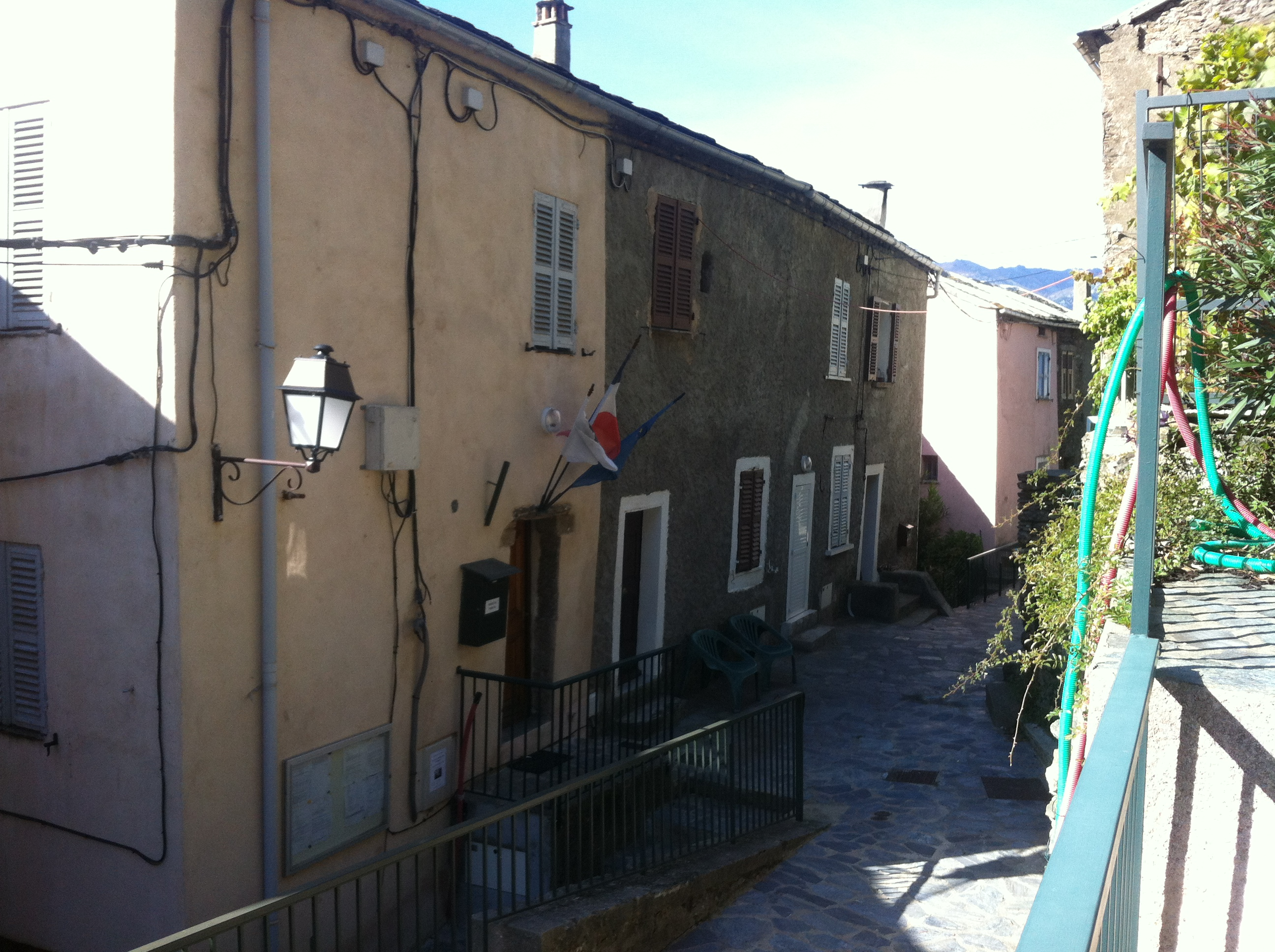
- Town hall
- Location of Parata
- Location within France Location within Corsica
- Coordinates: 42°22′15″N 9°24′34″E
- Country: France
- Region: Corsica
- Department: Haute-Corse
- Arrondissement: Corte
- Canton: Castagniccia

Government
  - Mayor (2020–2026): Laurence Leoni Maziere
- Area^{1}: 2.83 km^{2} (1.09 sq mi)
- Elevation: 550 m (1,800 ft)
- Highest elevation: 1,248 m (4,094 ft)
- Lowest elevation: 417 m (1,368 ft)
- Population (2023): 22
  - Density: 7.8/km^{2} (20/sq mi)
- Time zone: UTC+01:00 (CET)
  - Summer (DST): UTC+02:00 (CEST)
- INSEE/Postal code: 2B202 /20229
- ^{1} French Land Register data, which excludes lakes, ponds, glaciers > 1 km^{2} (0.386 sq mi or 247 acres) and river estuaries.

Parata (French pronunciation: [paʁata]; Corsican: A Parata) is a commune in the Haute-Corse department of France on the island of Corsica.

== Population ==
Historical population
Year	Pop.	±% p.a.
1968	50	—
1975	45	−1.49%
1982	35	−3.53%
1990	25	−4.12%
1999	27	+0.86%
2007	33	+2.54%
2012	31	−1.24%
2017	24	−4.99%
2023	22	−1.44%
Source: INSEE

== See also ==
- Communes of the Haute-Corse department
