= Verdèse =

- Commune
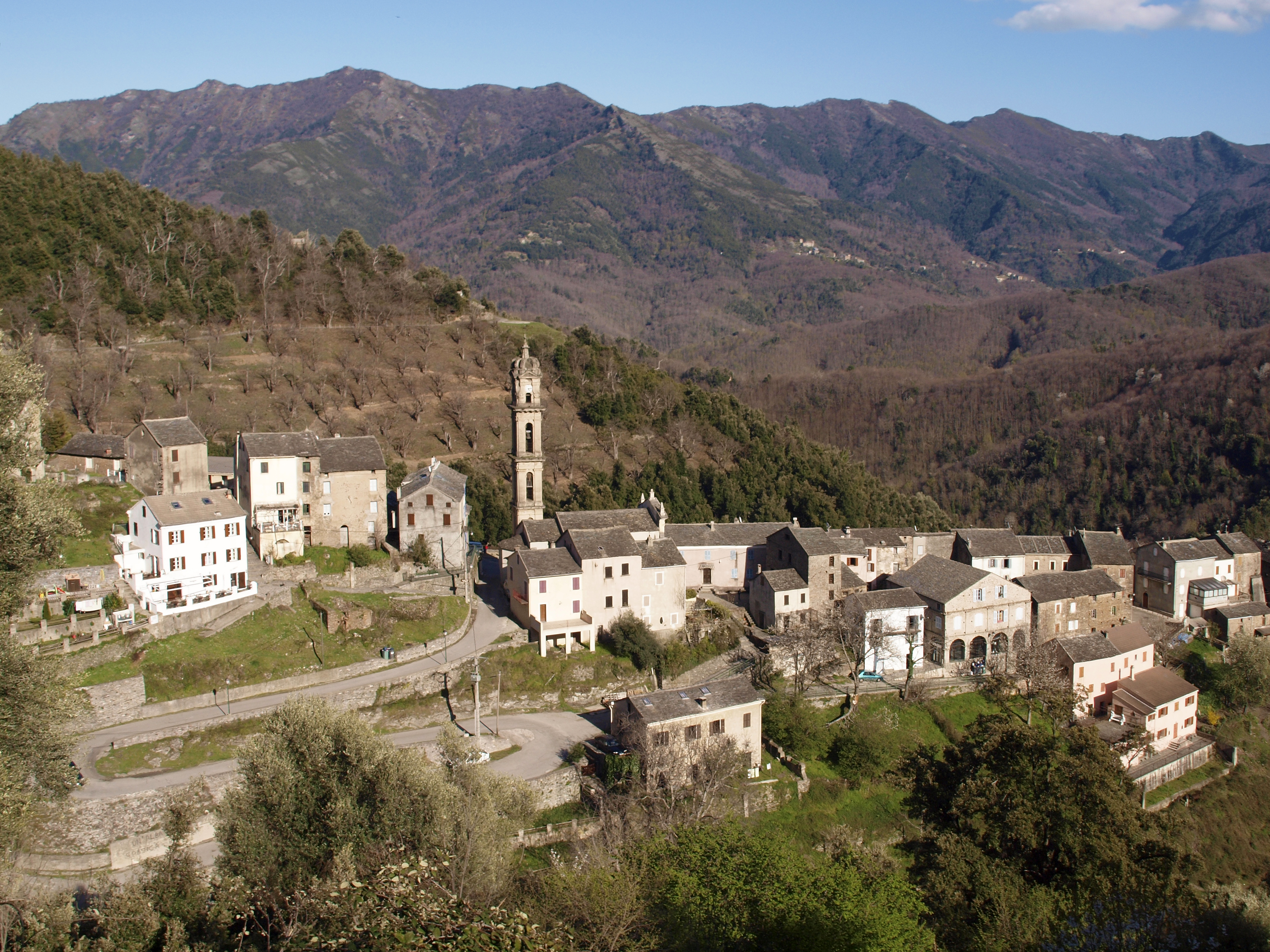
- The church and surrounding buildings in Verdèse
- Location of Verdèse
- Location within France Location within Corsica
- Coordinates: 42°23′33″N 9°21′55″E
- Country: France
- Region: Corsica
- Department: Haute-Corse
- Arrondissement: Corte
- Canton: Castagniccia

Government
  - Mayor (2021–2026): Joseph Antoine Mattei
- Area^{1}: 1.02 km^{2} (0.39 sq mi)
- Elevation: 480 m (1,570 ft)
- Highest elevation: 653 m (2,142 ft)
- Lowest elevation: 318 m (1,043 ft)
- Population (2023): 42
  - Density: 41/km^{2} (110/sq mi)
- Time zone: UTC+01:00 (CET)
  - Summer (DST): UTC+02:00 (CEST)
- INSEE/Postal code: 2B344 /20229
- ^{1} French Land Register data, which excludes lakes, ponds, glaciers > 1 km^{2} (0.386 sq mi or 247 acres) and river estuaries.

Verdèse (French pronunciation: [vɛʁdɛz]) is a commune in the Haute-Corse department of France on the island of Corsica.

== Population ==
Historical population
Year	Pop.	±% p.a.
1968	75	—
1975	44	−7.34%
1982	35	−3.22%
1990	11	−13.47%
1999	18	+5.62%
2007	29	+6.14%
2012	38	+5.55%
2017	37	−0.53%
2023	42	+2.14%
Source: INSEE

== See also ==
- Communes of the Haute-Corse department
