= Stazzona, Haute-Corse =

Stazzona
- Commune
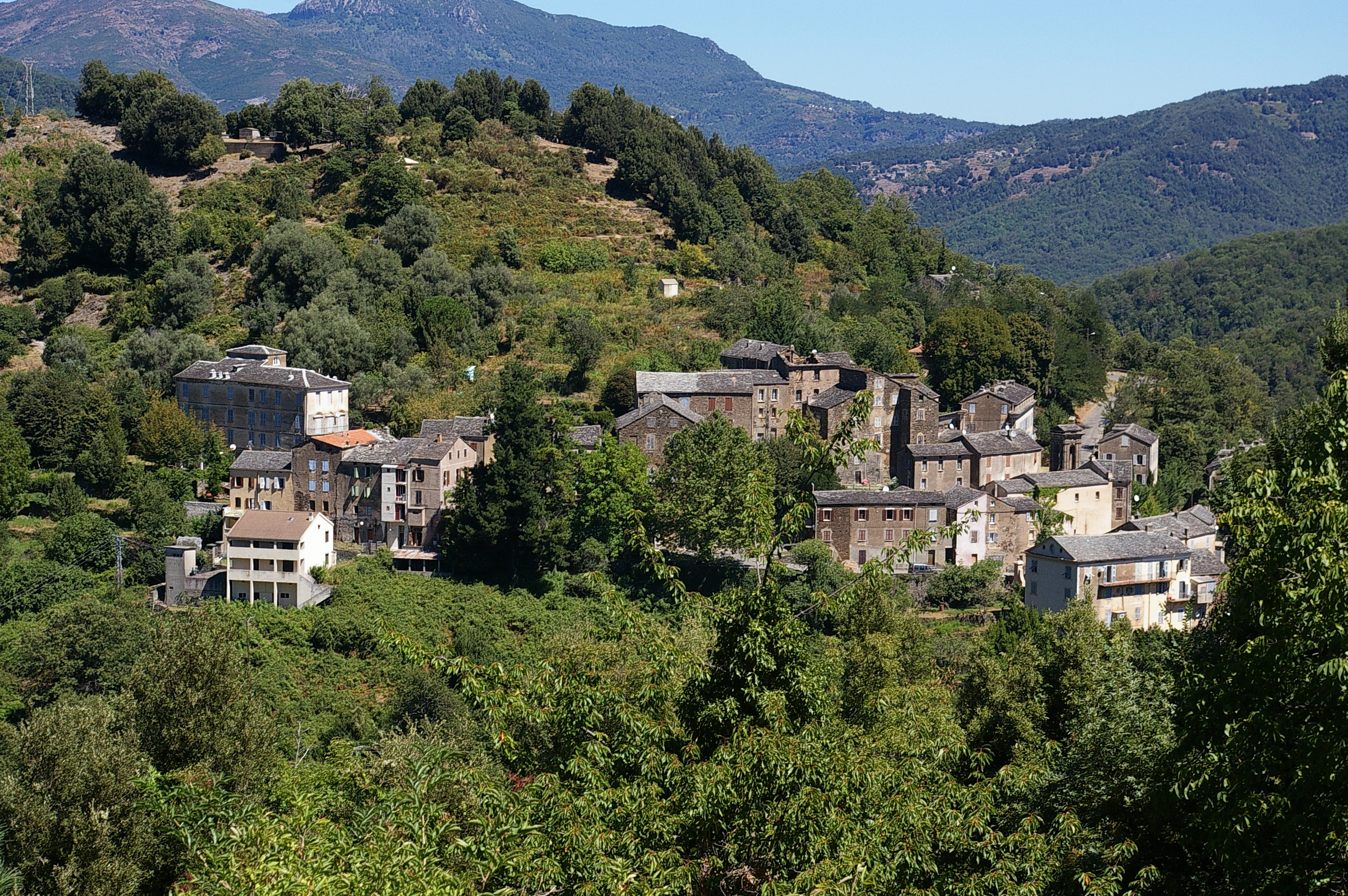
- Location of Stazzona
- Location within France Location within Corsica
- Coordinates: 42°22′20″N 9°22′20″E
- Country: France
- Region: Corsica
- Department: Haute-Corse
- Arrondissement: Corte
- Canton: Castagniccia

Government
  - Mayor (2020–2026): Etienne Raffalli
- Area^{1}: 1.39 km^{2} (0.54 sq mi)
- Elevation: 546 m (1,791 ft)
- Highest elevation: 581 m (1,906 ft)
- Lowest elevation: 309 m (1,014 ft)
- Population (2023): 38
  - Density: 27/km^{2} (71/sq mi)
- Time zone: UTC+01:00 (CET)
  - Summer (DST): UTC+02:00 (CEST)
- INSEE/Postal code: 2B291 /20229
- ^{1} French Land Register data, which excludes lakes, ponds, glaciers > 1 km^{2} (0.386 sq mi or 247 acres) and river estuaries.

Stazzona is a commune in the Haute-Corse department of France on the island of Corsica.

== Population ==
Historical population
Year	Pop.	±% p.a.
1968	82	—
1975	57	−5.06%
1982	50	−1.85%
1990	35	−4.36%
1999	33	−0.65%
2007	38	+1.78%
2012	41	+1.53%
2017	39	−1.00%
2023	38	−0.43%
Source: INSEE

== See also ==
- Communes of the Haute-Corse department
