= Nocario =

- Commune
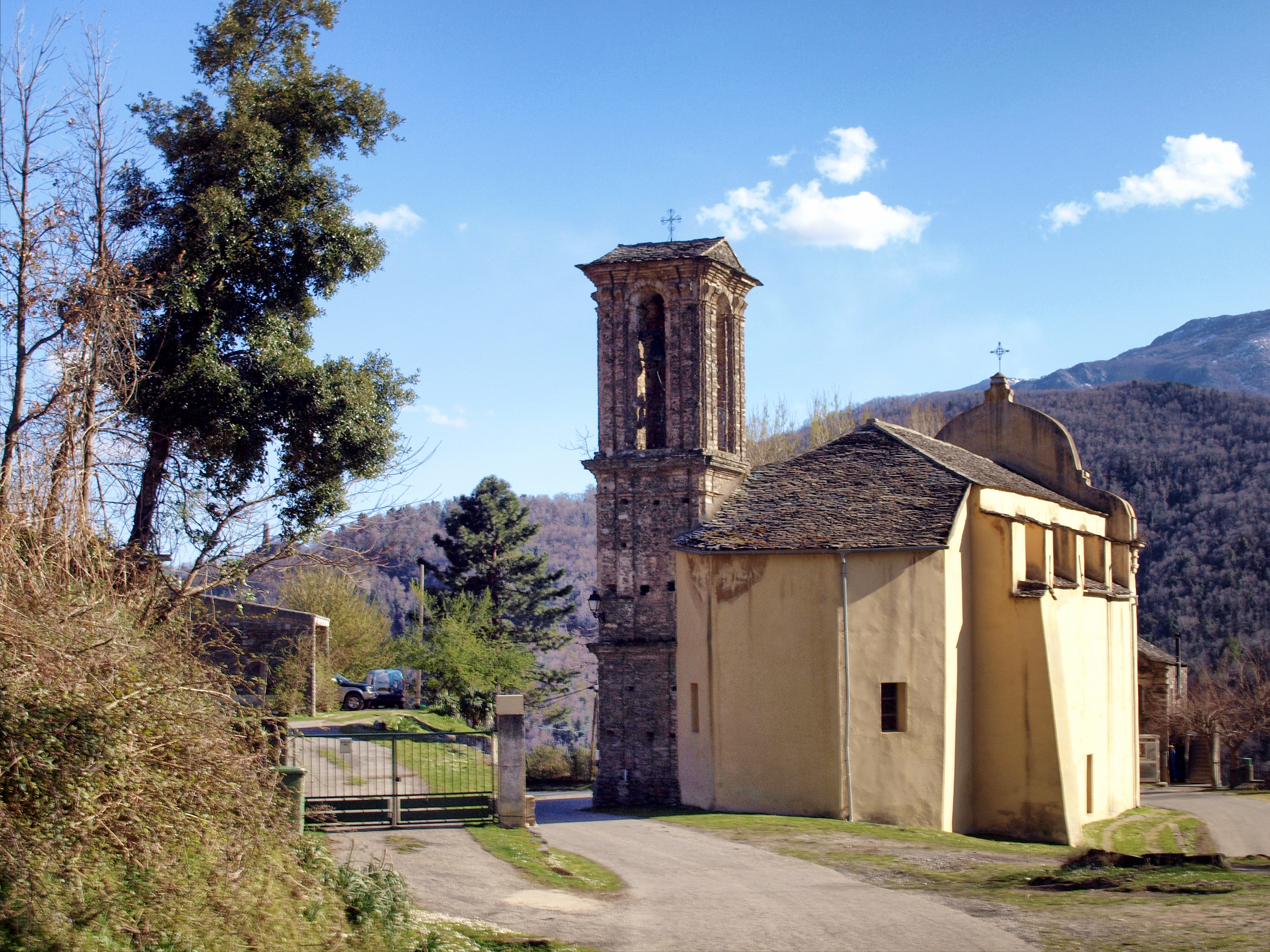
- The parish church of Saint-Michel, in Nocario
- Location of Nocario
- Location within France Location within Corsica
- Coordinates: 42°23′58″N 9°21′06″E
- Country: France
- Region: Corsica
- Department: Haute-Corse
- Arrondissement: Corte
- Canton: Castagniccia

Government
  - Mayor (2020–2026): Paul Battesti
- Area^{1}: 3.08 km^{2} (1.19 sq mi)
- Elevation: 600 m (2,000 ft)
- Highest elevation: 1,766 m (5,794 ft)
- Lowest elevation: 459 m (1,506 ft)
- Population (2023): 74
  - Density: 24/km^{2} (62/sq mi)
- Time zone: UTC+01:00 (CET)
  - Summer (DST): UTC+02:00 (CEST)
- INSEE/Postal code: 2B176 /20229
- ^{1} French Land Register data, which excludes lakes, ponds, glaciers > 1 km^{2} (0.386 sq mi or 247 acres) and river estuaries.

Nocario (French pronunciation: [nɔkaʁjo]; Corsican: Nucariu) is a commune in the Haute-Corse department of France on the island of Corsica.

== Population ==
Historical population
Year	Pop.	±% p.a.
1968	90	—
1975	70	−3.53%
1982	41	−7.36%
1990	33	−2.68%
1999	42	+2.72%
2007	54	+3.19%
2012	60	+2.13%
2017	66	+1.92%
2023	74	+1.93%
Source: INSEE

== See also ==
- Communes of the Haute-Corse department
