= Valle-di-Rostino =

- Commune
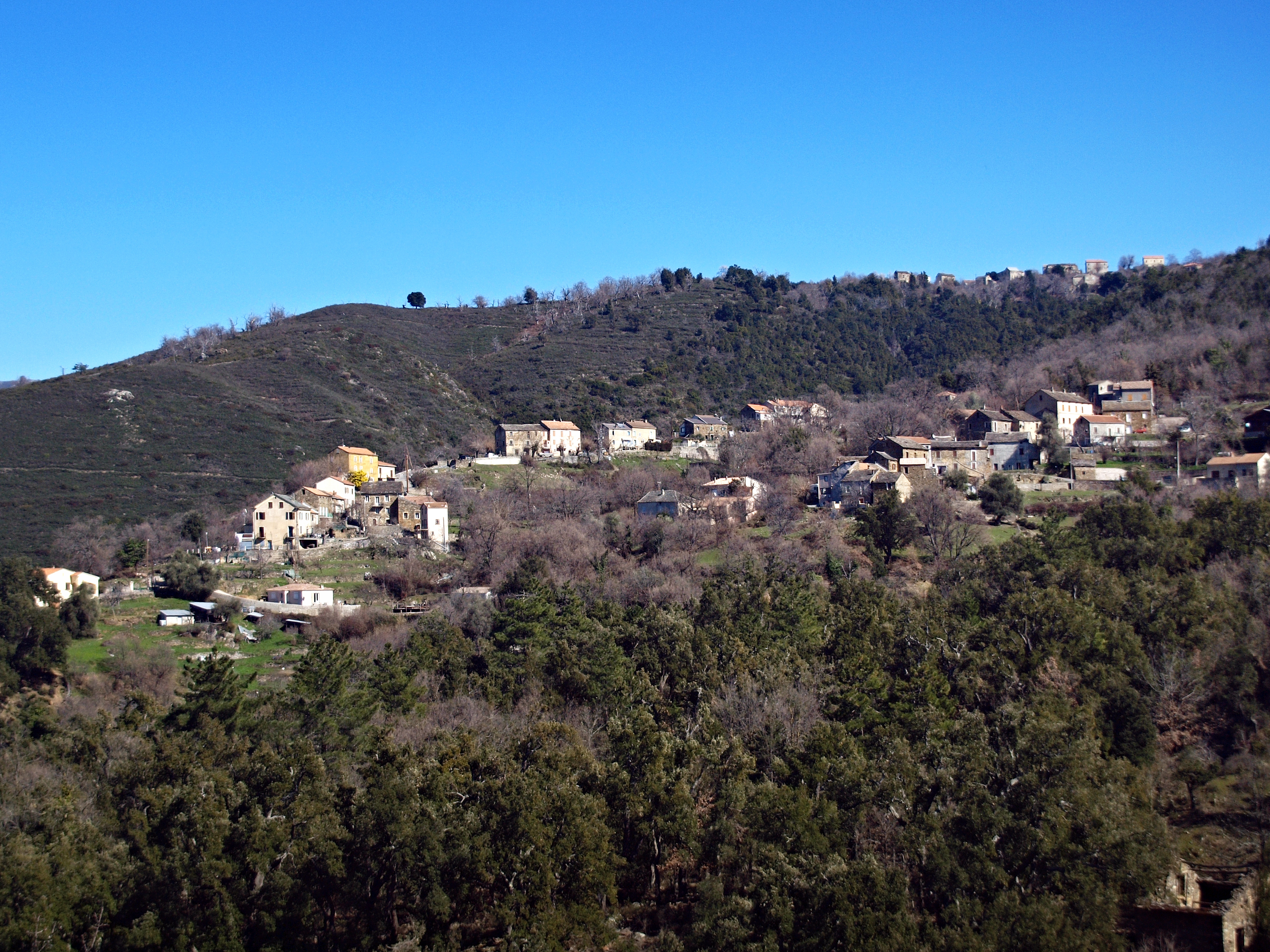
- A general view of Valle-di-Rostino
- Location of Valle-di-Rostino
- Location within France Location within Corsica
- Coordinates: 42°27′36″N 9°16′52″E
- Country: France
- Region: Corsica
- Department: Haute-Corse
- Arrondissement: Corte
- Canton: Golo-Morosaglia

Government
  - Mayor (2020–2026): Christian Moracchini
- Area^{1}: 15.6 km^{2} (6.0 sq mi)
- Elevation: 600 m (2,000 ft)
- Highest elevation: 1,155 m (3,789 ft)
- Lowest elevation: 159 m (522 ft)
- Population (2023): 167
  - Density: 10.7/km^{2} (27.7/sq mi)
- Time zone: UTC+01:00 (CET)
  - Summer (DST): UTC+02:00 (CEST)
- INSEE/Postal code: 2B337 /20235
- ^{1} French Land Register data, which excludes lakes, ponds, glaciers > 1 km^{2} (0.386 sq mi or 247 acres) and river estuaries.

Valle-di-Rostino is a commune in the Haute-Corse department of France on the island of Corsica.

== Population ==
Historical population
Year	Pop.	±% p.a.
1968	131	—
1975	115	−1.84%
1982	108	−0.89%
1990	83	−3.24%
1999	83	+0.00%
2007	126	+5.36%
2012	114	−1.98%
2017	132	+2.98%
2023	167	+4.00%
Source: INSEE

== See also ==
- Communes of the Haute-Corse department
