= Quercitello =

- Commune
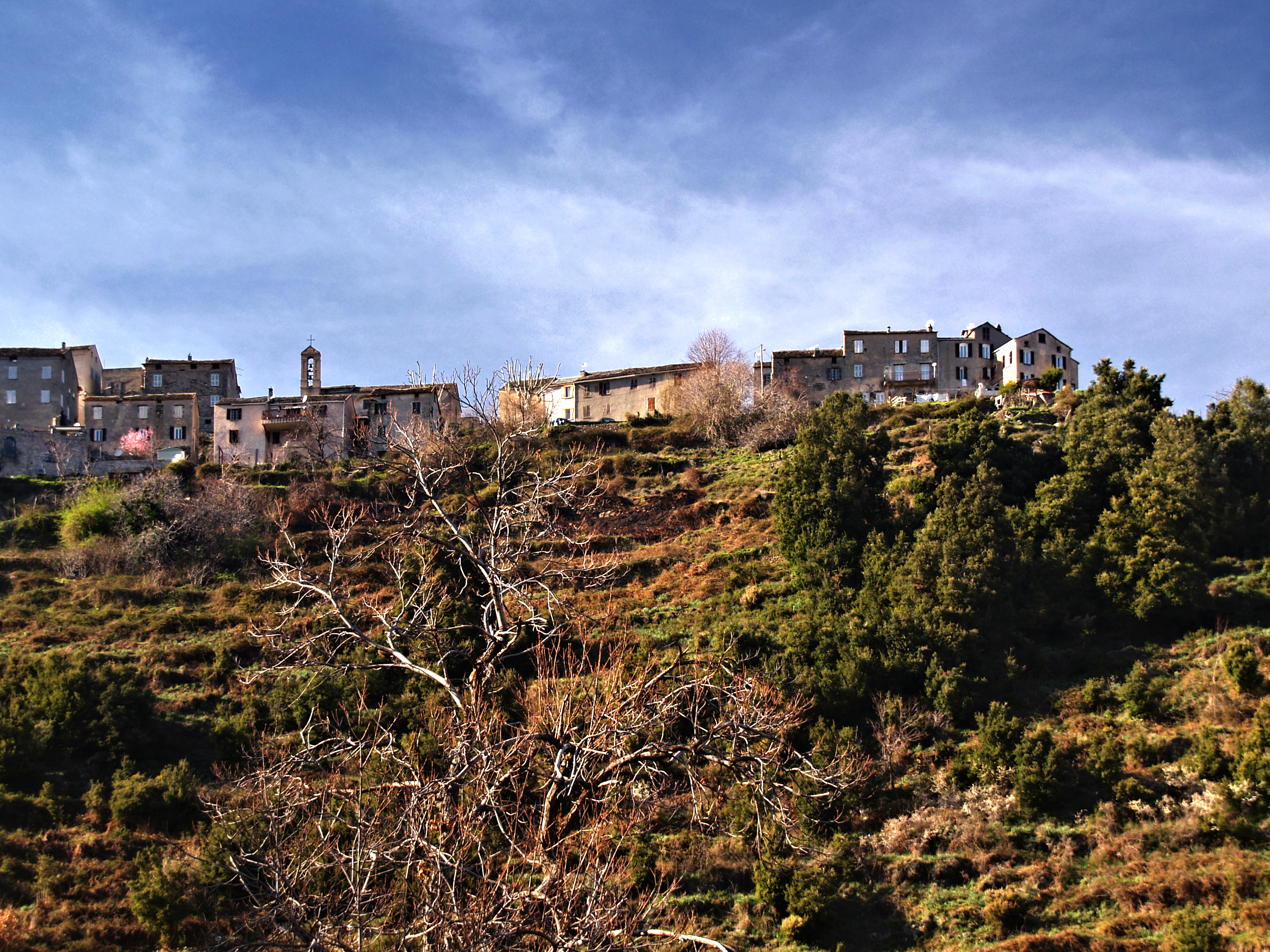
- A general view of Quercitello
- Location of Quercitello
- Location within France Location within Corsica
- Coordinates: 42°25′37″N 9°21′02″E
- Country: France
- Region: Corsica
- Department: Haute-Corse
- Arrondissement: Corte
- Canton: Casinca-Fumalto

Government
  - Mayor (2020–2026): Paul Louis Giannecchini
- Area^{1}: 3 km^{2} (1.2 sq mi)
- Elevation: 650 m (2,130 ft)
- Highest elevation: 1,240 m (4,070 ft)
- Lowest elevation: 318 m (1,043 ft)
- Population (2023): 53
  - Density: 18/km^{2} (46/sq mi)
- Time zone: UTC+01:00 (CET)
  - Summer (DST): UTC+02:00 (CEST)
- INSEE/Postal code: 2B255 /20237
- ^{1} French Land Register data, which excludes lakes, ponds, glaciers > 1 km^{2} (0.386 sq mi or 247 acres) and river estuaries.

Quercitello (Corsican: U Quercitellu) is a commune in the Haute-Corse department of France on the island of Corsica.

== Population ==
Historical population
Year	Pop.	±% p.a.
1968	126	—
1975	87	−5.15%
1982	53	−6.84%
1990	37	−4.39%
1999	40	+0.87%
2007	54	+3.82%
2012	50	−1.53%
2017	44	−2.52%
2023	53	+3.15%
Source: INSEE

== See also ==
- Communes of the Haute-Corse department
