= Carpineto =

- Commune
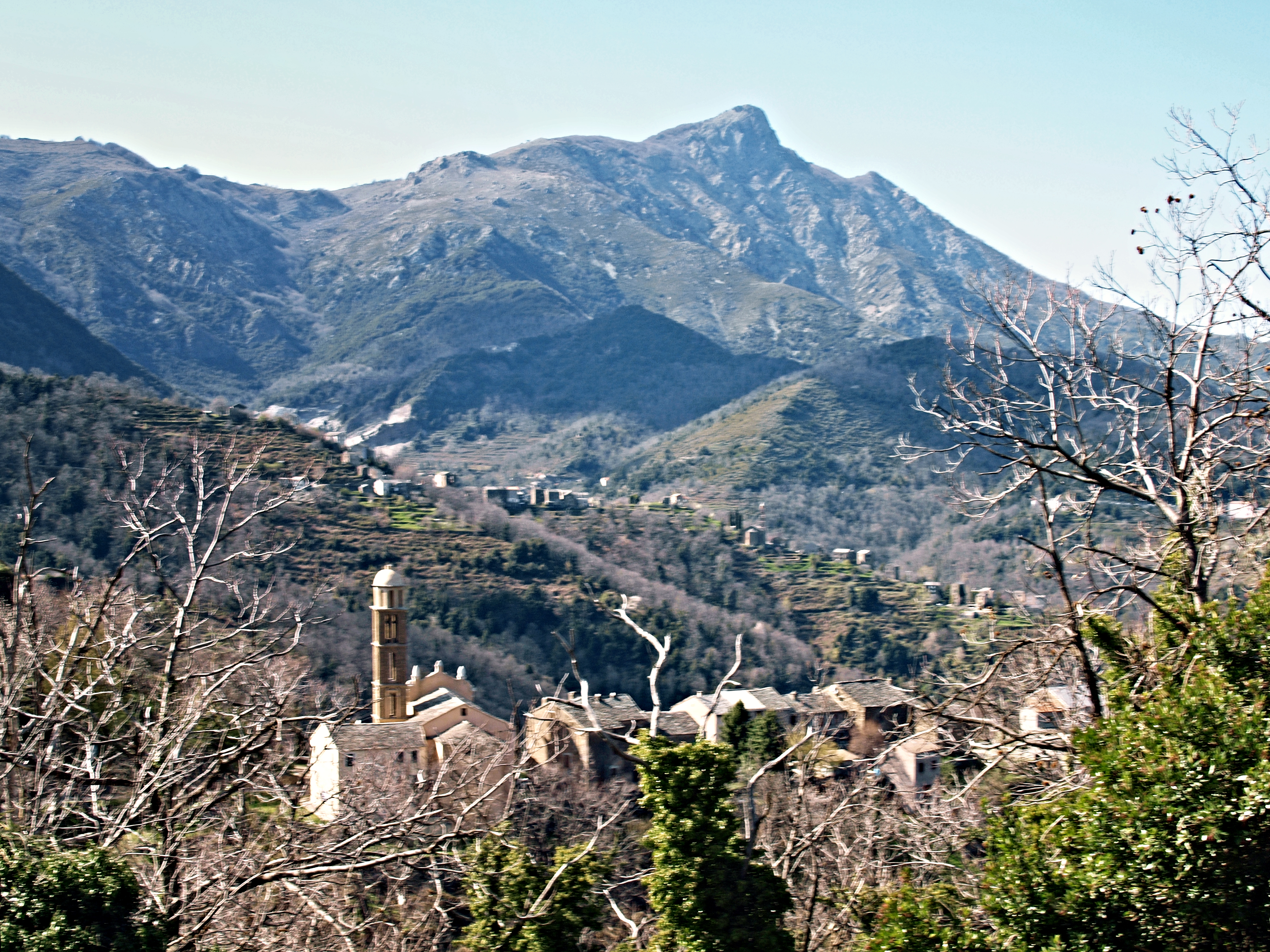
- Castagniccia village in Carpineto, with Carcheto and Monte San Petrone in the background
- Location of Carpineto
- Location within France Location within Corsica
- Coordinates: 42°21′21″N 9°22′49″E
- Country: France
- Region: Corsica
- Department: Haute-Corse
- Arrondissement: Corte
- Canton: Castagniccia

Government
  - Mayor (2020–2026): Marcel Ferrari
- Area^{1}: 2.44 km^{2} (0.94 sq mi)
- Elevation: 700 m (2,300 ft)
- Highest elevation: 922 m (3,025 ft)
- Lowest elevation: 477 m (1,565 ft)
- Population (2023): 38
  - Density: 16/km^{2} (40/sq mi)
- Time zone: UTC+01:00 (CET)
  - Summer (DST): UTC+02:00 (CEST)
- INSEE/Postal code: 2B067 /20229
- ^{1} French Land Register data, which excludes lakes, ponds, glaciers > 1 km^{2} (0.386 sq mi or 247 acres) and river estuaries.

Carpineto is a commune in the Haute-Corse department of France on the island of Corsica.

== Population ==
Historical population
Year	Pop.	±% p.a.
1968	71	—
1975	36	−9.25%
1982	29	−3.04%
1990	15	−7.91%
1999	11	−3.39%
2007	24	+10.24%
2012	29	+3.86%
2017	33	+2.62%
2023	38	+2.38%
Source: INSEE

== See also ==
- Communes of the Haute-Corse department
