= Santa-Maria-Poggio =

- Commune
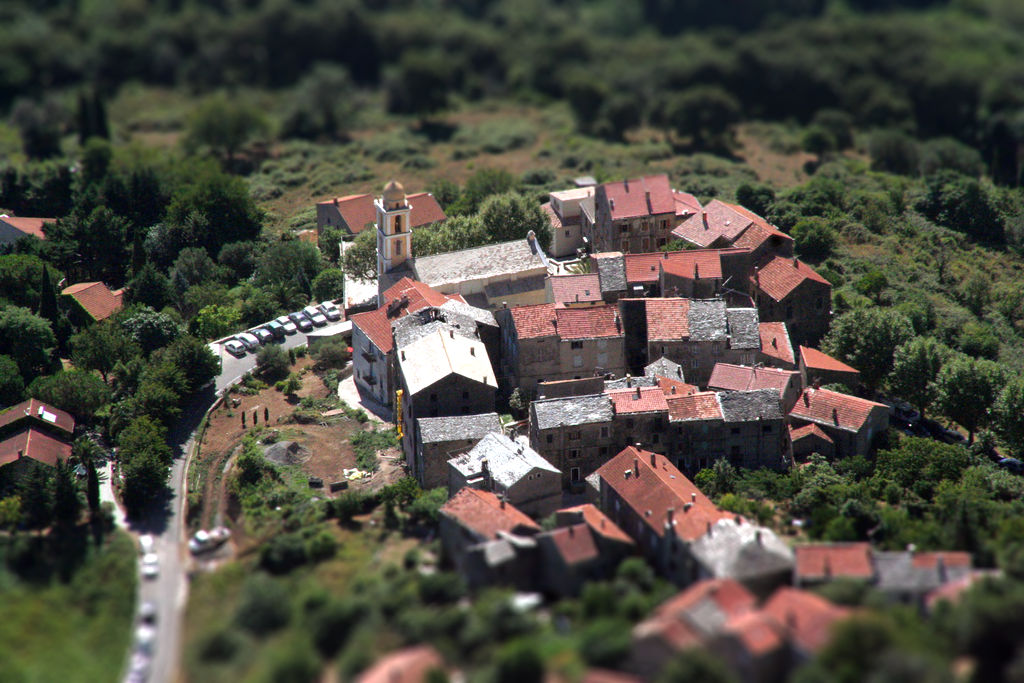
- An aerial view of Santa-Maria-Poggio
- Location of Santa-Maria-Poggio
- Location within France Location within Corsica
- Coordinates: 42°20′49″N 9°29′45″E
- Country: France
- Region: Corsica
- Department: Haute-Corse
- Arrondissement: Corte
- Canton: Castagniccia
- Intercommunality: Costa Verde

Government
  - Mayor (2020–2026): François Mela
- Area^{1}: 10.28 km^{2} (3.97 sq mi)
- Elevation: 300 m (980 ft)
- Highest elevation: 1,131 m (3,711 ft)
- Lowest elevation: 0 m (0 ft)
- Population (2023): 807
  - Density: 78.5/km^{2} (203/sq mi)
- Demonym: Poghjulacci
- Time zone: UTC+01:00 (CET)
  - Summer (DST): UTC+02:00 (CEST)
- INSEE/Postal code: 2B311 /20221
- ^{1} French Land Register data, which excludes lakes, ponds, glaciers > 1 km^{2} (0.386 sq mi or 247 acres) and river estuaries.

Santa-Maria-Poggio is a commune in the Haute-Corse department of France on the island of Corsica.

== Population ==
Historical population
Year	Pop.	±% p.a.
1968	222	—
1975	309	+4.84%
1982	456	+5.72%
1990	600	+3.49%
1999	629	+0.53%
2007	649	+0.39%
2012	657	+0.25%
2017	743	+2.49%
2023	807	+1.39%
Source: INSEE

== See also ==
- Communes of the Haute-Corse department
