= Piazzali =

- Commune
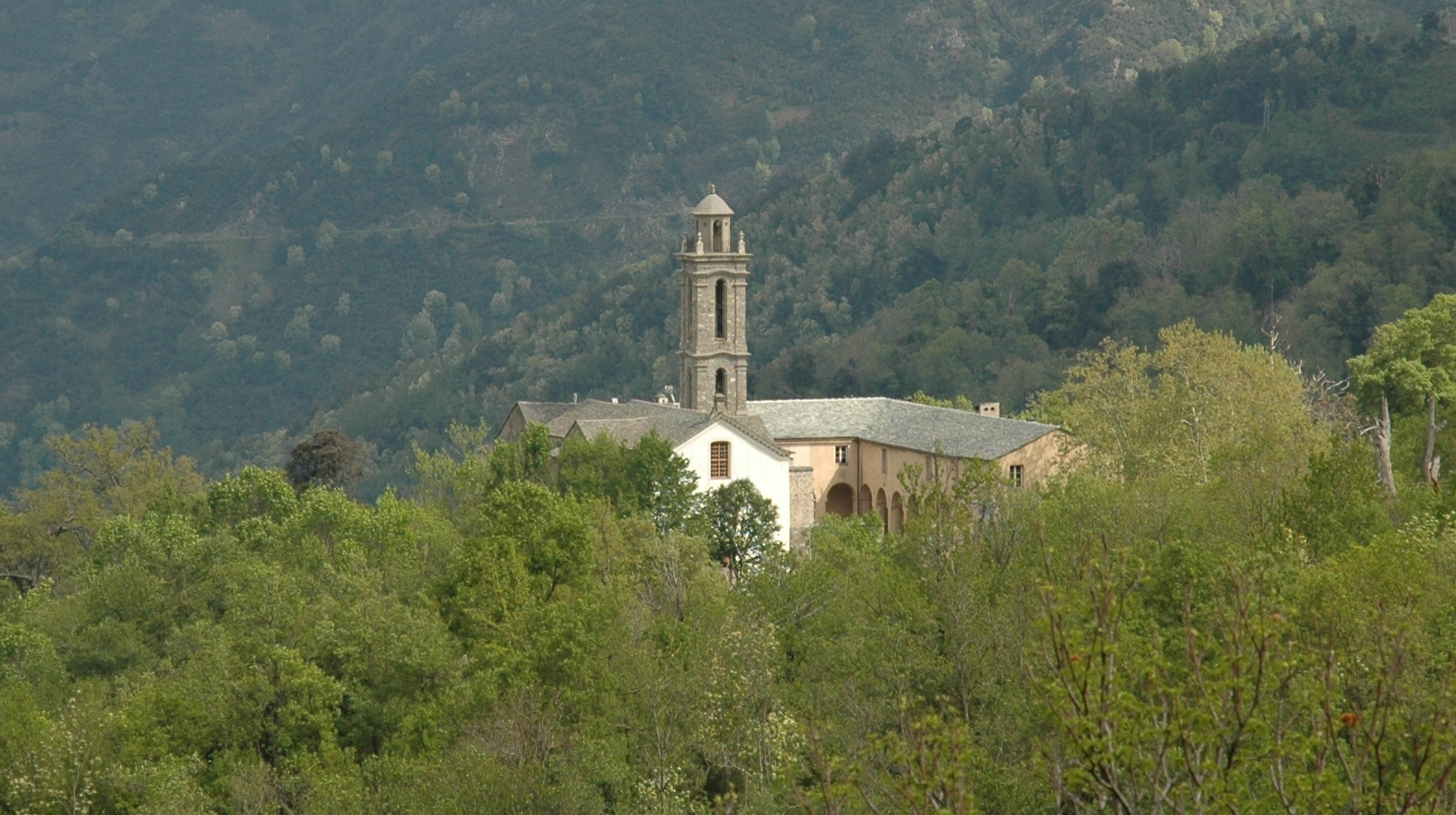
- Convent of Alisgiani, in Piazzali
- Location of Piazzali
- Location within France Location within Corsica
- Coordinates: 42°19′11″N 9°24′33″E
- Country: France
- Region: Corsica
- Department: Haute-Corse
- Arrondissement: Corte
- Canton: Castagniccia

Government
  - Mayor (2020–2026): Marc Tartuffo
- Area^{1}: 0.7 km^{2} (0.27 sq mi)
- Elevation: 400 m (1,300 ft)
- Highest elevation: 602 m (1,975 ft)
- Lowest elevation: 386 m (1,266 ft)
- Population (2023): 19
  - Density: 27/km^{2} (70/sq mi)
- Time zone: UTC+01:00 (CET)
  - Summer (DST): UTC+02:00 (CEST)
- INSEE/Postal code: 2B216 /20234
- ^{1} French Land Register data, which excludes lakes, ponds, glaciers > 1 km^{2} (0.386 sq mi or 247 acres) and river estuaries.

Piazzali is a commune in the Haute-Corse department of France on the island of Corsica.

== Population ==
Historical population
| Year | Pop. | ±% p.a. |
|---|---|---|
| 1968 | 39 | — |
| 1975 | 38 | −0.37% |
| 1982 | 33 | −2.00% |
| 1990 | 11 | −12.83% |
| 1999 | 13 | +1.87% |
| 2007 | 14 | +0.93% |
| 2012 | 17 | +3.96% |
| 2017 | 17 | +0.00% |
| 2023 | 19 | +1.87% |
Source: INSEE

== See also ==
- Communes of the Haute-Corse department
