= Novale =

- Commune
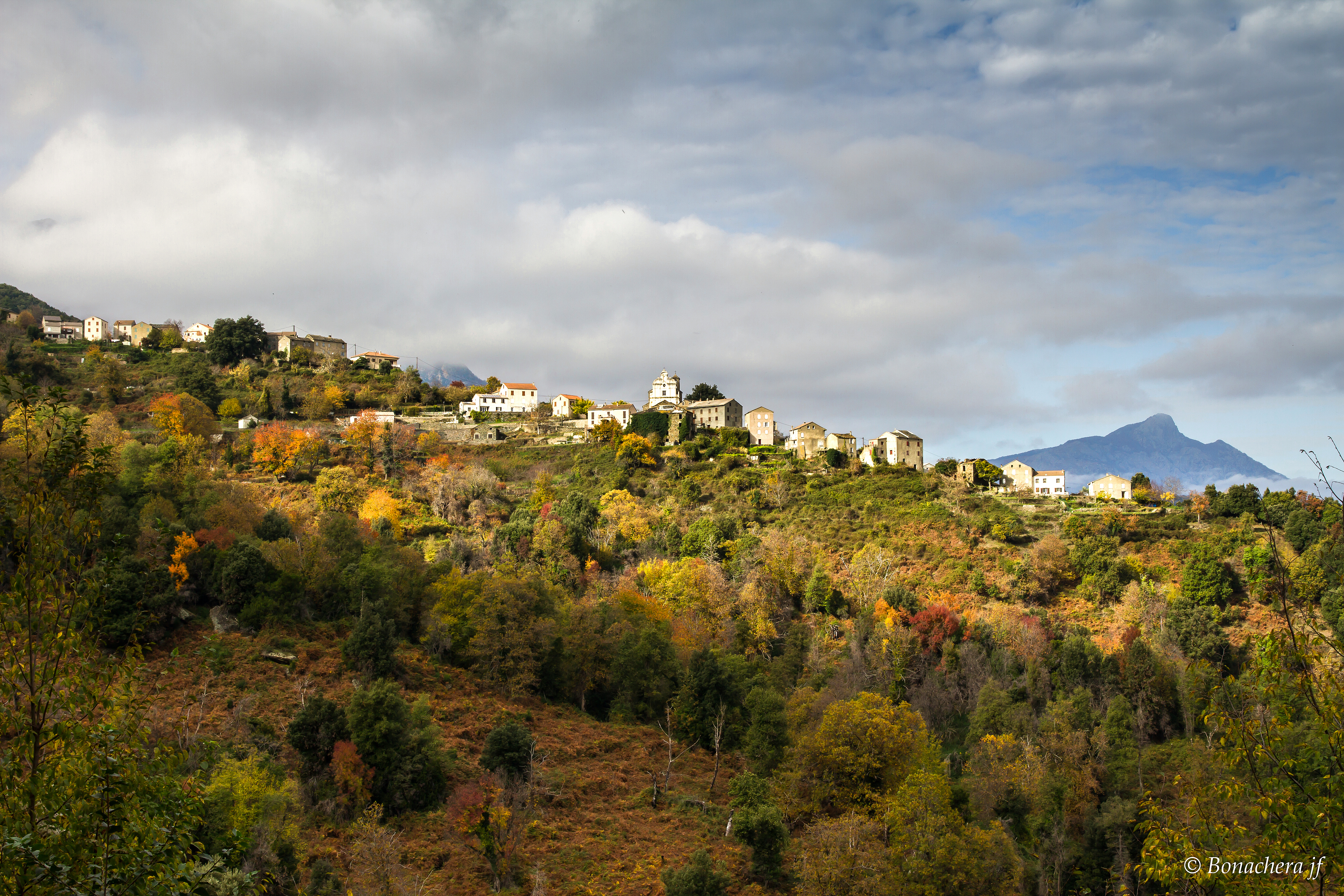
- A view of Novale, with Monte San Petrone in the background
- Location of Novale
- Location within France Location within Corsica
- Coordinates: 42°18′39″N 9°24′57″E
- Country: France
- Region: Corsica
- Department: Haute-Corse
- Arrondissement: Corte
- Canton: Castagniccia

Government
  - Mayor (2020–2026): Antoine Tramini
- Area^{1}: 4.88 km^{2} (1.88 sq mi)
- Elevation: 600 m (2,000 ft)
- Highest elevation: 1,267 m (4,157 ft)
- Lowest elevation: 320 m (1,050 ft)
- Population (2023): 57
  - Density: 12/km^{2} (30/sq mi)
- Time zone: UTC+01:00 (CET)
  - Summer (DST): UTC+02:00 (CEST)
- INSEE/Postal code: 2B179 /20234
- ^{1} French Land Register data, which excludes lakes, ponds, glaciers > 1 km^{2} (0.386 sq mi or 247 acres) and river estuaries.

Novale is a commune in the Haute-Corse department of France on the island of Corsica.

== Population ==
Historical population
Year	Pop.	±% p.a.
1968	96	—
1975	91	−0.76%
1982	89	−0.32%
1990	68	−3.31%
1999	69	+0.16%
2007	52	−3.47%
2012	53	+0.38%
2017	62	+3.19%
2023	57	−1.39%
Source: INSEE

== See also ==
- Communes of the Haute-Corse department
