= Tarrano =

Tarrano Tàrranu
- Commune
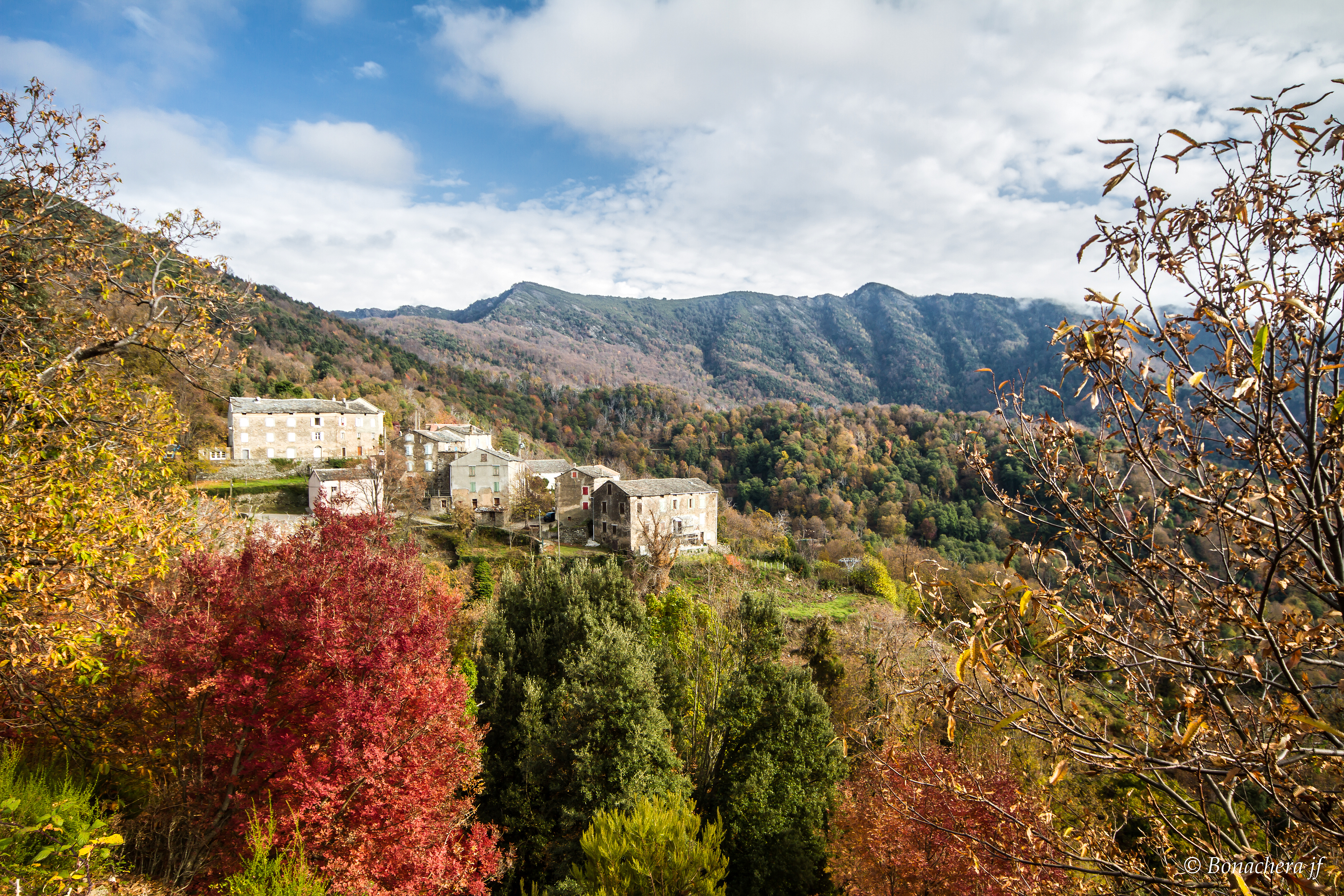
- The village of Tarrano
- Location of Tarrano
- Location within France Location within Corsica
- Coordinates: 42°21′02″N 9°24′08″E
- Country: France
- Region: Corsica
- Department: Haute-Corse
- Arrondissement: Corte
- Canton: Castagniccia
- Intercommunality: Costa Verde

Government
  - Mayor (2020–2026): Charles-Jean Catani
- Area^{1}: 3.83 km^{2} (1.48 sq mi)
- Elevation: 800 m (2,600 ft)
- Highest elevation: 1,050 m (3,440 ft)
- Lowest elevation: 466 m (1,529 ft)
- Population (2023): 16
  - Density: 4.2/km^{2} (11/sq mi)
- Time zone: UTC+01:00 (CET)
  - Summer (DST): UTC+02:00 (CEST)
- INSEE/Postal code: 2B321 /20234
- ^{1} French Land Register data, which excludes lakes, ponds, glaciers > 1 km^{2} (0.386 sq mi or 247 acres) and river estuaries.

Tarrano (French pronunciation: [taʁano]; Corsican: Tàrranu) is a commune in the Haute-Corse department of France on the island of Corsica.

== Population ==
Historical population
Year	Pop.	±% p.a.
1968	121	—
1975	41	−14.32%
1982	16	−12.58%
1990	23	+4.64%
1999	27	+1.80%
2007	16	−6.33%
2012	15	−1.28%
2017	16	+1.30%
2023	16	+0.00%
Source: INSEE

== See also ==
- Communes of the Haute-Corse department
