= Pietricaggio =

- Commune
- Location of Pietricaggio
- Location within France Location within Corsica
- Coordinates: 42°20′10″N 9°23′24″E
- Country: France
- Region: Corsica
- Department: Haute-Corse
- Arrondissement: Corte
- Canton: Castagniccia

Government
  - Mayor (2020–2026): Bernard Marchetti
- Area^{1}: 5.44 km^{2} (2.10 sq mi)
- Elevation: 635 m (2,083 ft)
- Highest elevation: 1,680 m (5,510 ft)
- Lowest elevation: 461 m (1,512 ft)
- Population (2023): 32
  - Density: 5.9/km^{2} (15/sq mi)
- Time zone: UTC+01:00 (CET)
  - Summer (DST): UTC+02:00 (CEST)
- INSEE/Postal code: 2B227 /20234
- ^{1} French Land Register data, which excludes lakes, ponds, glaciers > 1 km^{2} (0.386 sq mi or 247 acres) and river estuaries.

Pietricaggio is a commune in the Haute-Corse department of France on the island of Corsica.

== Population ==
Historical population
Year	Pop.	±% p.a.
1968	124	—
1975	117	−0.83%
1982	100	−2.22%
1990	75	−3.53%
1999	54	−3.58%
2007	51	−0.71%
2012	36	−6.73%
2017	35	−0.56%
2023	32	−1.48%
Source: INSEE

== See also ==
- Communes of the Haute-Corse department
