= Perelli =

- Commune
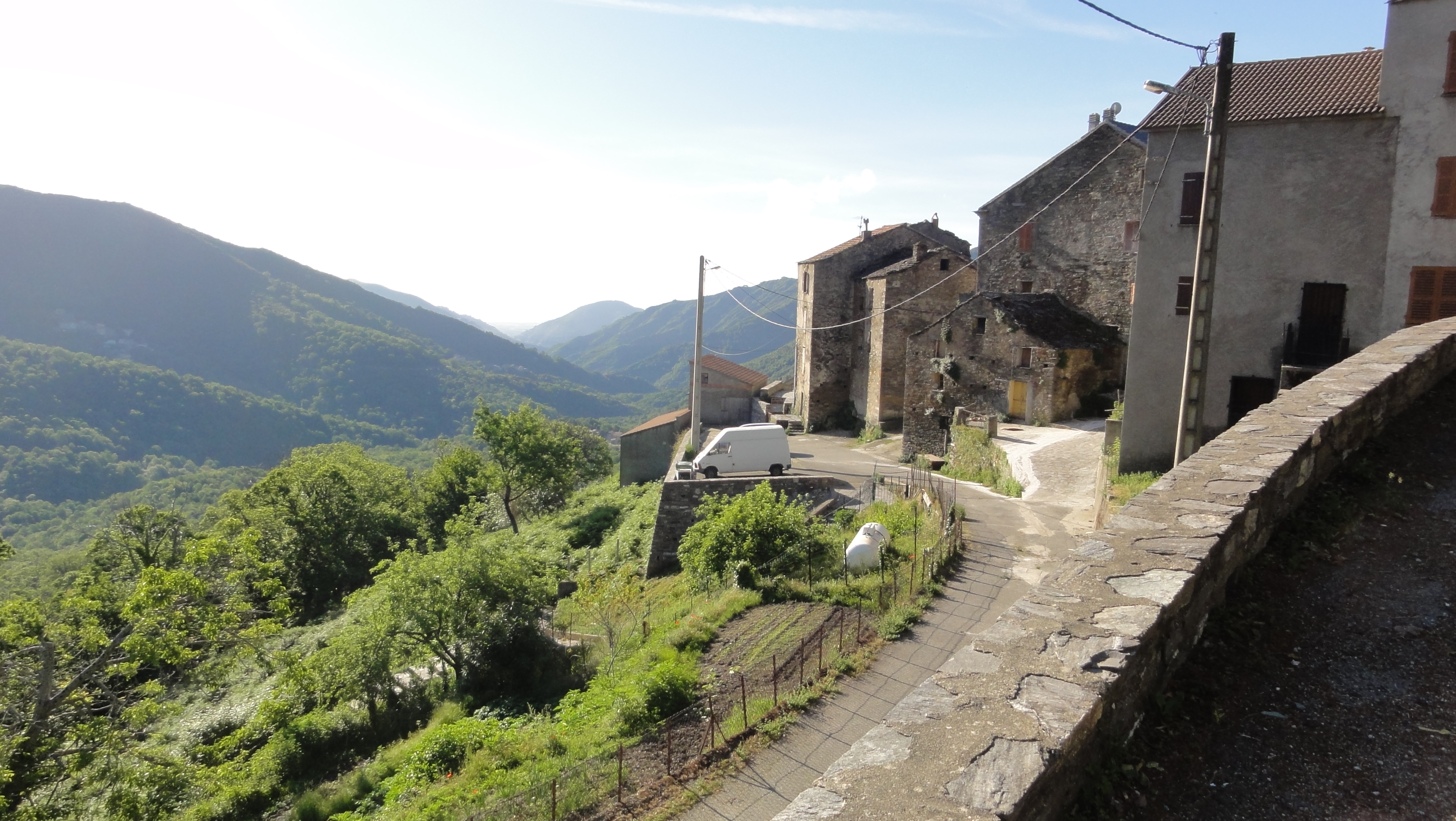
- Location of Perelli
- Location within France Location within Corsica
- Coordinates: 42°19′24″N 9°23′35″E
- Country: France
- Region: Corsica
- Department: Haute-Corse
- Arrondissement: Corte
- Canton: Castagniccia

Government
  - Mayor (2020–2026): Christiane Vinciguerra Cerami
- Area^{1}: 6.21 km^{2} (2.40 sq mi)
- Elevation: 700 m (2,300 ft)
- Highest elevation: 1,441 m (4,728 ft)
- Lowest elevation: 426 m (1,398 ft)
- Population (2023): 109
  - Density: 17.6/km^{2} (45.5/sq mi)
- Time zone: UTC+01:00 (CET)
  - Summer (DST): UTC+02:00 (CEST)
- INSEE/Postal code: 2B208 /20234
- ^{1} French Land Register data, which excludes lakes, ponds, glaciers > 1 km^{2} (0.386 sq mi or 247 acres) and river estuaries.

Perelli is a commune in the Haute-Corse department of France on the island of Corsica.

== Population ==
Historical population
Year	Pop.	±% p.a.
1968	158	—
1975	114	−4.56%
1982	100	−1.85%
1990	102	+0.25%
1999	110	+0.84%
2007	118	+0.88%
2012	112	−1.04%
2017	110	−0.36%
2023	109	−0.15%
Source: INSEE

== See also ==
- Communes of the Haute-Corse department
