= Valle-d'Alesani =

- Commune
- Location of Valle-d'Alesani
- Location within France Location within Corsica
- Coordinates: 42°19′38″N 9°24′57″E
- Country: France
- Region: Corsica
- Department: Haute-Corse
- Arrondissement: Corte
- Canton: Castagniccia

Government
  - Mayor (2020–2026): Jean-Claude Leenknegt
- Area^{1}: 9.59 km^{2} (3.70 sq mi)
- Elevation: 620 m (2,030 ft)
- Highest elevation: 1,056 m (3,465 ft)
- Lowest elevation: 271 m (889 ft)
- Population (2023): 124
  - Density: 12.9/km^{2} (33.5/sq mi)
- Time zone: UTC+01:00 (CET)
  - Summer (DST): UTC+02:00 (CEST)
- INSEE/Postal code: 2B334 /20234
- ^{1} French Land Register data, which excludes lakes, ponds, glaciers > 1 km^{2} (0.386 sq mi or 247 acres) and river estuaries.

Valle-d'Alesani (French pronunciation: [vale dalezani]) is a commune in the Haute-Corse department of France on the island of Corsica.

== Population ==
Historical population
| Year | Pop. | ±% p.a. |
|---|---|---|
| 1968 | 250 | — |
| 1975 | 213 | −2.26% |
| 1982 | 192 | −1.47% |
| 1990 | 142 | −3.70% |
| 1999 | 124 | −1.49% |
| 2007 | 143 | +1.80% |
| 2012 | 129 | −2.04% |
| 2017 | 109 | −3.31% |
| 2023 | 124 | +2.17% |
Source: INSEE

== See also ==
- Communes of the Haute-Corse department
