= San-Nicolao, Haute-Corse =

San Nicolao
- Commune
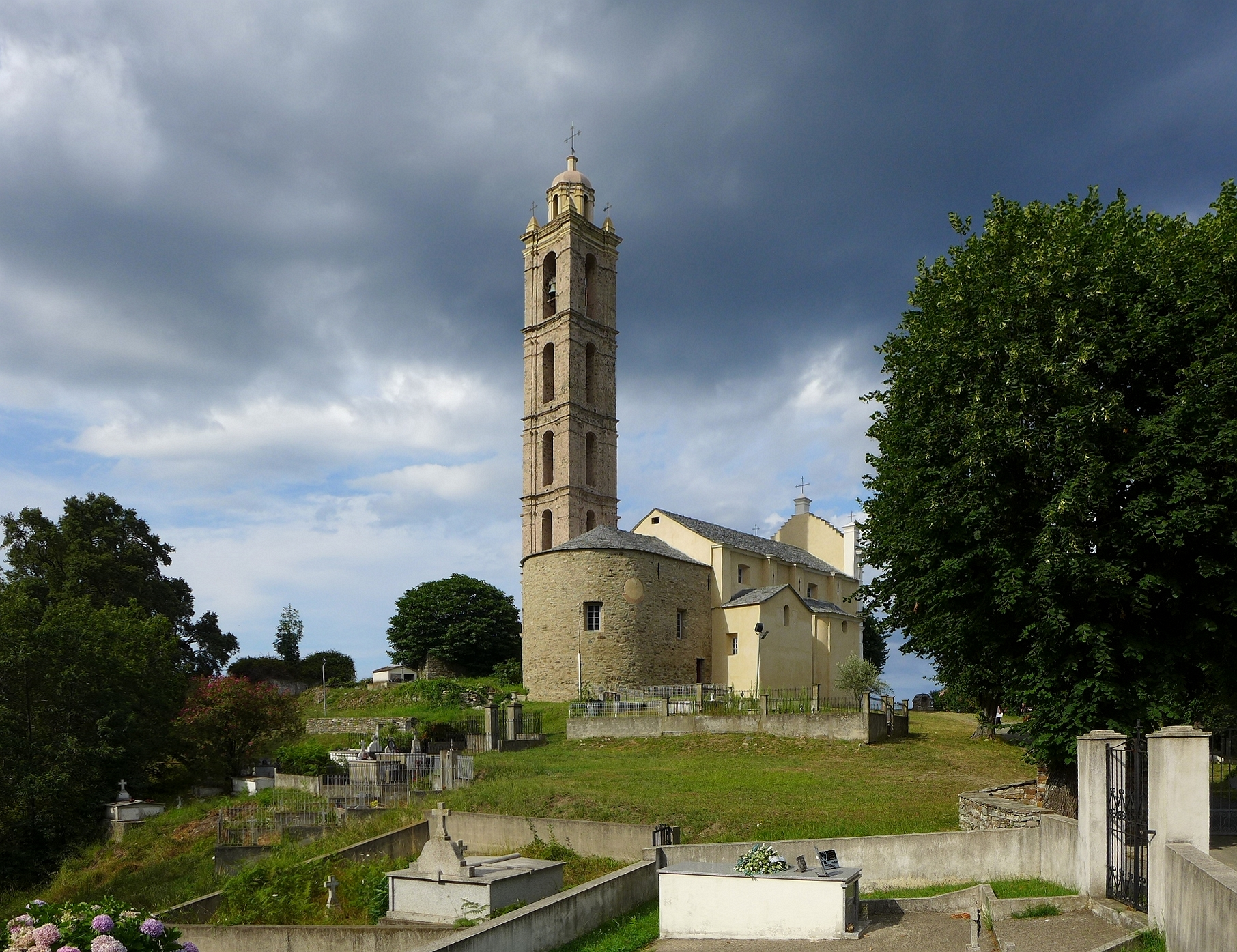
- The parish church of Saint-Nicolas
- Location of San Nicolao
- Location within France Location within Corsica
- Coordinates: 42°22′30″N 9°31′15″E
- Country: France
- Region: Corsica
- Department: Haute-Corse
- Arrondissement: Corte
- Canton: Castagniccia
- Intercommunality: Costa Verde

Government
  - Mayor (2020–2026): Marie-Thérèse Olivesi
- Area^{1}: 7.73 km^{2} (2.98 sq mi)
- Elevation: 250 m (820 ft)
- Highest elevation: 922 m (3,025 ft)
- Lowest elevation: 0 m (0 ft)
- Population (2023): 2,062
  - Density: 267/km^{2} (691/sq mi)
- Time zone: UTC+01:00 (CET)
  - Summer (DST): UTC+02:00 (CEST)
- INSEE/Postal code: 2B313 /20230
- ^{1} French Land Register data, which excludes lakes, ponds, glaciers > 1 km^{2} (0.386 sq mi or 247 acres) and river estuaries.

San-Nicolao (French form) or San Nicolao (Italian form; Corsican: San Niculaiu or San Niculau), is a commune in the Haute-Corse department, on the island of Corsica, France.

== Population ==
Historical population
| Year | Pop. | ±% p.a. |
|---|---|---|
| 1968 | 682 | — |
| 1975 | 731 | +1.00% |
| 1982 | 867 | +2.47% |
| 1990 | 1,061 | +2.56% |
| 1999 | 1,316 | +2.42% |
| 2007 | 1,518 | +1.80% |
| 2012 | 1,792 | +3.37% |
| 2017 | 1,987 | +2.09% |
| 2023 | 2,062 | +0.62% |
Source: INSEE

== Geography ==
San Nicolao is located in the east side of the island.

== See also ==
- Communes of the Haute-Corse department
