= Ortale =

- Commune
- Location of Ortale
- Location within France Location within Corsica
- Coordinates: 42°19′02″N 9°25′25″E
- Country: France
- Region: Corsica
- Department: Haute-Corse
- Arrondissement: Corte
- Canton: Castagniccia

Government
  - Mayor (2020–2026): Antoine Defendini
- Area^{1}: 4.06 km^{2} (1.57 sq mi)
- Elevation: 488 m (1,601 ft)
- Highest elevation: 853 m (2,799 ft)
- Lowest elevation: 176 m (577 ft)
- Population (2023): 25
  - Density: 6.2/km^{2} (16/sq mi)
- Time zone: UTC+01:00 (CET)
  - Summer (DST): UTC+02:00 (CEST)
- INSEE/Postal code: 2B194 /20234
- ^{1} French Land Register data, which excludes lakes, ponds, glaciers > 1 km^{2} (0.386 sq mi or 247 acres) and river estuaries.

Ortale (French pronunciation: [ɔʁ.tal]) is a commune in the Haute-Corse department of France on the island of Corsica.

== Population ==
Historical population
| Year | Pop. | ±% p.a. |
|---|---|---|
| 1968 | 84 | — |
| 1975 | 64 | −3.81% |
| 1982 | 55 | −2.14% |
| 1990 | 17 | −13.65% |
| 1999 | 25 | +4.38% |
| 2007 | 31 | +2.73% |
| 2012 | 26 | −3.46% |
| 2017 | 25 | −0.78% |
| 2023 | 25 | +0.00% |
Source: INSEE

== See also ==
- Communes of the Haute-Corse department
