= Sant'Andréa-di-Cotone =

- Commune
- Location of Sant'Andréa-di-Cotone
- Location within France Location within Corsica
- Coordinates: 42°18′51″N 9°28′48″E
- Country: France
- Region: Corsica
- Department: Haute-Corse
- Arrondissement: Corte
- Canton: Castagniccia
- Intercommunality: Costa Verde

Government
  - Mayor (2020–2026): Stéphane Domarchi
- Area^{1}: 8.91 km^{2} (3.44 sq mi)
- Elevation: 480 m (1,570 ft)
- Highest elevation: 1,046 m (3,432 ft)
- Lowest elevation: 56 m (184 ft)
- Population (2023): 193
  - Density: 21.7/km^{2} (56.1/sq mi)
- Time zone: UTC+01:00 (CET)
  - Summer (DST): UTC+02:00 (CEST)
- INSEE/Postal code: 2B293 /20221
- ^{1} French Land Register data, which excludes lakes, ponds, glaciers > 1 km^{2} (0.386 sq mi or 247 acres) and river estuaries.

Sant'Andréa-di-Cotone (French pronunciation: [sɑ̃t‿ɑ̃dʁea di kɔtɔn]) is a commune in the Haute-Corse department of France on the island of Corsica.

== Population ==
Historical population
Year	Pop.	±% p.a.
1968	209	—
1975	160	−3.74%
1982	127	−3.25%
1990	182	+4.60%
1999	167	−0.95%
2007	222	+3.62%
2012	240	+1.57%
2017	229	−0.93%
2023	193	−2.81%
Source: INSEE

== See also ==
- Communes of the Haute-Corse department
