= San-Giovanni-di-Moriani =

- Commune
- Location of San-Giovanni-di-Moriani
- Location within France Location within Corsica
- Coordinates: 42°22′31″N 9°28′44″E
- Country: France
- Region: Corsica
- Department: Haute-Corse
- Arrondissement: Corte
- Canton: Castagniccia
- Intercommunality: Costa Verde

Government
  - Mayor (2020–2026): Carine Franchi
- Area^{1}: 10.19 km^{2} (3.93 sq mi)
- Elevation: 560 m (1,840 ft)
- Highest elevation: 1,280 m (4,200 ft)
- Lowest elevation: 94 m (308 ft)
- Population (2023): 102
  - Density: 10.0/km^{2} (25.9/sq mi)
- Time zone: UTC+01:00 (CET)
  - Summer (DST): UTC+02:00 (CEST)
- INSEE/Postal code: 2B302 /20230
- ^{1} French Land Register data, which excludes lakes, ponds, glaciers > 1 km^{2} (0.386 sq mi or 247 acres) and river estuaries.

San-Giovanni-di-Moriani (French pronunciation: [sɑ̃ ʒjɔvani di mɔʁjani]) is a commune in the Haute-Corse department of France on the island of Corsica.

== Population ==
Historical population
Year	Pop.	±% p.a.
1968	157	—
1975	112	−4.71%
1982	75	−5.57%
1990	73	−0.34%
1999	85	+1.71%
2007	104	+2.55%
2012	91	−2.64%
2017	94	+0.65%
2023	102	+1.37%
Source: INSEE

== See also ==
- Communes of the Haute-Corse department
