= Santa-Reparata-di-Moriani =

- Commune
- Location of Santa-Reparata-di-Moriani
- Location within France Location within Corsica
- Coordinates: 42°21′14″N 9°27′26″E
- Country: France
- Region: Corsica
- Department: Haute-Corse
- Arrondissement: Corte
- Canton: Castagniccia
- Intercommunality: Costa Verde

Government
  - Mayor (2020–2026): Paul Pascal Silvagnoli
- Area^{1}: 9.12 km^{2} (3.52 sq mi)
- Elevation: 625 m (2,051 ft)
- Highest elevation: 1,280 m (4,200 ft)
- Lowest elevation: 489 m (1,604 ft)
- Population (2023): 52
  - Density: 5.7/km^{2} (15/sq mi)
- Time zone: UTC+01:00 (CET)
  - Summer (DST): UTC+02:00 (CEST)
- INSEE/Postal code: 2B317 /20230
- ^{1} French Land Register data, which excludes lakes, ponds, glaciers > 1 km^{2} (0.386 sq mi or 247 acres) and river estuaries.

Santa-Reparata-di-Moriani (French pronunciation: [sɑ̃ta ʁ(ə)paʁata d(i) mɔʁjani]) is a commune in the Haute-Corse department of France on the island of Corsica.

== Population ==
Historical population
Year	Pop.	±% p.a.
1968	130	—
1975	83	−6.21%
1982	51	−6.72%
1990	37	−3.93%
1999	43	+1.68%
2007	46	+0.85%
2012	44	−0.89%
2017	54	+4.18%
2023	52	−0.63%
Source: INSEE

== See also ==
- Communes of the Haute-Corse department
