= Golo (river) =

River in the department of Haute-Corse, Corsica

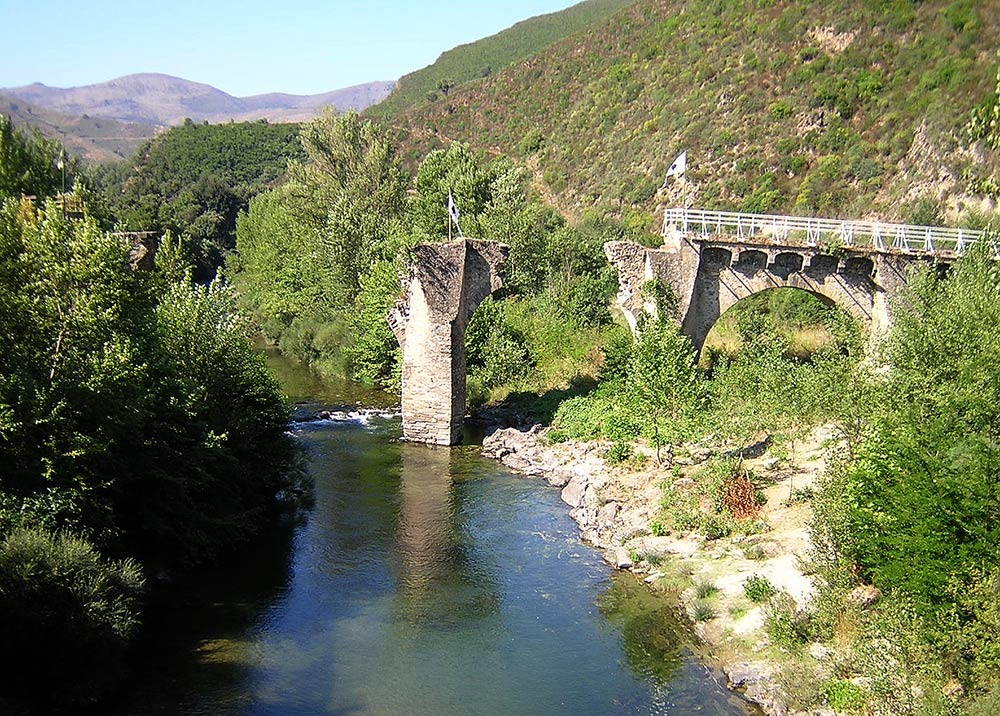
- old Golo bridge near Castello-di-Rostino

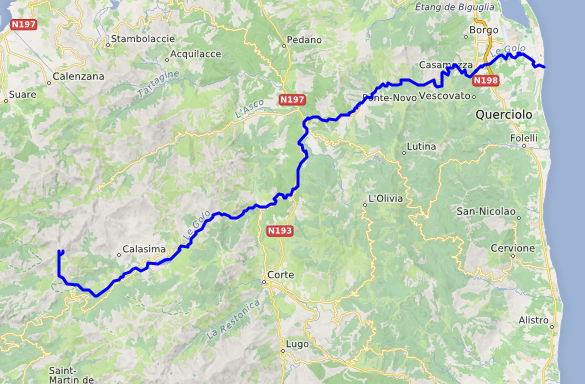

Location
- Country: France

Physical characteristics
- Source
  - location: central Corsica
- Mouth
  - location: Tyrrhenian Sea
  - coordinates: 42°31′23″N 9°32′5″E
- Length: 89.4 km (55.6 mi)

The Golo (French pronunciation: [ɡɔlo]; Corsican: Golu) is the longest river on the island of Corsica, France, at 89.4 kilometres (55.6 mi)

== Course ==
The Golo is 89.38 kilometres (55.54 mi) long. It crosses the communes of Aiti, Albertacce, Bigorno, Bisinchi, Calacuccia, Campile, Campitello, Canavaggia, Casamaccioli, Castello-di-Rostino, Castirla, Corscia, Gavignano, Lento, Lucciana, Monte, Morosaglia, Olmo, Omessa, Piedigriggio, Prato-di-Giovellina, Prunelli-di-Casacconi, Saliceto, Valle-di-Rostino, Venzolasca, Vescovato, Vignale and Volpajola.

The Golo's source is in the mountainous middle of the island, south of Monte Cinto. It flows generally northeast, through Calacuccia and Ponte-Leccia, and ends in the Tyrrhenian Sea approximately 20 kilometres (12 mi) south of Bastia, near the Bastia – Poretta Airport. Its entire course is in the Haute-Corse département. The river is dammed at Calacuccia to form the Lac de Calacuccia, a hydroelectric reservoir.

== Hydrology ==
Measurements of the river flow were taken at the Volpajola [Barchetta] station from 1961 to 2021. The watershed above this station covers 926 square kilometres (358 sq mi). Annual precipitation was calculated as 506 millimetres (19.9 in). The average flow of water throughout the year was 14.8 cubic metres per second (520 cu ft/s).

Average flow (cubic meters per second) by month for the period 1961 to 2021
Month	Flow
Jan	20.60
Feb	21.60
Mar	24.90
Apr	25.10
May	20.20
Jun	8.350
Jul	3.340
Aug	2.720
Sep	3.960
Oct	8.510
Nov	17.20
Dec	21.80

== Tributaries ==
The following streams (ruisseaux) are tributaries of the Golo, ordered by length:

- Asco 34 kilometres (21 mi)
- Casaluna 25 kilometres (16 mi)
- Bornalinco 12 kilometres (7.5 mi)
- Erco 11 kilometres (6.8 mi)
- Viru 10 kilometres (6.2 mi)
- Canavaghiola 9 kilometres (5.6 mi)
- Sumano 8 kilometres (5.0 mi)
- Vadone 8 kilometres (5.0 mi)
- Casacconi 7 kilometres (4.3 mi)
- Ruda 7 kilometres (4.3 mi)
- Acqua Fredda 6 kilometres (3.7 mi)
- Casa Murella 6 kilometres (3.7 mi)
- Ruggi 6 kilometres (3.7 mi)
- Pedicinque 6 kilometres (3.7 mi)
- Sanguinelli 6 kilometres (3.7 mi)
- Fosse de Ciavattone 6 kilometres (3.7 mi)
- Frascaghiu 5 kilometres (3.1 mi)
- Pruniccia 5 kilometres (3.1 mi)
- Petra Laccia 5 kilometres (3.1 mi)
- Novella 5 kilometres (3.1 mi)
- Pinzalone 5 kilometres (3.1 mi)
- Volta 5 kilometres (3.1 mi)
- Colga 5 kilometres (3.1 mi)
- Furignone 4 kilometres (2.5 mi)
- Stretto 4 kilometres (2.5 mi)
- Puretello 4 kilometres (2.5 mi)
- Forcione 4 kilometres (2.5 mi)
- Chiarasgiu 4 kilometres (2.5 mi)
- Arenucciu 4 kilometres (2.5 mi)
- Fiuminale 4 kilometres (2.5 mi)
- Vergalellu 4 kilometres (2.5 mi)
- Coticcio 4 kilometres (2.5 mi)
- l'Oia 4 kilometres (2.5 mi)
- Noceto 4 kilometres (2.5 mi)
- Ruisseau du Castellu 3 kilometres (1.9 mi)
- Falconaia 3 kilometres (1.9 mi)
- Sughilia 3 kilometres (1.9 mi)
- Lavertacce 3 kilometres (1.9 mi)
- Vergalone 3 kilometres (1.9 mi)
- Campo Piano 3 kilometres (1.9 mi)
- Ravin de Teghiamara 3 kilometres (1.9 mi)
- Corniolo 3 kilometres (1.9 mi)
- Maltempu 3 kilometres (1.9 mi)
- Buffardu 3 kilometres (1.9 mi)
- Canneto 3 kilometres (1.9 mi)
- Murato 3 kilometres (1.9 mi)
- Sualello 3 kilometres (1.9 mi)
- Catamalzi 3 kilometres (1.9 mi)
- Padule 3 kilometres (1.9 mi)
- Mazzone 2 kilometres (1.2 mi)
- Valde Calze 2 kilometres (1.2 mi)
- Volte 2 kilometres (1.2 mi)
- Cipetto 2 kilometres (1.2 mi)
- Catarette et de Lagiarone 2 kilometres (1.2 mi)
- Silvagnolo 2 kilometres (1.2 mi)
- Ciattarinu 2 kilometres (1.2 mi)
- Alzitana 2 kilometres (1.2 mi)
- Monticello 2 kilometres (1.2 mi)
- Balliccione 2 kilometres (1.2 mi)
- Curtinche 2 kilometres (1.2 mi)
- Mulinellu 2 kilometres (1.2 mi)
- Valliccone 2 kilometres (1.2 mi)
- Finosella 2 kilometres (1.2 mi)
- Scopette 2 kilometres (1.2 mi)
- Alzetu 2 kilometres (1.2 mi)
- Cruma 2 kilometres (1.2 mi)
- Fornello 2 kilometres (1.2 mi)
- Poggie 2 kilometres (1.2 mi)
- Piedilorso 2 kilometres (1.2 mi)
- la Via Secca 2 kilometres (1.2 mi)
- Tornaroio 2 kilometres (1.2 mi)
- Ficaiola 2 kilometres (1.2 mi)
- Novella 2 kilometres (1.2 mi)
- Becchittacci 2 kilometres (1.2 mi)
- Sialari 2 kilometres (1.2 mi)
- Quercitane 2 kilometres (1.2 mi)
- Falconaia 1 kilometre (0.62 mi)
- Vetrice 1 kilometre (0.62 mi)
- Mitalle 1 kilometre (0.62 mi)
- Favale 1 kilometre (0.62 mi)
- Zuffello 1 kilometre (0.62 mi)
- Funtana Secca 1 kilometre (0.62 mi)
- Paratella 1 kilometre (0.62 mi)
- l'Ortone 1 kilometre (0.62 mi)
- Funtana Secca 1 kilometre (0.62 mi)
- Cannella 1 kilometre (0.62 mi)
- Piubbiche 1 kilometre (0.62 mi)
- Favalello 1 kilometre (0.62 mi)
- Chiarasgioli 1 kilometre (0.62 mi)
- Casella 1 kilometre (0.62 mi)

== Sources ==
- "Le Golo à Volpajola [Barchetta]", eaufrance (in French), Ministère de l'Ecologie, du Développement Durable et de l'Energie, archived from the original on 2011-03-01
- "Le Golo", Sandre (in French)
- "Relation: Le Golo (2805254)", OpenStreetMap
- "Retenue de Calacuccia", Sandre (in French)
