= Penta-Acquatella =

Penta-Acquatella A Penta Acquatella
- Commune
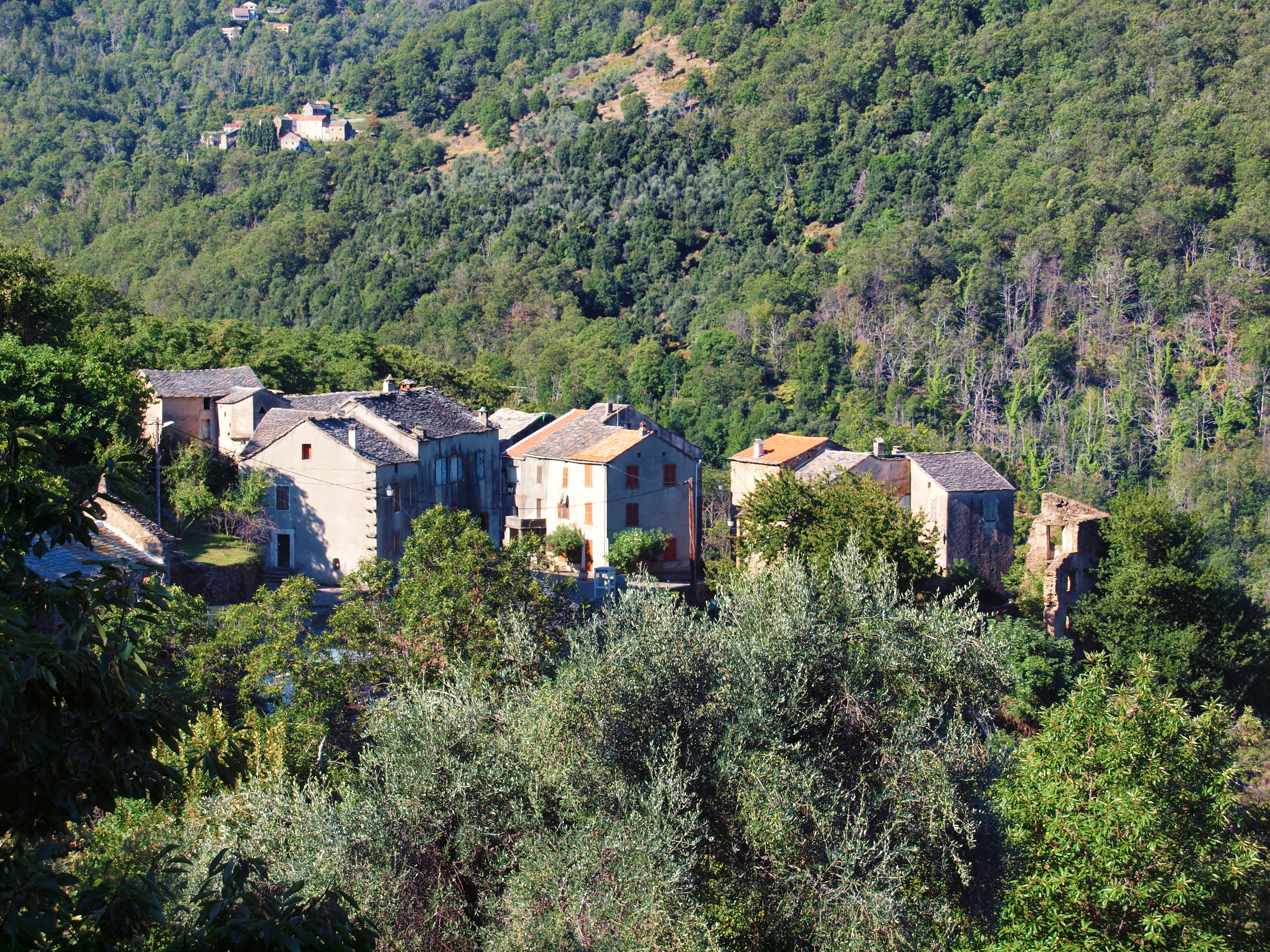
- The village of Acquatella, in Penta-Acquatella
- Location of Penta-Acquatella
- Location within France Location within Corsica
- Coordinates: 42°27′46″N 9°21′47″E
- Country: France
- Region: Corsica
- Department: Haute-Corse
- Arrondissement: Corte
- Canton: Golo-Morosaglia

Government
  - Mayor (2020–2026): René Gattacceca
- Area^{1}: 3.1 km^{2} (1.2 sq mi)
- Elevation: 460 m (1,510 ft)
- Highest elevation: 920 m (3,020 ft)
- Lowest elevation: 237 m (778 ft)
- Population (2023): 41
  - Density: 13/km^{2} (34/sq mi)
- Time zone: UTC+01:00 (CET)
  - Summer (DST): UTC+02:00 (CEST)
- INSEE/Postal code: 2B206 /20290
- ^{1} French Land Register data, which excludes lakes, ponds, glaciers > 1 km^{2} (0.386 sq mi or 247 acres) and river estuaries.

Penta-Acquatella is a commune in the Haute-Corse department of France on the island of Corsica.

It is part of the canton of Golo-Morosaglia.

== Geography ==
Penta Acquatella lies south of the river Golo in the Castagniccia, 29 kilometres (18 mi) south-southeast of Campitello. Penta-Acquatella is a commune in the interior of the island, located in Castagniccia, in the ancient pieve of Casacconi, bordering the Castagniccia “territory of life” at the northern end of the Corsica regional natural park. It is part of the “little Castagniccia”, a microregion with a high human density in the past.

== Population ==
Historical population
Year	Pop.	±% p.a.
1968	112	—
1975	71	−6.30%
1982	53	−4.09%
1990	37	−4.39%
1999	40	+0.87%
2007	42	+0.61%
2012	36	−3.04%
2017	34	−1.14%
2023	41	+3.17%
Source: INSEE

== See also ==
- Communes of the Haute-Corse department
