= Alando =

Alando may refer to:

- Alando, Haute-Corse, a commune in the Haute-Corse department in France
- Alando Terrelonge, Jamaican politician and government minister
- Alando Tucker (b. 1984), an American professional basketball player
- Alando Soakai (b. 1983), a New Zealand Rugby Union player
- Alando (company), an auction house company based in Germany
- Alando Walter, Kenyan Urban Planner and Geoinformation Science expert
