= Erco (river) =

River in France

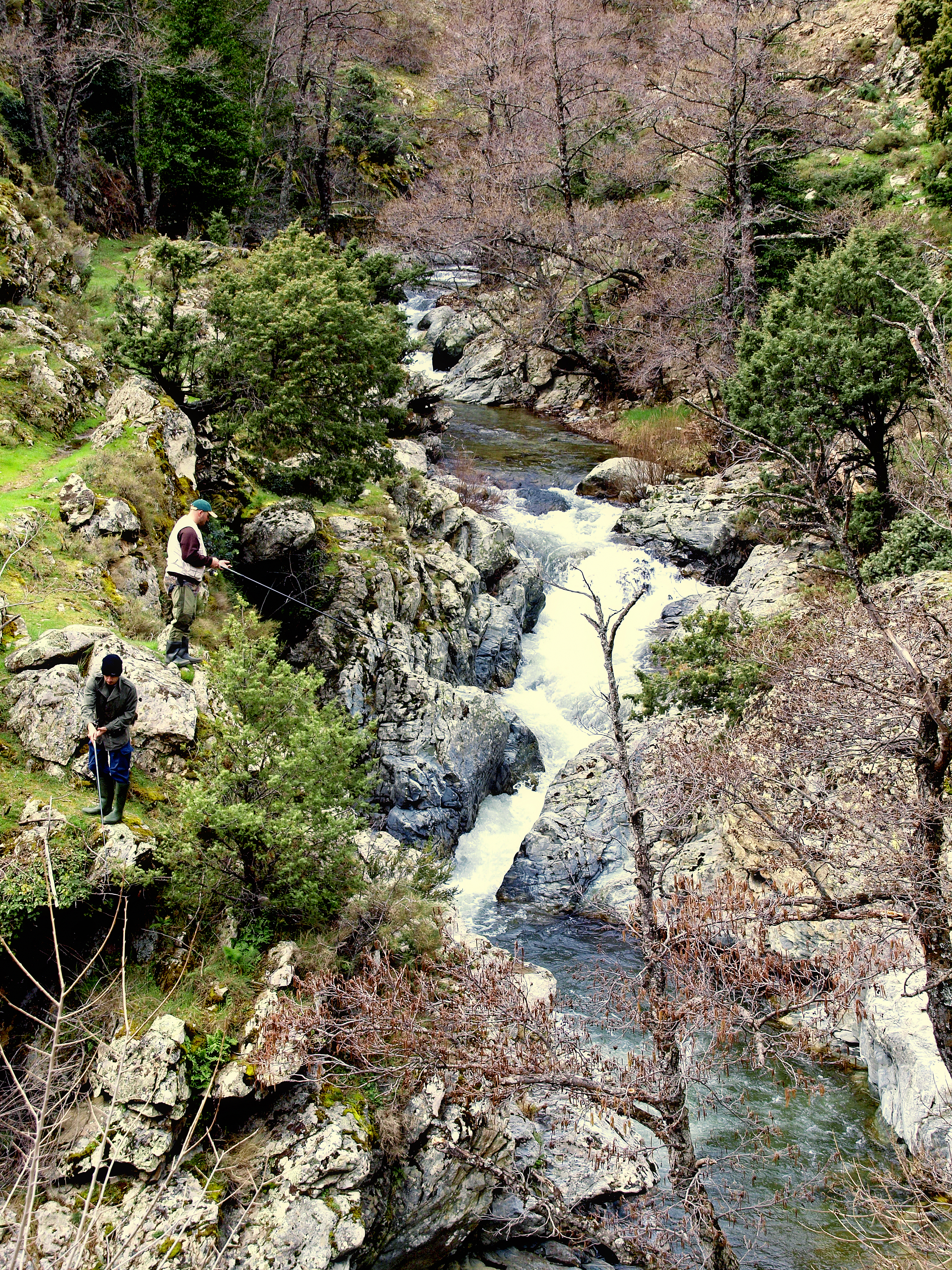
- Fishing for trout in the Erco

- Location within Corsica Location within France
- Native name: Ercu (Corsican)

Location
- Country: France
- Region: Corsica
- Department: Haute-Corse

Physical characteristics
- Mouth: Golo
  - coordinates: 42.3422°N 9.0367°E

Basin features
- Progression: Golo→ Tyrrhenian Sea

The Erco (Corsican: Ercu) is a stream in the department of Haute-Corse, Corsica, France. It is a tributary of the Golo.

== Course ==
The Erco is 11.18 kilometres (6.95 mi) long. It crosses the communes of Calacuccia, Corscia and Lozzi. The stream originates in the commune of Lozzi to the south of the 2,706 metres (8,878 ft) Monte Cinto. It flows in a generally southeast direction to its confluence with the Golo between Calacuccia and Corscia. The D84 road crosses the Erco just above its mouth, but otherwise there are no roads along its course.

== Hydrology ==
Measurements of the stream flow were taken at the Calacuccia [Cuccia] station from 1979 to 1993. The watershed above this station covers 23 square kilometres (8.9 sq mi). Annual precipitation was calculated as 1,117 millimetres (44.0 in). The average flow of water throughout the year was 0.813 cubic metres per second (28.7 cu ft/s).

Average flow (cubic meters per second) by month for the period 1979 to 1993
Month	Flow
Jan	0.642
Feb	0.657
Mar	1.020
Apr	1.620
May	1.630
Jun	0.767
Jul	0.182
Aug	0.067
Sep	0.180
Oct	0.855
Nov	1.020
Dec	1.120

== Tributaries ==
The following streams (ruisseaux) are tributaries of the Erco:

- Forcu Ario 3 km (1.9 mi)
- Cappiaghia 3 km (1.9 mi)
- Pulella 2 km (1.2 mi)
- Tileri 2 km (1.2 mi)
- Travizzolu 2 km (1.2 mi)
- Forcioli 2 km (1.2 mi)
- Monte Cinto 2 km (1.2 mi)
- Osu 1 km (0.62 mi)
- Alzi Mozzi 1 km (0.62 mi)

== Sources ==
- "L'Erco à Calacuccia [Cuccia]", eaufrance (in French), Ministère de l'Ecologie, du Développement Durable et de l'Energie
- "Relation: Ruisseau d'Erco (9104309)", OpenStreetMap
- "Ruisseau d'Erco", Sandre (in French)
