= Saliceto =

Saliceto may refer to:

William of Saliceto also known as Guilielmus de Saliceto

== Places ==
France

- Saliceto, Haute-Corse, a commune in Corsica

Italy

- Saliceto, Piedmont, a comune in the province of Cuneo
