= Ortiporio =

Ortiporio Ortiporiu
- Commune
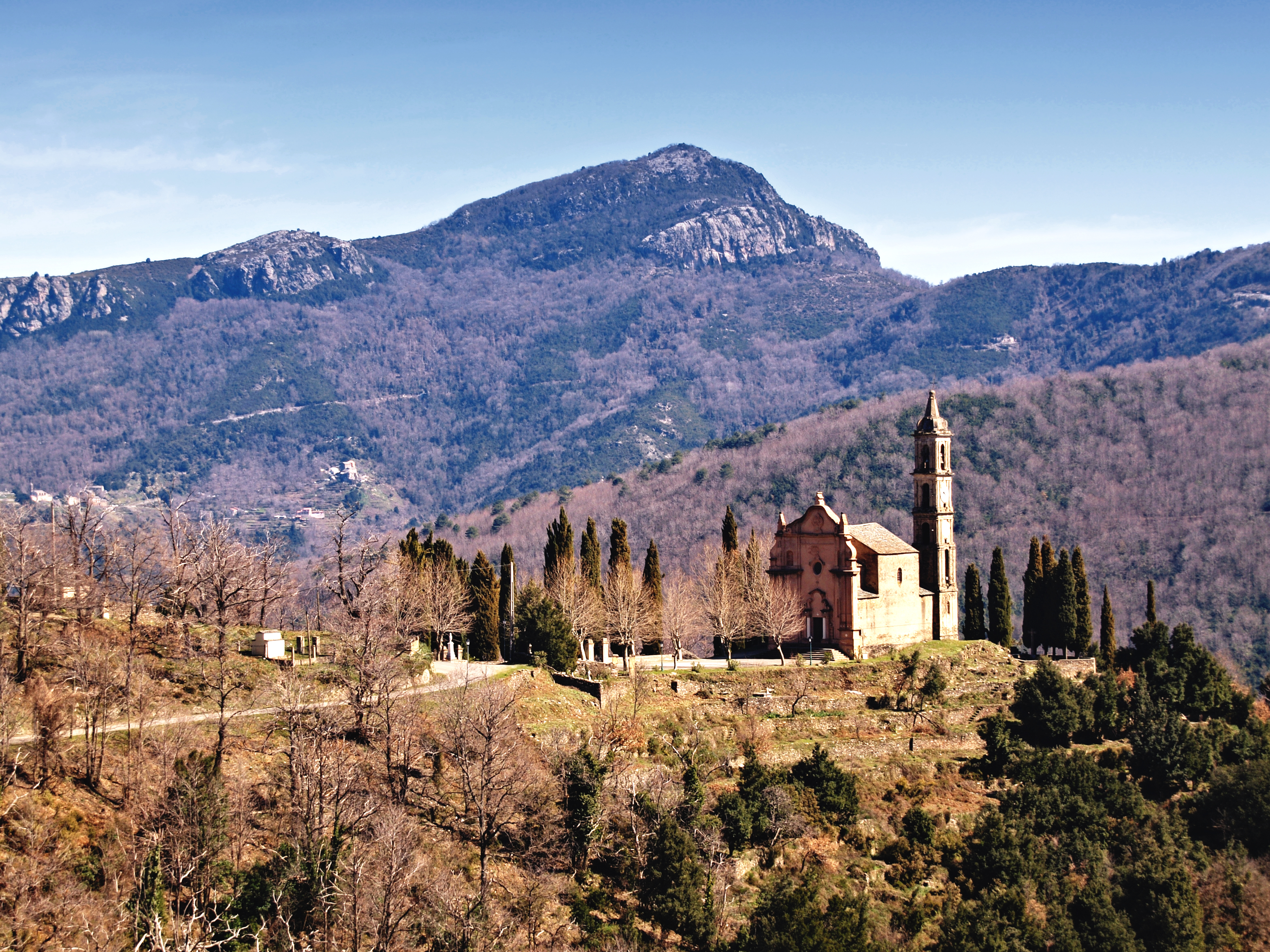
- A view of the church of Saint-Augustin and the Monte Sant'Angelo
- Location of Ortiporio
- Location within France Location within Corsica
- Coordinates: 42°27′21″N 9°20′33″E
- Country: France
- Region: Corsica
- Department: Haute-Corse
- Arrondissement: Corte
- Canton: Golo-Morosaglia

Government
  - Mayor (2020–2026): Pascal Sarti
- Area^{1}: 5 km^{2} (1.9 sq mi)
- Elevation: 700 m (2,300 ft)
- Highest elevation: 1,236 m (4,055 ft)
- Lowest elevation: 313 m (1,027 ft)
- Population (2023): 139
  - Density: 28/km^{2} (72/sq mi)
- Time zone: UTC+01:00 (CET)
  - Summer (DST): UTC+02:00 (CEST)
- INSEE/Postal code: 2B195 /20290
- Website: ortiporio.fr
- ^{1} French Land Register data, which excludes lakes, ponds, glaciers > 1 km^{2} (0.386 sq mi or 247 acres) and river estuaries.

Ortiporio (French pronunciation: [ɔʁtipɔʁjo]; Corsican: Ortiporiu) is a commune in the Haute-Corse department of France on the island of Corsica.

It is part of the canton of Golo-Morosaglia.

== Geography ==
Ortiporio is 24 kilometres (15 mi) to the south of Campitello at the foot of Mont Campuli, which is 1,236 metres (4,055 ft).

== Population ==
Historical population
Year	Pop.	±% p.a.
1968	167	—
1975	119	−4.73%
1982	100	−2.45%
1990	104	+0.49%
1999	113	+0.93%
2007	124	+1.17%
2012	131	+1.10%
2017	127	−0.62%
2023	139	+1.52%
Source: INSEE

== History ==
1934 - Night of 3 to 4 February : an avalanche caused the death of 37 persons. The snow level exceeded 1.50 m by place. A stele, in the church Saint-Augustine, reminds of this tragic disaster.

== See also ==
- Communes of the Haute-Corse department
