= Alzi =

- Commune
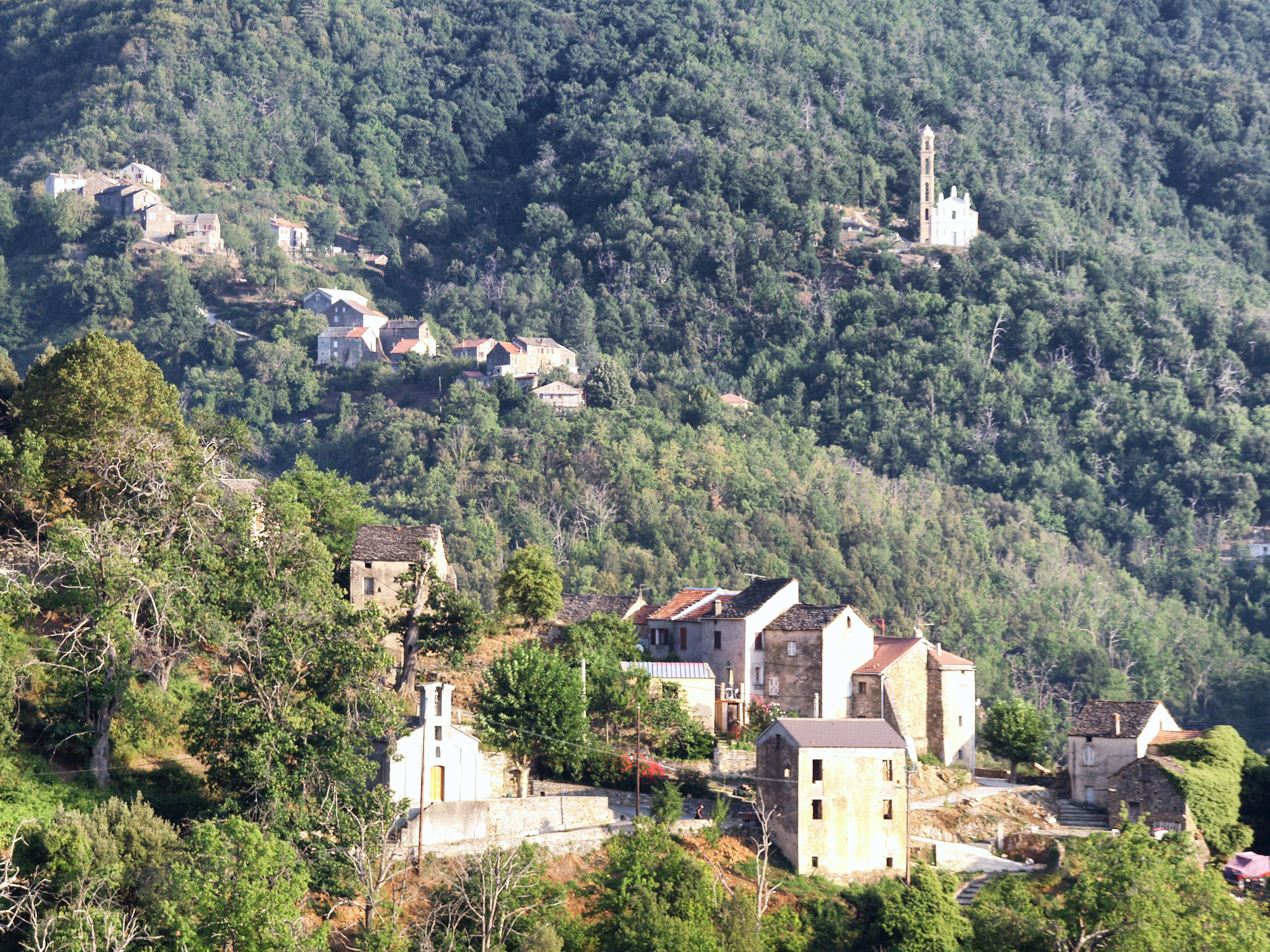
- Alzi village
- Location of Alzi
- Location within France Location within Corsica
- Coordinates: 42°18′15″N 9°18′09″E
- Country: France
- Region: Corsica
- Department: Haute-Corse
- Arrondissement: Corte
- Canton: Golo-Morosaglia

Government
  - Mayor (2020–2026): Simon Venturini
- Area^{1}: 2.74 km^{2} (1.06 sq mi)
- Elevation: 736 m (2,415 ft)
- Highest elevation: 1,616 m (5,302 ft)
- Lowest elevation: 577 m (1,893 ft)
- Population (2023): 27
  - Density: 9.9/km^{2} (26/sq mi)
- Time zone: UTC+01:00 (CET)
  - Summer (DST): UTC+02:00 (CEST)
- INSEE/Postal code: 2B013 /20240
- ^{1} French Land Register data, which excludes lakes, ponds, glaciers > 1 km^{2} (0.386 sq mi or 247 acres) and river estuaries.

Alzi is a commune in the Haute-Corse department of France on the island of Corsica.

== Population ==
Historical population
Year	Pop.	±% p.a.
1968	39	—
1975	24	−6.70%
1982	17	−4.81%
1990	11	−5.30%
1999	17	+4.96%
2007	15	−1.55%
2012	18	+3.71%
2017	26	+7.63%
2023	27	+0.63%
Source: INSEE

== Personalities ==
- François Marcantoni (1920-2010), member of the French resistance and then involved in the Corsican mafia

== See also ==
- Communes of the Haute-Corse department
