= Castiglione, Haute-Corse =

Castiglione Castiglioni (Corsican)
- Commune
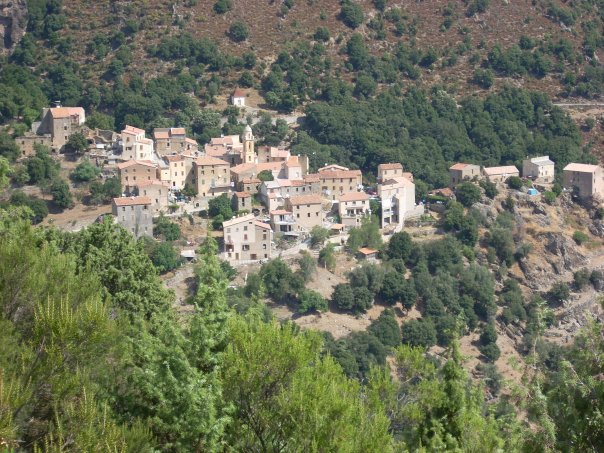
- A general view of Castiglione
- Location of Castiglione
- Location within France Location within Corsica
- Coordinates: 42°25′07″N 9°07′45″E
- Country: France
- Region: Corsica
- Department: Haute-Corse
- Arrondissement: Corte
- Canton: Golo-Morosaglia
- Intercommunality: Pasquale Paoli

Government
  - Mayor (2020–2026): Jean-Marcel Bertini
- Area^{1}: 23.17 km^{2} (8.95 sq mi)
- Elevation: 600 m (2,000 ft)
- Highest elevation: 2,160 m (7,090 ft)
- Lowest elevation: 360 m (1,180 ft)
- Population (2023): 40
  - Density: 1.7/km^{2} (4.5/sq mi)
- Time zone: UTC+01:00 (CET)
  - Summer (DST): UTC+02:00 (CEST)
- INSEE/Postal code: 2B081 /20218
- ^{1} French Land Register data, which excludes lakes, ponds, glaciers > 1 km^{2} (0.386 sq mi or 247 acres) and river estuaries.

Castiglione (Corsican: Castiglioni) is a commune in the Haute-Corse department of France on the island of Corsica.

== Population ==
Historical population
Year	Pop.	±% p.a.
1968	78	—
1975	67	−2.15%
1982	48	−4.65%
1990	22	−9.29%
1999	25	+1.43%
2007	33	+3.53%
2012	37	+2.31%
2017	42	+2.57%
2023	40	−0.81%
Source: INSEE

== See also ==
- Communes of the Haute-Corse department
