= Scolca =

Scolca Scolca
- Commune
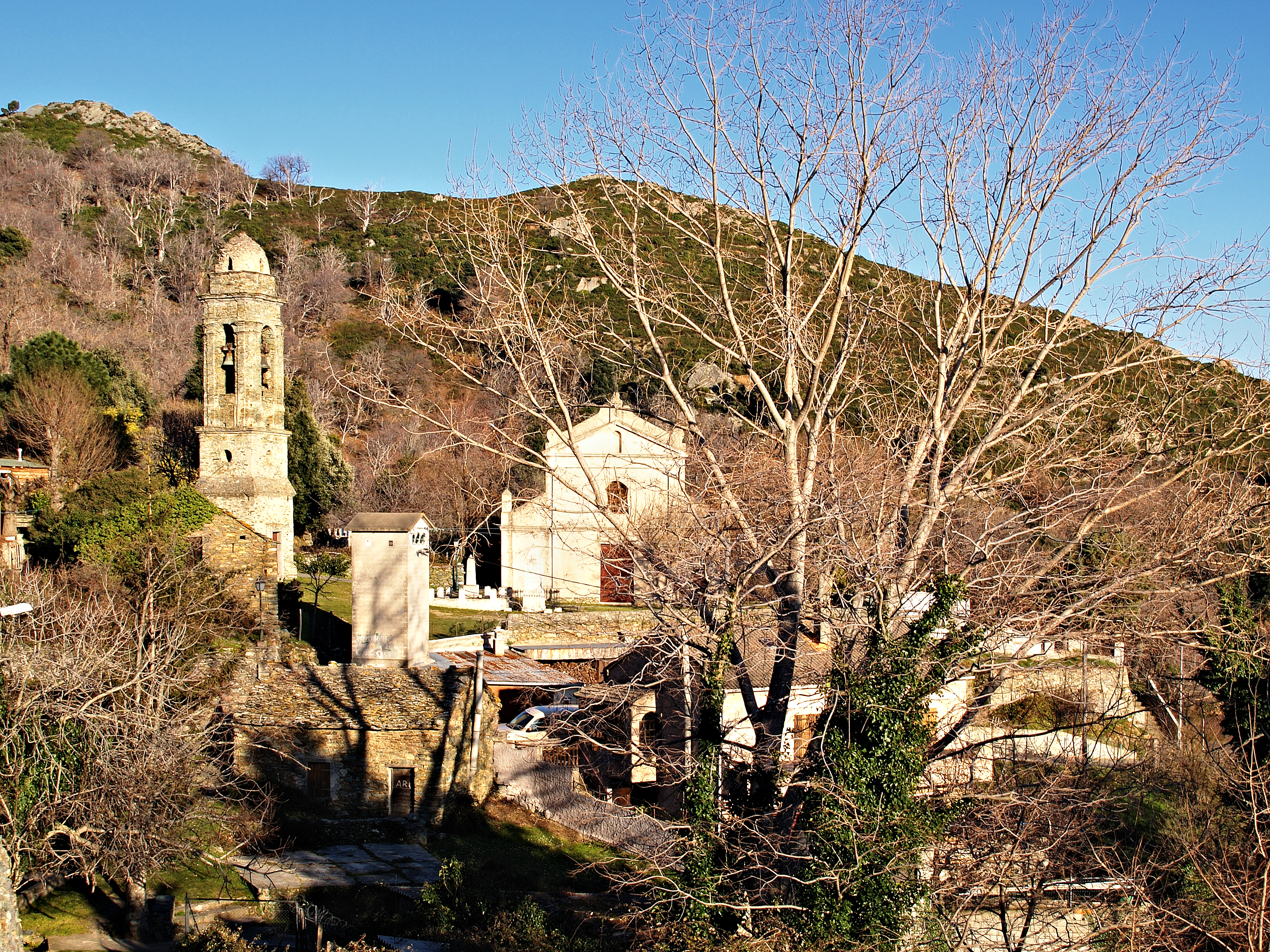
- The church of San Mamilianu and the surrounding buildings, in Scolca
- Location of Scolca
- Location within France Location within Corsica
- Coordinates: 42°31′46″N 9°21′45″E
- Country: France
- Region: Corsica
- Department: Haute-Corse
- Arrondissement: Corte
- Canton: Golo-Morosaglia

Government
  - Mayor (2020–2026): Jean-Marc Mattei
- Area^{1}: 6.9 km^{2} (2.7 sq mi)
- Elevation: 580 m (1,900 ft)
- Highest elevation: 1,234 m (4,049 ft)
- Lowest elevation: 231 m (758 ft)
- Population (2023): 92
  - Density: 13/km^{2} (35/sq mi)
- Time zone: UTC+01:00 (CET)
  - Summer (DST): UTC+02:00 (CEST)
- INSEE/Postal code: 2B274 /20290
- ^{1} French Land Register data, which excludes lakes, ponds, glaciers > 1 km^{2} (0.386 sq mi or 247 acres) and river estuaries.

Scolca (French pronunciation: [skɔlka]; Corsican: A Scolca) is a commune in the Haute-Corse department of France on the island of Corsica.

It is part of the canton of Golo-Morosaglia.

== Geography ==
Scolca is at the eastern extremity of the canton of Alto-di-Casaconi in the north of Castagniccia, 11 kilometres (7 mi) west southwest of Borgo.

== Population ==
Historical population
Year	Pop.	±% p.a.
1968	77	—
1975	68	−1.76%
1982	56	−2.74%
1990	35	−5.71%
1999	62	+6.56%
2007	101	+6.29%
2012	106	+0.97%
2017	101	−0.96%
2023	92	−1.54%
Source: INSEE

== See also ==
- Communes of the Haute-Corse department
