= Érone =

- Commune
- Location of Érone
- Location within France Location within Corsica
- Coordinates: 42°22′24″N 9°16′16″E
- Country: France
- Region: Corsica
- Department: Haute-Corse
- Arrondissement: Corte
- Canton: Golo-Morosaglia
- Intercommunality: Pasquale Paoli

Government
  - Mayor (2020–2026): Stéphane Gillet-Vittori
- Area^{1}: 3.89 km^{2} (1.50 sq mi)
- Elevation: 780 m (2,560 ft)
- Highest elevation: 982 m (3,222 ft)
- Lowest elevation: 429 m (1,407 ft)
- Population (2023): 9
  - Density: 2.3/km^{2} (6.0/sq mi)
- Time zone: UTC+01:00 (CET)
  - Summer (DST): UTC+02:00 (CEST)
- INSEE/Postal code: 2B106 /20244
- ^{1} French Land Register data, which excludes lakes, ponds, glaciers > 1 km^{2} (0.386 sq mi or 247 acres) and river estuaries.

Érone (French pronunciation: [eʁɔn]) is a commune in the Haute-Corse department of France on the island of Corsica.

== Population ==
Historical population
Year	Pop.	±% p.a.
1968	32	—
1975	27	−2.40%
1982	23	−2.26%
1990	9	−11.07%
1999	8	−1.30%
2007	6	−3.53%
2012	9	+8.45%
2017	11	+4.10%
2023	9	−3.29%
Source: INSEE

== See also ==
- Communes of the Haute-Corse department
