= Mazzola =

- Commune
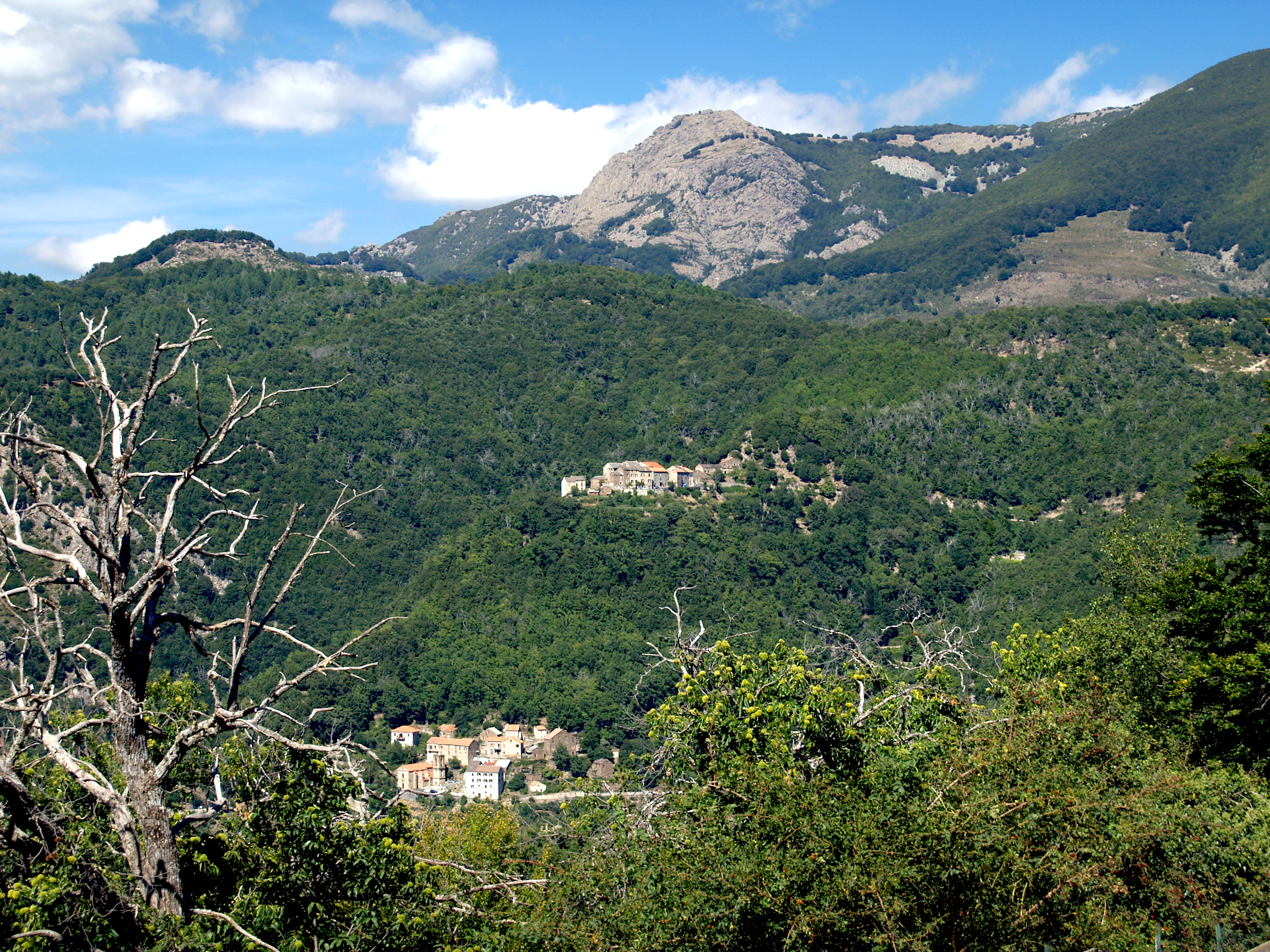
- A view of Mazzola and Castelluccio
- Location of Mazzola
- Location within France Location within Corsica
- Coordinates: 42°18′05″N 9°18′40″E
- Country: France
- Region: Corsica
- Department: Haute-Corse
- Arrondissement: Corte
- Canton: Golo-Morosaglia

Government
  - Mayor (2020–2026): Michel Ciattoni
- Area^{1}: 6.59 km^{2} (2.54 sq mi)
- Elevation: 800 m (2,600 ft)
- Highest elevation: 1,692 m (5,551 ft)
- Lowest elevation: 673 m (2,208 ft)
- Population (2023): 22
  - Density: 3.3/km^{2} (8.6/sq mi)
- Time zone: UTC+01:00 (CET)
  - Summer (DST): UTC+02:00 (CEST)
- INSEE/Postal code: 2B157 /20250
- ^{1} French Land Register data, which excludes lakes, ponds, glaciers > 1 km^{2} (0.386 sq mi or 247 acres) and river estuaries.

Mazzola is a commune in the Haute-Corse department of France on the island of Corsica.

== Population ==
Historical population
Year	Pop.	±% p.a.
1968	61	—
1975	49	−3.08%
1982	36	−4.31%
1990	27	−3.53%
1999	22	−2.25%
2007	25	+1.61%
2012	26	+0.79%
2017	28	+1.49%
2023	22	−3.94%
Source: INSEE

== See also ==
- Communes of the Haute-Corse department
