= Bigorno =

Bigorno Bigornu
- Commune
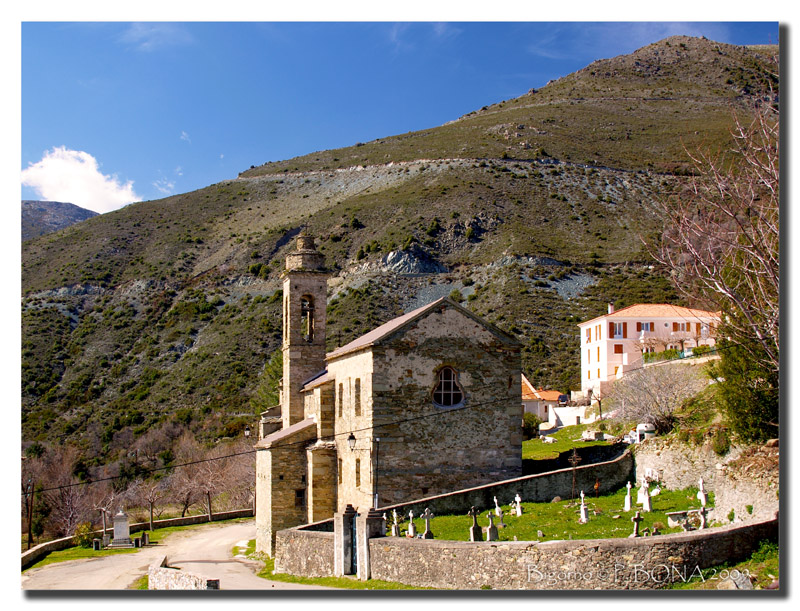
- The church of Santa-Maria-Assunta, in Bigorno
- Location of Bigorno
- Location within France Location within Corsica
- Coordinates: 42°31′30″N 9°18′00″E
- Country: France
- Region: Corsica
- Department: Haute-Corse
- Arrondissement: Corte
- Canton: Golo-Morosaglia

Government
  - Mayor (2020–2026): Christophe Graziani
- Area^{1}: 9 km^{2} (3.5 sq mi)
- Elevation: 640 m (2,100 ft)
- Highest elevation: 1,106 m (3,629 ft)
- Lowest elevation: 132 m (433 ft)
- Population (2023): 97
  - Density: 11/km^{2} (28/sq mi)
- Time zone: UTC+01:00 (CET)
  - Summer (DST): UTC+02:00 (CEST)
- INSEE/Postal code: 2B036 /20252
- ^{1} French Land Register data, which excludes lakes, ponds, glaciers > 1 km^{2} (0.386 sq mi or 247 acres) and river estuaries.

Bigorno (French pronunciation: [biɡɔʁno]; Corsican: Bigornu) is a commune in the Haute-Corse department of France on the island of Corsica. Since 2015, it is part of the canton of Golo-Morosaglia.

== Geography ==
Bigorno is 2 kilometres (1.2 mi) to the west of the seat of the canton Campitello.

== Population ==
Historical population
Year	Pop.	±% p.a.
1968	116	—
1975	86	−4.18%
1982	100	+2.18%
1990	61	−5.99%
1999	78	+2.77%
2007	79	+0.16%
2012	78	−0.25%
2017	90	+2.90%
2023	97	+1.26%
Source: INSEE

== See also ==
- Communes of the Haute-Corse department
