= Bustanico =

- Commune
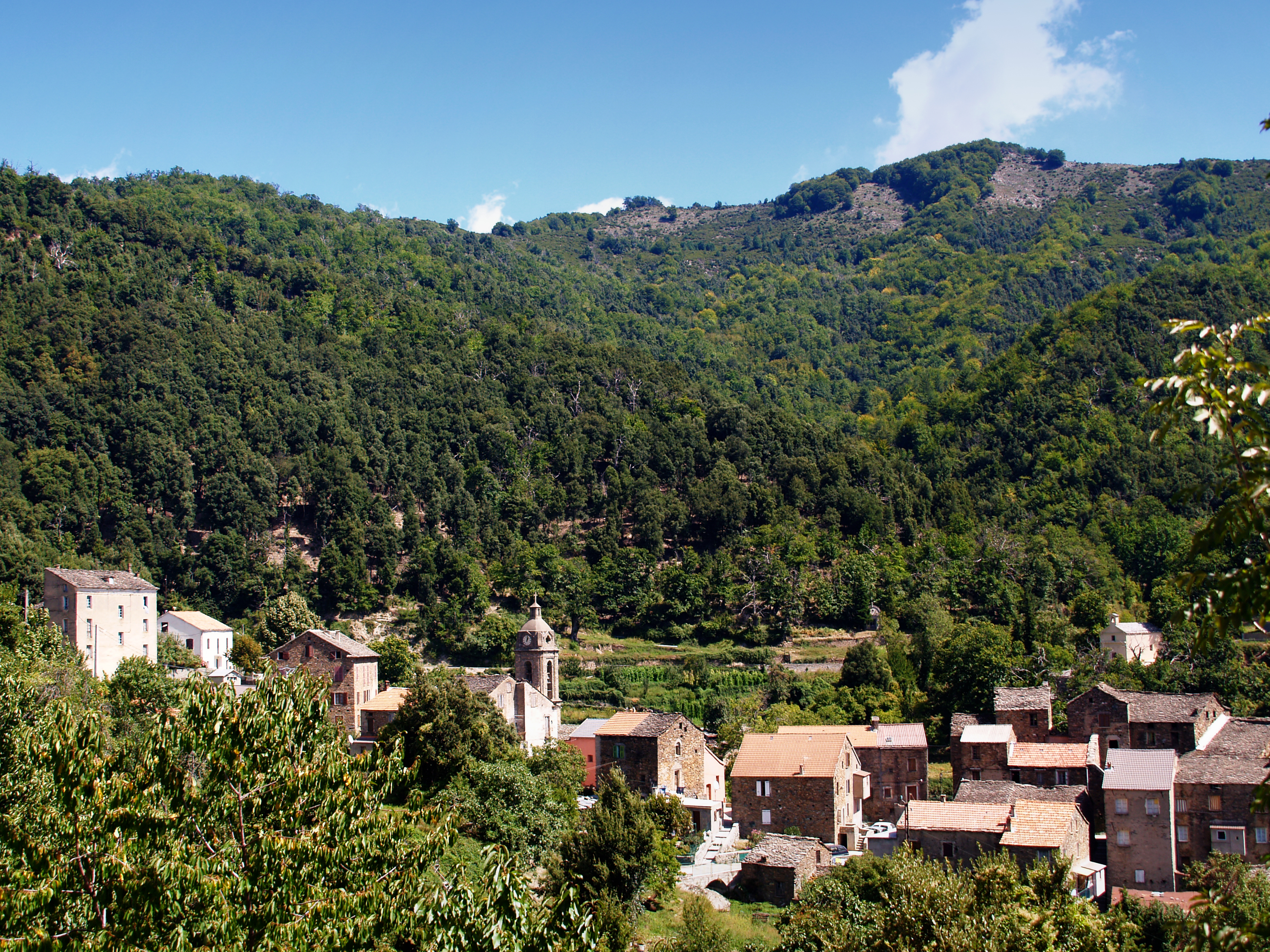
- A general view of Bustanico
- Location of Bustanico
- Location within France Location within Corsica
- Coordinates: 42°19′24″N 9°18′03″E
- Country: France
- Region: Corsica
- Department: Haute-Corse
- Arrondissement: Corte
- Canton: Golo-Morosaglia

Government
  - Mayor (2020–2026): Pierre Taddei
- Area^{1}: 11.52 km^{2} (4.45 sq mi)
- Elevation: 800 m (2,600 ft)
- Highest elevation: 1,727 m (5,666 ft)
- Lowest elevation: 617 m (2,024 ft)
- Population (2023): 65
  - Density: 5.6/km^{2} (15/sq mi)
- Time zone: UTC+01:00 (CET)
  - Summer (DST): UTC+02:00 (CEST)
- INSEE/Postal code: 2B045 /20212
- ^{1} French Land Register data, which excludes lakes, ponds, glaciers > 1 km^{2} (0.386 sq mi or 247 acres) and river estuaries.

Bustanico is a commune in the Haute-Corse department of France on the island of Corsica.

== Population ==
Historical population
Year	Pop.	±% p.a.
1968	123	—
1975	97	−3.34%
1982	75	−3.61%
1990	66	−1.59%
1999	77	+1.73%
2007	66	−1.91%
2012	60	−1.89%
2017	64	+1.30%
2023	65	+0.26%
Source: INSEE

== See also ==
- Communes of the Haute-Corse department
