= Crocicchia =

Crocicchia A Crucichja
- Commune
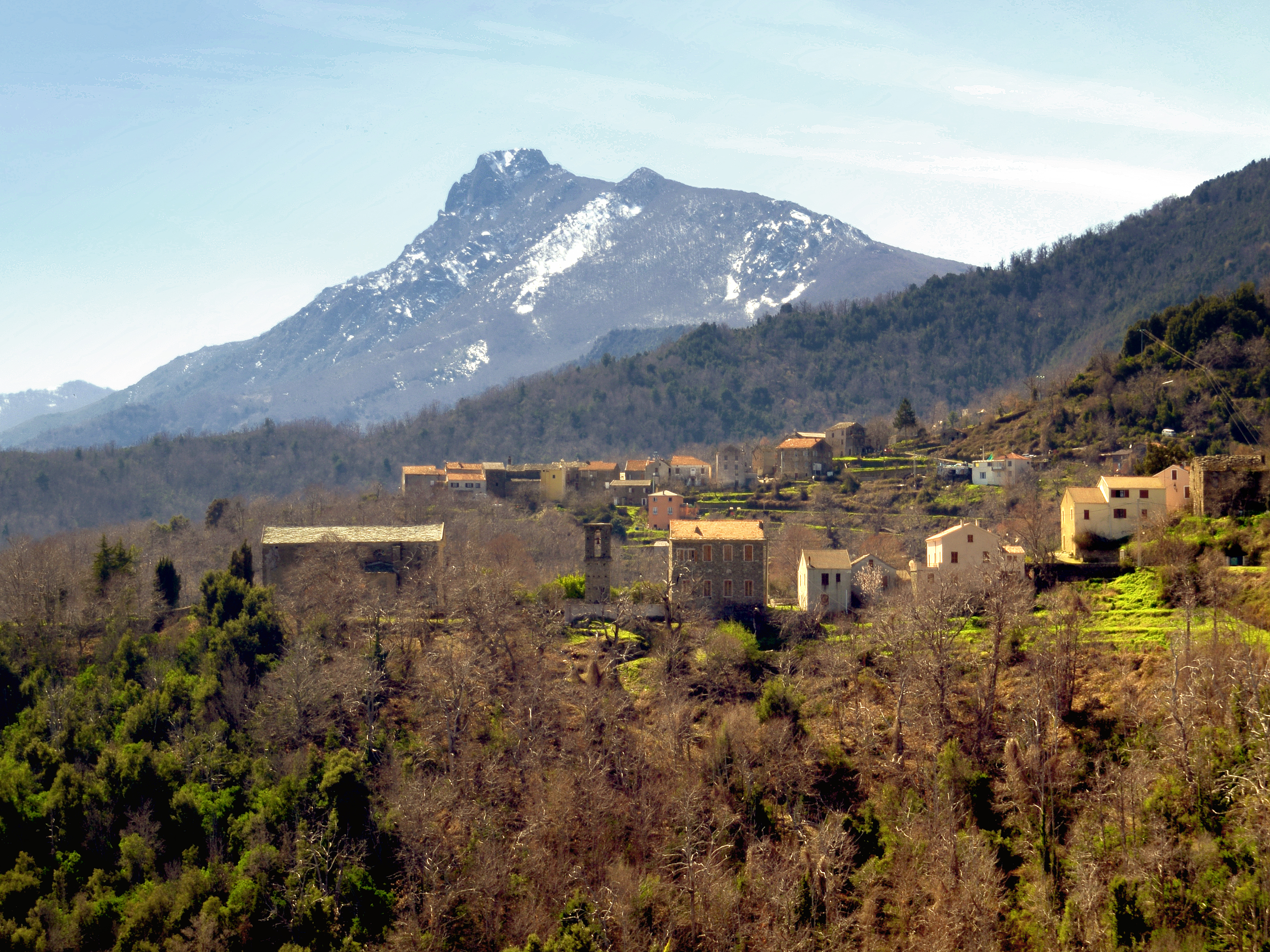
- The hamlet of Sant'Andrea and the church, with the Monte San Petrone in the background
- Location of Crocicchia
- Location within France Location within Corsica
- Coordinates: 42°27′58″N 9°21′04″E
- Country: France
- Region: Corsica
- Department: Haute-Corse
- Arrondissement: Corte
- Canton: Golo-Morosaglia

Government
  - Mayor (2024–2026): Pierre Pascal Piacentini
- Area^{1}: 4.3 km^{2} (1.7 sq mi)
- Elevation: 600 m (2,000 ft)
- Highest elevation: 1,041 m (3,415 ft)
- Lowest elevation: 195 m (640 ft)
- Population (2023): 81
  - Density: 19/km^{2} (49/sq mi)
- Time zone: UTC+01:00 (CET)
  - Summer (DST): UTC+02:00 (CEST)
- INSEE/Postal code: 2B102 /20290
- ^{1} French Land Register data, which excludes lakes, ponds, glaciers > 1 km^{2} (0.386 sq mi or 247 acres) and river estuaries.

Crocicchia is a commune in the Haute-Corse department of France on the island of Corsica. Since 2015, it is part of the canton of Golo-Morosaglia.

== Geography ==
Crocicchia is bounded on the east by the Casacconi, which flows into the Golo River.

== Population ==
Historical population
Year	Pop.	±% p.a.
1968	79	—
1975	58	−4.32%
1982	48	−2.67%
1990	62	+3.25%
1999	50	−2.36%
2007	42	−2.16%
2012	45	+1.39%
2017	70	+9.24%
2023	81	+2.46%
Source: INSEE

== See also ==
- Communes of the Haute-Corse department
