= Castellare-di-Mercurio =

- Commune
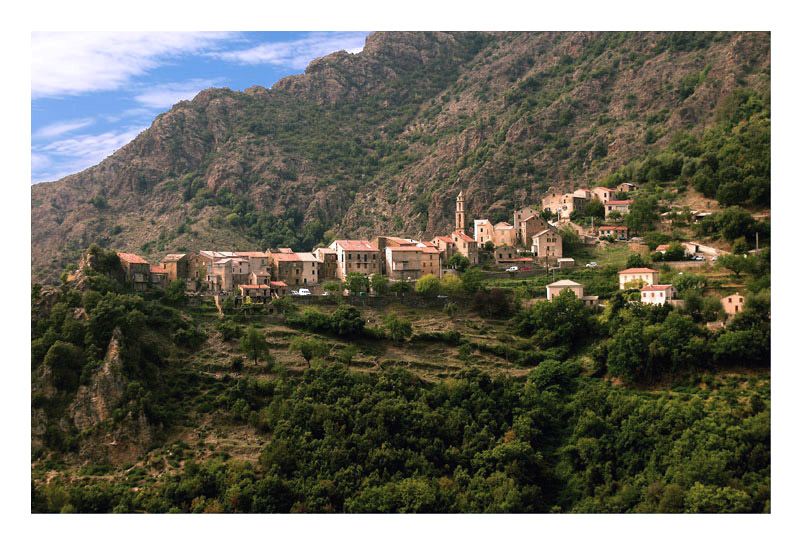
- A general view of Castellare-di-Mercurio
- Location of Castellare-di-Mercurio
- Location within France Location within Corsica
- Coordinates: 42°18′41″N 9°14′52″E
- Country: France
- Region: Corsica
- Department: Haute-Corse
- Arrondissement: Corte
- Canton: Golo-Morosaglia

Government
  - Mayor (2020–2026): Mathieu Giudicelli
- Area^{1}: 6.12 km^{2} (2.36 sq mi)
- Elevation: 600 m (2,000 ft)
- Highest elevation: 1,416 m (4,646 ft)
- Lowest elevation: 331 m (1,086 ft)
- Population (2023): 31
  - Density: 5.1/km^{2} (13/sq mi)
- Time zone: UTC+01:00 (CET)
  - Summer (DST): UTC+02:00 (CEST)
- INSEE/Postal code: 2B078 /20250
- ^{1} French Land Register data, which excludes lakes, ponds, glaciers > 1 km^{2} (0.386 sq mi or 247 acres) and river estuaries.

Castellare-di-Mercurio is a commune in the Haute-Corse department of France on the island of Corsica.

== Population ==
Historical population
| Year | Pop. | ±% p.a. |
|---|---|---|
| 1968 | 90 | — |
| 1975 | 45 | −9.43% |
| 1982 | 38 | −2.39% |
| 1990 | 29 | −3.32% |
| 1999 | 25 | −1.64% |
| 2007 | 34 | +3.92% |
| 2012 | 33 | −0.60% |
| 2017 | 31 | −1.24% |
| 2023 | 31 | +0.00% |
Source: INSEE

== See also ==
- Communes of the Haute-Corse department
