= Campile, Haute-Corse =

Campile
- Commune
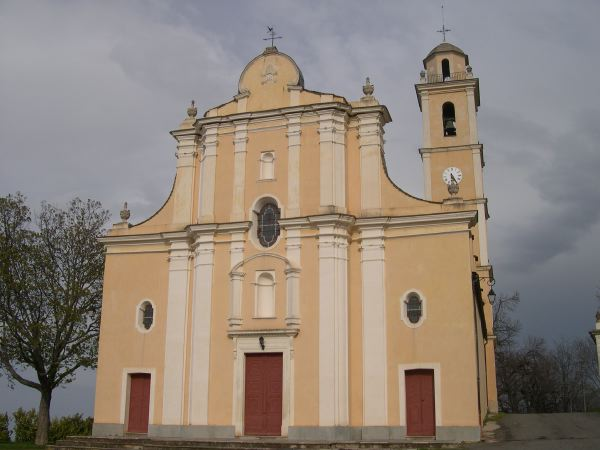
- The church of Saint-Pierre and Saint-Paul, in Campile
- Location of Campile
- Location within France Location within Corsica
- Coordinates: 42°29′23″N 9°21′19″E
- Country: France
- Region: Corsica
- Department: Haute-Corse
- Arrondissement: Corte
- Canton: Golo-Morosaglia

Government
  - Mayor (2020–2026): Jean-Marie Vecchioni
- Area^{1}: 9.8 km^{2} (3.8 sq mi)
- Elevation: 543 m (1,781 ft)
- Highest elevation: 1,011 m (3,317 ft)
- Lowest elevation: 76 m (249 ft)
- Population (2023): 181
  - Density: 18/km^{2} (48/sq mi)
- Time zone: UTC+01:00 (CET)
  - Summer (DST): UTC+02:00 (CEST)
- INSEE/Postal code: 2B054 /20290
- ^{1} French Land Register data, which excludes lakes, ponds, glaciers > 1 km^{2} (0.386 sq mi or 247 acres) and river estuaries.

Campile is a commune in the Haute-Corse department of France on the island of Corsica. Since 2015, it is part of the canton of Golo-Morosaglia.

== Geography ==
Campile is 18 kilometres (11 mi) south-southeast of Campitello, to the south of the River Golo in Castagniccia.

== Population ==
Historical population
Year	Pop.	±% p.a.
1968	304	—
1975	232	−3.79%
1982	242	+0.60%
1990	196	−2.60%
1999	199	+0.17%
2007	198	−0.06%
2012	185	−1.35%
2017	195	+1.06%
2023	181	−1.23%
Source: INSEE

== See also ==
- Communes of the Haute-Corse department
