= Rusio =

Rusiu
- Commune
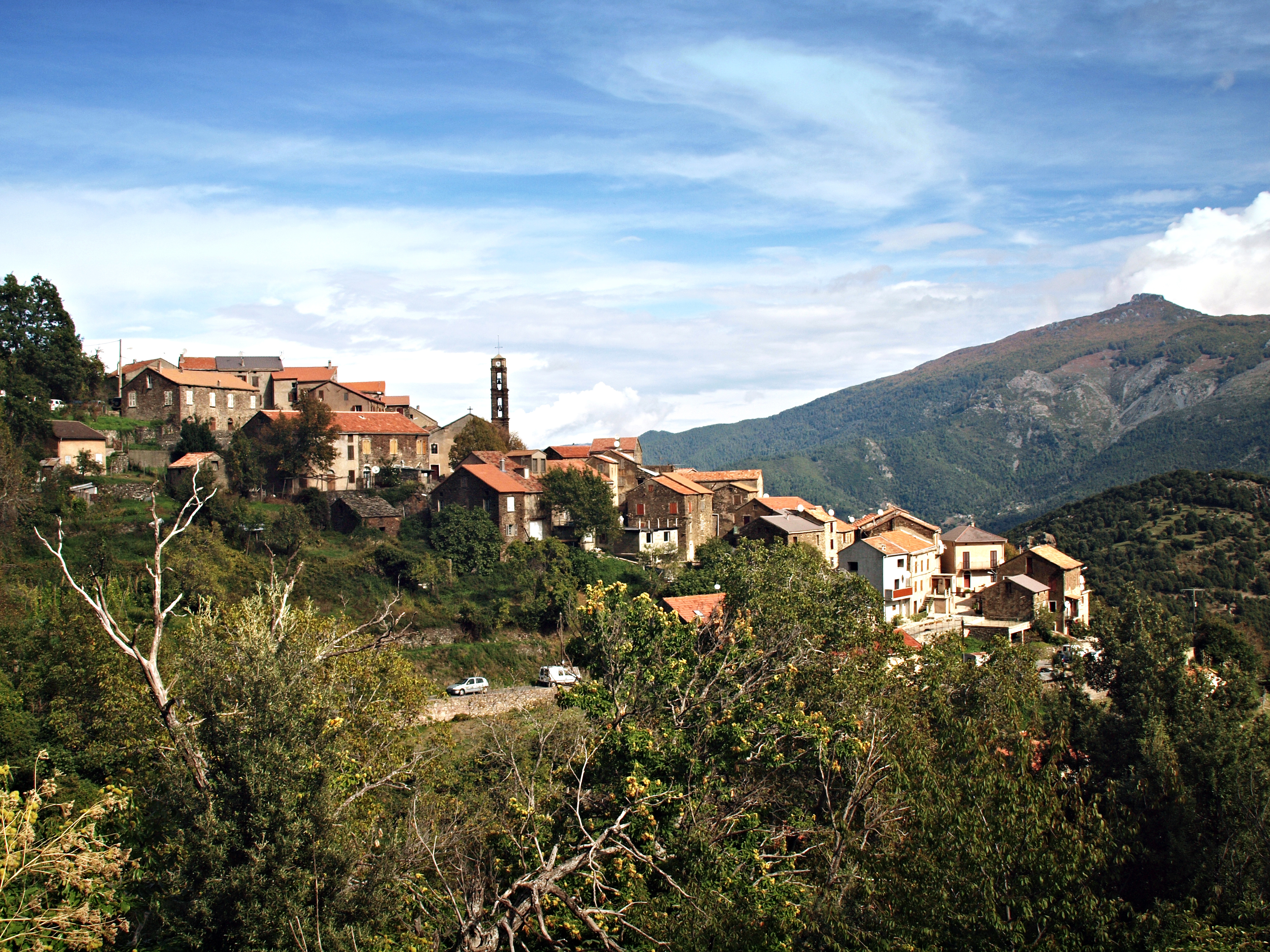
- A view of Rusio
- Location of Rusiu
- Location within France Location within Corsica
- Coordinates: 42°21′45″N 9°15′41″E
- Country: France
- Region: Corsica
- Department: Haute-Corse
- Arrondissement: Corte
- Canton: Golo-Morosaglia

Government
  - Mayor (2020–2026): Ange Toussaint Rocchi
- Area^{1}: 8.58 km^{2} (3.31 sq mi)
- Elevation: 950 m (3,120 ft)
- Highest elevation: 1,585 m (5,200 ft)
- Lowest elevation: 640 m (2,100 ft)
- Population (2023): 65
  - Density: 7.6/km^{2} (20/sq mi)
- Time zone: UTC+01:00 (CET)
  - Summer (DST): UTC+02:00 (CEST)
- INSEE/Postal code: 2B264 /20244
- ^{1} French Land Register data, which excludes lakes, ponds, glaciers > 1 km^{2} (0.386 sq mi or 247 acres) and river estuaries.

Rusio is a commune in the Haute-Corse department of France on the island of Corsica.

== Geography ==
=== Climate ===
Rusio has a hot-summer Mediterranean climate (Köppen climate classification Csa). The average annual temperature in Rusio is 13.2 °C (55.8 °F). The average annual rainfall is 1,003.0 mm (39.49 in) with November as the wettest month. The temperatures are highest on average in August, at around 22.9 °C (73.2 °F), and lowest in January, at around 5.2 °C (41.4 °F). The highest temperature ever recorded in Rusio was 38.5 °C (101.3 °F) on 4 August 2017; the coldest temperature ever recorded was −10.5 °C (13.1 °F) on 27 February 2018.

Climate data for Rusio (1991−2020 normals, extremes 2007−2020)
Month	Jan	Feb	Mar	Apr	May	Jun	Jul	Aug	Sep	Oct	Nov	Dec	Year
Record high °C (°F)	20.5 (68.9)	20.5 (68.9)	24.5 (76.1)	25.5 (77.9)	33.5 (92.3)	35.5 (95.9)	38.0 (100.4)	38.5 (101.3)	34.0 (93.2)	31.0 (87.8)	23.0 (73.4)	19.0 (66.2)	38.5 (101.3)
Mean daily maximum °C (°F)	9.1 (48.4)	9.5 (49.1)	12.4 (54.3)	16.5 (61.7)	19.9 (67.8)	25.2 (77.4)	28.9 (84.0)	29.1 (84.4)	23.9 (75.0)	18.9 (66.0)	13.1 (55.6)	10.2 (50.4)	18.1 (64.6)
Daily mean °C (°F)	5.2 (41.4)	5.3 (41.5)	7.9 (46.2)	11.6 (52.9)	14.8 (58.6)	19.4 (66.9)	22.7 (72.9)	22.9 (73.2)	18.4 (65.1)	14.2 (57.6)	9.4 (48.9)	6.4 (43.5)	13.2 (55.8)
Mean daily minimum °C (°F)	1.3 (34.3)	1.1 (34.0)	3.4 (38.1)	6.7 (44.1)	9.7 (49.5)	13.7 (56.7)	16.5 (61.7)	16.6 (61.9)	12.8 (55.0)	9.5 (49.1)	5.7 (42.3)	2.6 (36.7)	8.3 (46.9)
Record low °C (°F)	−6.0 (21.2)	−10.5 (13.1)	−5.0 (23.0)	−1.5 (29.3)	0.0 (32.0)	5.5 (41.9)	9.5 (49.1)	11.0 (51.8)	5.0 (41.0)	0.0 (32.0)	−4.0 (24.8)	−6.5 (20.3)	−10.5 (13.1)
Average precipitation mm (inches)	80.1 (3.15)	94.6 (3.72)	94.5 (3.72)	67.0 (2.64)	93.6 (3.69)	49.1 (1.93)	48.9 (1.93)	35.1 (1.38)	63.3 (2.49)	113.1 (4.45)	172.9 (6.81)	90.8 (3.57)	1,003 (39.49)
Average precipitation days (≥ 1.0 mm)	8.1	9.3	9.7	8.6	8.9	5.5	3.7	3.5	6.0	7.8	10.3	7.7	89.0
Source: Météo-France

== Population ==
Historical population
Year	Pop.	±% p.a.
1968	108	—
1975	100	−1.09%
1982	83	−2.63%
1990	57	−4.59%
1999	66	+1.64%
2007	79	+2.27%
2012	79	+0.00%
2017	71	−2.11%
2023	65	−1.46%
Source: INSEE

== See also ==
- Communes of the Haute-Corse department
