= Antoine Christophe Saliceti =

French politician

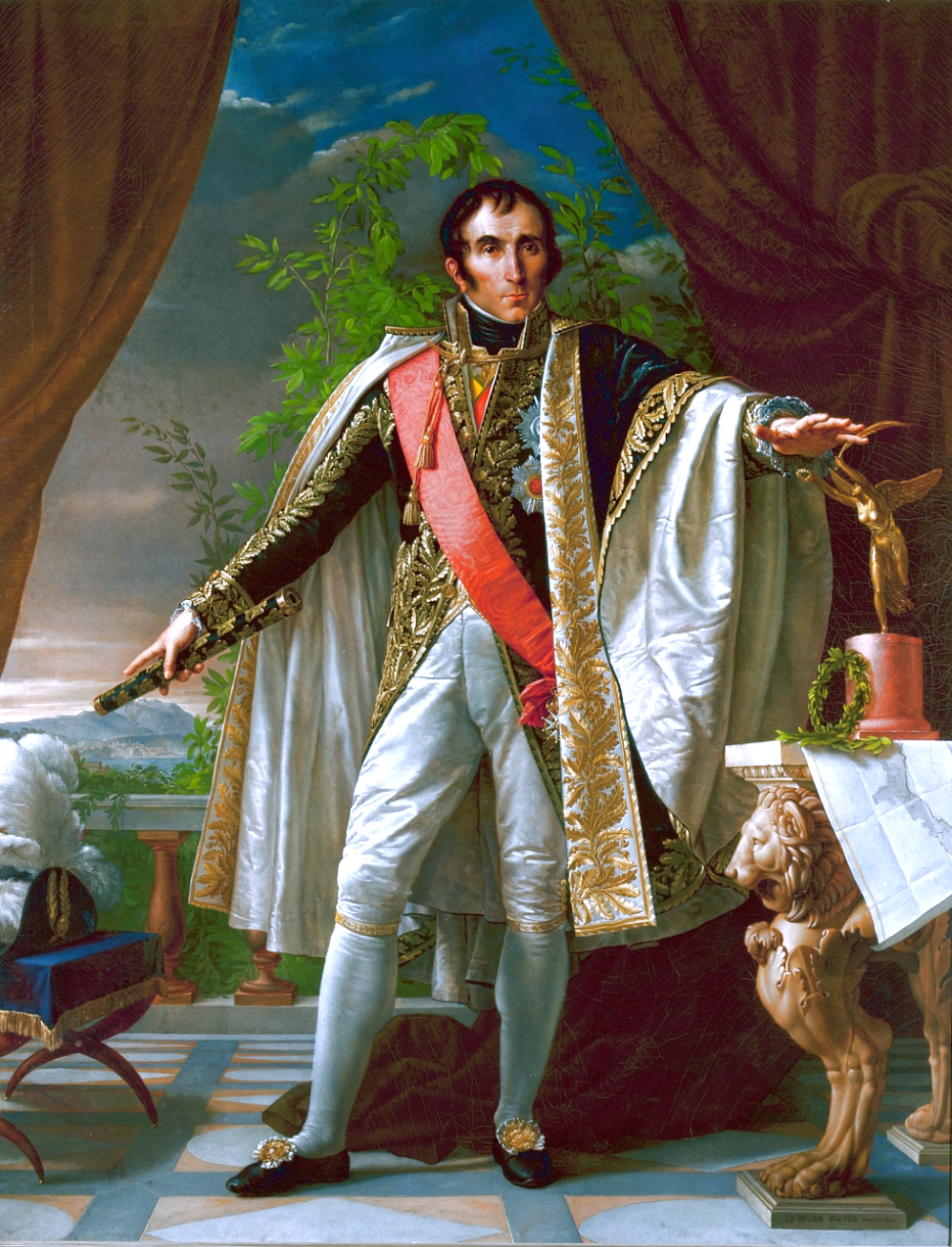
- Christophe Saliceti; portrait by Jean-Baptiste Wicar (1808)

Member of the National Constituent Assembly of 1789
- In office 3 June 1789 – 30 September 1791
- Monarch: Louis XVI

Personal details
- Born: Antonio Cristoforo Saliceti; 26 August 1757 Saliceto, Corsica
- Died: 23 December 1809 (aged 52) Naples, Italy
- Party: Montagnard (1789-1794); Crêtois (1794-1796); Thermidorien (1796-1799); Bonapartiste (1799-1809)
- Education: University of Pisa
- Profession: Diplomat, politician

Antoine Christophe Saliceti (baptised in the name of Antonio Cristoforo Saliceti: Antoniu Cristufaru Saliceti in Corsican; 26 August 1757 – 23 December 1809) was a French politician and diplomat of the Revolution and First Empire.

== Early career ==
He was born a member of a Piacentine family in Saliceto, Haute-Corse. He was born during the era of the Corsican Republic, but after the Conquest of Corsica the island became French. After studying law at the University of Pisa, he became a lawyer at the upper council of Bastia, and was elected deputy of the Third Estate to the French Estates-General of 1789.

As deputy to the National Convention, Saliceti became a Montagnard and on 15 January 1793 voted for the death of King Louis XVI, and was sent to Corsica on mission to oversee Pasquale Paoli and enforce the Reign of Terror; however, he was compelled to withdraw to Provence, where he took part in repressing the revolts at Marseille and Toulon. During this time he met and promoted his compatriot Napoleon Bonaparte.

== Directory, Consulate, and Empire ==
On account of his friendship with Maximilien Robespierre, Saliceti was denounced by the Thermidorian Reaction and was saved only by the amnesty of the French Directory. In 1796 Saliceti was commissioned to organize the French Revolutionary Army in the Italian Peninsula, and the two départements into which Corsica had been divided after its recapture. Saliceti also became deputy to the Council of the Five Hundred, and served the Directory in missions to the Ligurian Republic. Saliceti represented France during the negotiations with the Papal States regarding the Armistice of Bologna.

Although an adversary of Napoleon's 18 Brumaire Coup which created the Consulate (9 November 1799), he was kept by Napoleon as his representative to the Republic of Lucca (1801–1802) and Liguria (1805), engineering the territory's annexation to the Empire. In 1806, he followed Joseph Bonaparte to the Kingdom of Naples, where Joseph had been imposed as King, and served as minister of police and of war. Saliceti died in Naples in mysterious circumstances, possibly poisoned.

== Bibliography ==
- 1793 - Réponse du citoyen Saliceti, imprimée et publiée en Corse, le 14 juin dernier, aux faits calomnieux contenus dans la lettre du 15 mai dernier, écrite par les membres du conseil du département de Corse rebelles, et actuellement en état d'accusation, aux citoyens Delcher et Lacombe-Saint-Michel, représentans du peuple, qui l'ont méprisée, et que Costantini, soi-disant député extraordinaire dudit département, a fait réimprimer et distribuer le 9 de ce mois, six jours après le départ de Saliceti pour sa mission. A Paris: De l'Imprimerie de Pain
- 1795 - Salicetti, représentant du peuple, a la Convention nationale. Paris: De l'Imprimerie nationale
- 1795 - Compte rendu a la Convention nationale. A Paris: De l'Imprimerie nationale
- 1797 - Motion d'ordre de Salicetti, sur les secours à accorder aux réfugiés Corses
