= Castineta =

- Commune
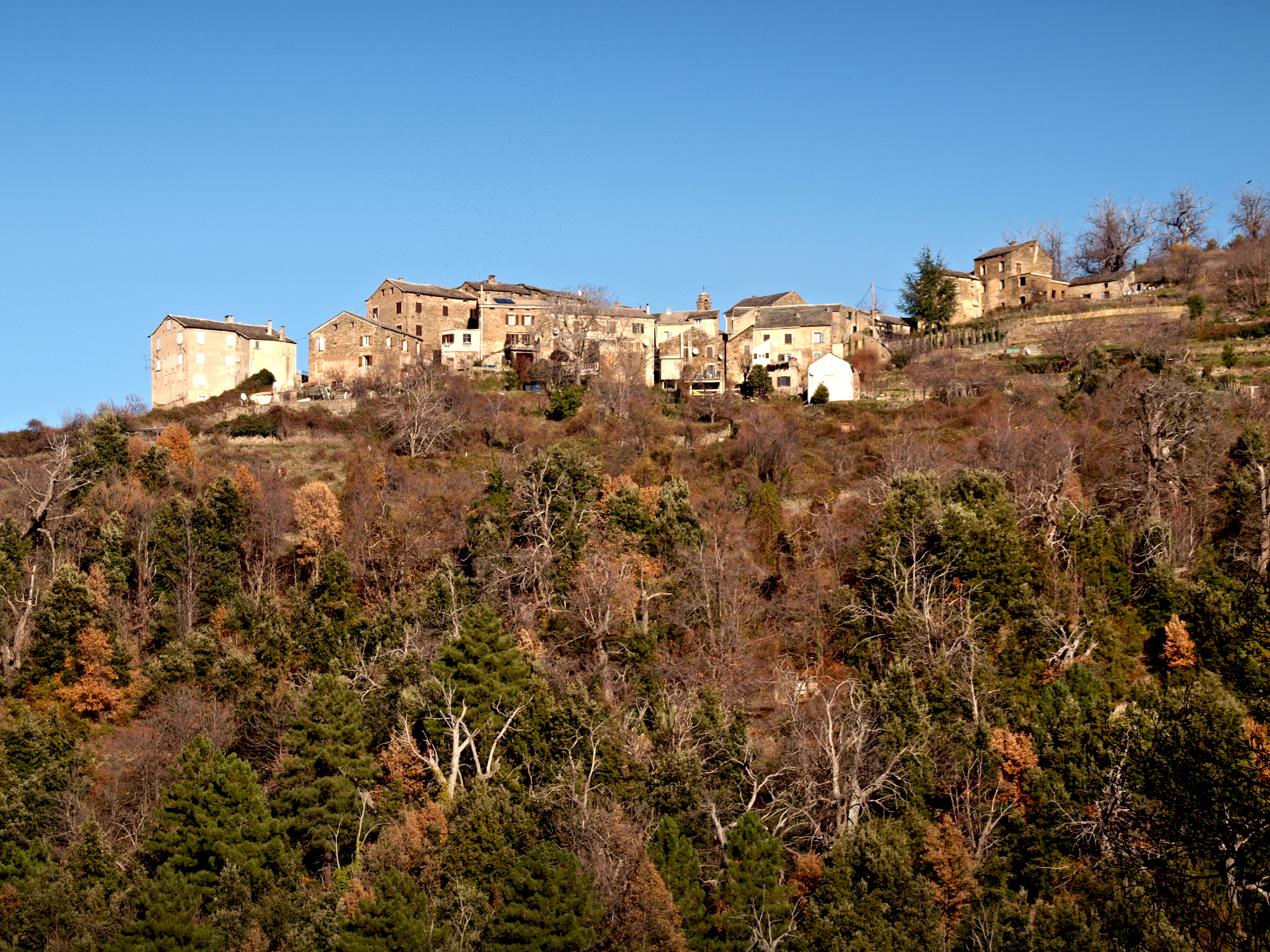
- A general view of the village
- Location of Castineta
- Location within France Location within Corsica
- Coordinates: 42°25′24″N 9°17′59″E
- Country: France
- Region: Corsica
- Department: Haute-Corse
- Arrondissement: Corte
- Canton: Golo-Morosaglia

Government
  - Mayor (2020–2026): Jean Marc Giamarchi
- Area^{1}: 9.15 km^{2} (3.53 sq mi)
- Elevation: 800 m (2,600 ft)
- Highest elevation: 1,563 m (5,128 ft)
- Lowest elevation: 255 m (837 ft)
- Population (2023): 34
  - Density: 3.7/km^{2} (9.6/sq mi)
- Time zone: UTC+01:00 (CET)
  - Summer (DST): UTC+02:00 (CEST)
- INSEE/Postal code: 2B082 /20218
- ^{1} French Land Register data, which excludes lakes, ponds, glaciers > 1 km^{2} (0.386 sq mi or 247 acres) and river estuaries.

Castineta is a commune in the Haute-Corse department of France on the island of Corsica.

== Population ==
Historical population
Year	Pop.	±% p.a.
1968	63	—
1975	45	−4.69%
1982	37	−2.76%
1990	31	−2.19%
1999	53	+6.14%
2007	54	+0.23%
2012	51	−1.14%
2017	41	−4.27%
2023	34	−3.07%
Source: INSEE

== Rusumini ==
Rusumini is an archaeological site in Corsica. It is located in the commune.

== See also ==
- Communes of the Haute-Corse department
