= Canton of Golo-Morosaglia =

Coordinates: 42.44°N 9.30°E

The Canton of Golo-Morosaglia (Corsican: Cantone di Golu è Merusaglia) is an administrative division of the Haute-Corse department, Corsica, France. It was created at the French canton reorganisation which came into effect in March 2015. Its seat is in Morosaglia.

It consists of the following communes:

1. Aiti
2. Alando
3. Albertacce
4. Alzi
5. Asco
6. Bigorno
7. Bisinchi
8. Bustanico
9. Calacuccia
10. Cambia
11. Campile
12. Campitello
13. Canavaggia
14. Carticasi
15. Casamaccioli
16. Castellare-di-Mercurio
17. Castello-di-Rostino
18. Castifao
19. Castiglione
20. Castineta
21. Castirla
22. Corscia
23. Crocicchia
24. Erbajolo
25. Érone
26. Favalello
27. Focicchia
28. Gavignano
29. Lano
30. Lento
31. Lozzi
32. Mazzola
33. Moltifao
34. Monte
35. Morosaglia
36. Olmo
37. Omessa
38. Ortiporio
39. Penta-Acquatella
40. Piedigriggio
41. Pietralba
42. Popolasca
43. Prato-di-Giovellina
44. Prunelli-di-Casacconi
45. Rusio
46. Saliceto
47. San-Lorenzo
48. Santa-Lucia-di-Mercurio
49. Sant'Andréa-di-Bozio
50. Scolca
51. Sermano
52. Soveria
53. Tralonca
54. Valle-di-Rostino
55. Volpajola
