= Popolasca =

- Commune
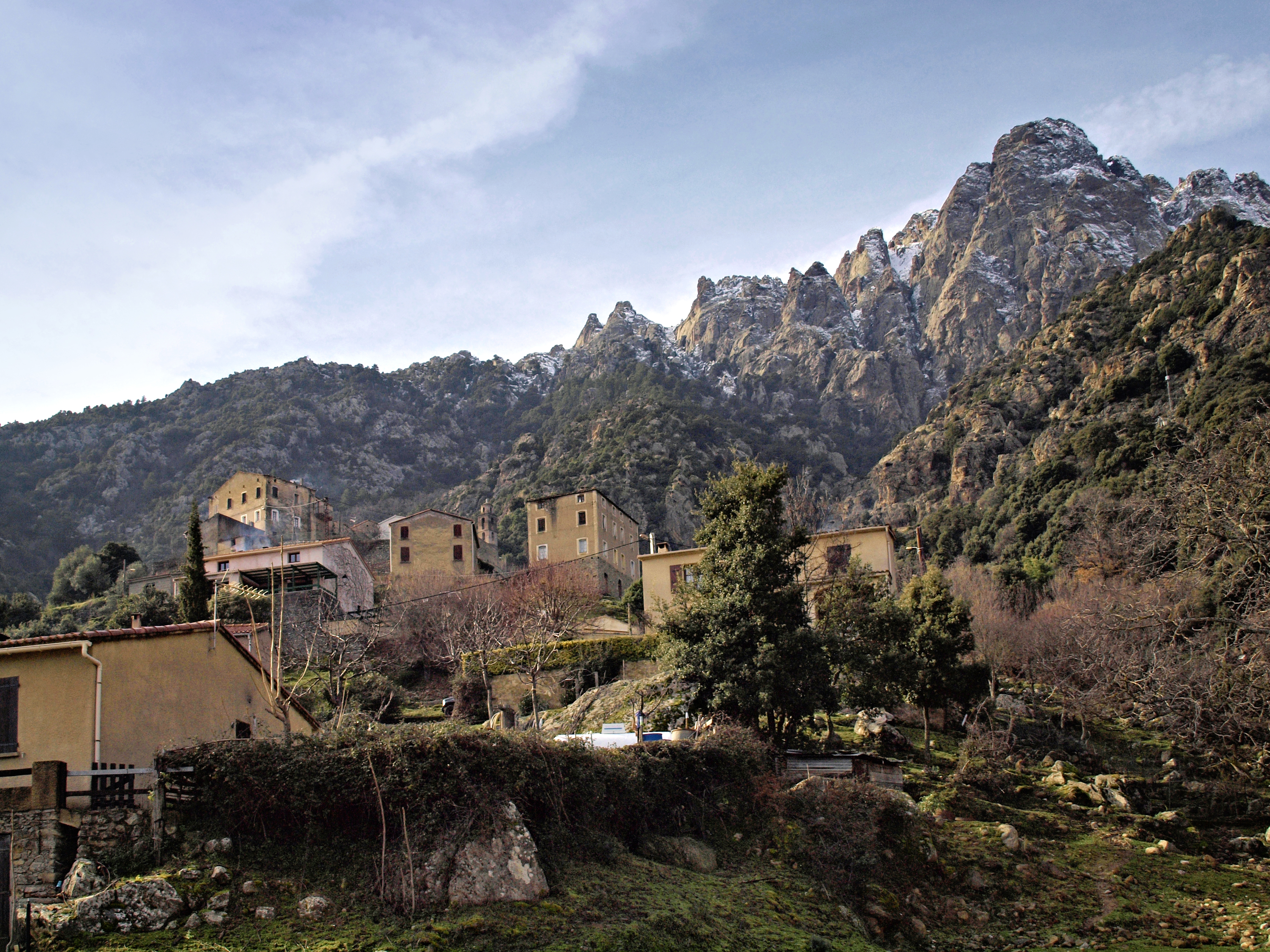
- The village and mountains around Popolasca
- Location of Popolasca
- Location within France Location within Corsica
- Coordinates: 42°26′00″N 9°07′59″E
- Country: France
- Region: Corsica
- Department: Haute-Corse
- Arrondissement: Corte
- Canton: Golo-Morosaglia

Government
  - Mayor (2020–2026): Lucien Costa
- Area^{1}: 10.24 km^{2} (3.95 sq mi)
- Elevation: 600 m (2,000 ft)
- Highest elevation: 1,760 m (5,770 ft)
- Lowest elevation: 380 m (1,250 ft)
- Population (2023): 41
  - Density: 4.0/km^{2} (10/sq mi)
- Time zone: UTC+01:00 (CET)
  - Summer (DST): UTC+02:00 (CEST)
- INSEE/Postal code: 2B244 /20218
- ^{1} French Land Register data, which excludes lakes, ponds, glaciers > 1 km^{2} (0.386 sq mi or 247 acres) and river estuaries.

Popolasca is a commune in the Haute-Corse department of France on the island of Corsica.

== Population ==
Historical population
Year	Pop.	±% p.a.
1968	59	—
1975	43	−4.42%
1982	39	−1.39%
1990	31	−2.83%
1999	36	+1.68%
2007	47	+3.39%
2012	50	+1.25%
2017	45	−2.09%
2023	41	−1.54%
Source: INSEE

== See also ==
- Communes of the Haute-Corse department
