= Favalello =

- Commune
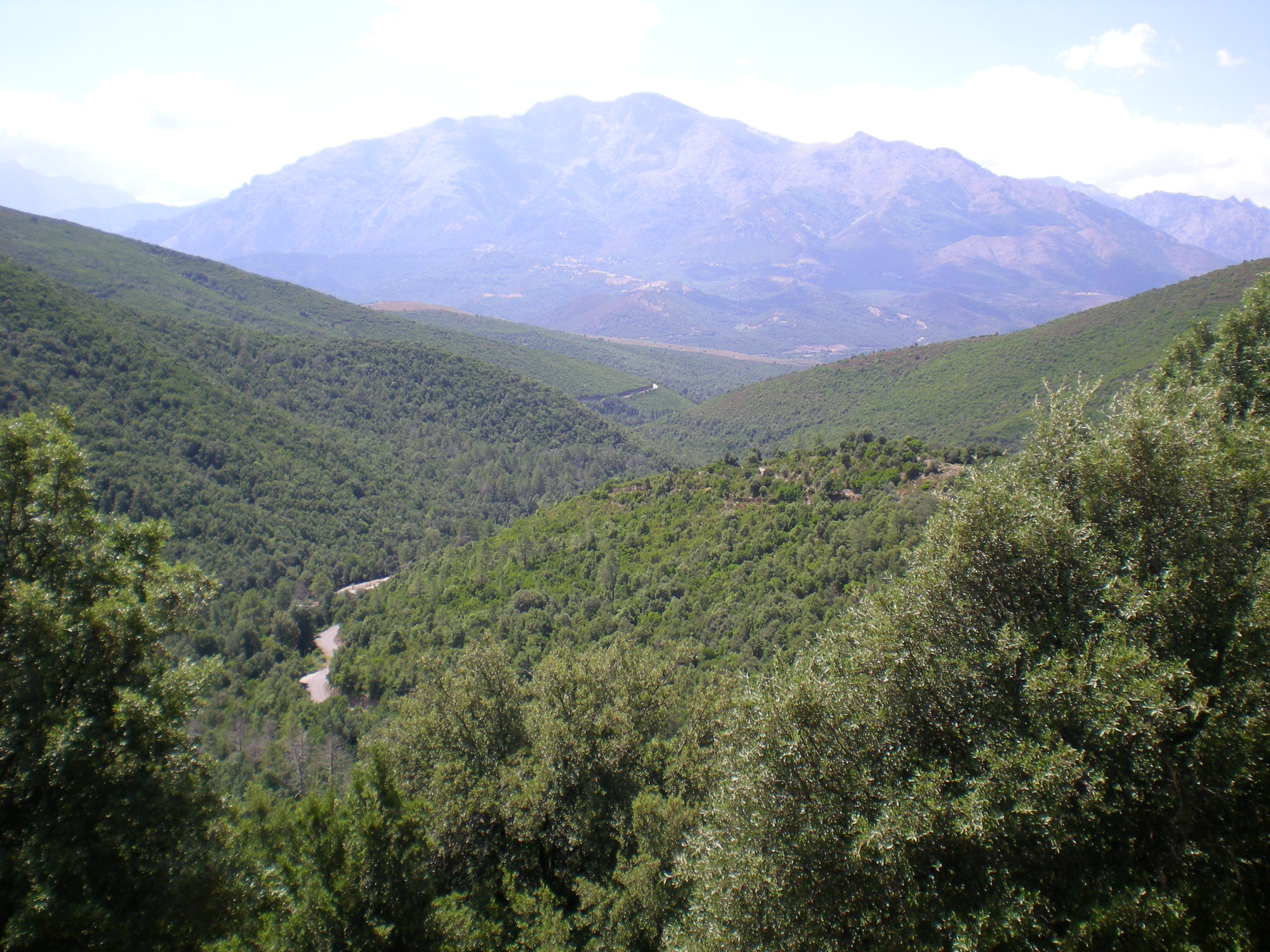
- Monte Cardo
- Location of Favalello
- Location within France Location within Corsica
- Coordinates: 42°17′43″N 9°16′20″E
- Country: France
- Region: Corsica
- Department: Haute-Corse
- Arrondissement: Corte
- Canton: Golo-Morosaglia

Government
  - Mayor (2020–2026): Lucie Albertini
- Area^{1}: 5.56 km^{2} (2.15 sq mi)
- Elevation: 545 m (1,788 ft)
- Highest elevation: 680 m (2,230 ft)
- Lowest elevation: 305 m (1,001 ft)
- Population (2023): 71
  - Density: 13/km^{2} (33/sq mi)
- Time zone: UTC+01:00 (CET)
  - Summer (DST): UTC+02:00 (CEST)
- INSEE/Postal code: 2B110 /20212
- ^{1} French Land Register data, which excludes lakes, ponds, glaciers > 1 km^{2} (0.386 sq mi or 247 acres) and river estuaries.

Favalello (French pronunciation: [favalɛlo]; Corsican: U Favalellu) is a commune in the Haute-Corse department of France on the island of Corsica.

== Population ==
Historical population
Year	Pop.	±% p.a.
1968	20	—
1975	21	+0.70%
1982	27	+3.66%
1990	33	+2.54%
1999	47	+4.01%
2007	39	−2.31%
2012	61	+9.36%
2017	76	+4.50%
2023	71	−1.13%
Source: INSEE

== See also ==
- Communes of the Haute-Corse department
