= Santa-Lucia-di-Mercurio =

Santa Lucia di Mercurio Santa Lucia di Mercoriu
- Commune
- Location of Santa Lucia di Mercurio
- Location within France Location within Corsica
- Coordinates: 42°19′37″N 9°13′18″E
- Country: France
- Region: Corsica
- Department: Haute-Corse
- Arrondissement: Corte
- Canton: Golo-Morosaglia
- Area^{1}: 23.79 km^{2} (9.19 sq mi)
- Elevation: 894 m (2,933 ft)
- Highest elevation: 1,585 m (5,200 ft)
- Lowest elevation: 318 m (1,043 ft)
- Population (2023): 115
  - Density: 4.83/km^{2} (12.5/sq mi)
- Time zone: UTC+01:00 (CET)
  - Summer (DST): UTC+02:00 (CEST)
- INSEE/Postal code: 2B306 /20250
- ^{1} French Land Register data, which excludes lakes, ponds, glaciers > 1 km^{2} (0.386 sq mi or 247 acres) and river estuaries.

Santa-Lucia-di-Mercurio is a commune in the Haute-Corse department of France on the island of Corsica.

== Population ==
Historical population
Year	Pop.	±% p.a.
1968	170	—
1975	104	−6.78%
1982	100	−0.56%
1990	66	−5.06%
1999	69	+0.50%
2007	87	+2.94%
2012	97	+2.20%
2017	111	+2.73%
2023	115	+0.59%
Source: INSEE

== See also ==
- Communes of the Haute-Corse department
