= Monte, Haute-Corse =

Monte U Monte
- Commune
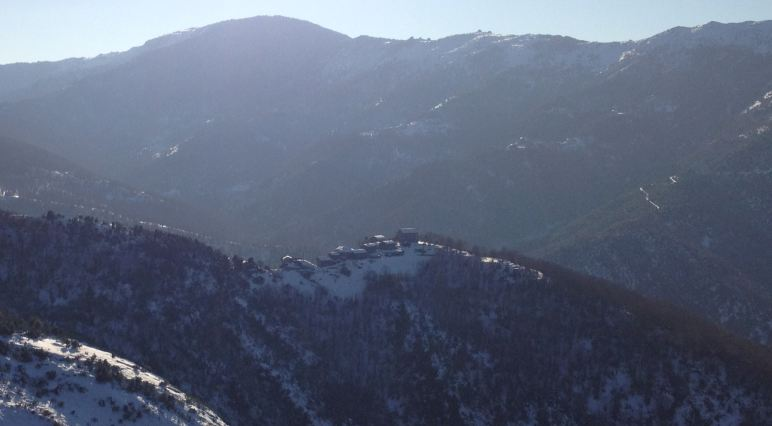
- The village of Divina in winter
- Location of Monte
- Location within France Location within Corsica
- Coordinates: 42°28′03″N 9°23′28″E
- Country: France
- Region: Corsica
- Department: Haute-Corse
- Arrondissement: Corte
- Canton: Golo-Morosaglia

Government
  - Mayor (2020–2026): Jean François Mattei
- Area^{1}: 14.8 km^{2} (5.7 sq mi)
- Elevation: 640 m (2,100 ft)
- Highest elevation: 1,218 m (3,996 ft)
- Lowest elevation: 18 m (59 ft)
- Population (2023): 650
  - Density: 44/km^{2} (110/sq mi)
- Time zone: UTC+01:00 (CET)
  - Summer (DST): UTC+02:00 (CEST)
- INSEE/Postal code: 2B166 /20290
- ^{1} French Land Register data, which excludes lakes, ponds, glaciers > 1 km^{2} (0.386 sq mi or 247 acres) and river estuaries.

Monte is a commune in the Haute-Corse department of France on the island of Corsica. Since 2015, it is part of the canton of Golo-Morosaglia.

== Geography ==
Monte is at the foot of Monte Sant'Angelu, 18 kilometres (11 mi) from Borgo.

== Population ==
Historical population
Year	Pop.	±% p.a.
1968	207	—
1975	189	−1.29%
1982	241	+3.53%
1990	303	+2.90%
1999	444	+4.34%
2007	510	+1.75%
2012	622	+4.05%
2017	607	−0.49%
2023	650	+1.15%
Source: INSEE

== See also ==
- Communes of the Haute-Corse department
