= Prato-di-Giovellina =

- Commune
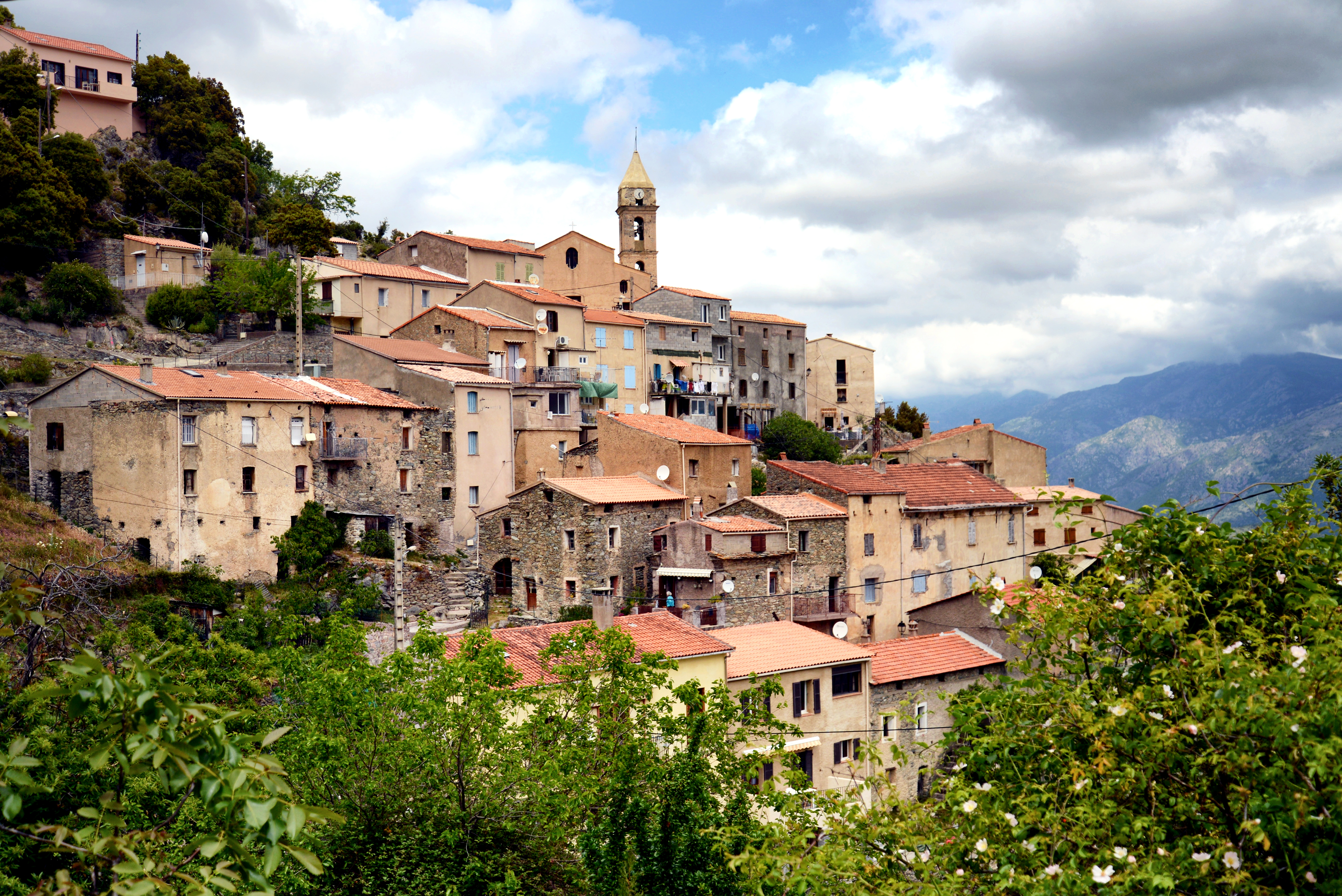
- A view of the village of Prato-di-Giovellina
- Location of Prato-di-Giovellina
- Location within France Location within Corsica
- Coordinates: 42°25′28″N 9°09′51″E
- Country: France
- Region: Corsica
- Department: Haute-Corse
- Arrondissement: Corte
- Canton: Golo-Morosaglia

Government
  - Mayor (2020–2026): Pierre Nasica
- Area^{1}: 12.21 km^{2} (4.71 sq mi)
- Elevation: 650 m (2,130 ft)
- Highest elevation: 848 m (2,782 ft)
- Lowest elevation: 235 m (771 ft)
- Population (2023): 52
  - Density: 4.3/km^{2} (11/sq mi)
- Time zone: UTC+01:00 (CET)
  - Summer (DST): UTC+02:00 (CEST)
- INSEE/Postal code: 2B248 /20218
- ^{1} French Land Register data, which excludes lakes, ponds, glaciers > 1 km^{2} (0.386 sq mi or 247 acres) and river estuaries.

Prato-di-Giovellina is a commune in the Haute-Corse department of France on the island of Corsica.

== Population ==
Historical population
Year	Pop.	±% p.a.
1968	57	—
1975	54	−0.77%
1982	47	−1.96%
1990	39	−2.31%
1999	40	+0.28%
2007	53	+3.58%
2012	44	−3.65%
2017	42	−0.93%
2023	52	+3.62%
Source: INSEE

== See also ==
- Communes of the Haute-Corse department
