= Alando, Haute-Corse =

Alando
- Commune
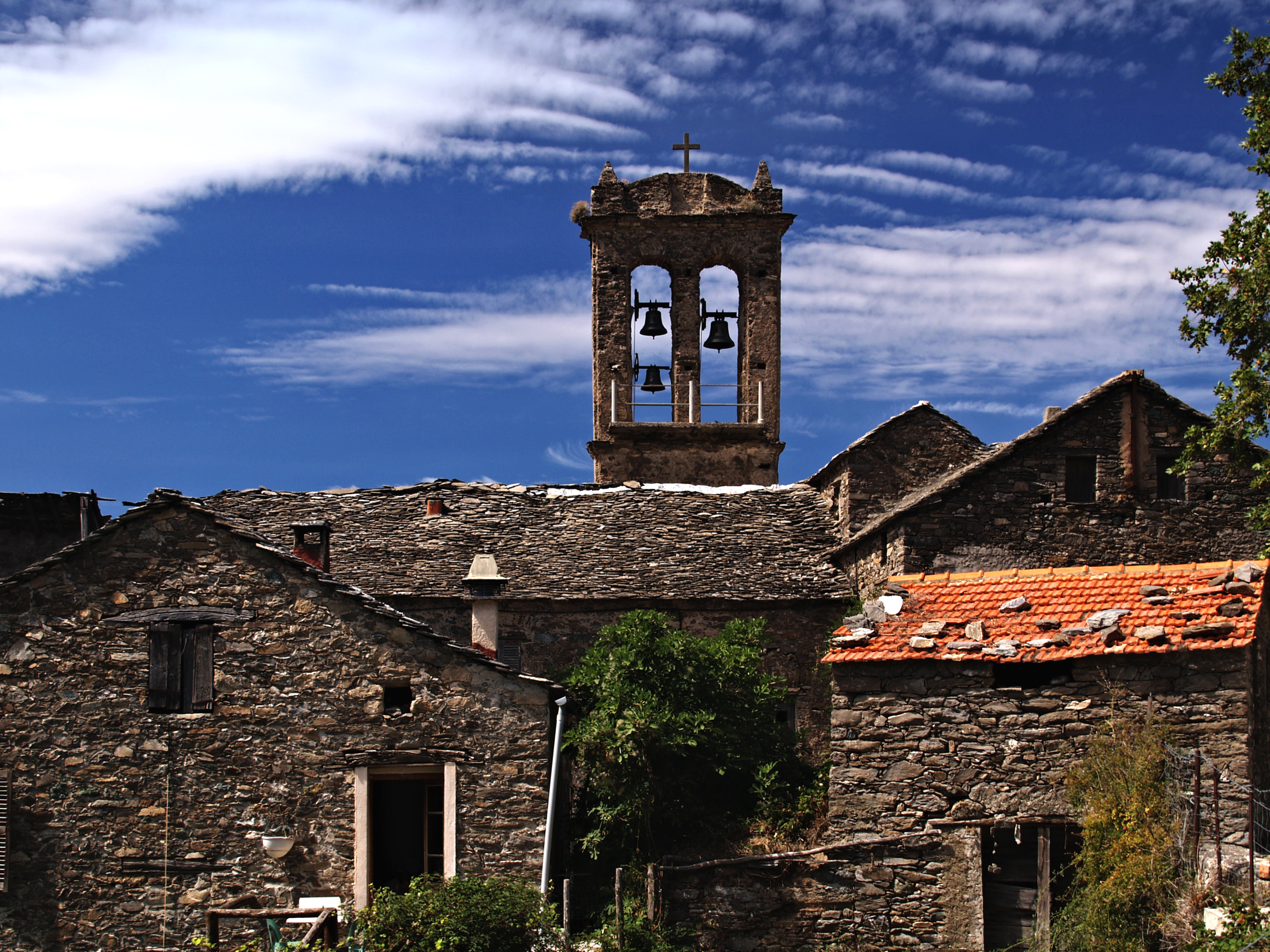
- Former convent
- Location of Alando
- Location within France Location within Corsica
- Coordinates: 42°18′26″N 9°17′28″E
- Country: France
- Region: Corsica
- Department: Haute-Corse
- Arrondissement: Corte
- Canton: Golo-Morosaglia
- Intercommunality: Pasquale Paoli

Government
  - Mayor (2020–2026): Guy Mamelli
- Area^{1}: 3.05 km^{2} (1.18 sq mi)
- Elevation: 660 m (2,170 ft)
- Highest elevation: 1,040 m (3,410 ft)
- Lowest elevation: 480 m (1,570 ft)
- Population (2023): 30
  - Density: 9.8/km^{2} (25/sq mi)
- Time zone: UTC+01:00 (CET)
  - Summer (DST): UTC+02:00 (CEST)
- INSEE/Postal code: 2B005 /20250
- ^{1} French Land Register data, which excludes lakes, ponds, glaciers > 1 km^{2} (0.386 sq mi or 247 acres) and river estuaries.

Alando is a commune in the Haute-Corse department of France on the island of Corsica.

== Population ==
Historical population
Year	Pop.	±% p.a.
1968	51	—
1975	42	−2.74%
1982	38	−1.42%
1990	15	−10.97%
1999	23	+4.86%
2007	26	+1.54%
2012	29	+2.21%
2017	35	+3.83%
2023	30	−2.54%
Source: INSEE

== See also ==
- Communes of the Haute-Corse department
