= Saliceto, Haute-Corse =

Saliceto
- Commune
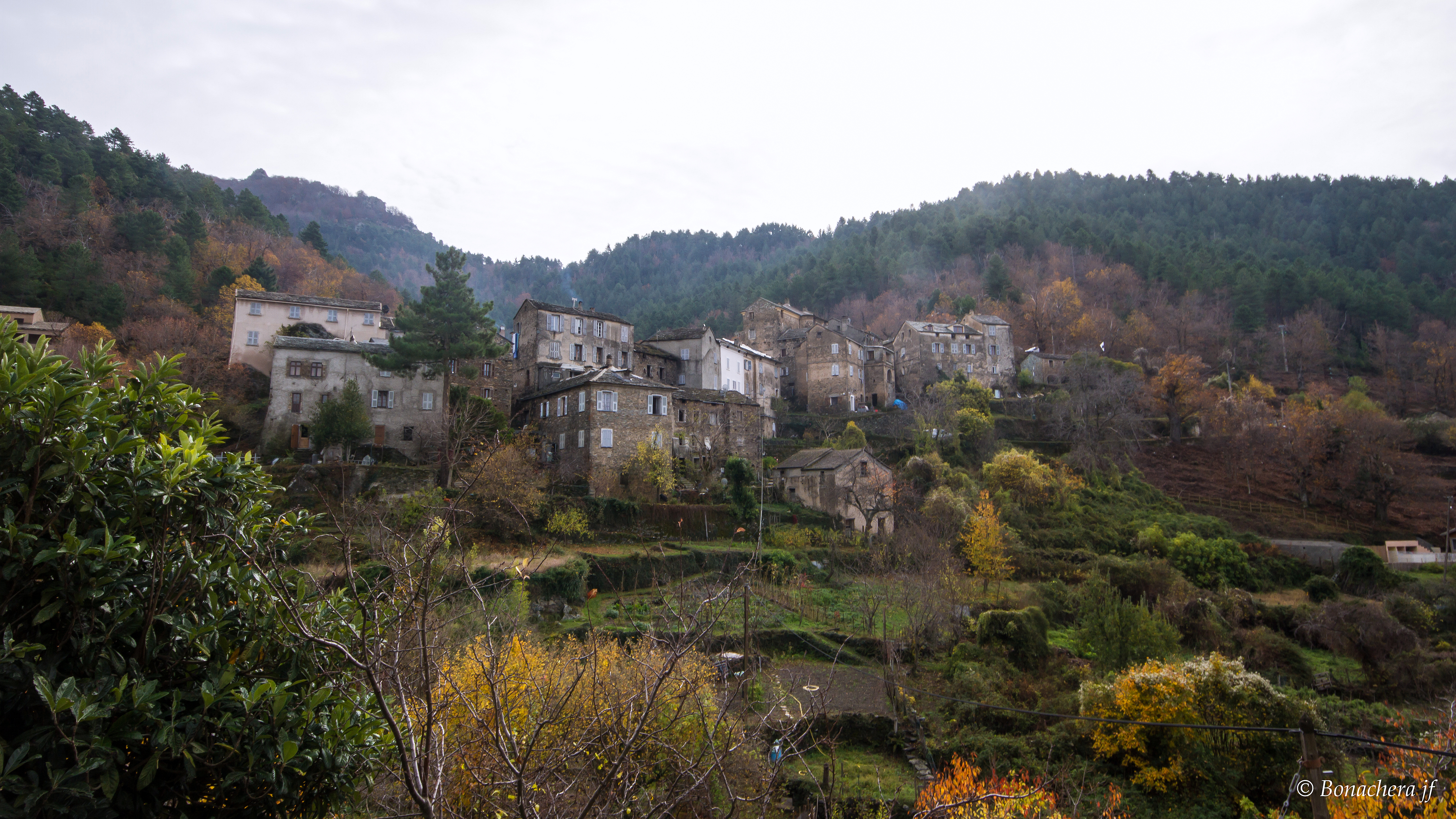
- A view of Saliceto from the road to Gavignano
- Location of Saliceto
- Location within France Location within Corsica
- Coordinates: 42°24′01″N 9°17′43″E
- Country: France
- Region: Corsica
- Department: Haute-Corse
- Arrondissement: Corte
- Canton: Golo-Morosaglia

Government
  - Mayor (2020–2026): Antoine Simonpietri
- Area^{1}: 12.54 km^{2} (4.84 sq mi)
- Elevation: 750 m (2,460 ft)
- Highest elevation: 1,729 m (5,673 ft)
- Lowest elevation: 220 m (720 ft)
- Population (2023): 46
  - Density: 3.7/km^{2} (9.5/sq mi)
- Time zone: UTC+01:00 (CET)
  - Summer (DST): UTC+02:00 (CEST)
- INSEE/Postal code: 2B267 /20218
- ^{1} French Land Register data, which excludes lakes, ponds, glaciers > 1 km^{2} (0.386 sq mi or 247 acres) and river estuaries.

Saliceto is a commune in the Castagnicca valley near the town of Corte in the Haute-Corse department of France on the island of Corsica.

The village is the birthplace of Antoine Christophe Saliceti. The village consists of about two dozen stonewall houses and a small Catholic church.

== Population ==
Historical population
| Year | Pop. | ±% p.a. |
|---|---|---|
| 1968 | 85 | — |
| 1975 | 71 | −2.54% |
| 1982 | 69 | −0.41% |
| 1990 | 52 | −3.47% |
| 1999 | 47 | −1.12% |
| 2007 | 65 | +4.14% |
| 2012 | 61 | −1.26% |
| 2017 | 50 | −3.90% |
| 2023 | 46 | −1.38% |
Source: INSEE

== International relations ==
Saliceto is twinned with Saliceto, Italy.

== See also ==
- Communes of the Haute-Corse department
