= Olmo, Haute-Corse =

Olmo L'Olmu
- Commune
- Location of Olmo
- Location within France Location within Corsica
- Coordinates: 42°29′43″N 9°24′19″E
- Country: France
- Region: Corsica
- Department: Haute-Corse
- Arrondissement: Corte
- Canton: Golo-Morosaglia

Government
  - Mayor (2020–2026): Fortuné Felicelli
- Area^{1}: 4.5 km^{2} (1.7 sq mi)
- Elevation: 580 m (1,900 ft)
- Highest elevation: 696 m (2,283 ft)
- Lowest elevation: 19 m (62 ft)
- Population (2023): 138
  - Density: 31/km^{2} (79/sq mi)
- Time zone: UTC+01:00 (CET)
  - Summer (DST): UTC+02:00 (CEST)
- INSEE/Postal code: 2B192 /20290
- ^{1} French Land Register data, which excludes lakes, ponds, glaciers > 1 km^{2} (0.386 sq mi or 247 acres) and river estuaries.

Olmo (French pronunciation: [ɔlmo]; Corsican: L'Olmu) is a commune in the Haute-Corse department of France on the island of Corsica. Since 2015, it is part of the canton of Golo-Morosaglia.

== Geography ==
Olmo is 13 kilometres (8 mi) from Borgo.

== Population ==
Historical population
Year	Pop.	±% p.a.
1968	281	—
1975	180	−6.16%
1982	142	−3.33%
1990	98	−4.53%
1999	168	+6.17%
2007	206	+2.58%
2012	184	−2.23%
2017	160	−2.76%
2023	138	−2.44%
Source: INSEE

== See also ==
- Communes of the Haute-Corse department
