= Canavaggia =

Canavaggia Canavaghja
- Commune
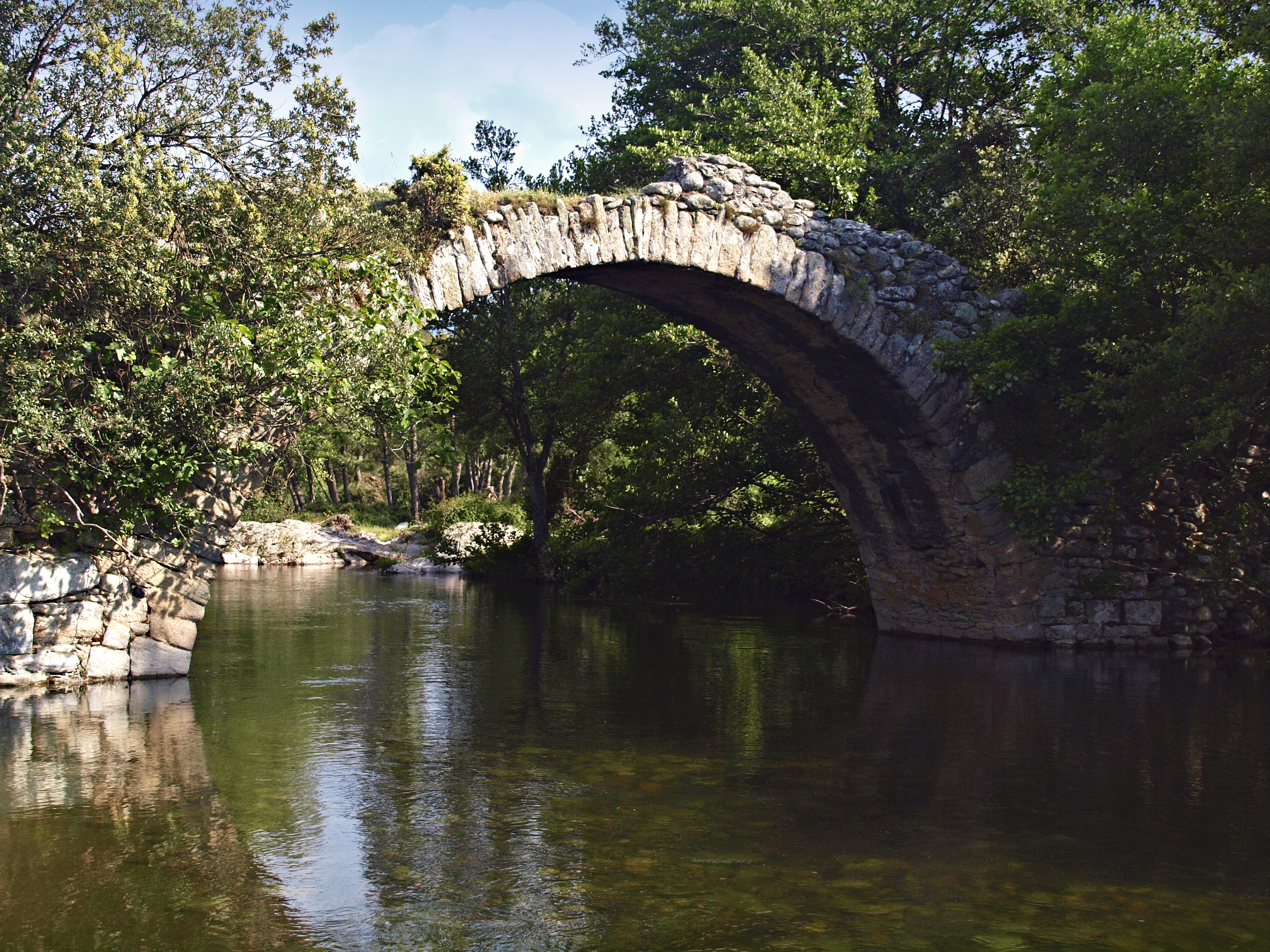
- The Pontare Bridge, in Canavaggia
- Location of Canavaggia
- Location within France Location within Corsica
- Coordinates: 42°30′09″N 9°15′55″E
- Country: France
- Region: Corsica
- Department: Haute-Corse
- Arrondissement: Corte
- Canton: Golo-Morosaglia

Government
  - Mayor (2020–2026): Jean Félix Pasqualini
- Area^{1}: 25.3 km^{2} (9.8 sq mi)
- Elevation: 698 m (2,290 ft)
- Highest elevation: 1,323 m (4,341 ft)
- Lowest elevation: 151 m (495 ft)
- Population (2023): 123
  - Density: 4.86/km^{2} (12.6/sq mi)
- Time zone: UTC+01:00 (CET)
  - Summer (DST): UTC+02:00 (CEST)
- INSEE/Postal code: 2B059 /20235
- ^{1} French Land Register data, which excludes lakes, ponds, glaciers > 1 km^{2} (0.386 sq mi or 247 acres) and river estuaries.

Canavaggia is a commune in the Haute-Corse department of France on the island of Corsica. Since 2015, it is part of the canton of Golo-Morosaglia.

== Population ==
Historical population
Year	Pop.	±% p.a.
1968	124	—
1975	111	−1.57%
1982	100	−1.48%
1990	77	−3.21%
1999	98	+2.72%
2007	110	+1.45%
2012	99	−2.09%
2017	103	+0.80%
2023	123	+3.00%
Source: INSEE

== See also ==
- Communes of the Haute-Corse department
