= Castello-di-Rostino =

Castello-di-Rostino Castellu di Rustinu (Corsican)
- Commune
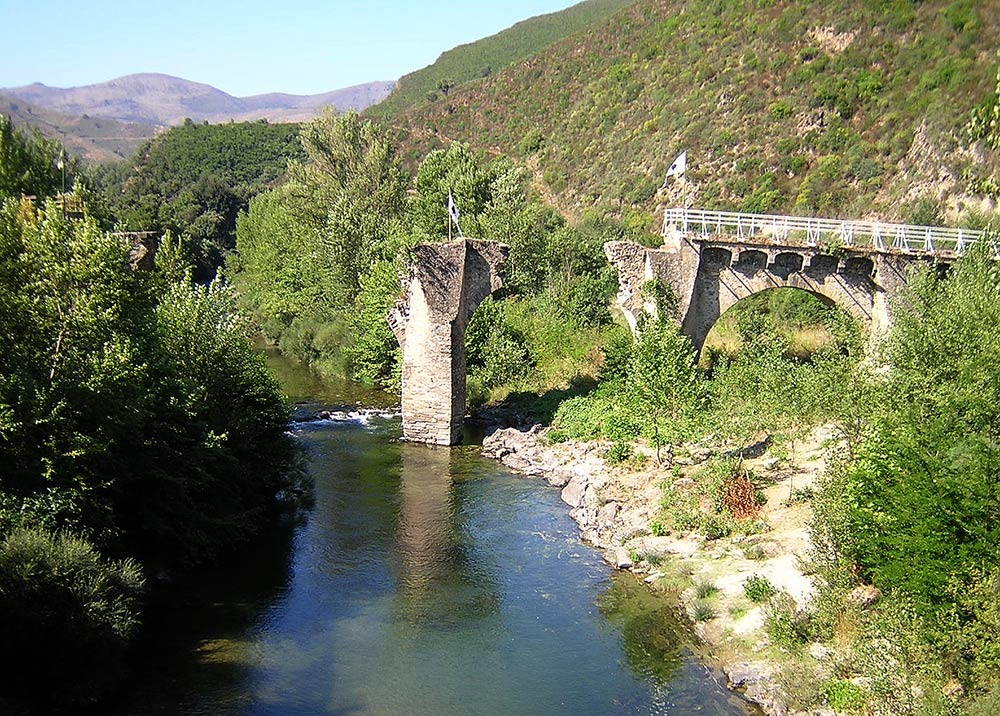
- Ponte Novu
- Location of Castello-di-Rostino
- Location within France Location within Corsica
- Coordinates: 42°27′52″N 9°18′56″E
- Country: France
- Region: Corsica
- Department: Haute-Corse
- Arrondissement: Corte
- Canton: Golo-Morosaglia
- Intercommunality: Pasquale Paoli

Government
  - Mayor (2020–2026): Frédéric Soustre
- Area^{1}: 12.4 km^{2} (4.8 sq mi)
- Highest elevation: 1,200 m (3,900 ft)
- Lowest elevation: 134 m (440 ft)
- Population (2023): 522
  - Density: 42.1/km^{2} (109/sq mi)
- Time zone: UTC+01:00 (CET)
  - Summer (DST): UTC+02:00 (CEST)
- INSEE/Postal code: 2B079 /20235
- ^{1} French Land Register data, which excludes lakes, ponds, glaciers > 1 km^{2} (0.386 sq mi or 247 acres) and river estuaries.

Castello-di-Rostino (French pronunciation: [kastɛlo di ʁɔstino]; Corsican: Castellu di Rustinu) is a commune in the Haute-Corse department of France on the island of Corsica.

== Population ==
Historical population
Year	Pop.	±% p.a.
1968	320	—
1975	286	−1.59%
1982	274	−0.61%
1990	252	−1.04%
1999	277	+1.06%
2007	351	+3.00%
2012	414	+3.36%
2017	471	+2.61%
2023	522	+1.73%
Source: INSEE

== See also ==
- Communes of the Haute-Corse department
