= Prunelli-di-Casacconi =

Prunelli-di-Casacconi I Prunelli-di-Casacconi
- Commune
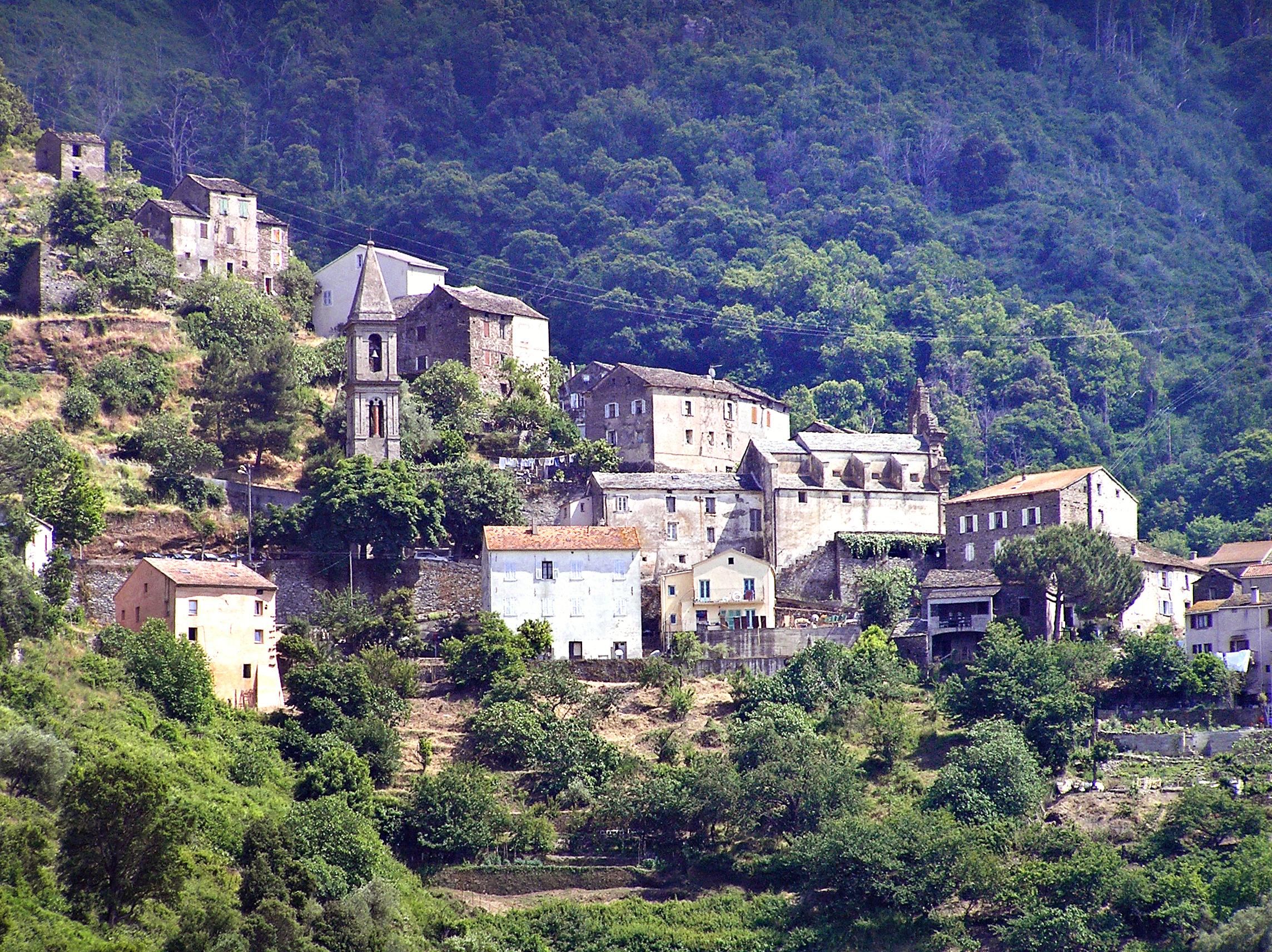
- A general view of Prunelli-di-Casacconi
- Location of Prunelli-di-Casacconi
- Location within France Location within Corsica
- Coordinates: 42°30′12″N 9°24′08″E
- Country: France
- Region: Corsica
- Department: Haute-Corse
- Arrondissement: Corte
- Canton: Golo-Morosaglia

Government
  - Mayor (2020–2026): Christiane Mariotti
- Area^{1}: 6 km^{2} (2.3 sq mi)
- Elevation: 300 m (980 ft)
- Highest elevation: 404 m (1,325 ft)
- Lowest elevation: 24 m (79 ft)
- Population (2023): 151
  - Density: 25/km^{2} (65/sq mi)
- Time zone: UTC+01:00 (CET)
  - Summer (DST): UTC+02:00 (CEST)
- INSEE/Postal code: 2B250 /20290
- ^{1} French Land Register data, which excludes lakes, ponds, glaciers > 1 km^{2} (0.386 sq mi or 247 acres) and river estuaries.

Prunelli-di-Casacconi (French pronunciation: [pʁynɛli d(i) kazakɔni]) is a commune in the Haute-Corse department of France on the island of Corsica.

It is part of the canton of Golo-Morosaglia.

== Geography ==
Prunelli-di-Casacconi is 14 kilometres (9 mi) from Borgo.

== Population ==
Historical population
Year	Pop.	±% p.a.
1968	198	—
1975	184	−1.04%
1982	183	−0.08%
1990	146	−2.78%
1999	162	+1.16%
2007	161	−0.08%
2012	156	−0.63%
2017	150	−0.78%
2023	151	+0.11%
Source: INSEE

== See also ==
- Communes of the Haute-Corse department
