= Piedigriggio =

- Commune
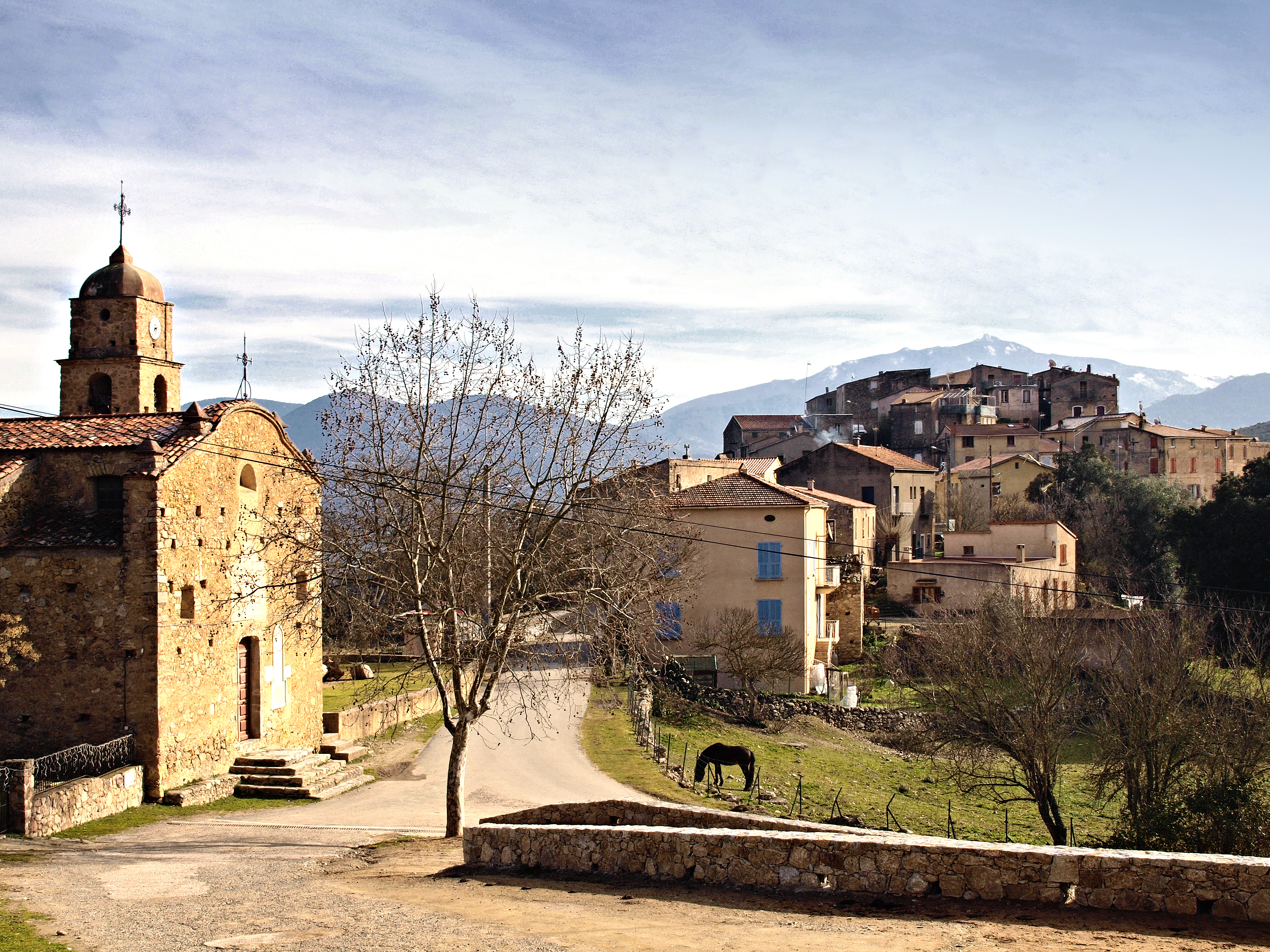
- The church and the village of Piedigriggio
- Location of Piedigriggio
- Location within France Location within Corsica
- Coordinates: 42°26′55″N 9°10′23″E
- Country: France
- Region: Corsica
- Department: Haute-Corse
- Arrondissement: Corte
- Canton: Golo-Morosaglia

Government
  - Mayor (2020–2026): Nicolette Albertini-Colonna
- Area^{1}: 10.43 km^{2} (4.03 sq mi)
- Elevation: 360 m (1,180 ft)
- Highest elevation: 770 m (2,530 ft)
- Lowest elevation: 200 m (660 ft)
- Population (2023): 164
  - Density: 15.7/km^{2} (40.7/sq mi)
- Time zone: UTC+01:00 (CET)
  - Summer (DST): UTC+02:00 (CEST)
- INSEE/Postal code: 2B220 /20218
- ^{1} French Land Register data, which excludes lakes, ponds, glaciers > 1 km^{2} (0.386 sq mi or 247 acres) and river estuaries.

Piedigriggio is a commune in the Haute-Corse department of France on the island of Corsica.

== Population ==
Historical population
Year	Pop.	±% p.a.
1968	108	—
1975	102	−0.81%
1982	119	+2.23%
1990	99	−2.27%
1999	124	+2.53%
2007	137	+1.25%
2012	145	+1.14%
2017	138	−0.98%
2023	164	+2.92%
Source: INSEE

== See also ==
- Communes of the Haute-Corse department
