= Gavignano, Haute-Corse =

Gavignano
- Commune
- Location of Gavignano
- Location within France Location within Corsica
- Coordinates: 42°25′08″N 9°17′16″E
- Country: France
- Region: Corsica
- Department: Haute-Corse
- Arrondissement: Corte
- Canton: Golo-Morosaglia
- Intercommunality: Pasquale Paoli

Government
  - Mayor (2020–2026): Gilles Pasqualini
- Area^{1}: 10.94 km^{2} (4.22 sq mi)
- Elevation: 700 m (2,300 ft)
- Highest elevation: 1,650 m (5,410 ft)
- Lowest elevation: 213 m (699 ft)
- Population (2023): 61
  - Density: 5.6/km^{2} (14/sq mi)
- Time zone: UTC+01:00 (CET)
  - Summer (DST): UTC+02:00 (CEST)
- INSEE/Postal code: 2B122 /20218
- ^{1} French Land Register data, which excludes lakes, ponds, glaciers > 1 km^{2} (0.386 sq mi or 247 acres) and river estuaries.

Gavignano (French pronunciation: [ɡaviɲano]; Corsican: Gavignanu) is a commune in the Haute-Corse department of France on the island of Corsica.

== Population ==
Historical population
Year	Pop.	±% p.a.
1968	97	—
1975	43	−10.97%
1982	42	−0.34%
1990	51	+2.46%
1999	55	+0.84%
2007	50	−1.18%
2012	39	−4.85%
2017	53	+6.33%
2023	61	+2.37%
Source: INSEE

== See also ==
- Communes of the Haute-Corse department
