= Corscia =

- Commune
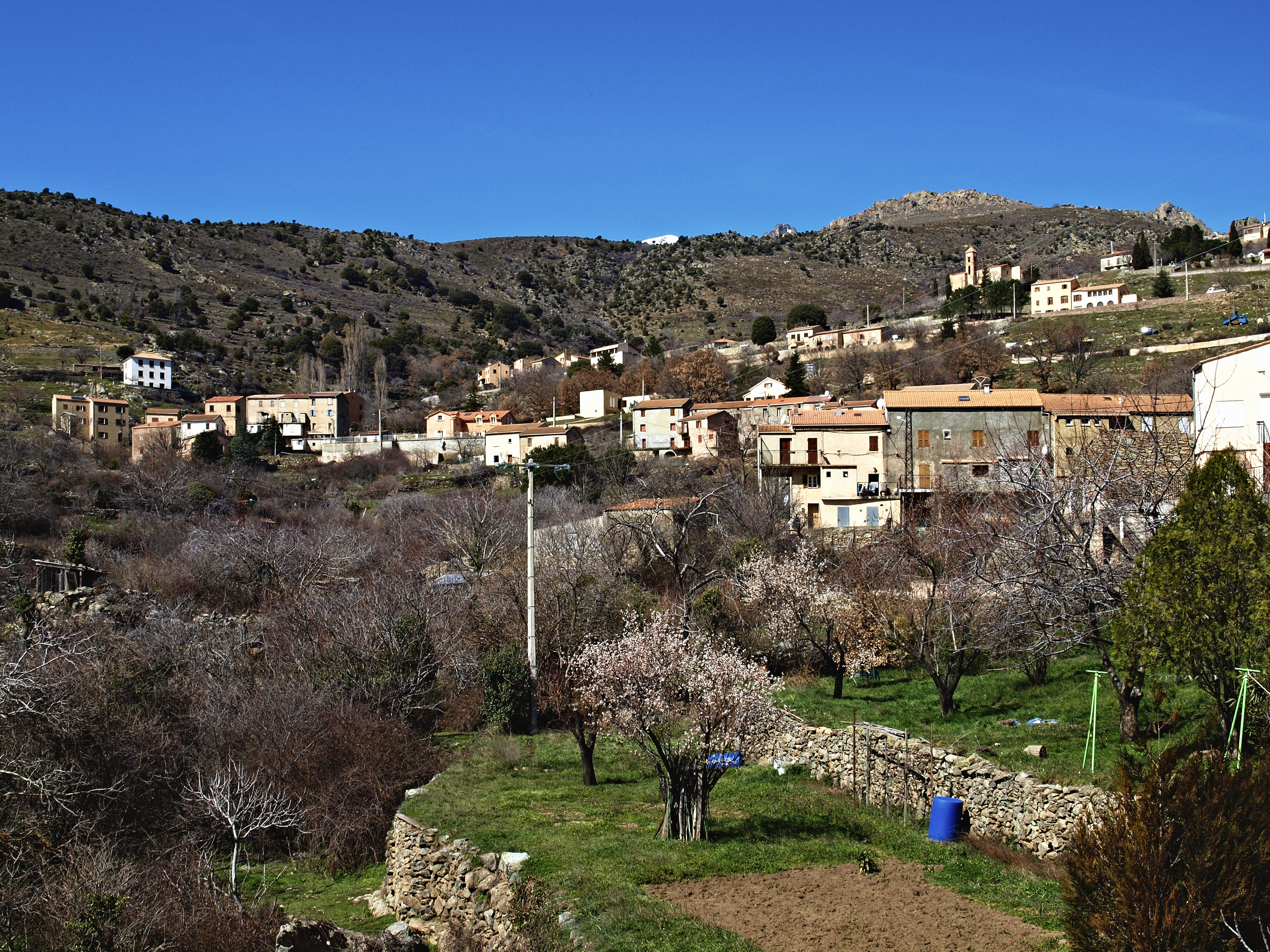
- A general view of Corscia
- Location of Corscia
- Location within France Location within Corsica
- Coordinates: 42°21′20″N 9°02′36″E
- Country: France
- Region: Corsica
- Department: Haute-Corse
- Arrondissement: Corte
- Canton: Golo-Morosaglia

Government
  - Mayor (2020–2026): Jean Félix Maestracci
- Area^{1}: 58.99 km^{2} (22.78 sq mi)
- Elevation: 837 m (2,746 ft)
- Highest elevation: 2,583 m (8,474 ft)
- Lowest elevation: 436 m (1,430 ft)
- Population (2023): 123
  - Density: 2.09/km^{2} (5.40/sq mi)
- Time zone: UTC+01:00 (CET)
  - Summer (DST): UTC+02:00 (CEST)
- INSEE/Postal code: 2B095 /20224
- ^{1} French Land Register data, which excludes lakes, ponds, glaciers > 1 km^{2} (0.386 sq mi or 247 acres) and river estuaries.

Corscia (French pronunciation: [kɔʁʃ(j)a]) is a commune in the Haute-Corse department of France on the island of Corsica. It contains the Corscia hydroelectric power station, which is fed by water channeled from Lac de Calacuccia and discharges into the Barrage de Corscia.

== Population ==
Historical population
Year	Pop.	±% p.a.
1968	290	—
1975	276	−0.70%
1982	260	−0.85%
1990	156	−6.19%
1999	155	−0.07%
2007	164	+0.71%
2012	166	+0.24%
2017	129	−4.92%
2023	123	−0.79%
Source: INSEE

== See also ==
- Communes of the Haute-Corse department
