= Campitello =

- Commune
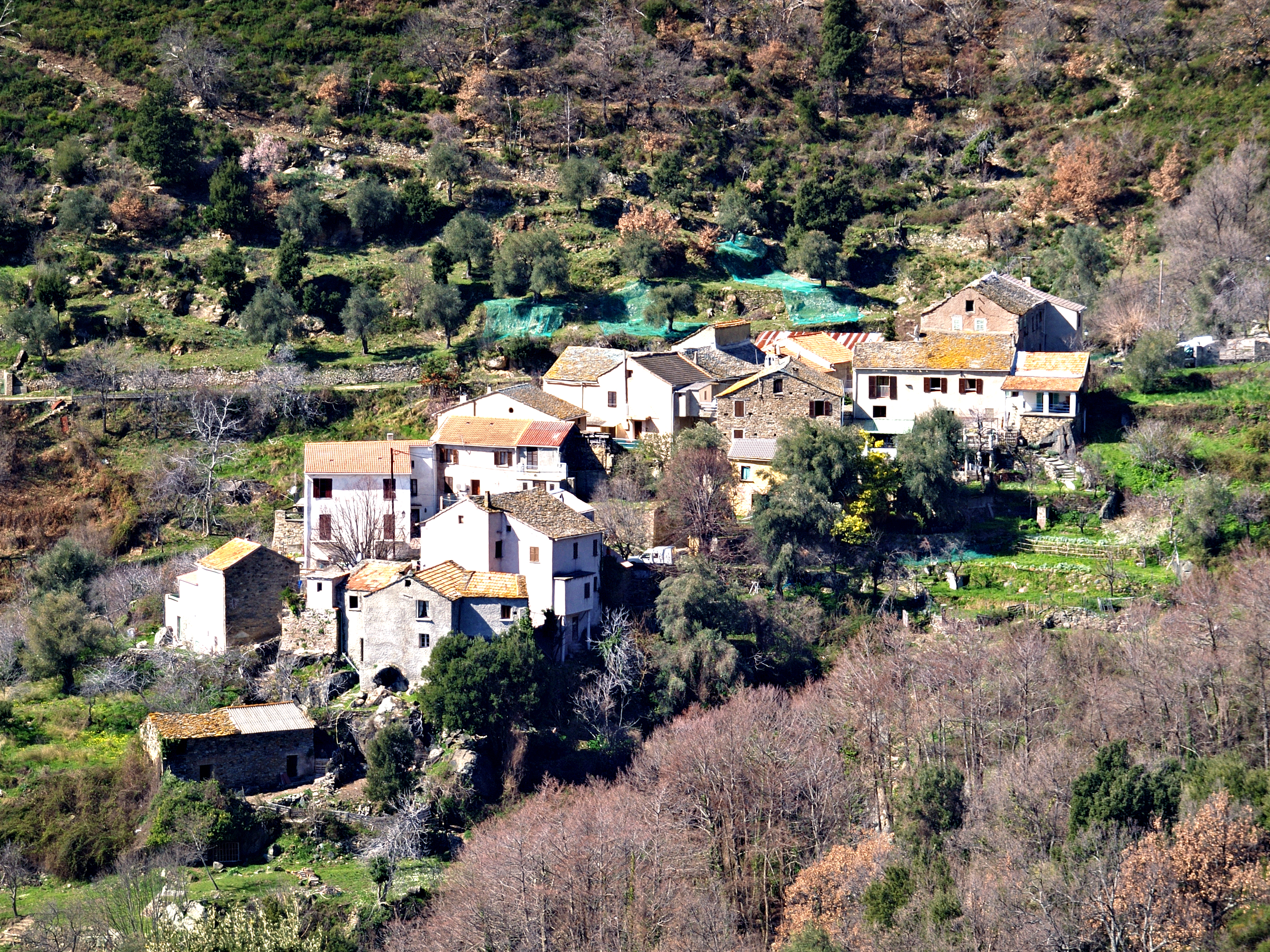
- The hamlet of Panicale, in Campitello
- Location of Campitello
- Location within France Location within Corsica
- Coordinates: 42°31′46″N 9°19′02″E
- Country: France
- Region: Corsica
- Department: Haute-Corse
- Arrondissement: Corte
- Canton: Golo-Morosaglia

Government
  - Mayor (2023–2026): Jean Mazzoni
- Area^{1}: 8.22 km^{2} (3.17 sq mi)
- Elevation: 500 m (1,600 ft)
- Highest elevation: 1,231 m (4,039 ft)
- Lowest elevation: 112 m (367 ft)
- Population (2023): 107
  - Density: 13.0/km^{2} (33.7/sq mi)
- Time zone: UTC+01:00 (CET)
  - Summer (DST): UTC+02:00 (CEST)
- INSEE/Postal code: 2B055 /20252
- ^{1} French Land Register data, which excludes lakes, ponds, glaciers > 1 km^{2} (0.386 sq mi or 247 acres) and river estuaries.

Campitello (Corsican: Campitellu) is a commune in the Haute-Corse department of France on the island of Corsica, in the Mediterranean Sea. It is located in A Custera. It is divided in 3 hamlets called: Progliolu, Bagnolu and Panicale.

== Population ==
Historical population
Year	Pop.	±% p.a.
1968	143	—
1975	119	−2.59%
1982	102	−2.18%
1990	91	−1.42%
1999	103	+1.39%
2007	101	−0.24%
2012	120	+3.51%
2017	119	−0.17%
2023	107	−1.76%
Source: INSEE

== See also ==
- Communes of the Haute-Corse department
