= Casaluna =

River in Haute-Corse, Corsica, France

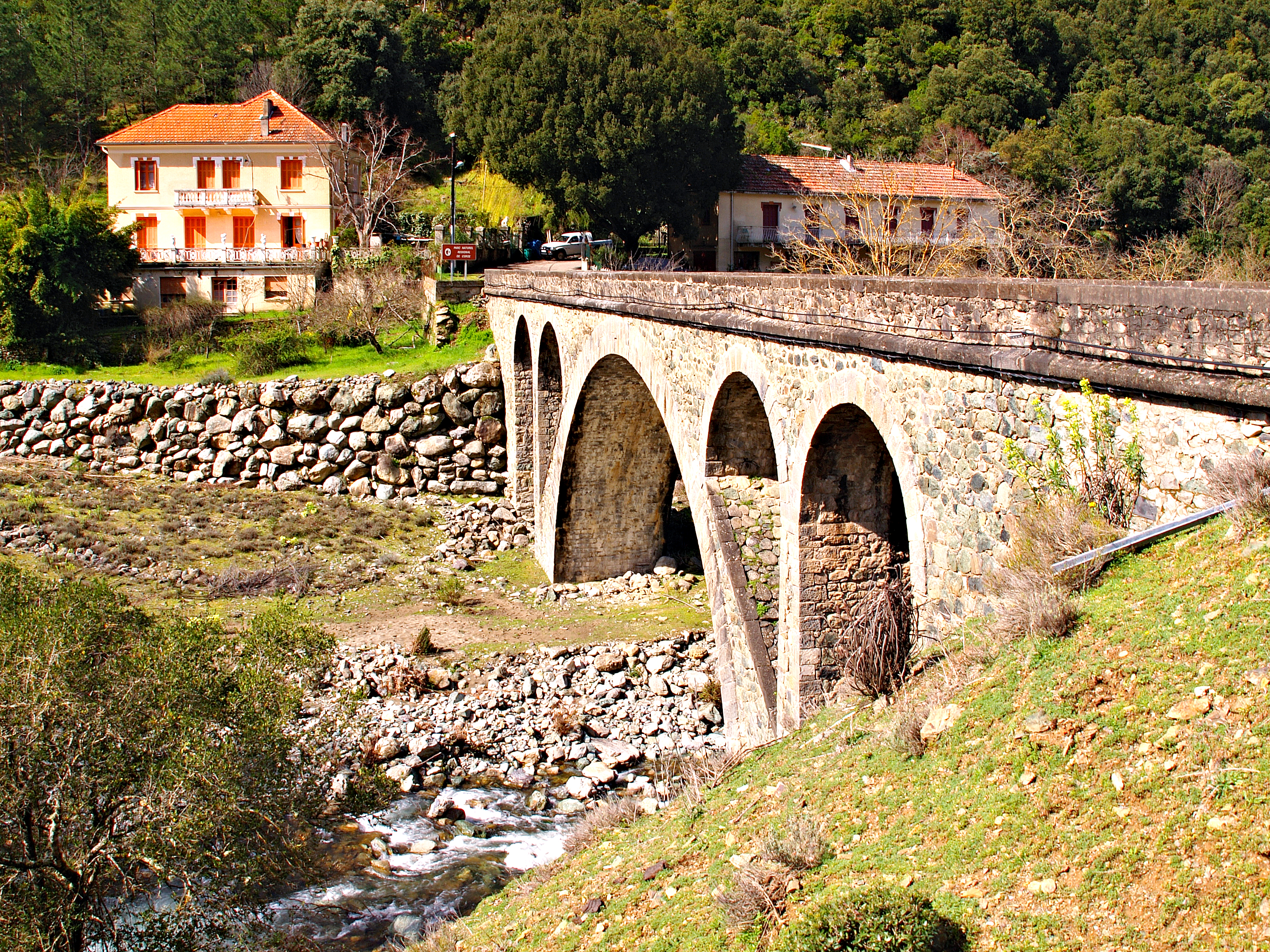
- Lano bridge

- Location within Corsica Location within France

Location
- Country: France
- Region: Corsica
- Department: Haute-Corse

Physical characteristics
- Mouth: Golo
  - coordinates: 42°26′42″N 9°12′06″E

Basin features
- Progression: Golo→ Tyrrhenian Sea

The Casaluna is a small river in the department of Haute-Corse, Corsica, France. It is a tributary of the Golo.

== Course ==
The Casaluna is 25.17 kilometres (15.64 mi) long. It crosses the communes of Aiti, Cambia, Carticasi, Castineta, Érone, Gavignano, Lano, Morosaglia, Saliceto and San-Lorenzo.

The Casaluna rises to the west of the 1,712 metres (5,617 ft) Monte Muffraje in the commune of Carticasi. Its source is at an altitude of 1,559 metres (5,115 ft). It flows with many meanders in a generally northwest direction to its confluence with the Golo to the south of Ponte Leccia. Its mouth is at an altitude of 207 metres (679 ft). In its lower course it defines the eastern boundary of the Forêt de Pineto.

== Bridge ==
On 24 November 2016 an exceptionally violent storm hit central Corsica and caused widespread flooding. An ice jam on the Casaluna river washed away a centuries-old bridge that spanned it. The bridge carried the D39 road over the lower Casaluna about 3 kilometres (1.9 mi) above its mouth. A temporary bridge was thrown over the river in mid-January 2017, but could not carry the heaviest vehicles. In May 2020 work on a permanent replacement was scheduled to begin. Although some of the local people wanted the old bridge to be rebuilt, that would be vulnerable to a similar storm, which was expected to become increasingly common as the climate changed. Instead a modern bridge was to be built in place of the old one. On 23 July 2020 a public inquiry was launched prior to environmental authorization of the project.

== Hydrology ==
The river's flow has been measured at Gavignano since 2013. The maximum instantaneous flow was 177 cubic metres per second (6,300 cu ft/s) on 16 March 2015. The maximum daily flow was 81.9 cubic metres per second (2,890 cu ft/s) on 2 October 2015.

== Tributaries ==
The following streams (ruisseaux) are tributaries of the Casaluna, ordered by length, and sub-tributaries:

- Prunitaccio 9 kilometres (5.6 mi)
  - Gavignaninco 6 kilometres (3.7 mi)
    - Paiarello 3 kilometres (1.9 mi)
    - Uscio a e Porte 2 kilometres (1.2 mi)
      - Casella 2 kilometres (1.2 mi)
  - Senichello 3 kilometres (1.9 mi)
    - Lago Maio 1 kilometre (0.62 mi)
    - Castineta 1 kilometre (0.62 mi)
    - Serena 1 kilometre (0.62 mi)
  - Panicale 2 kilometres (1.2 mi)
  - Mazzichelle 2 kilometres (1.2 mi)
  - Venato 2 kilometres (1.2 mi)
  - Padula 2 kilometres (1.2 mi)
  - Campo di Melo 2 kilometres (1.2 mi)
- Aninco 5 kilometres (3.1 mi)
  - Quercitello 4 kilometres (2.5 mi)
  - Canale 1 kilometre (0.62 mi)
- Mangani 4 kilometres (2.5 mi)
  - Guadella 1 kilometre (0.62 mi)
  - Cerio 1 kilometre (0.62 mi)
- Sarbaio 4 kilometres (2.5 mi)
  - Cotero 2 kilometres (1.2 mi)
- Calcinaju 4 kilometres (2.5 mi)
  - Busincu 2 kilometres (1.2 mi)
    - Vituste 1 kilometre (0.62 mi)
- Ombriato 3 kilometres (1.9 mi)
  - Ponticello 4 kilometres (2.5 mi)
    - Forci 2 kilometres (1.2 mi)
    - Olivacce 1 kilometre (0.62 mi)
- Fossa Ceca 3 kilometres (1.9 mi)
- Funtana 2 kilometres (1.2 mi)
- Ripe Rosse 2 kilometres (1.2 mi)
- Scandulajola 2 kilometres (1.2 mi)
- Tenneri 2 kilometres (1.2 mi)
- Malerso 2 kilometres (1.2 mi)
- Vecchiale 2 kilometres (1.2 mi)
- Pindagliole 2 kilometres (1.2 mi)
- Pruenca 2 kilometres (1.2 mi)
- Mufrage 1 kilometre (0.62 mi)
- Turlone 1 kilometre (0.62 mi)
- Valdo 1 kilometre (0.62 mi)

== Sources ==
- Giacobbi, Paul François (8 October 2020), Travaux de reconstruction du pont de la Casaluna (PDF) (in French), Collectivité de Corse
- "La Casaluna à Gavignano", eaufrance (in French), Ministère de l'Ecologie, du Développement Durable et de l'Energie, archived from the original on 2011-03-01
- "La Casaluna", Sandre (in French)
- Quilichini, Morgane (15 May 2020), "Centre-corse : les travaux du pont de Casaluna débutent en fin d'année", Corse Matin (in French)
- "Relation: La Casaluna (8474340)", OpenStreetMap
