= Col de Prato =

Mountain pass in Corsica, France

- Bocca di u Pratu (Corsican)
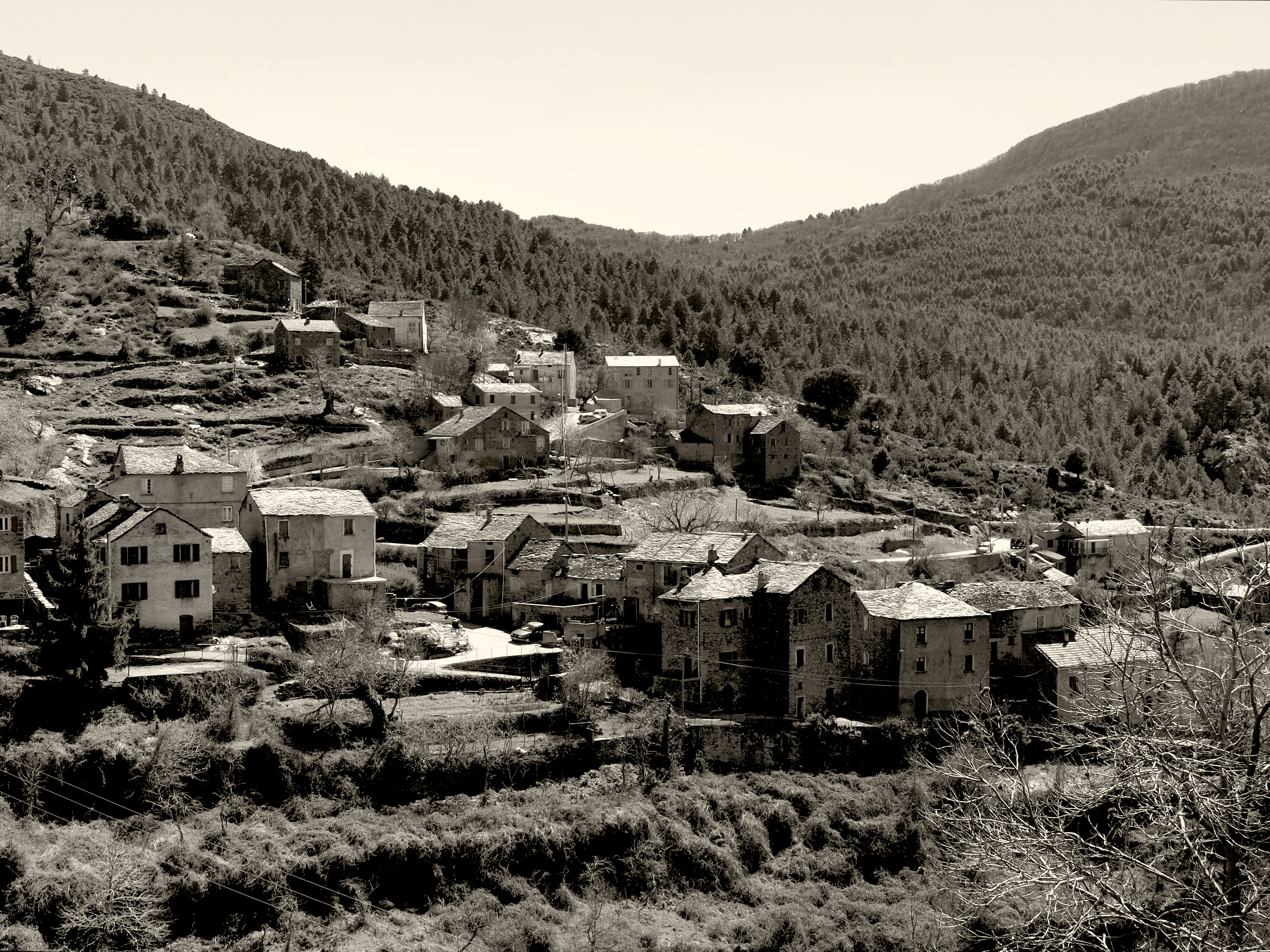
- The hamlets of Terchini and Colle on the climb to the Prato pass

- Location within Corsica Location within France
- Elevation: 985 metres (3,232 ft)

Third Approach
- Range: Monte San Petrone
- Coordinates: 42°25′39″N 9°19′53″E

The Col de Prato (Corsican: Bocca di u Pratu) is a mountain pass in the Haute-Corse department of Corsica, France.

== Location ==
The pass is at an elevation of 985 metres (3,232 ft). It is in the Monte San Petrone Massif, to the north of the 1,767 metres (5,797 ft) Monte San Petrone. The D71 road from Morosaglia to the northwest runs through the pass and continues south and then east to the coast near Valle-di-Campoloro.

It crosses between the valley of the Casaluna, a tributary of the Golo, and the valley of the Fium'Alto. The Ruisseau de Campo di Melo rises on its western side. This flows into the Ruisseau de Conca (called the Prunitaccio downstream), a tributary of the Casaluna. The Ruisseau de Lavatoio et de Noceta rises on the eastern side of the pass, which successively joins with other streams before ending up in the Fium’Alto.

== Geology ==
The Prato Pass is located in the "Alpine Corsica" composed of glazed shales and green rocks (ophiolites), on the ridge of the Monte San Petrone Massif. "South of Quercitello is the Prato Pass (altitude 974 m.); there is a quarry there in a gray, phyllite limestone, giving a good stone for paving roads. This limestone is in the lens state at the top of the white mica shales; the benches slope to the west. These shale sediments with limestone banks exist between the Prato Pass and Morosaglia where they are sometimes cut by gabbro-serpentine veins."

== Sources ==
- "Col de Prato", Géoportail (in French)
- Hollande, D. (January 1917), "Géologie de la Corse", Bulletin de la Société des Sciences historiques et naturelles de la Corse, Veuve Ollagnier Bastia
- "Node: Col de Prato (2825400235)", OpenStreetMap
- "Ruisseau de Campo di Melo", Sandre (in French)
- "Ruisseau de Lavatoio et de Noceta", Sandre (in French)
- "Ruisseau de Prunitaccio", Sandre (in French)
