= Col de San Quilico =

Mountain pass in Corsica, France

- Bocca di San Quilicu (Corsican)
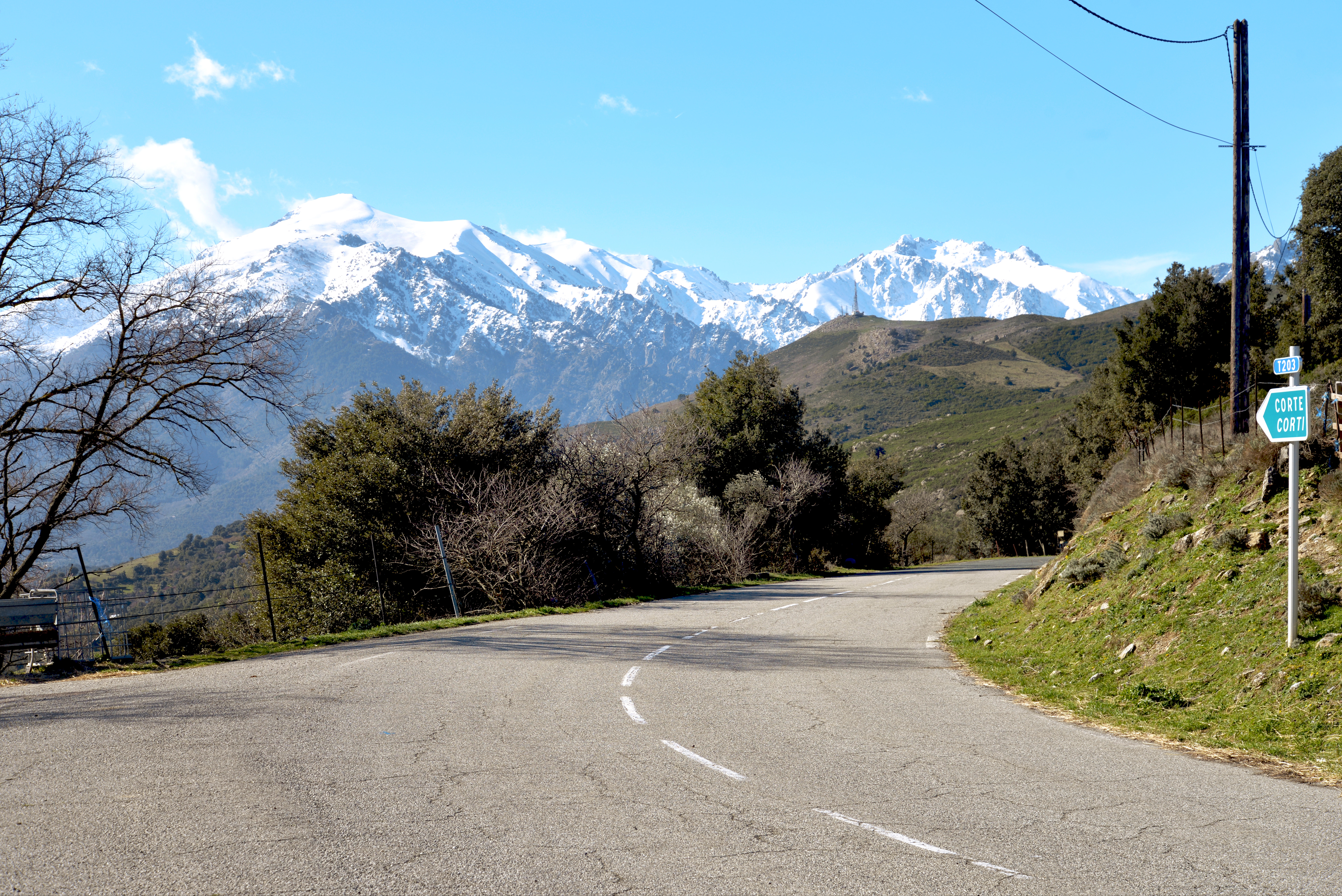
- View of the pass

- Location within Corsica Location within France
- Elevation: 559 metres (1,834 ft)

First Approach
- Length: 16.3 kilometres (10.1 mi)
- Traversed by: T20/T203
- Ascent from: Golo valley (north) Ponte-Leccia

Second Approach
- Length: 7.7 kilometres (4.8 mi)
- Traversed by: T20/T203
- Ascent from: Tavignano valley (south) Corte

Third Approach
- Range: Monte San Petrone Massif
- Coordinates: 42°20′52″N 9°10′24″E

The Col de San Quilico or collo di San Quilico (Corsican: Bocca di San Quilicu) is a mountain pass in the Haute-Corse department of Corsica, France. It is a road pass on Territorial Route 20, between Corte and Ponte Leccia (Morosaglia).

== Location ==
The Col de San Quilico is a saddle between the mountains that separate Soveria in the north from Tralonca in the south. These municipalities are in the Regional Natural Park of Corsica, in its "territory of life" called Centru di Corsica.

== Topography ==
The Col de San Quilico is located at an altitude of 559 metres (1,834 ft) below the ridge line of a mountain range oriented from west to east, connecting the 1,951 metres (6,401 ft) Pinerole to the west to the 1,473 metres (4,833 ft) Punta di l'Ernella to the east. The ridge runs through via the Lorca territorial forest and may also be crossed by the 654 metres (2,146 ft) Bocca d'Ominanda and the 811 metres (2,661 ft) Pinzalaccio. A large part of the ridge line defines the border between the municipalities of Soveria and Tralonca.

The section of the mountain range holding the San Quilico pass divides the central depression or furrow of the island into two zones:

- to the north, the Ponte-Leccia basin;
- to the south, the Cortenais.

The Col de San Quilico connects the Golo valley, Bastia and the Balagne region to the north, with the Centre Corse (Centru di Corsica) to the south, the Tavignano valley and the east coast of the island, and (beyond the Col de Vizzavona) to Ajaccio and the west coast.

In the immediate environment are:

- to the north, the valley of the Ruisseau de Forcalello (or Ruisseau de Santa Maria, as it is called further downstream), a tributary of the Ruisseau de Sumano, a tributary of the Golo river;
- to the south, the valley of the Ruisseau de San Quilico (or Ruisseau de Bistuglio), a tributary of the Tavignano river near the town of Corte.

On the northern slope, the plant cover is made up of groves of holm oaks and cork oaks, more verdant than on the south side, where only low and sparse maquis grows.

== History ==
San Quilico is a road pass where the N 193 and D41 roads meet. It owes its name to a sanctuary further north in the town of Soveria.

In the 1880s, a railway tunnel 500 meters long was bored at an average altitude of 495 metres (1,624 ft) under the pass as part of the new Ajaccio – Bastia line, removing the obstacle of San Quilico.

In 1996, the Corte diversion was created. In 1998–1999, a 280 metres (920 ft) road tunnel was drilled under the San Quilico pass, above the railway tunnel, for the new route of the former national road 193. The “Restaurant du Col” at the pass had to close its doors.

In 2002, the new Corte - Soveria link was opened to traffic, including a tunnel and straightening of the tortuous section passing through Bistuglio and the San Quilico pass.

On January 30, 2014, the former national road 193 passing through the pass officially took the name of T203. It become a ramp to territorial road 20 which serves the hamlet of Bistuglio. The first section of the D41 road at the pass remains, despite the opening of a new access to it 300 metres (980 ft) after the southern exit of the road tunnel.

== Sources ==
- "Collo di San Quilico", Géoportail (in French)
- Feracci, Antoine, "Le train à Corte Ce ne fut pas facile…", Corti d'Eri, Agence Neuromediasoft
- "Ruisseau de Bistuglio", Sandre (in French)
- "Ruisseau de Santa Maria", Sandre (in French)
- "Ruisseau de Sumano", Sandre (in French)
