= Loriani =

Village in Corsica, France

Coordinates: 42°22′08″N 9°17′57″E

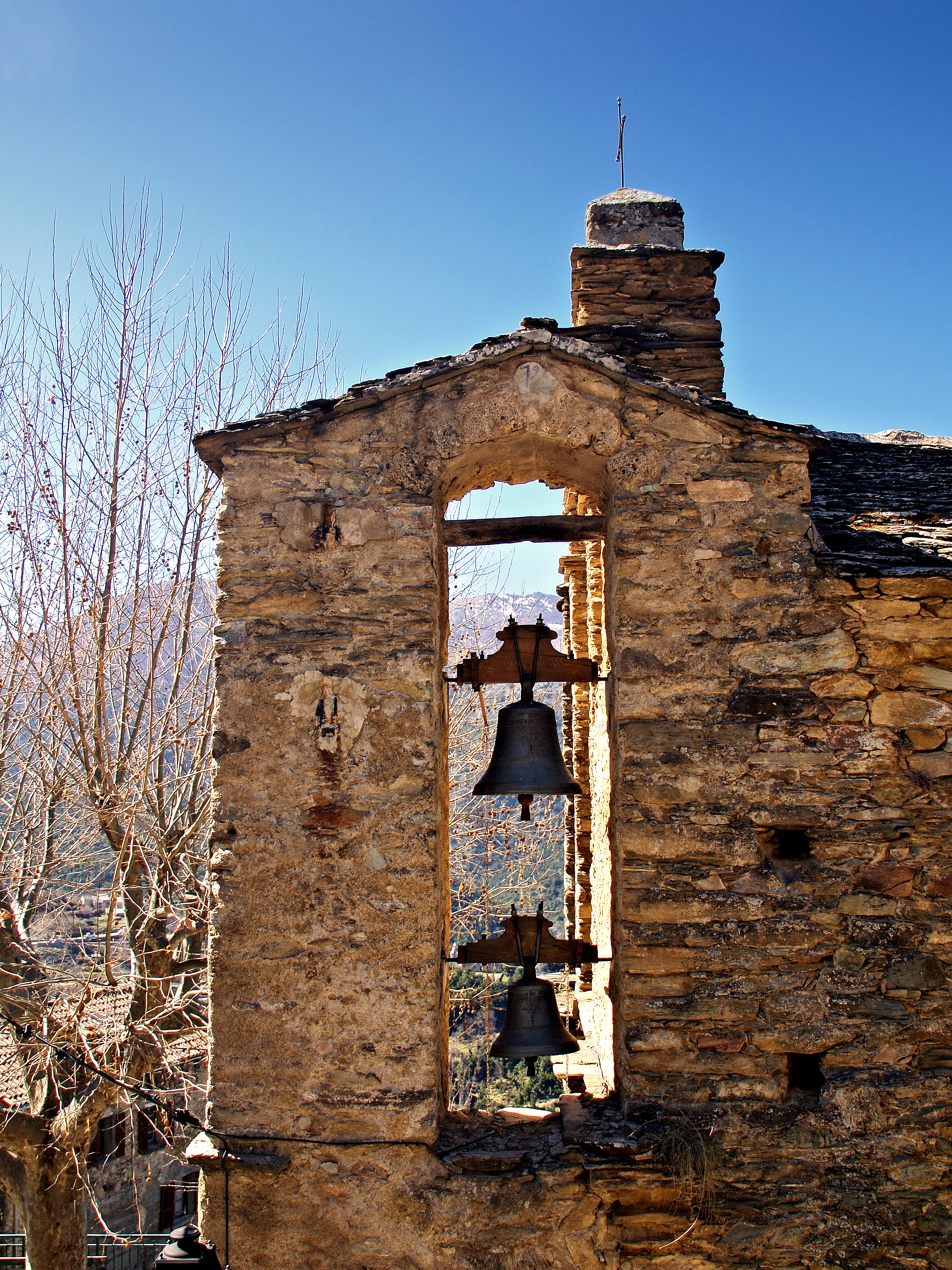
- The Church of Santa Catalina

Loriani is a hamlet in the commune of Cambia in the department of Haute-Corse, in Corsica, France. Other hamlets in Cambia include Cambia, Corsoli/Corsuli, and San Quilico/San Chilicu.

== Geography ==
Loriani is located in the parish of Vallerustie, in the Castagniccia region at the foot of Monte San Petrone, about forty kilometers from Corte/Corti. To get there, take the RN 193 then the road to San-Lorenzo/Sa Lurenzu (two kilometers before Francardu), turn left at the Lanu bridge.

== Notable people ==
- Pace Maria Falconetti, a hero of the resistance against the French invasion of Corsica in 1768. He fought with Pascal Paoli at Ponte-Novo, fled to Italy after the defeat of 9 May 1769, and then returned to try to raise the Niolins against France. He was captured and imprisoned at the prison of Toulon where he died among rats and vermin. There were other patriots from Loriani who fought with the Babbu (Paoli), such as his brother Jean Benoit and the Bernardini brothers who were tortured on the wheel, and Vincensini Don Gio, who died in the battle of Ponte-Novo at 20 years old.
- Paul Vincensini French poet and teacher, lived in Loriani; some of his ashes are deposited in the family cemetery.
- Paul Vincensini. The technical high school of Bastia in Montesoro is named after Paul Vincensini, a mathematics teacher from Loriani

== Notable buildings ==
=== The Church of Santa-Catalina ===
A sixteenth century religious building, in stone, schist and rubble. In the small niche above the porch, the statuette of Sainte-Catherine the patron saint.
