= Col Saint-Antoine (Corsica) =

Mountain pass in Corsica, France

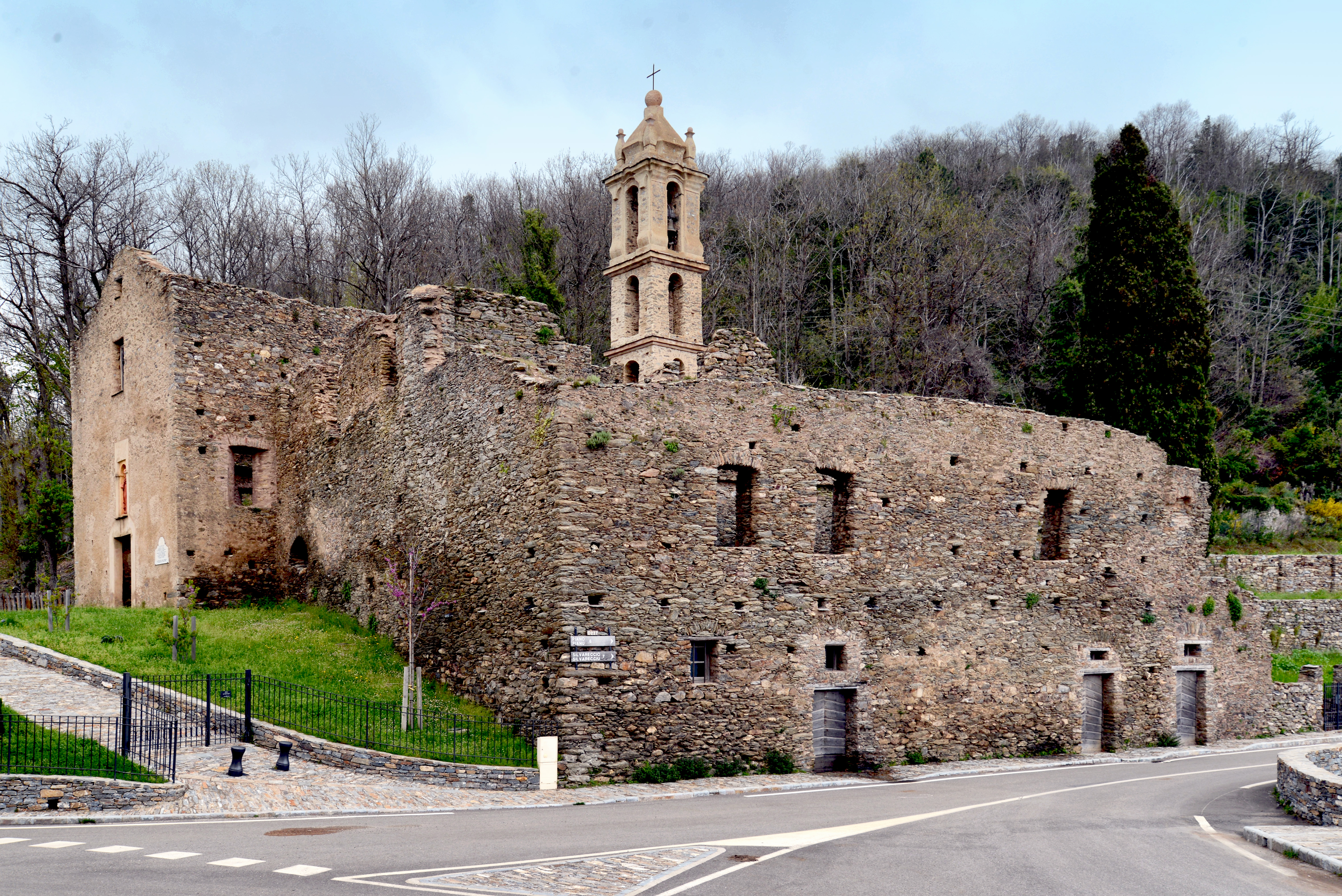
- Ruins of the former Saint-Antoine convent at the pass

- Location within Corsica Location within France
- Elevation: 687 metres (2,254 ft)
- Ascent from: Volpajola, La Porta

Third Approach
- Range: Monte San Petrone Massif
- Coordinates: 42°27′07″N 9°21′48″E

The Col Saint-Antoine (Corsican: Bocca di Sant'Antone), or Saint-Antoine Pass, is a mountain pass in the Haute-Corse department of Corsica, France. It is one of the main passes in the island of Corsica. It rises to 687 metres (2,254 ft).

== Location and topography ==
The Col Saint-Antoine is located in the Monte San Petrone Massif, a chain of medium-sized schist mountains in the northeast of the island, north of the Castagniccia region. It is located west of the municipality of Casabianca, about 8 kilometres (5.0 mi) north-northeast of Monte San Petrone. It is located at 687 metres (2,254 ft) above sea level, on the crest line of a secondary ridge containing the 1,230 metres (4,040 ft) Punta di San Paolo on the main chain of the Monte San Petrone Massif, and oriented towards the east towards the 1,218 metres (3,996 ft) Monte Sant'Angelo. Col Saint-Antoine provides a passage through steep valleys from Casacconi in the lower valley of the Golo river in the north-west to Ampugnani in the east.

To the north of the pass, at a distance of about 380 metres (1,250 ft) in the municipality of Ortiporio, is the Ruisseau Filetto Piano, a tributary of the Ruisseau Piano, a tributary of the Ruisseau de Casacconi, which joins the Golo in Barchetta. To the south is the Fontanelle ravine in which there is an unnamed stream that feeds the Ruisseau de Molaghina, a tributary of the Ruisseau de Pozzo Bianco, in turn a tributary of the Fium'Alto river.

== Geology ==
The site is in "Eastern Alpine Corsica". It is formed here by the strongly displaced terrain of Castagniccia, composed of lustrous schists and ophiolites that form the eastern reliefs of the island.

== Weather ==
The pass is rarely snow covered in winter; it is practicable all year round. The strong westerly winds which prevail further north on the Cap Corse range are hardly felt.

== Flora and fauna ==
The pass was frequented ten years ago in October by hunters of migrating wood pigeons.

The site is located in the heart of “petite Castagniccia”, an area covered with arborescent vegetation dominated by chestnut trees, most often in the form of orchards or coppices, with holm oaks.

== Access ==
Col Saint-Antoine is at the crossroads of the roads:

- D15, which connects Volpajola to the pass itself;
- D515, which connects Barchetta on RT 20 (ex-RN 193) to La Porta and beyond to Nocario;
- D237, which connects the pass to Torra-Vescovato on the RT 10 (ex-RN 198).

== History ==
The ruins of the former Convent of Saint-Antoine de Casabianca are in the pass. This is a historic landmark for the Corsican nation, listed as a Historic Monument. Numerous national consultations (or assemblies) were held there. At one on 15 July 1755 Pasquale Paoli was proclaimed general of the kingdom of Corsica.

== Sources ==
- "Carte IGN classique", Géoportail (in French)
- "Couvent Saint-Antoine", POP : la plateforme ouverte du patrimoine (in French), Ministère de la Culture
- "ZNIEFF 940004146 Chataigneraies de la Petite Castagniccia", Inventaire national du patrimoine naturel (INPN) (in French), MNHN & OFB, 2003–2021
