= Chapelle San Quilico de Cambia =

Romanesque chapel in Haute-Corse, France

Chapelle San Quilico
- San Chirgu
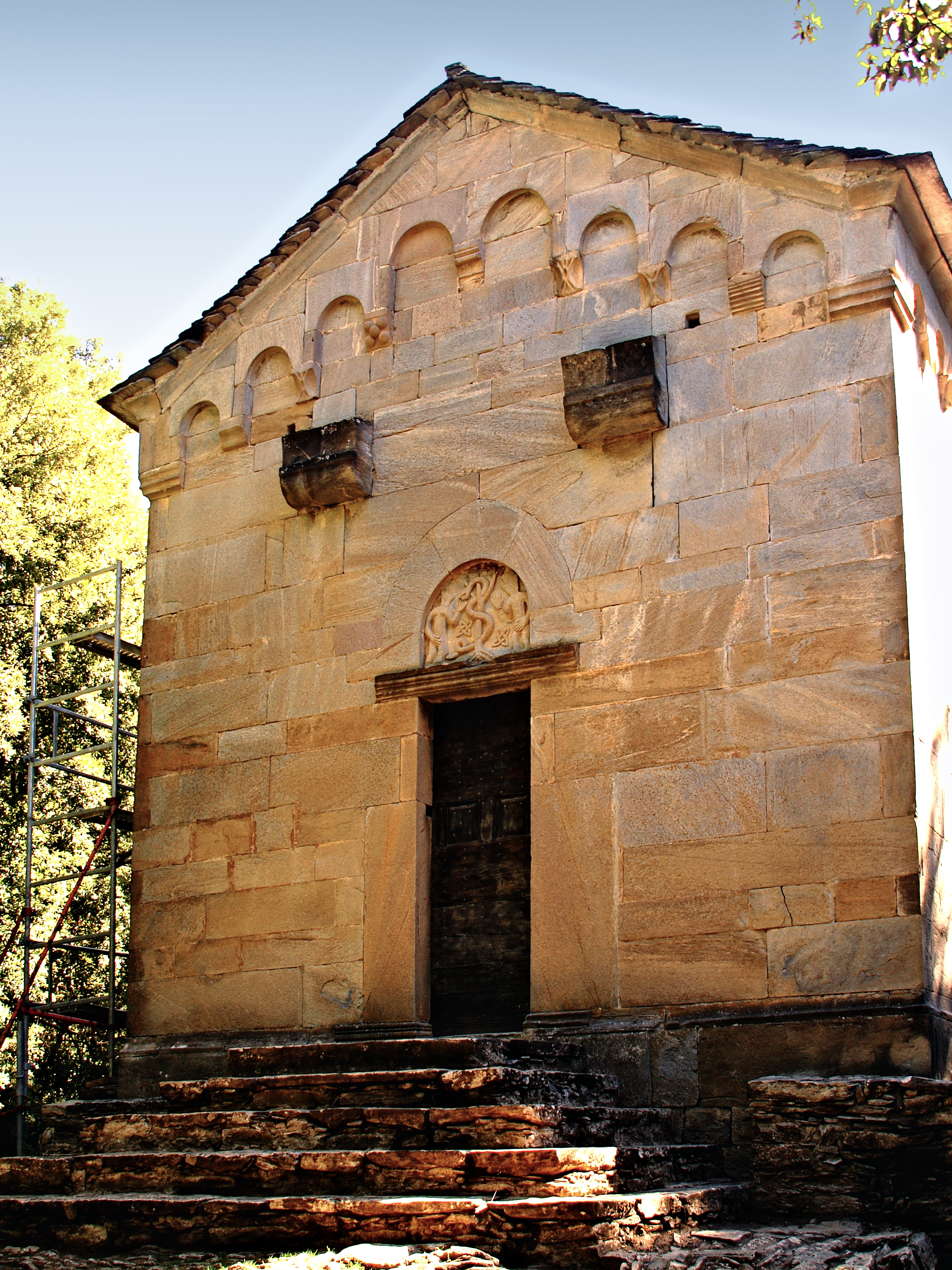
- San Quilicu chapel
- Chapelle San Quilico
- 42.37911°N 9.29286°E
- Location: Haute-Corse
- Address: Cambia
- Country: France
- Denomination: Roman Catholic

Architecture
- Architectural type: Pisan
- Style: Romanesque
- Years built: c. 14th century

Administration
- Benefice: Commune of Cambia

San Quilico (also known in Corsican: San Quìlicu or San Chirgu and French: Saint Cyr) is a chapel located in the village of Cambia, department of Haute-Corse in France.

== Historic monument classification ==
San Chirgu is a Romanesque religious building, classified as a historical monument since June 15, 1976, under the official name of Church of San Quilicu.

== Situation ==
San Quilico was located in the former parish of Vallerustie, in the diocese of Aléria. It is now located in the municipality of Cambia, at 745m, below the hamlet of San Quilico, and with a nearly 500m orthodromic distance from the chapel of Santa Maria built at the same time.

== Description ==
Characteristic of the architectural principles of Pisan Romanesque art, the 13th-century chapel of San Quilico de Cambia was probably remodeled around 1453-1496. It is a small building constructed of ochre schist slabs and covered with schist tiles. Bas-reliefs, on the tympanums display the temptation of Eve, and a man slaying a serpent, with the arches being decorated in a interlacing pattern of voussoirs. Inside the chapel, frescoes display Christ and God the Father, alongside other figures.

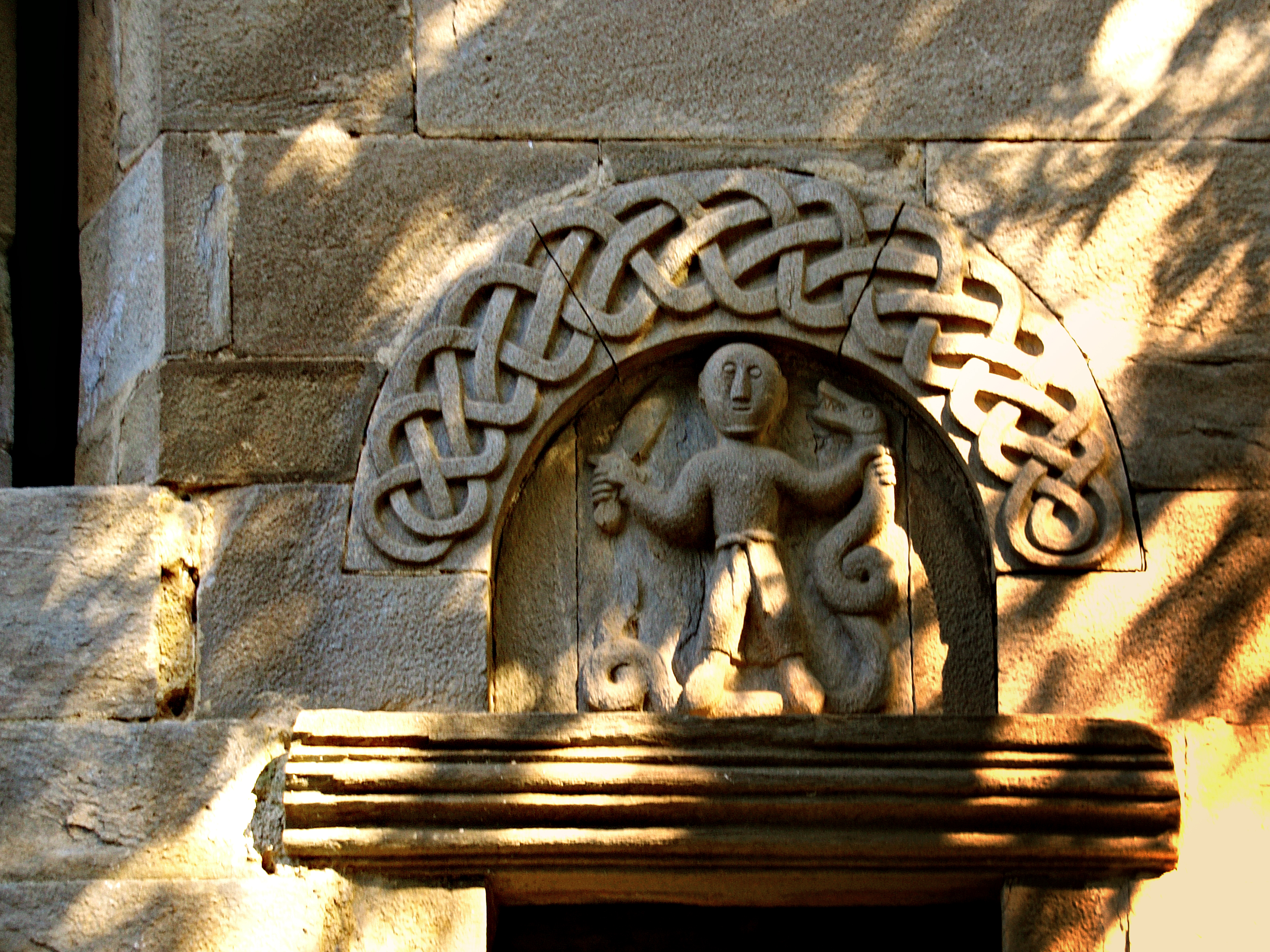
Tympanum of the south side door.

The church of Santa Maria de Cambia is similar, but with less decoration. Local oral tradition holds that the two chapels were constructed at the same time, one by the father and one by the son. Geneviève Moracchini-Mazel confirms that they were certainly built at the same time.

== See also ==
=== Related articles ===
- Cambia, Haute-Corse
- Statue-menhir of Santa Maria

=== External links ===
- Resource relating to architecture : French national heritage platform
