= Cambia, Haute-Corse =

Cambia
- Commune
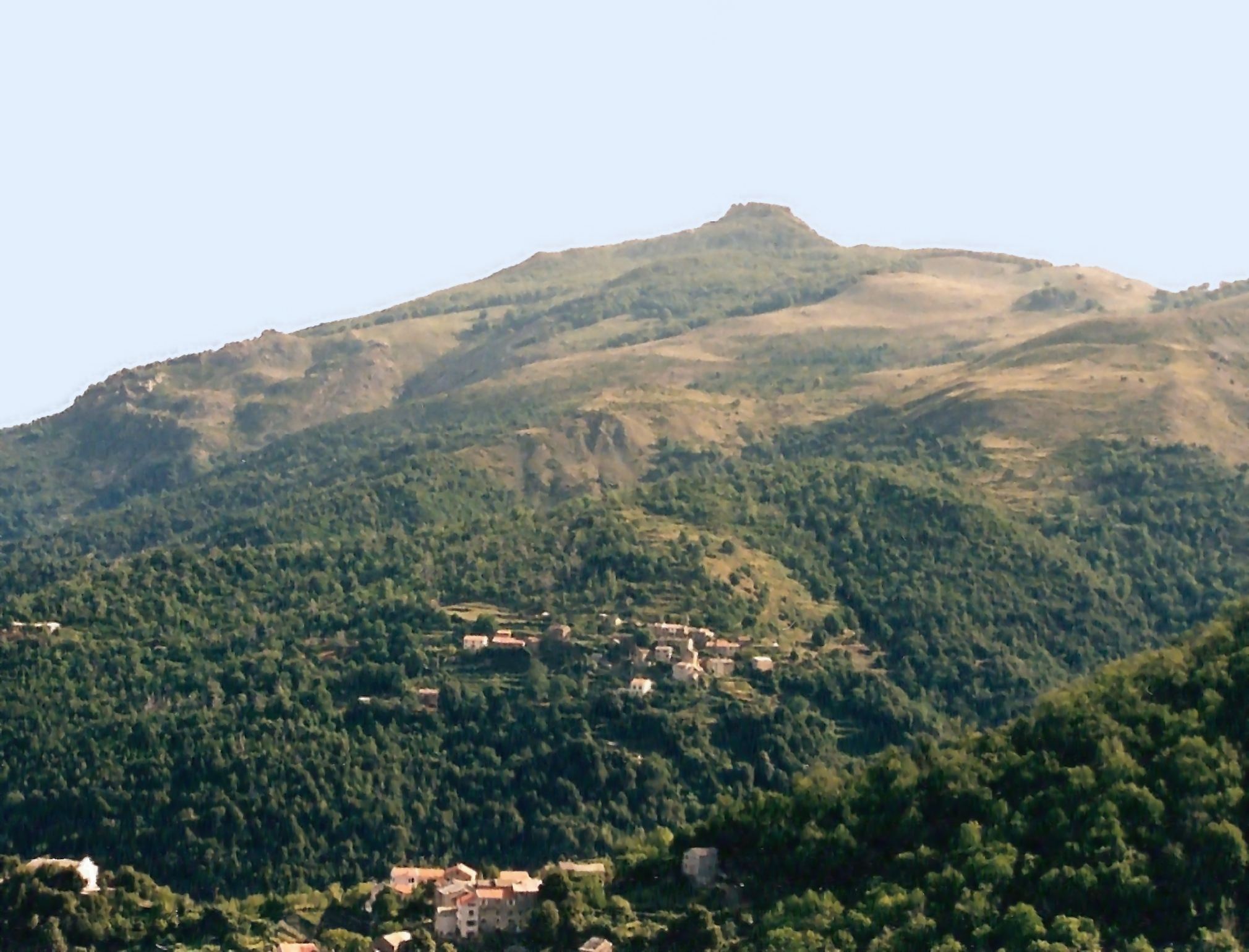
- Mount San Petrone and the villages of Cambia and Loriani, in Cambia
- Location of Cambia
- Location within France Location within Corsica
- Coordinates: 42°21′51″N 9°17′38″E
- Country: France
- Region: Corsica
- Department: Haute-Corse
- Arrondissement: Corte
- Canton: Golo-Morosaglia
- Intercommunality: Pasquale Paoli

Government
  - Mayor (2020–2026): Nicolas Saliceti
- Area^{1}: 8.28 km^{2} (3.20 sq mi)
- Elevation: 765 m (2,510 ft)
- Highest elevation: 1,421 m (4,662 ft)
- Lowest elevation: 510 m (1,670 ft)
- Population (2023): 61
  - Density: 7.4/km^{2} (19/sq mi)
- Time zone: UTC+01:00 (CET)
  - Summer (DST): UTC+02:00 (CEST)
- INSEE/Postal code: 2B051 /20244
- ^{1} French Land Register data, which excludes lakes, ponds, glaciers > 1 km^{2} (0.386 sq mi or 247 acres) and river estuaries.

Cambia is a commune in the Haute-Corse department of France on the island of Corsica. It includes the villages of Cambia, Loriani, Corsoli, and San Quilico.

== Geography ==
=== Situation ===
Cambia is a commune in the interior of Corsica, located in the pieve of Valerustia, in Castagniccia, at the foot of the western slope of the Monte San Petrone and at the limit of Corsica regional natural park.Cambia is in the upper valley of the Casaluna.

==== Bordering municipalities ====
Cambia is surrounded by the municipalities of: San Lorenzo north, Pie-d’orezza east, Carticasi south, Rusio to the southwest, Erone west

=== Geology and relief ===
The commune is located in eastern Corsica where schists dominate, which geologists usually distinguish from ancient western Corsica, made up mainly of granite rocks. It is located on the edge of the central depression which separates them, a narrow furrow with softened relief made up mainly of secondary and tertiary sedimentary terrains, which cuts the island from the northwest to the southeast, from Ostriconi to Solenzara.

Its highest peak is Testa di Catarello (1,428 m), "straddling" the communes of Pie-d’orezza, Carticasi and Cambia, on the ridge of the shale massif Monte San Petrone. . With Punta Ventosa (1,421 m) the other high peak "straddling" on Pie-d’orezza, San Lorenzo and Cambia, they mark the eastern limits of the commune. Between the two peaks, a cave at Bocca al Prato (1,296 m).

Cambia occupies two steep valleys, those of the Ombriato streams to the north, and Sarbaio to the south, two tributaries (RD) of the river Casaluna. This largely delimits its territory to the west.

=== Hydrography ===
There Casaluna cross the town. It receives the waters of the two tributaries on the right bank, the Sarbaio streams and Ombriato. .The Biligato stream has its source under Testa di Catarello. It takes the name of Sarbiao stream downstream, the course of which passes between the village of Cambia and Loriani its hamlet. The Ombriato stream originates at nearly 1,150 m in the town under the name of Mandriolo stream, under the eponymous place. It separates the hamlets of Corsoli and San Quilico.

=== Climate and vegetation ===
The climate is mild overall, tempered by the action of the Mediterranean Sea which is not far away and the ridges of the ridge of the San Petrone. It is characterized by significant sunshine and relatively high rainfall in autumn and February–March. Drought hits the area during the summer months.

The town is very wooded. Although found in the Castagniccia (which takes its name from the forest of chestnut trees covering her territory), she is dressed mainly in holm oaks .However, the land and exposure of the municipality make it a particularly favorable terroir for planting varieties of chestnut trees, which are famous throughout Castagniccia for the high fructose content of their fruits.

=== Communication routes and transport ===
==== Road access ====
Cambia is approximately forty kilometers from Corti.

To get there, take the RN 193, then the road D 39 of San Lurenzu two kilometers after Francardu (Omessa) coming from Corti and cross the bridge Golo. . At the bridge level Lanu (Pont'à Lanu) continue there D 39 taking a left. In San Lorenzo, take the D 15, road connecting the Casaluna at Bozio.

The hamlets of Loriani and San Quilico are accessible by paved municipal roads.

==== Transportation ====
There is no passenger transport service in Cambia. The closest train station is that of Francardo. The closest ports and airports are Bastia Port and Bastia Poretta.

== Urban planning ==
=== Typology ===
At as of 1 January 2024, Cambia is categorized as a rural commune with very dispersed housing, according to the new seven-level municipal density grid defined by INSEE in 2022. .It is located outside the urban unit. Furthermore, the municipality is part of the Bastia attraction area, of which it is a municipality in the crown.This area, which brings together 93 municipalities, is categorized into areas of 50,000 to less than 200,000 inhabitants.

=== Land use ===
The land use of the municipality, as it emerges from the database European occupation biophysics floors Corine Land Cover (CLC), is marked by the importance of forests and semi-natural environments (100% in 2018), a proportion identical to that of 1990 (100%). The detailed distribution in 2018 is as follows: forests (78.1%), environments with shrub and/or herbaceous vegetation (21.9%). . . The evolution of the land use of the municipality and its infrastructures can be observed on the different cartographic representations of the territory: the Cassini map (XVIII^{e} century), the staff card (1820-1866) and maps or aerial photos of the IGN for the current period (1950 to present).

=== Cambia ===
- Pronunciation: ['kãm:bja].
- Nice: Cambinchi.

Village where the town hall is located, and whose name provides the current politonym. This name gradually replaced that of Corsuli, to designate all four communities.

=== Corsoli ===
- Pronunciation: the emphasis is on the first syllable with therefore a very open vowel [o] (['ko:ʀsulɪ]).
- Kind: Corsulacci.

This village was once the most important and best-known town. It was a capital (lieutenancy) during the feudal era. Then for a long time, his name (according to the texts: Corsuli, Corsoli, Cursuli, or Cusuli) was still used to designate the area, or even part of the pieve.

The pudestà (podestat elected official) of Corsuli was one of the most important of the Vallerustie pieve. We also measure the notoriety that this village once had, by the use made of its toponym, as a reference known throughout Corsica. So many historical figures from the pieve (whatever the hamlets from which they really originated) are designated by their first name followed by the name of the town (main or best known), that is to say ‘’Corsoli’’.

=== San Quilico ===
- Pronunciation: [,sã'ki:ʀɢu].

The village of San Shirgu perches on a ridge overlooking Corsuli. He kept, for his name, the title from the chapel: Capella di San Chirgu. This title corresponds in French to Saint Cyr. The first name (common in the region) is commonly translated into French as "Quilicus". Formerly, in written language, the name of the church was logically translated into Tuscan as "Santo Quilico" [,sãnto'kwi:lɪɢo].

=== Loriani ===
Main article: Loriani.

- Pronunciation: [lo'ʀjã:nɪ].
- Nice: Lorianinchi and Lorianacci.

The village clings to the slopes of the Monte San Petrone.

== Population ==
=== Demography ===
The evolution of the number of inhabitants is known through the population censuses carried out in the municipality since 1800. For municipalities with less than 10 000 inhabitants, a census survey covering the entire population is carried out every five years, while the reference populations of the intermediate years are estimated by interpolation or extrapolation.[] For the municipality, the first comprehensive census under the new scheme was carried out in 2008]

In 2023, the municipality had 61 inhabitants, a decrease −23.75 % compared to 2017 (Upper Corsica: +5.34%, France excluding Mayotte: +2.36%).

Historical population
Year	Pop.	±% p.a.
1968	116	—
1975	89	−3.71%
1982	80	−1.51%
1990	81	+0.16%
1999	79	−0.28%
2007	75	−0.65%
2012	86	+2.77%
2017	80	−1.44%
2023	61	−4.42%
Source: INSEE

== Local culture and heritage ==
=== Places and monuments ===
- Church of Saint Margaret of Cambia

==== Santa Maria Chapel ====
For the dating the archaeologist Geneviève Moracchini-Mazel writes: "We proposed to remember that its construction, like that of the church of San Chilico, could date from the last years of the century or the 13th ^{e}century and that it had to intervene in place of a previous pre-romane chapel (rejoices in the bell tower). “]

It should be emphasized (importance beyond the local setting) the originality of this Romanesque chapel: "It is the only Romanesque altar in place that has been preserved in Corsica - G. Moracchini-Mazel.” In addition, its stazzona (dolmen) shape is disturbing: the three orthostates and the table give it the classical dolmenic shape in the south of the island, but of which there is no trace in Castagniccia. All the more so, since it is the only altar of this type found intact, and it is attested that the chapel replaced a previous pre-Roman building.

The entire chapel is classified as a historical monument

==== Stantara Santa Maria ====
With a cross engraved on the navel, the statue-menhir of Santa Maria Christianized is erected at the foot of the chapel of the same name.

It is the object of legends especially that of a stupid bet. It would be the statue of a young girl from the petrified village. To prove her courage, the girl as fearless as she is outrageous, would have tried one night to sink a stick into a grave. Death would have seized her, freezing for eternity the unfortunate in fear.

Another legend has it that a young girl from the village had to go to the door of the nearby church at midnight to challenge a vampire. A young man hidden inside answered. Seized with dread, the girl would have been suddenly petrified. The statue would have been raised in his memory. He's been called from the Saint.

==== Old Convent ====
The ruins of a convent are visible at the back of the photo of the stantara. It is probably the chapel, judging by the remains of a cross-vault, visible to the four corners of the first room still identifiable.

==== In Petra Frisgiata ====
In Petra Frisgiata (or Petra frigiata, Petra frisgiada) is a large flat rock located near both the Stantara Santa Maria and the Romanesque chapel Santa Maria. The Petra frisgiada I is the most complete rock art site of Corsica (importance beyond the local setting): « 595 signs have been noted, which makes the Petra Frisgiata I the most complete and therefore the most provided rock art site on the island. " "The study of the superpositions and the nature of the signs refers to several periods, between the Iron Age and the contemporary period"].

It is remarkable that, at the limit of the same pievepieve, (E Vallerustie), (between the communes of Carticasi and Bustanico), is the rock art site E Schippiate which is second in Corsica for the number of engraved signs. The shade displayed by these two appellations (A Petra Frisgiata and E Schippiate) is, linguistically and historically, very interesting. In Cambia, as in all the pieve, other engraved rocks exist in the maquis.

- The three monuments of Corsuli (Capella Santa Maria, Stantara Santa Maria and Petra Frisgiata di Santa Maria) are not yet inscribed as an MH.

Surrounded by a forest of green oaks, they are accessible and indicated from Corsoli. Visits are organized.

==== Chapel San Chirgu ====
Detailed article : Chapel San Quilico de Cambia.

Above, at the top of the hamlet of San Chirgu, is the path leading to a Romanesque chapel dating from the 13th ^{e}century: the chapel San Quilico or San Chirgu (Saint Cyr) decorated with carved decorations. The chapel was listed as a Historic Monument on June 15, 1976, under the name of Church of San Quilicu

The oral tradition is that the two chapels (which are within reach of voices) were built at the same time. San Chirgu by the father (who supervised all the work), Santa Maria by the son. Geneviève Moracchini-Mazel confirms that they "were certainly built at the same time".

- Chapel San Quilico - restoration 2009
- Side facade
- Pattern of the side facade
- Fronton

These two frescoed chapels were restored in 2008 - 2009 under the aegis of the Territorial Collectivity of Corsica. The work was co-financed by the state (70%), the CTC (25%) and the municipality (5%).

==== The Santa-Catalina Chapel of Loriani ====
Religious building of the century, in stone, schist and rubble. In the small niche above the porch is the statuette of St. Catherine the patron saint.

==== Other ====
- Oppidum of Corsuli

From the site of the medieval castle, transformed in 1358 during the so-called "a terra di u cumunu" revolution, there is currently only part of the tower (incorporated since these events), in the first house of the village. It was the place of residence of the “Lieu-Tenant”, representing the lords Bianculacci, from (Ghjuvellina) to the great fiefdom of which, the pievepieve of the Vallerustia belonged. Mount St-Blaise, a significant promontory of this place, was probably a religious site whose history is lost in the past not yet explored from the time of the small fridge.

- Prehistoric burial of Loriani (table on natural uprights). Excavations Michel-Claude Weiss.

== See also ==
- Communes of the Haute-Corse department
