= Julien Giovannetti =

French operatic baritone

Julien Giovannetti (9 January 1914 – 29 January 1966) born in Morosaglia in Haute-Corse, was a French baritone at the Opéra-Comique of Paris, a specialist of Mozart who performed many operas around the world.
