= Aiti =

- Commune
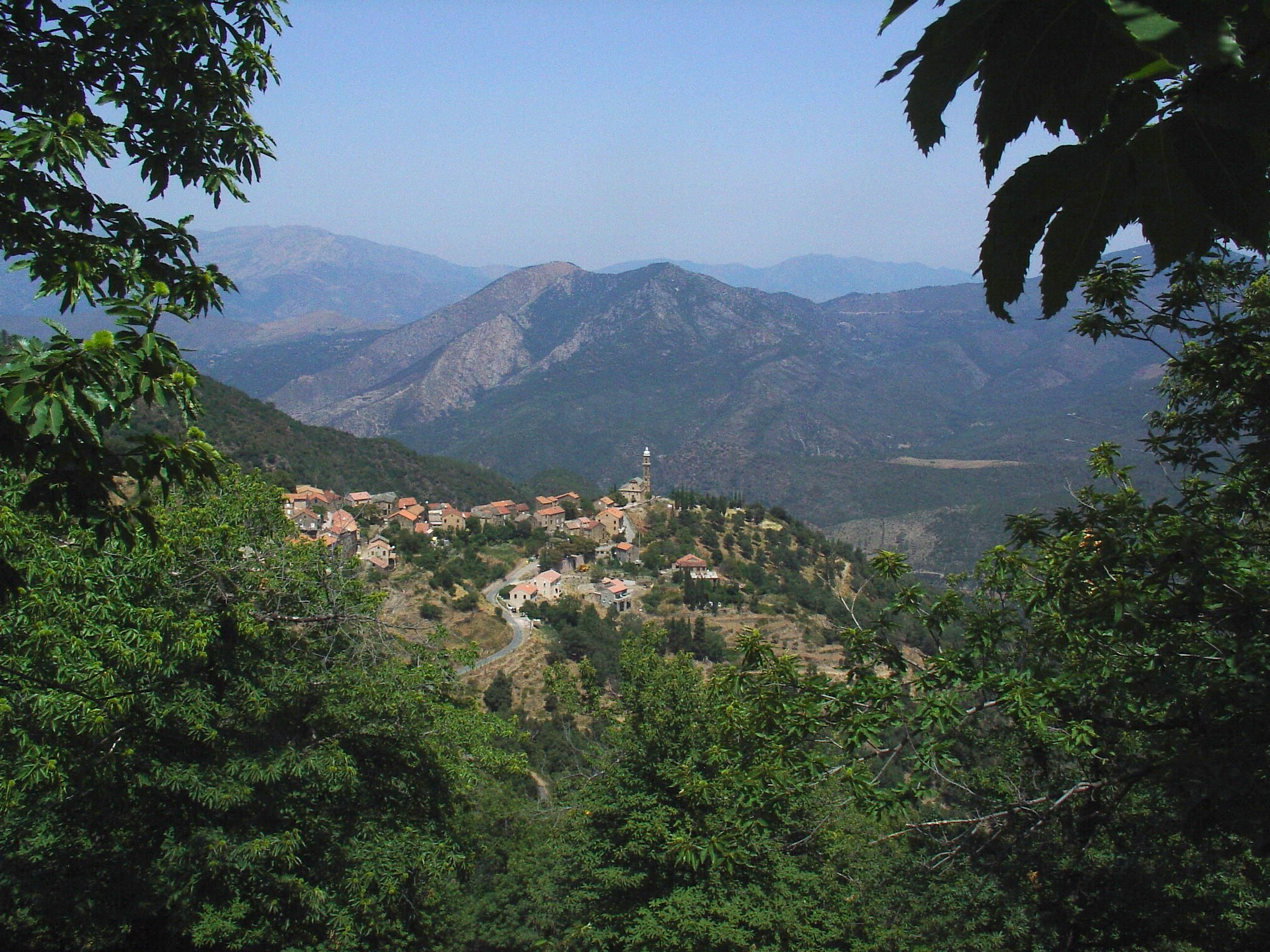
- A general view of Aiti
- Location of Aiti
- Location within France Location within Corsica
- Coordinates: 42°24′00″N 9°14′41″E
- Country: France
- Region: Corsica
- Department: Haute-Corse
- Arrondissement: Corte
- Canton: Golo-Morosaglia
- Intercommunality: Pasquale Paoli

Government
  - Mayor (2022–2026): Pierre Orsoni
- Area^{1}: 12.17 km^{2} (4.70 sq mi)
- Highest elevation: 1,120 m (3,670 ft)
- Lowest elevation: 240 m (790 ft)
- Population (2023): 27
  - Density: 2.2/km^{2} (5.7/sq mi)
- Time zone: UTC+01:00 (CET)
  - Summer (DST): UTC+02:00 (CEST)
- INSEE/Postal code: 2B003 /20244
- ^{1} French Land Register data, which excludes lakes, ponds, glaciers > 1 km^{2} (0.386 sq mi or 247 acres) and river estuaries.

Aiti (in Corsican Àiti, pronounced [ˈaː.i.di]) is a commune in the Haute-Corse department of France on the island of Corsica.

== Geography ==
Aiti is some 15 km north of Corte and about 25 km inland from the east coast of Corsica. The Highway N193 from Corte goes north passing near the eastern border of the commune however the commune can only be accessed from this side by the D39 from Francardo a tortuous and circuitous road. The commune can also be accessed from the eastern side from San-Lorenzo on the Highway D39 which has a small connecting road across a bridge to the D39 road which enters the commune from the south and is another tortuous and circuitous route to the village of Aiti. Other than some short mountain access roads there are no other roads in the commune.

=== Relief ===
Aiti occupies the northern part of the mountain chain in the west of the massif of Monte San Petrone (1,767 m) which is separated by the Casaluna Valley.

The commune lies "below the hill" (Cismonte in Corsican), or "Corsican Shale" in the north-east of the island along the edge of the Cap Corse shale which continues to the San Petrone mountains and ends south of Castagniccia. These mountains are a block of lustrous shale from the Tertiary period during the uplift of the Alps on the Hercynian bedrock at the end of the Paleozoic era.

The highest point in the commune is the Cima a l'Orzale (1,121 m) south of the town and the lowest point is next to the Golo river (238 m) to the north-west.

The commune is mountainous with the hills of Castagnicia to the west. It occupies a small portion of a low-lying area called "Cuvette de Ponte Leccia" (Ponte Leccia Basin) which is one of a series of central low-lying areas stretching from L'Île-Rousse to Solenzara through Ponte Leccia, Corte, and Cateraggio. It includes many small valleys where streams flow to the Golo or the Casaluna.

=== Hydrography ===
The western border of the commune is the Callasima River which flows north to join the Golo River near Ponte-Leccia.

Several streams run through the commune, emerging from either side of the valley. The main streams are Poggie, Coticcio (fed by the Campo and Riduri), and Fossa Ceca.

== Administration ==
List of Successive Mayors of Aiti

From	To	Name
2001	2022	Gérard Orsoni
2022	2026	Pierre Orsoni

== Population ==
The inhabitants of the commune are known as Aïtinchi.

Historical population
Year	Pop.	±% p.a.
1968	59	—
1975	32	−8.37%
1982	16	−9.43%
1990	26	+6.26%
1999	24	−0.89%
2007	31	+3.25%
2012	33	+1.26%
2017	30	−1.89%
2023	27	−1.74%
Source: INSEE

== Gallery ==
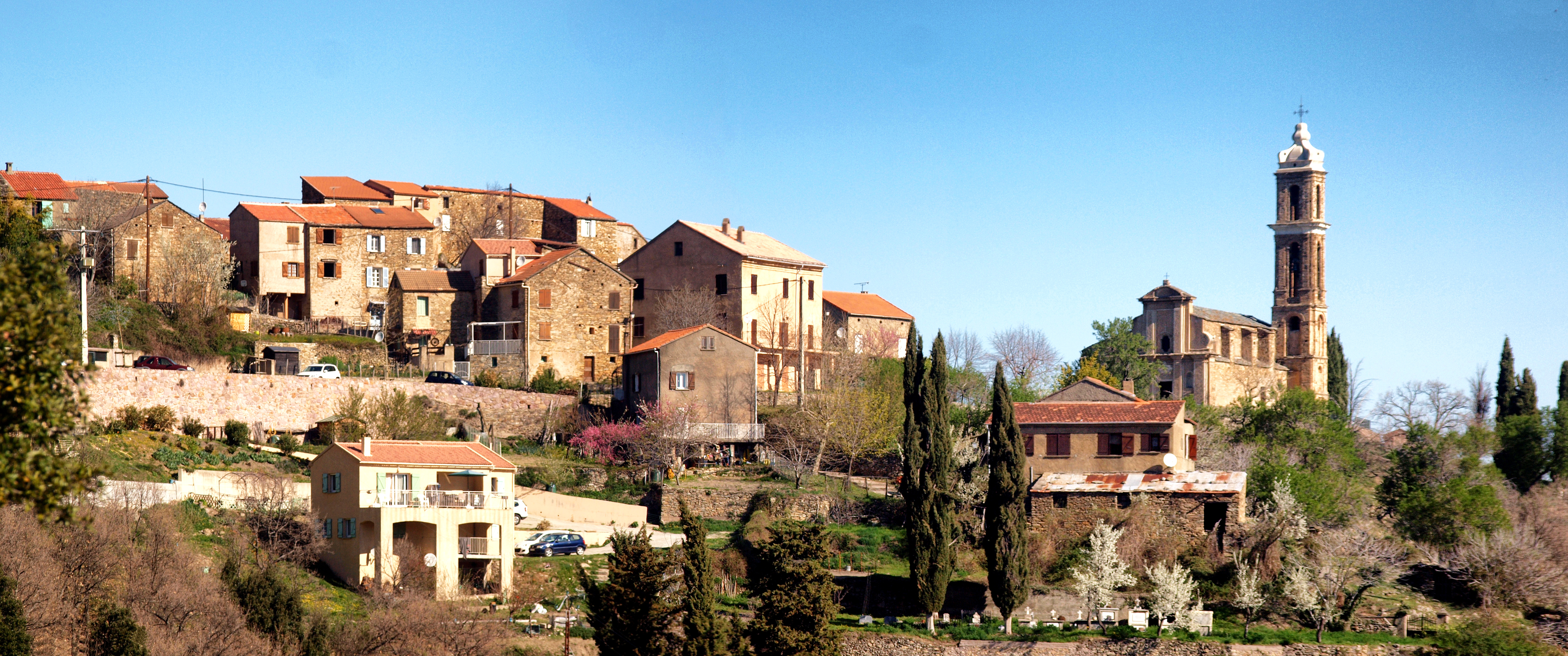
Panorama of the Village

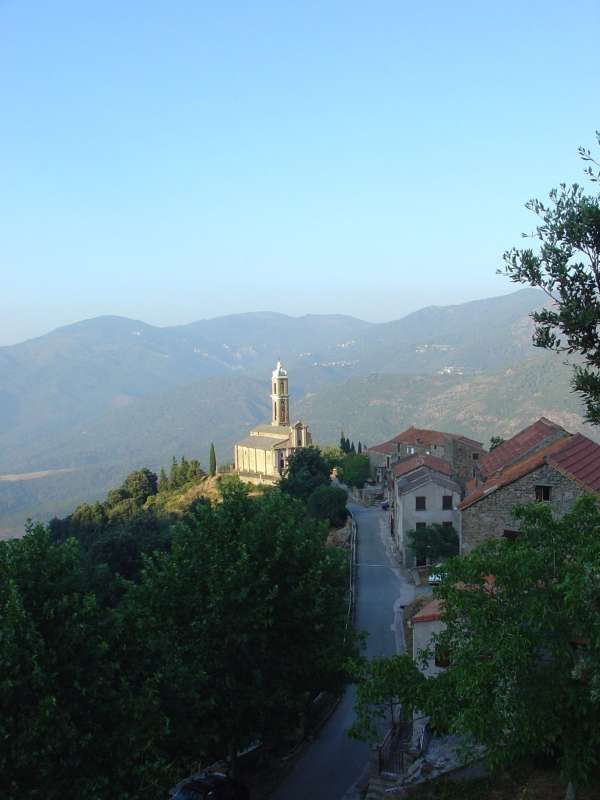
Aiti

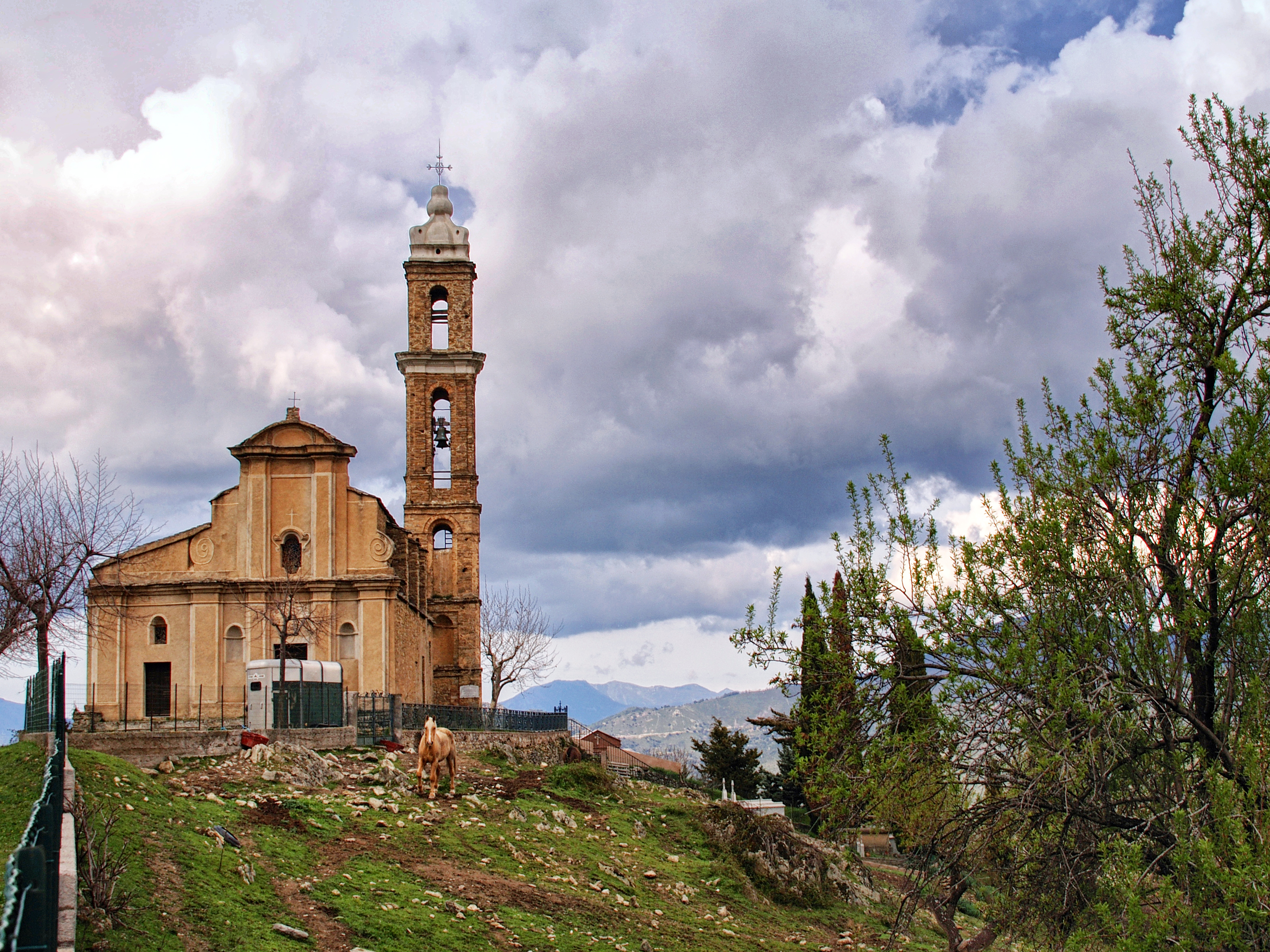
The Church of Saint-Stephen

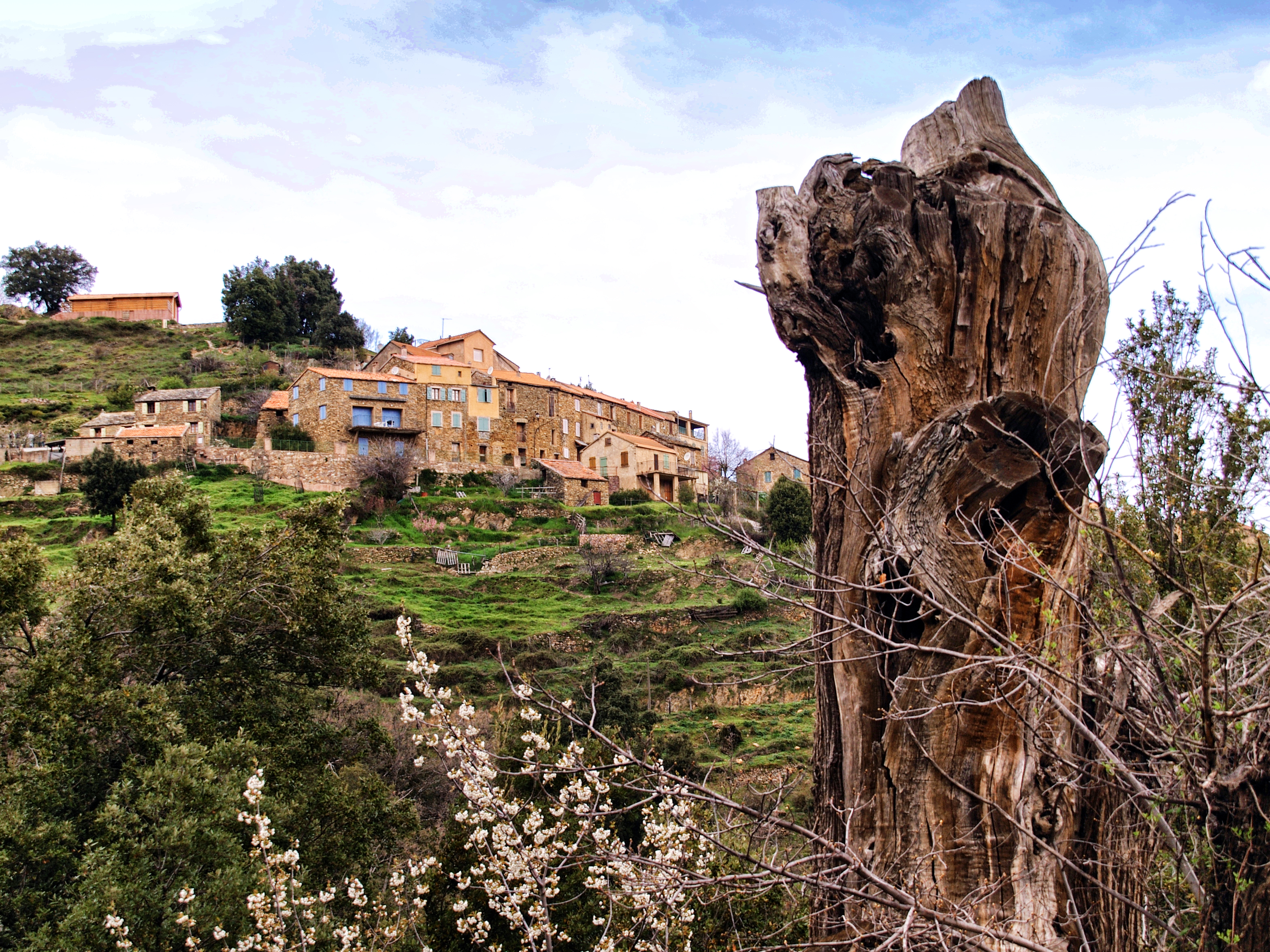
The area south of the village

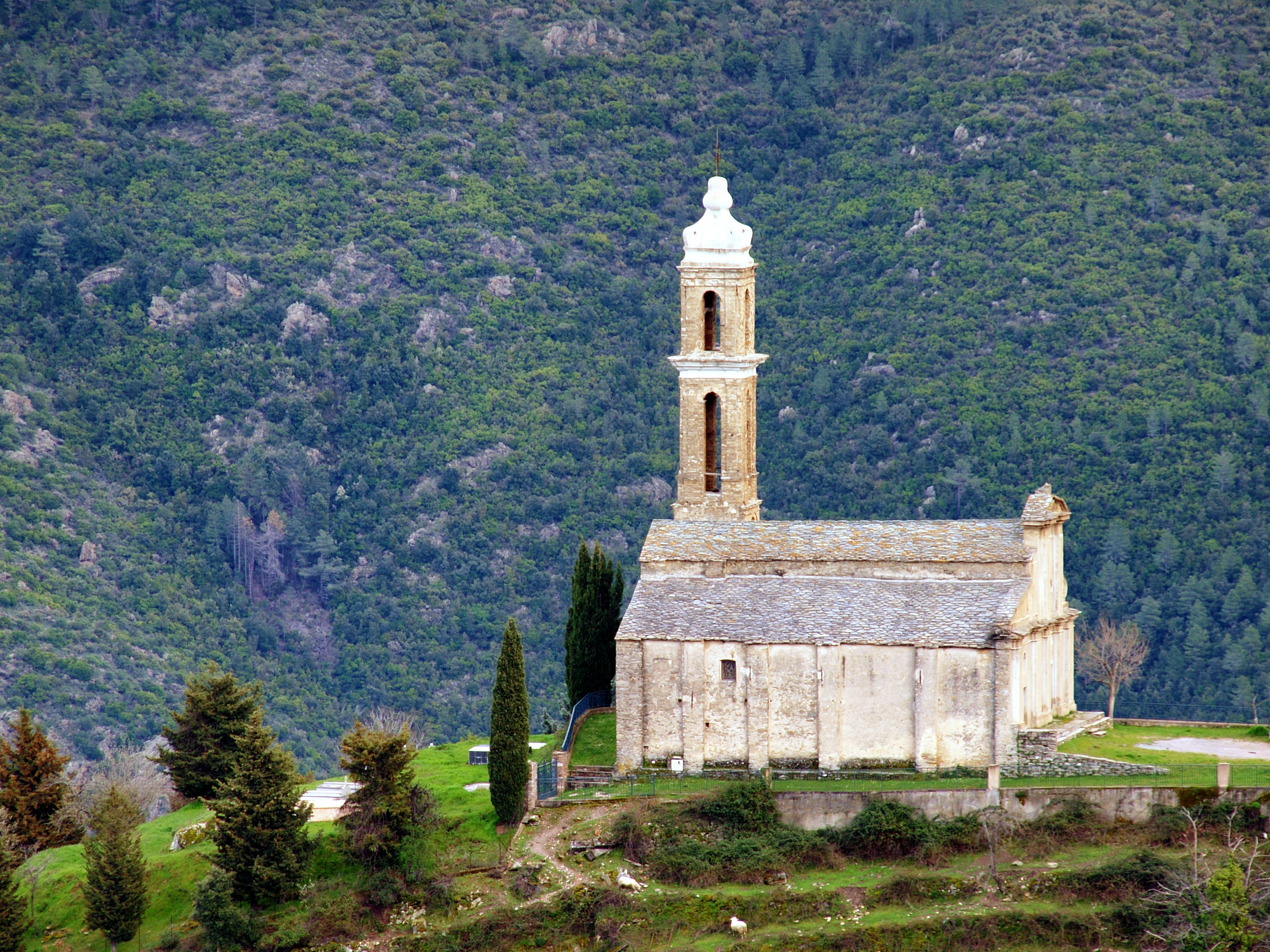
Facade of the Church of Saint-Stephen

== See also ==
- Communes of the Haute-Corse department
