= Statue-menhir of Santa Maria =

Megalithic menhir depicting a woman

Statue menhir of Santa Maria
- Statue-menhir de Santa Maria
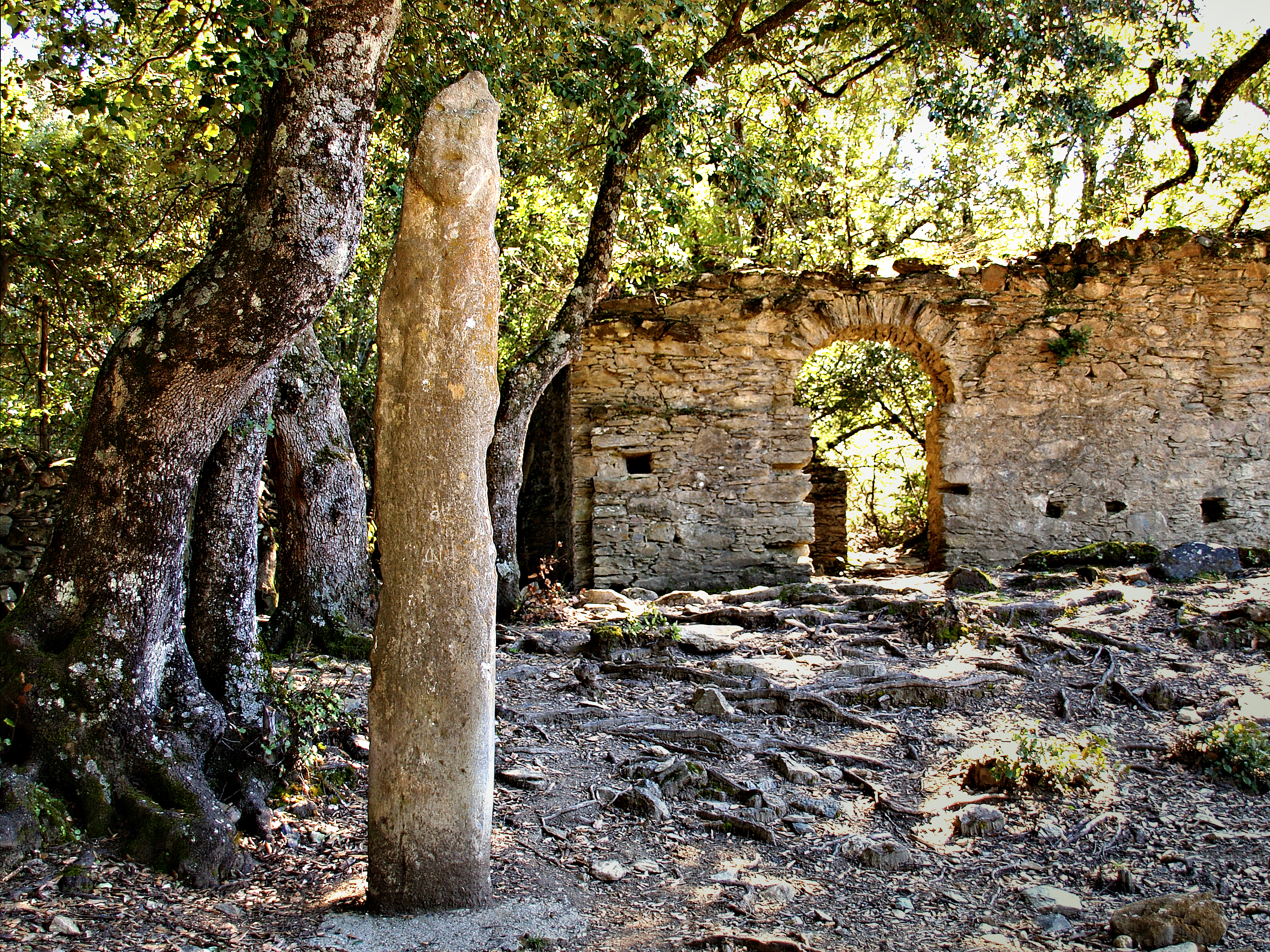
- General view of the building

- 42.370000°N 9.290000°E
- Region: Haute-Corse

Site notes
- Material: Schist
- Discovered: 1893

The statue-menhir of Santa Maria is a statue-menhir belonging to the Corsican group, discovered in Cambia, in the Haute-Corse department of France

== Description ==
It was reported in 1893. It seems to have remained at its original location, a crossroads of paths, where was later built a small Romanesque chapel that gave it its name.The Petra Frisgiata, a stone decorated with rock engravings, is located a few hundred meters further north.

Of slender shape, the statue measures 2.10 m in height by 0.35 m in width and 0.12 m It was carved into a block of shale The statue is very damaged, as the head is broken on both sides and the face has almost disappeared. It remains only the right eye; the nose and mouth are still discernible but very eroded. In the extension of the chin, an inverted "T" shaped relief pattern may correspond to an ornamental element. Many cups are visible on the barrel of the statue side face, including two at the level of the breasts, and on the back side. The statue was Christianized by the addition of a small cross in the axis of the barrel.

== Folklore ==
According to a local legend, the statue is of a young girl who was turned to stone after desecrating a grave by planting a stick in it.
