= Lano, Haute-Corse =

Lano Lanu
- Commune
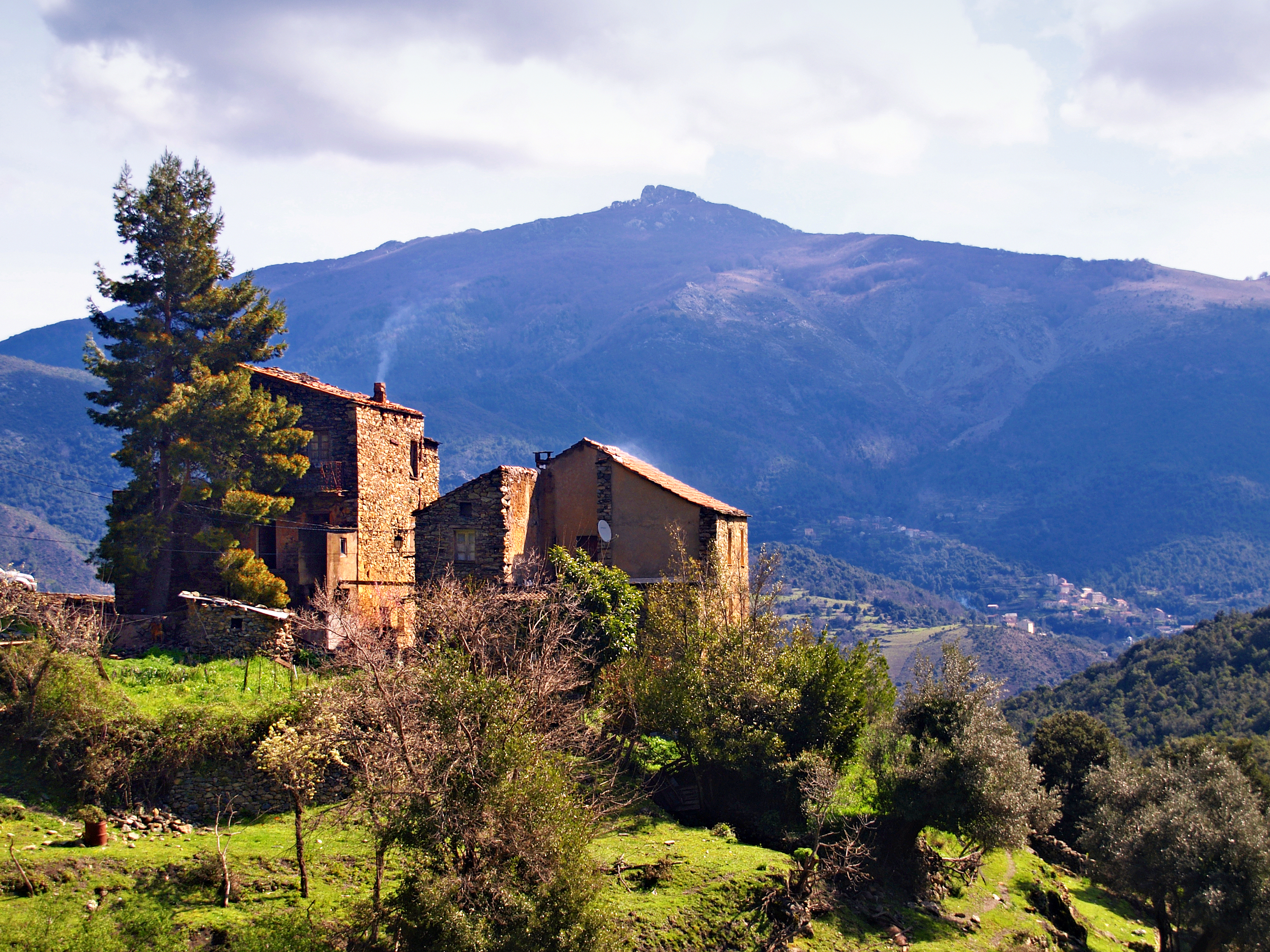
- Lano village and Monte San Petrone
- Location of Lano
- Location within France Location within Corsica
- Coordinates: 42°23′01″N 9°14′53″E
- Country: France
- Region: Corsica
- Department: Haute-Corse
- Arrondissement: Corte
- Canton: Golo-Morosaglia

Government
  - Mayor (2020–2026): Pierre Leschi
- Area^{1}: 8.15 km^{2} (3.15 sq mi)
- Elevation: 600 m (2,000 ft)
- Highest elevation: 1,335 m (4,380 ft)
- Lowest elevation: 414 m (1,358 ft)
- Population (2023): 21
  - Density: 2.6/km^{2} (6.7/sq mi)
- Time zone: UTC+01:00 (CET)
  - Summer (DST): UTC+02:00 (CEST)
- INSEE/Postal code: 2B137 /20244
- ^{1} French Land Register data, which excludes lakes, ponds, glaciers > 1 km^{2} (0.386 sq mi or 247 acres) and river estuaries.

Lano (French pronunciation: [lano]; Corsican: Lanu) is a commune in the Haute-Corse department of France on the island of Corsica.

== Population ==
Historical population
Year	Pop.	±% p.a.
1968	58	—
1975	49	−2.38%
1982	40	−2.86%
1990	20	−8.30%
1999	21	+0.54%
2007	22	+0.58%
2012	24	+1.76%
2017	25	+0.82%
2023	21	−2.86%
Source: INSEE

== See also ==
- Communes of the Haute-Corse department
