= Carticasi =

- Commune
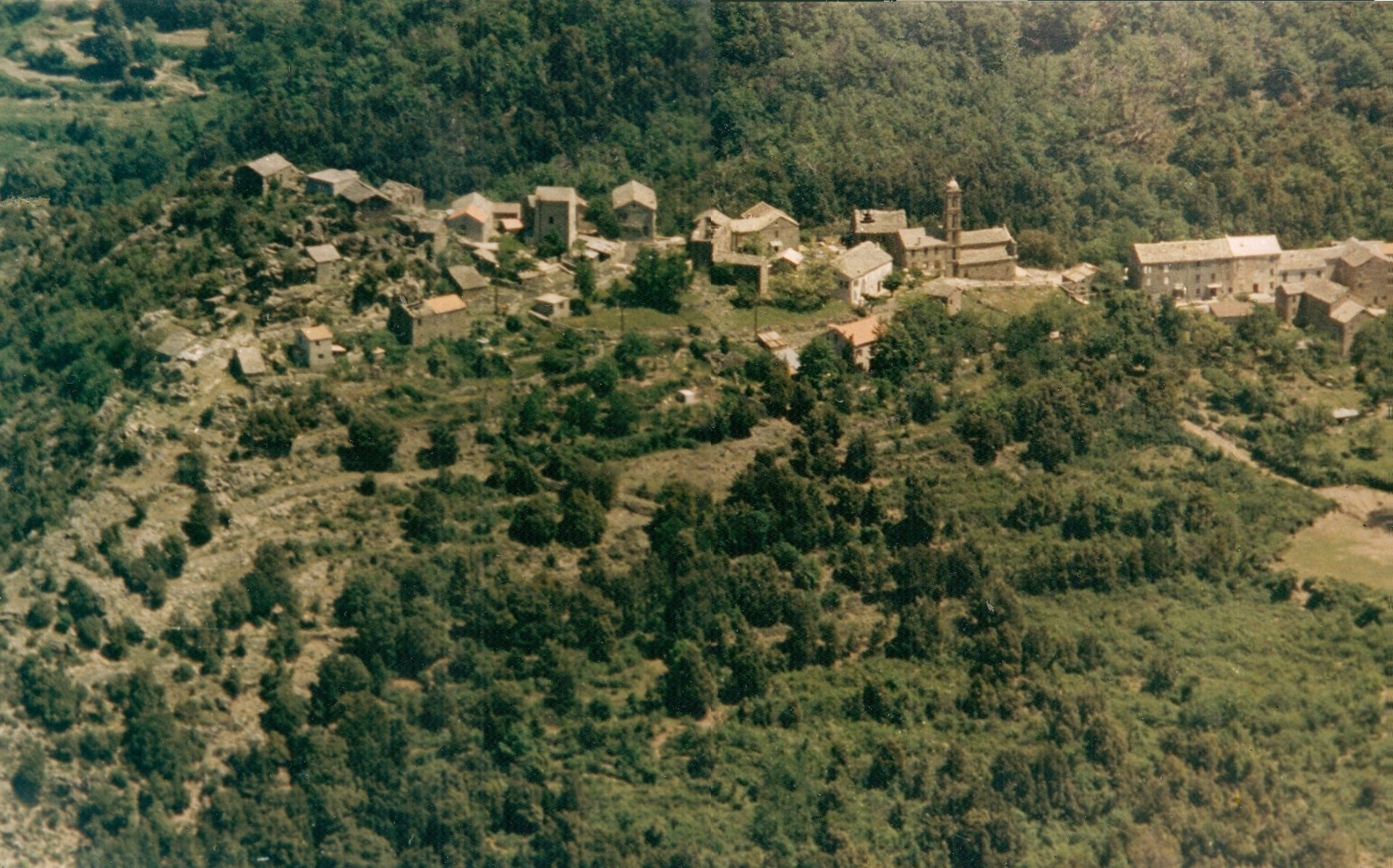
- A general view of Carticasi

- Coat of arms
- Location of Carticasi
- Location within France Location within Corsica
- Coordinates: 42°21′28″N 9°17′28″E
- Country: France
- Region: Corsica
- Department: Haute-Corse
- Arrondissement: Corte
- Canton: Golo-Morosaglia

Government
  - Mayor (2021–2026): Jean Renucci
- Area^{1}: 12.8 km^{2} (4.9 sq mi)
- Elevation: 886 m (2,907 ft)
- Highest elevation: 1,697 m (5,568 ft)
- Lowest elevation: 652 m (2,139 ft)
- Population (2023): 25
  - Density: 2.0/km^{2} (5.1/sq mi)
- Time zone: UTC+01:00 (CET)
  - Summer (DST): UTC+02:00 (CEST)
- INSEE/Postal code: 2B068 /20244
- ^{1} French Land Register data, which excludes lakes, ponds, glaciers > 1 km^{2} (0.386 sq mi or 247 acres) and river estuaries.

Carticasi is a commune in the Haute-Corse department of France on the island of Corsica.

== Population ==
Historical population
Year	Pop.	±% p.a.
1968	68	—
1975	55	−2.99%
1982	21	−12.85%
1990	18	−1.91%
1999	26	+4.17%
2007	30	+1.80%
2012	35	+3.13%
2017	27	−5.06%
2023	25	−1.27%
Source: INSEE

== See also ==
- Communes of the Haute-Corse department
