= Monte San Petrone =

Mountain in Corsica

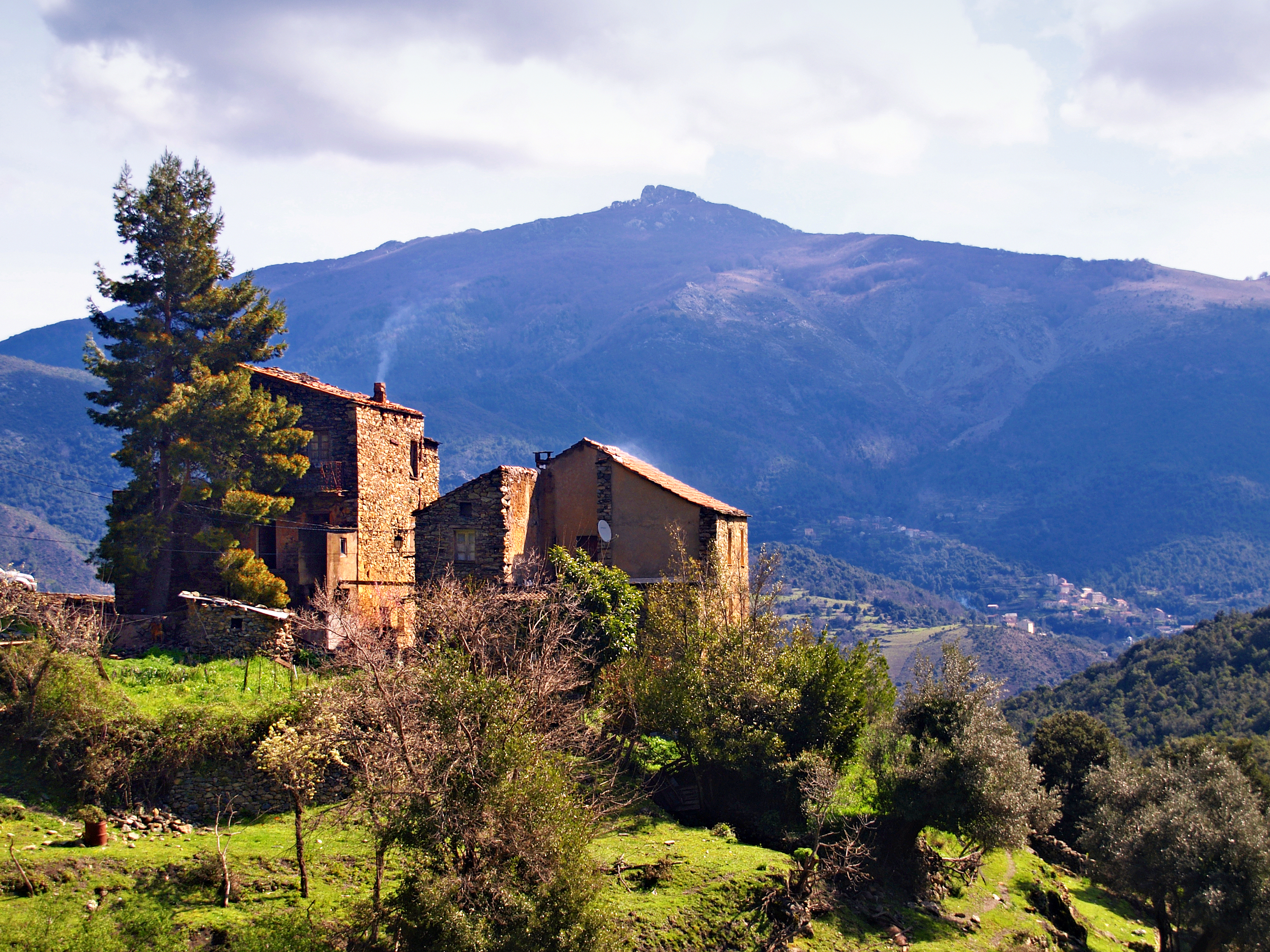
- View of the mountain from Lano. On the right, the village of San-Lorenzo.

Highest point
- Elevation: 1,767 m (5,797 ft)
- Prominence: 1,208 m (3,963 ft)
- Isolation: 18.55 km (11.53 mi)
- Listing: Ribu
- Coordinates: 42.39625°N 9.32681°E

Geography
- Location within Corsica
- Country: France
- Department: Haute-Corse

Monte San Petrone is a mountain in the department of Haute-Corse on the island of Corsica, France. It is the highest mountain in the Monte San Petrone Massif, which is the southernmost of the schist massifs in the northeast of the island.

== Location ==
The Monte San Petrone is the highest peak in the Castagniccia region, named after the abundant sweet chestnut trees in the northeast of Corsica. It is bounded by the Golo valley to the north, the Tyrrhenian Sea to the east, the Tavignano valley to the south, and the central valley of Corse from Corte to Ponte Leccia in the east. There are three ridges in the district running roughly north-south: the Mont Piano Maggiore ridge is to the west, the Monte San Pedrone ridge is in the center and is the main ridge of the region, and the eastern ridge includes Monte Negrine and Monte Castello d'Osani.

The peak marks the meeting point of the boundaries of the cantons of Saliceto to the northwest, Nocario to the northeast, Campana to the southeast and San-Lorenzo to the southwest. The Statuette of San Petru is on the eastern slope of the mountain. The village of Saliceto is to the west and Nocario is to the east. The Fium'Alto river originates on the south of the mountain.

== Physical ==
Monte San Petrone has an elevation of 1,767 metres (5,797 ft), clean prominence of 1,208 metres (3,963 ft), and isolation of 18.55 kilometres (11.53 mi). Its nearest higher neighbor is Pinerole at 1,951 metres (6,401 ft), to the west-northwest. (Note: PeakVisor says that the nearest higher neighbour is Pinzi a i Giuelli, 11.6 miles (18.7 km) to the west.) Monte Cinto, the highest mountain on Corsica, is 19.5 miles (31.4 km) to the west.

== Hiking ==
Hikers can access Monte San Petrone in the spring, summer, and autumn. It may have snow cover in the winter. The trail from Col de Prato on the D71 road mainly runs through beach and pine woods, which provide shade from the summer heat. The trail is 6 kilometres (3.7 mi) long and rises 800 metres (2,600 ft). It may take a walker in good condition three hours to complete.

== Gallery ==
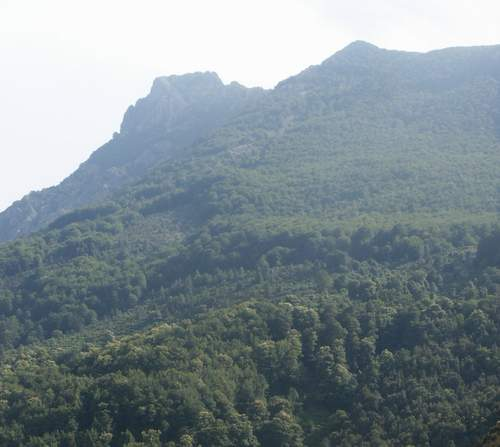
Monte San Petrone seen from Ampugnani

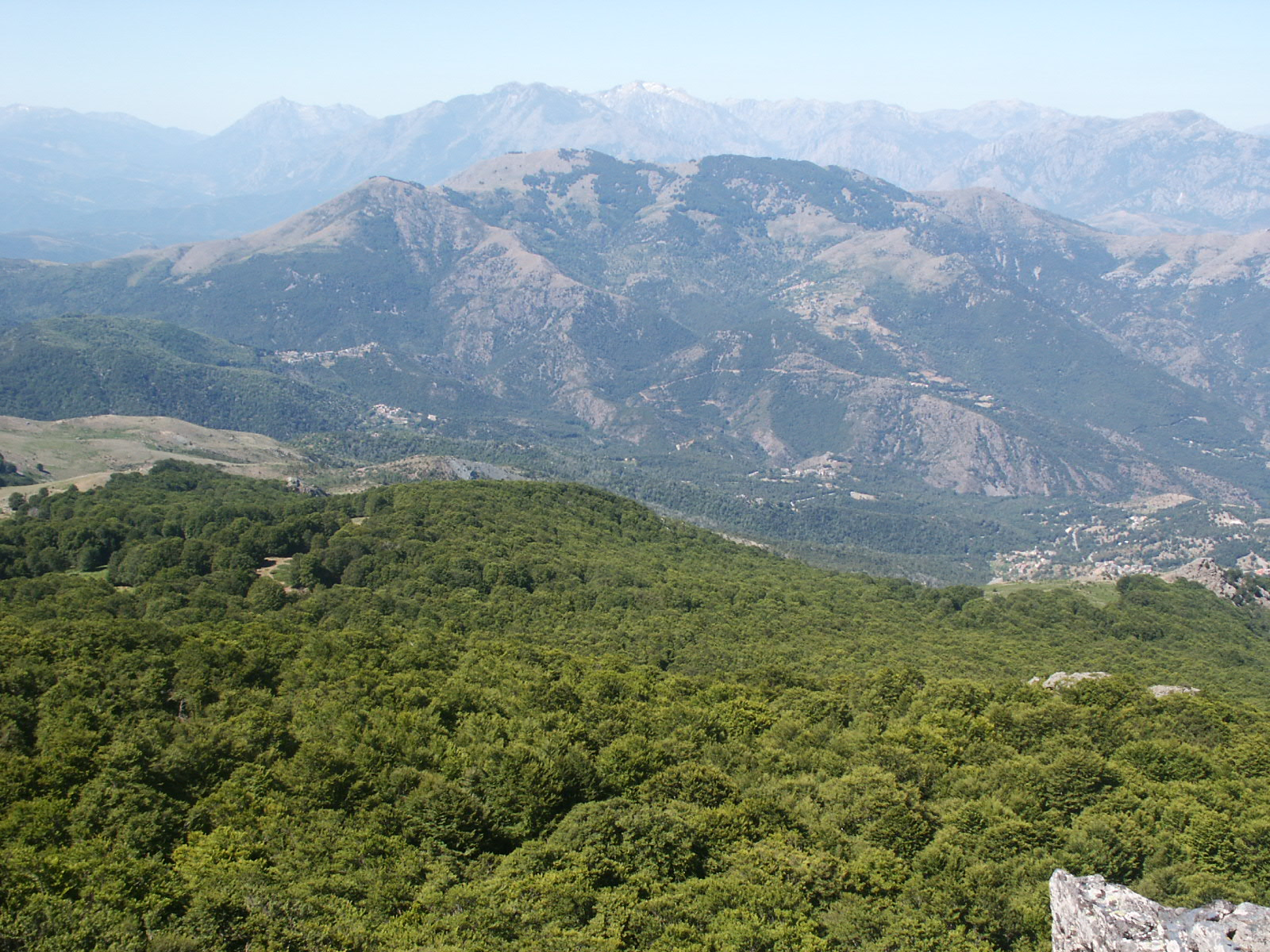
Panorama of the summit on the west side: the pieve du Vallerustie

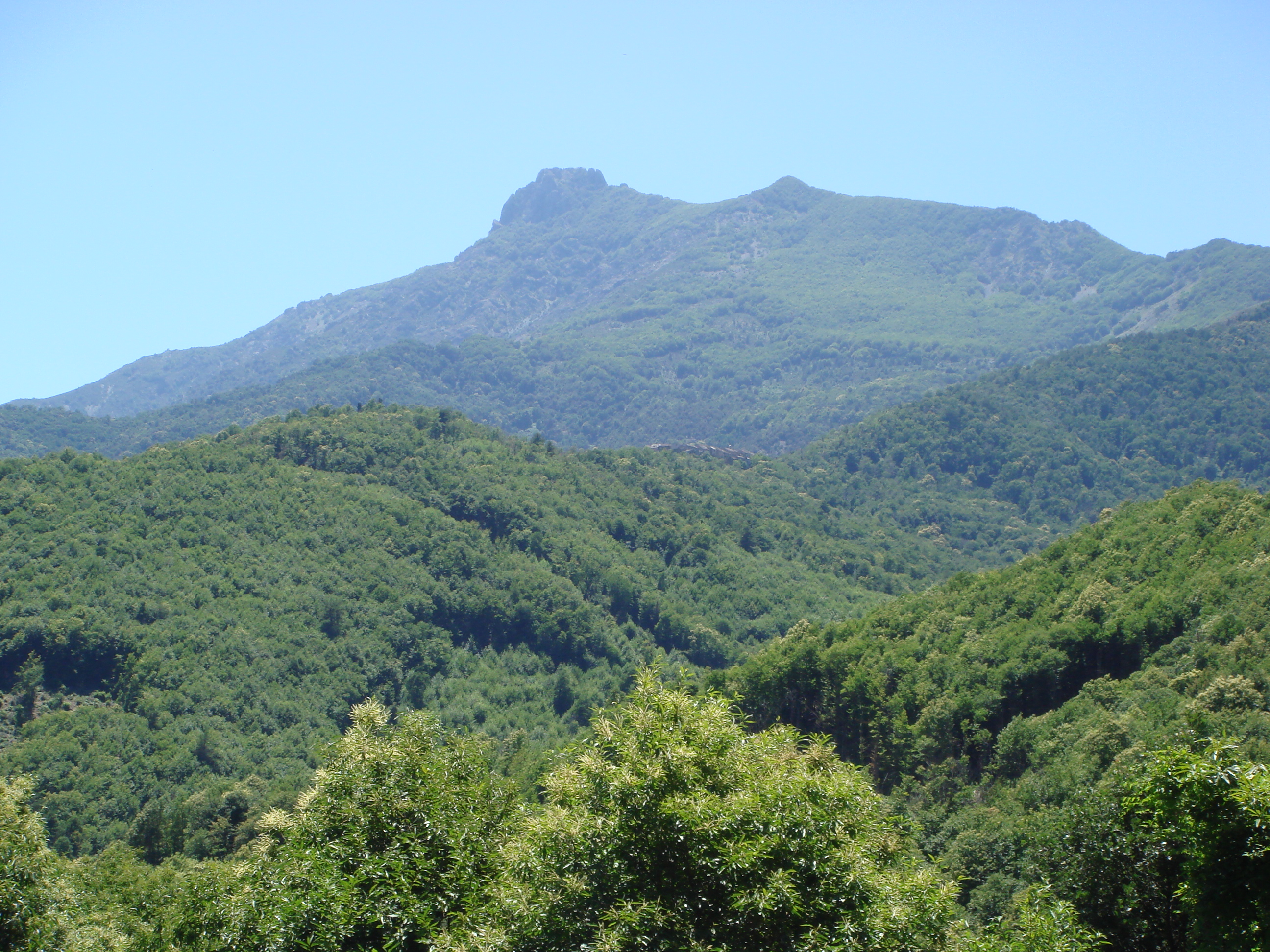
The Ampugnani valley and the summit of San Petrone

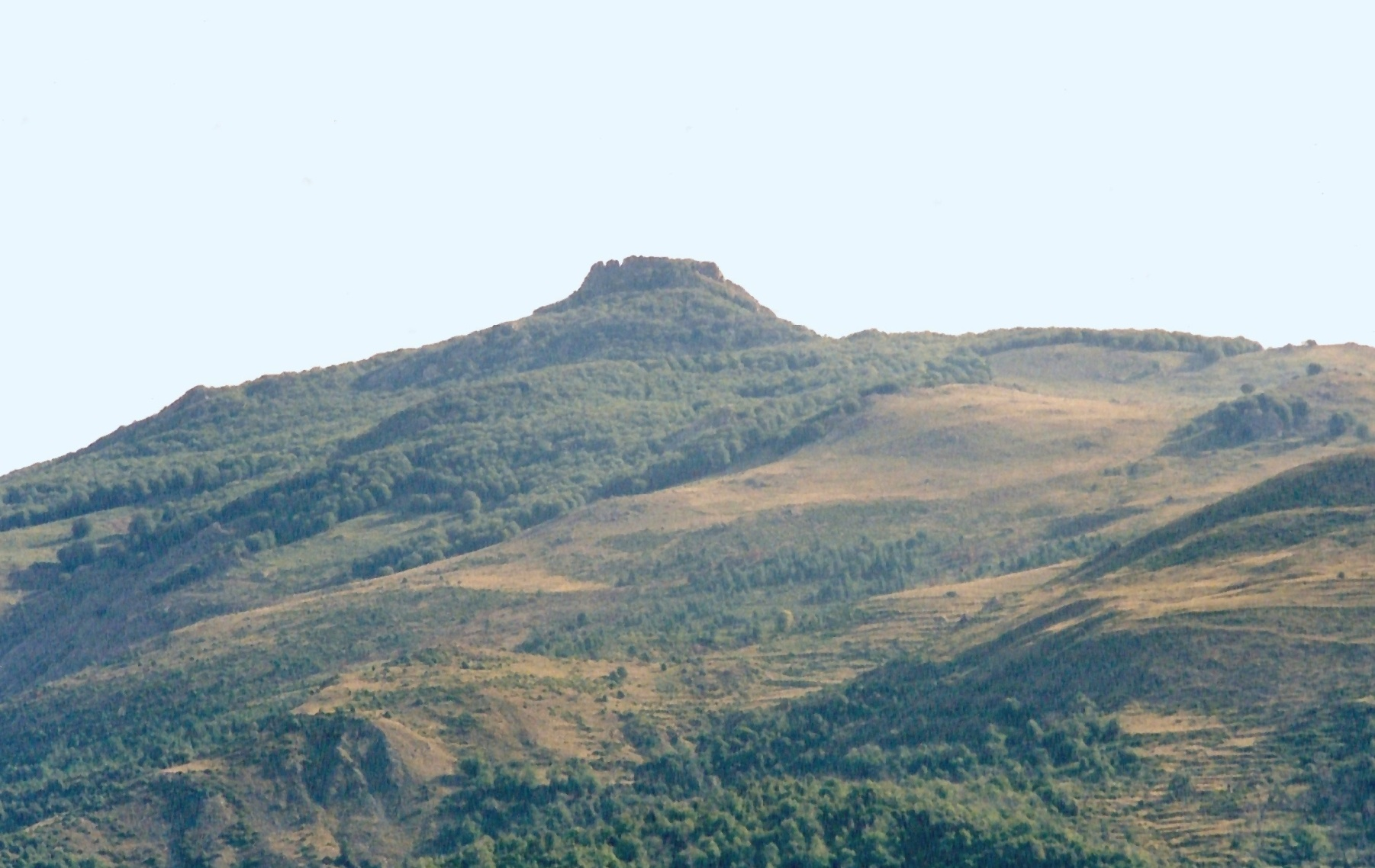
San Petrone seen from Carticasi

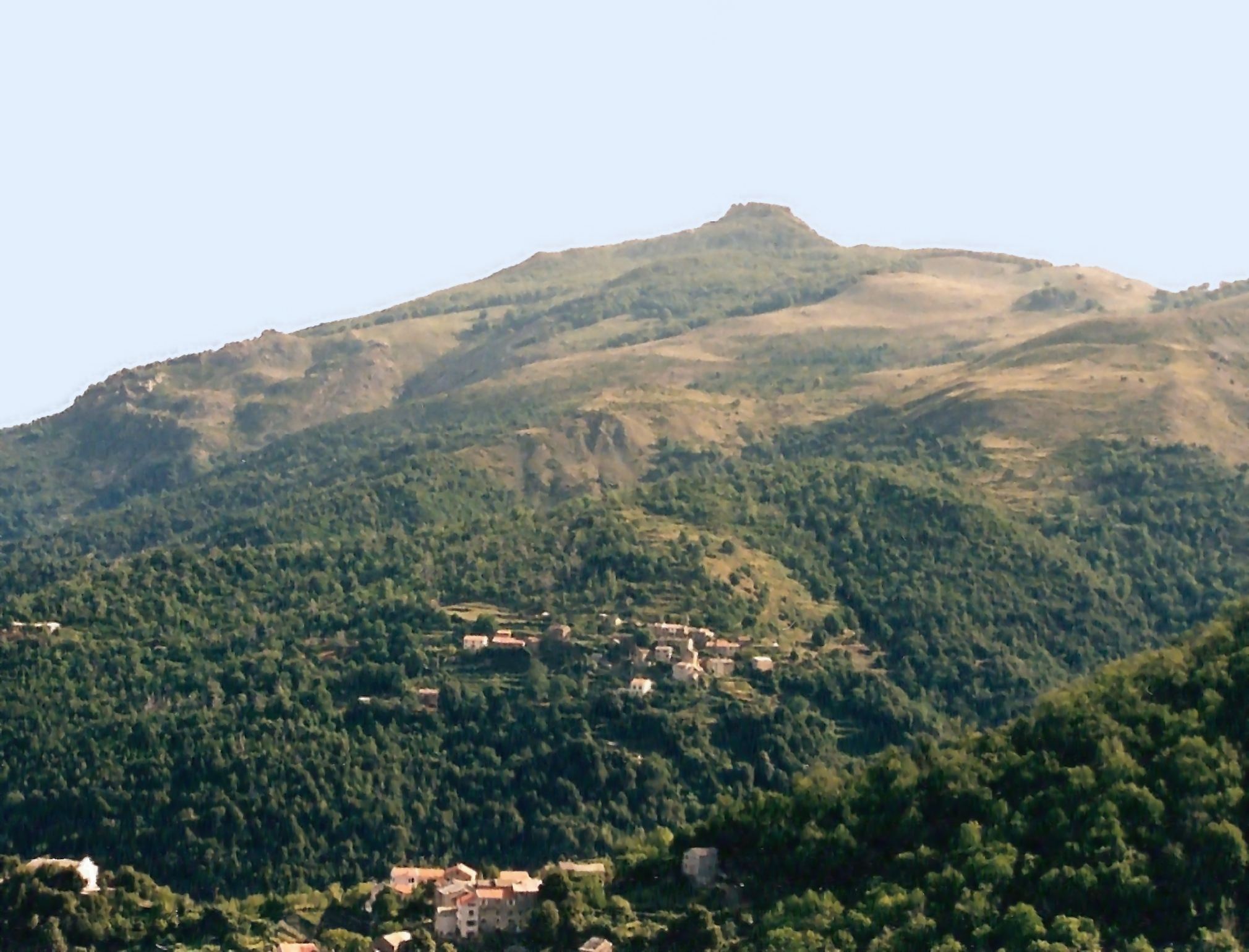
San Petrone and its gentle slopes on the Vallerustie side

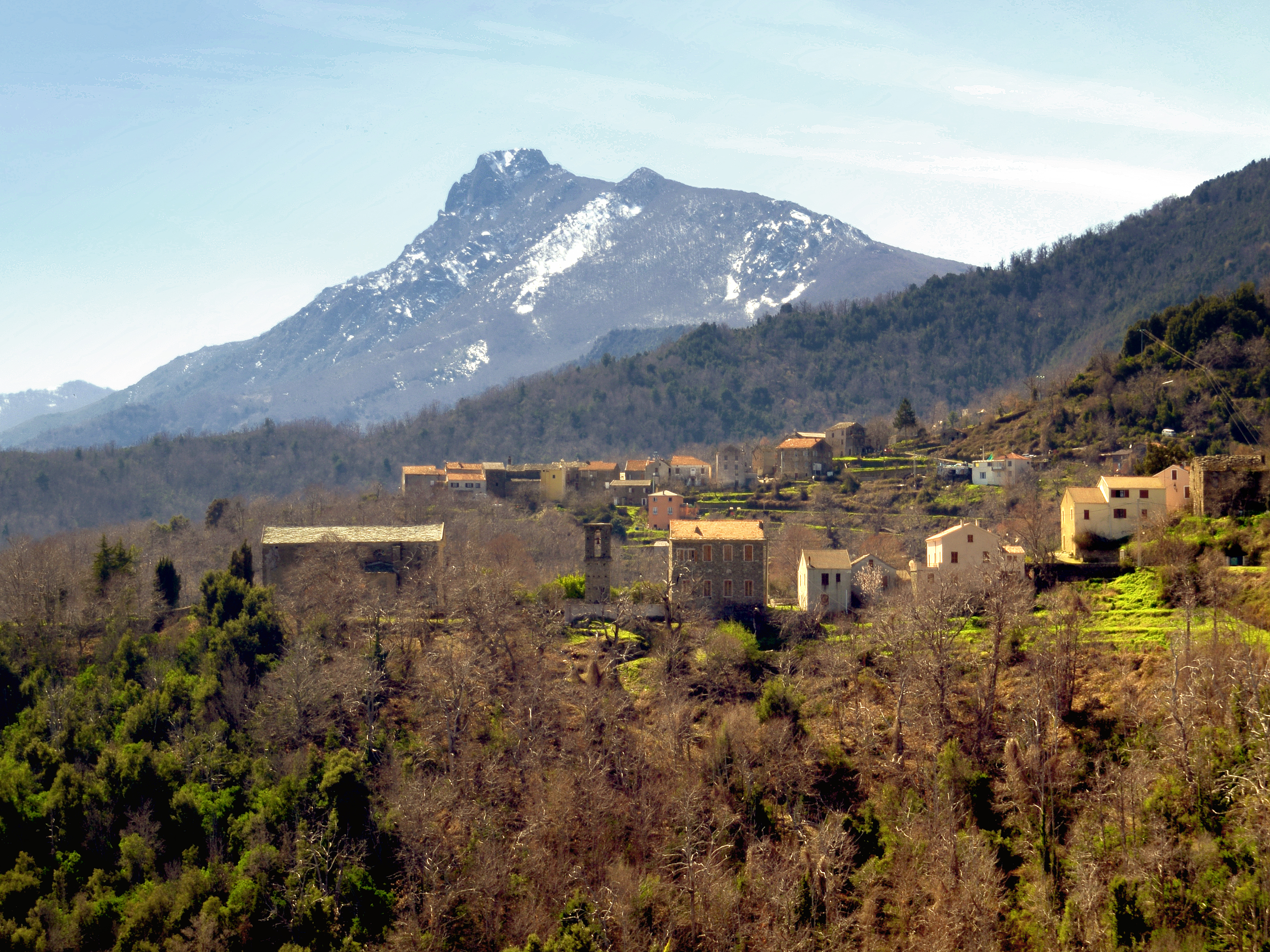
Crocicchia north of San Petrone.

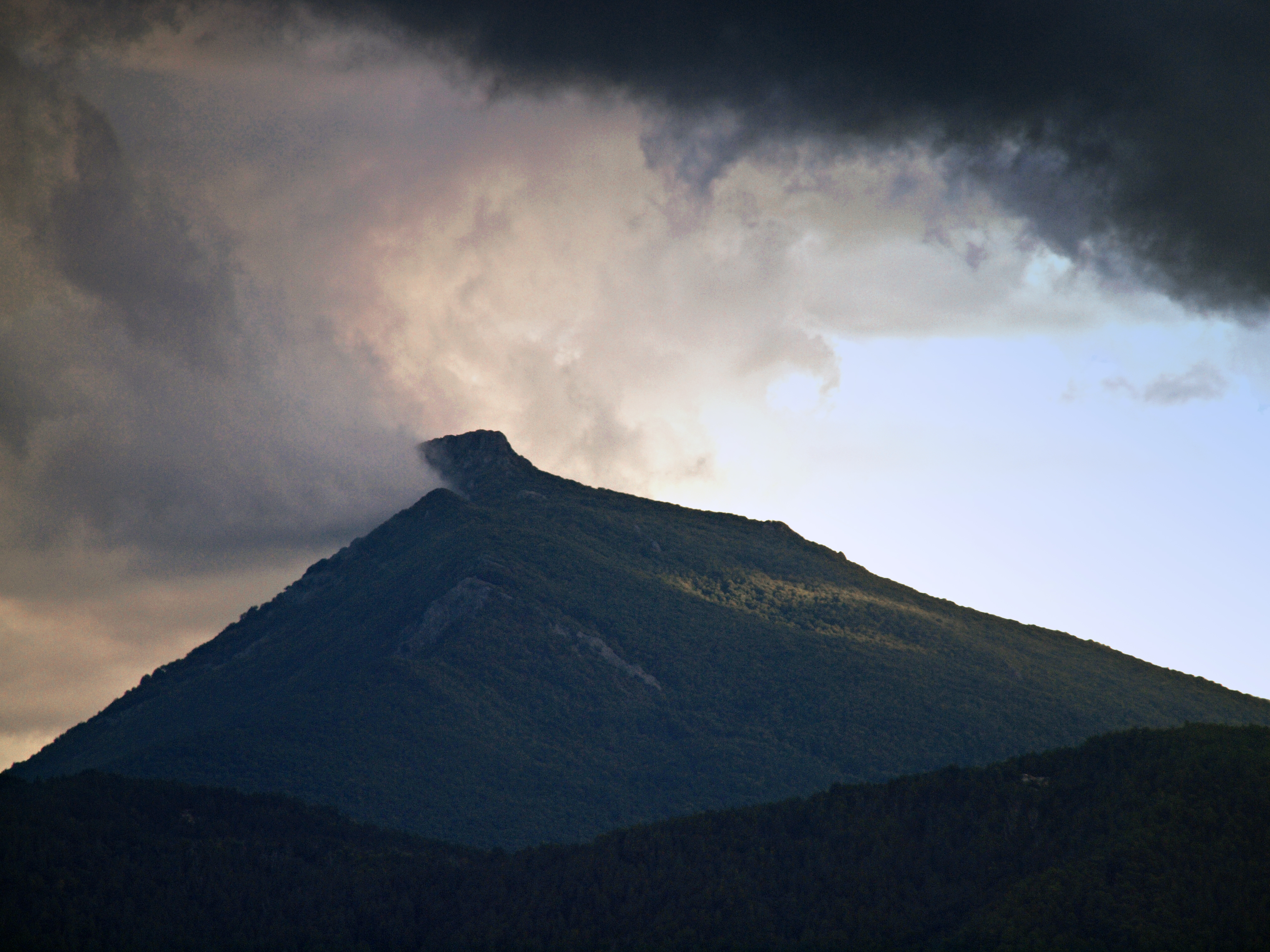
View of San Petrone from Bigorno Pass

== Sources ==
- "Ascension du san petrone au coeur de la castagniccia", Visit Corsica, Collectivité Territoriale de Corse: Agence du Tourisme
- "Monte San Petrone", PeakVisor
- "Monte San Petrone", SummitPost
- "Node: Monte San Petrone (26863958)", OpenStreetMap
- Petter Bjørstad, "Monte San Petrone, France", Peakbagger
