= Morosaglia =

Morosaglia Merusaglia
- Commune
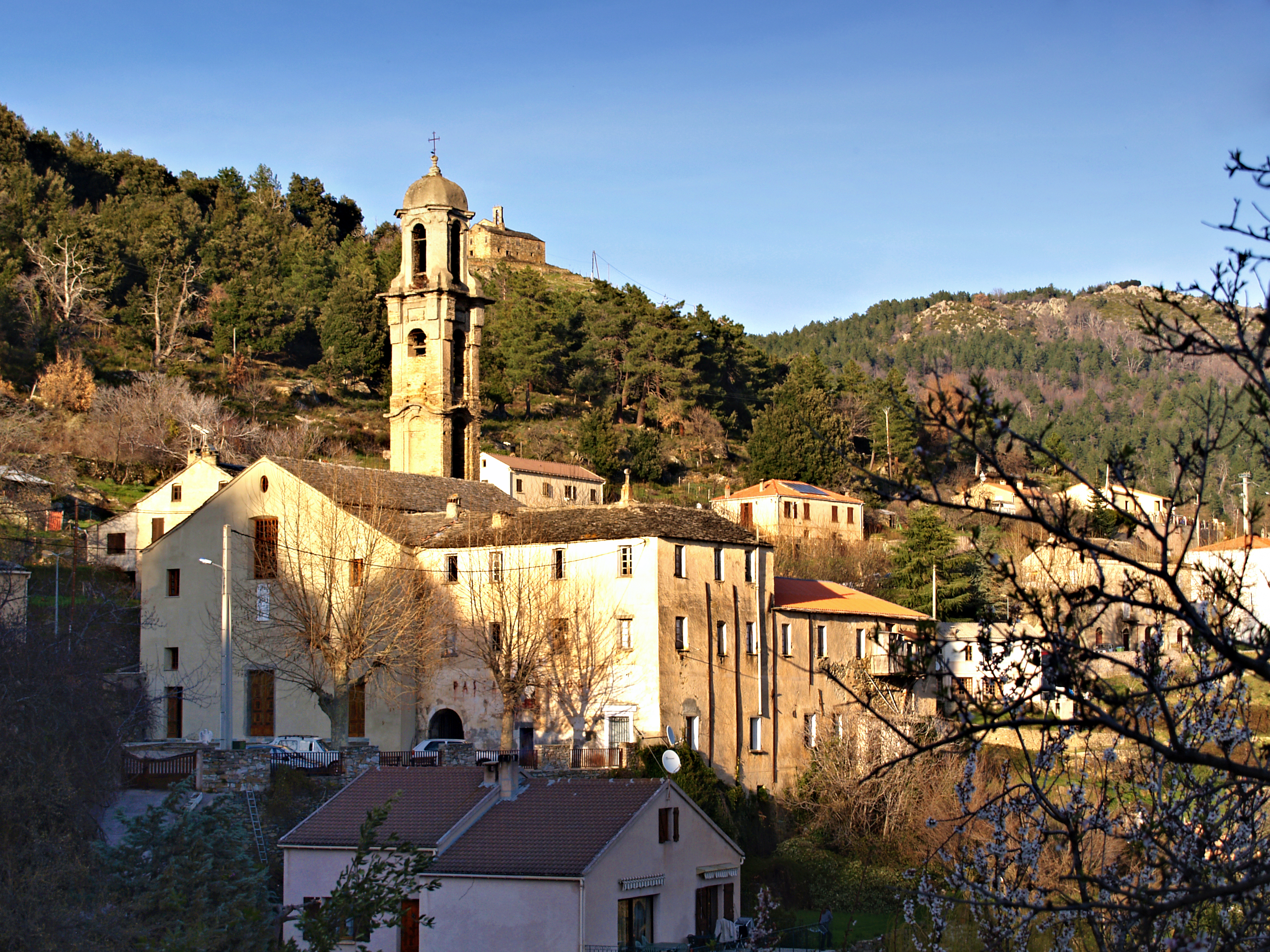
- Convento in Morosaglia

- Coat of arms
- Location of Morosaglia
- Location within France Location within Corsica
- Coordinates: 42°25′59″N 9°19′01″E
- Country: France
- Region: Corsica
- Department: Haute-Corse
- Arrondissement: Corte
- Canton: Golo-Morosaglia

Government
  - Mayor (2020–2026): Vincent Cognetti
- Area^{1}: 24 km^{2} (9.3 sq mi)
- Elevation: 860 m (2,820 ft)
- Highest elevation: 1,249 m (4,098 ft)
- Lowest elevation: 182 m (597 ft)
- Population (2023): 961
  - Density: 40/km^{2} (100/sq mi)
- Demonym(s): Merusaglincu, Merusaglinca (Corsican); Morosagliese (Italian)
- Time zone: UTC+01:00 (CET)
  - Summer (DST): UTC+02:00 (CEST)
- INSEE/Postal code: 2B169 /20218
- ^{1} French Land Register data, which excludes lakes, ponds, glaciers > 1 km^{2} (0.386 sq mi or 247 acres) and river estuaries.

Morosaglia (Italian pronunciation: [moˈrozaʎʎa]; French: [mɔʁoza(l)ja]; Corsican: Merusaglia, [mɛˈruzaʎʎa]) is a commune in the Haute-Corse department, on the island of Corsica, France. Since 2015, it is the seat of the canton of Golo-Morosaglia.

== History ==
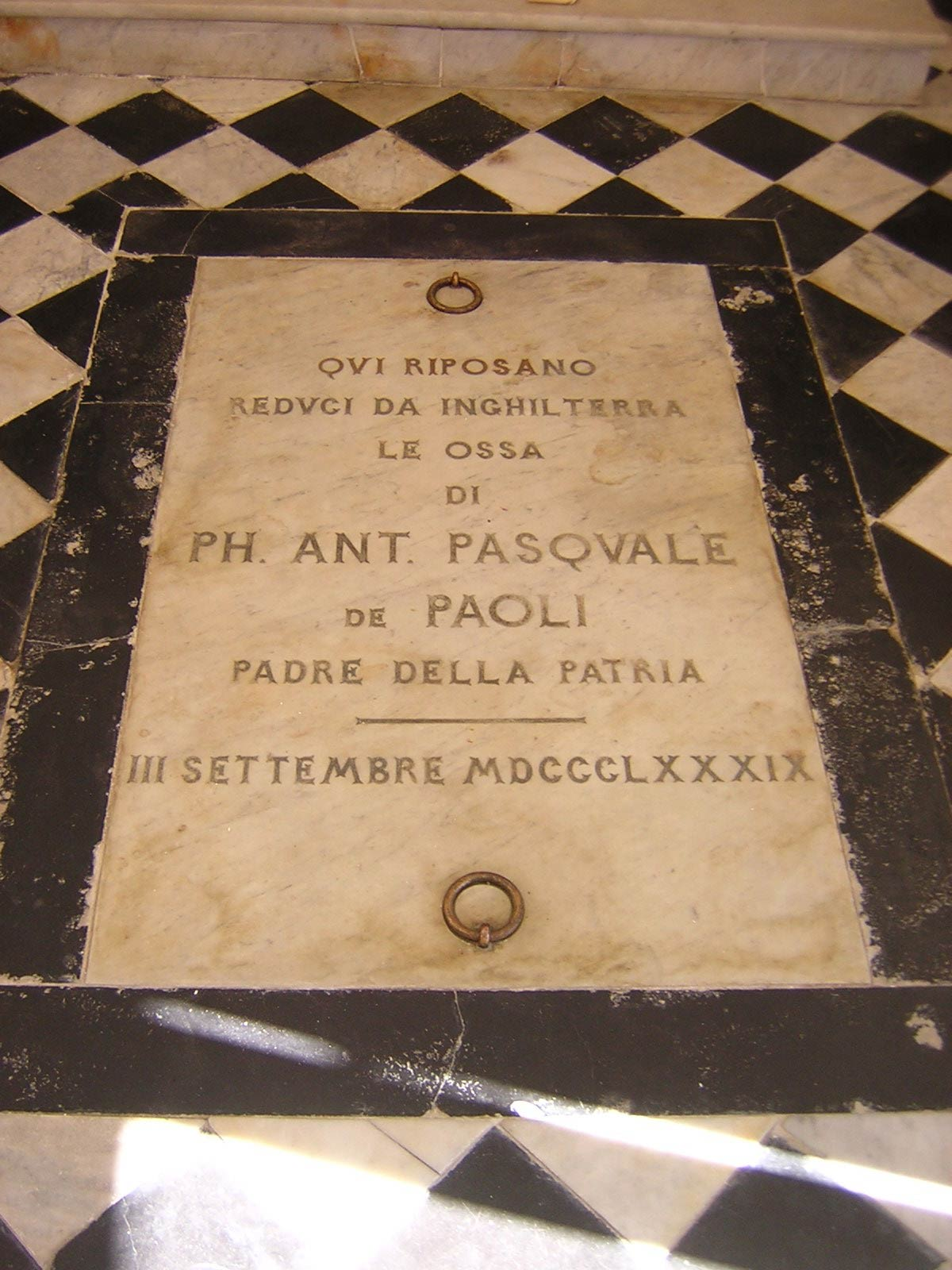
The tomb of Pasquale Paoli in his house of birth

Morosaglia is the native commune of Pasquale Paoli (1725-1807). The house in which he was born is a museum. This commune also is the historical seat of the Corsican Republic. Paoli had his chambers in the Franciscan monastery and the Corsican parliament met there.

== Geography ==
Morosaglia is 40 kilometres (25 mi) to the northeast of Corte in Castagniccia. The commune extends to the east to the largest mountain of Castagniccia, mounting to 1,230 metres (4,040 ft) to the peak of San Paolu, and stretches to the west for 13 kilometres (8 mi) beyond the river Golo.

In the plain of the river, nearly at its confluence with the Asco, on the Bastia-Ajaccio road, is the hamlet of Ponte-Leccia, where the only railway branch of the entire island is located, the branch to Calvi. The statisticians have given the name of Ponte-Leccia to a microregion of 3,800 people and 563 square kilometres (217 sq mi), which approximates the ancient parish of Caccia and the canton.

== Population ==
Historical population
Year	Pop.	±% p.a.
1968	694	—
1975	750	+1.11%
1982	854	+1.87%
1990	883	+0.42%
1999	1,008	+1.48%
2007	1,065	+0.69%
2012	1,134	+1.26%
2017	1,043	−1.66%
2023	961	−1.36%
Source: INSEE

== See also ==
- Ponte Leccia
- Communes of the Haute-Corse department
- Julien Giovannetti (1914–1966), baritone born in Morosaglia.
