= Monte San Petrone Massif =

Chain of mountains and named after its highest peak

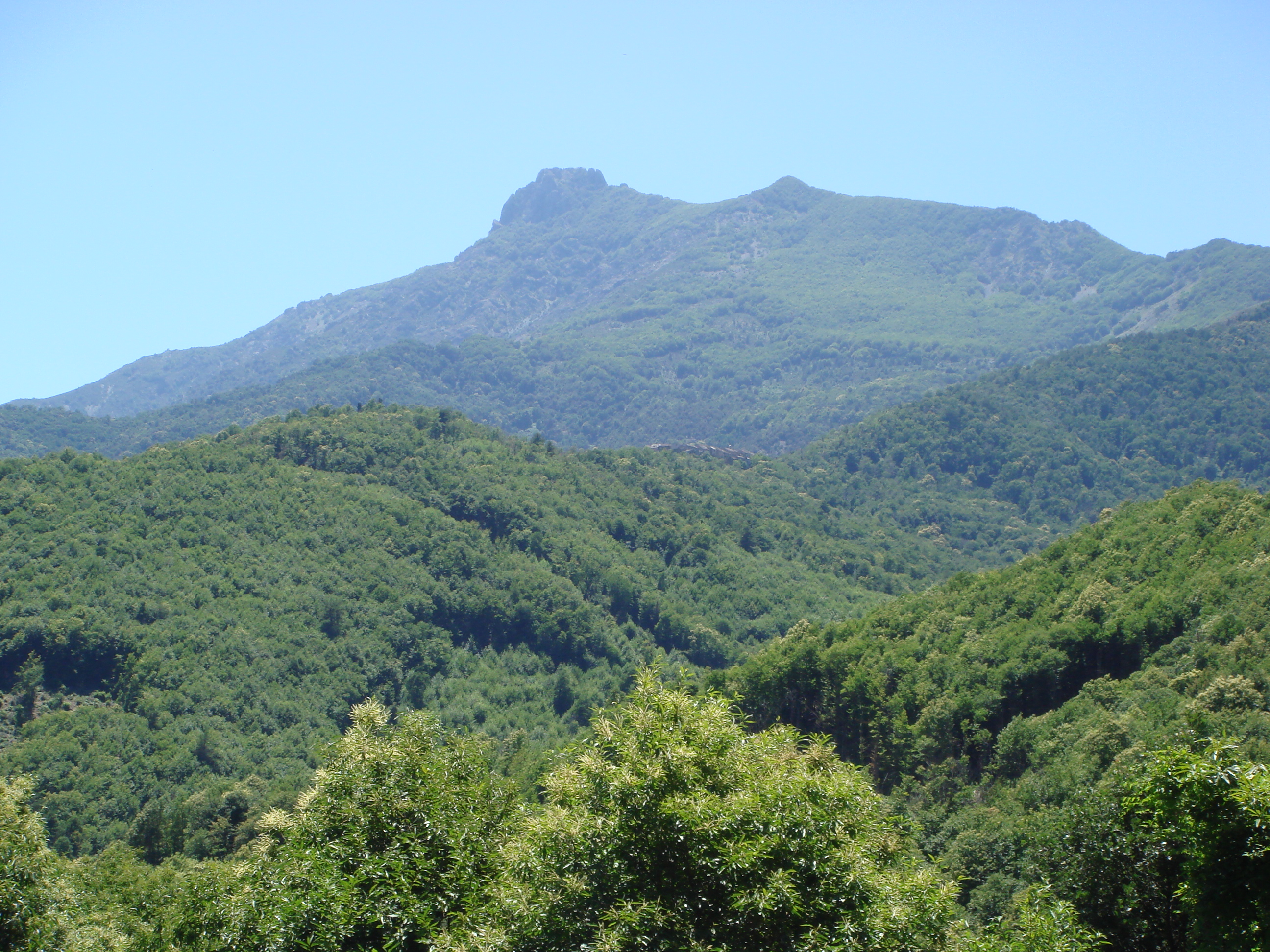
- Ampugnani valley and the San Petrone peak

Highest point
- Peak: Monte San Petrone
- Elevation: 1,731 m (5,679 ft)
- Coordinates: 42°49′41″N 9°23′9″E

Geography
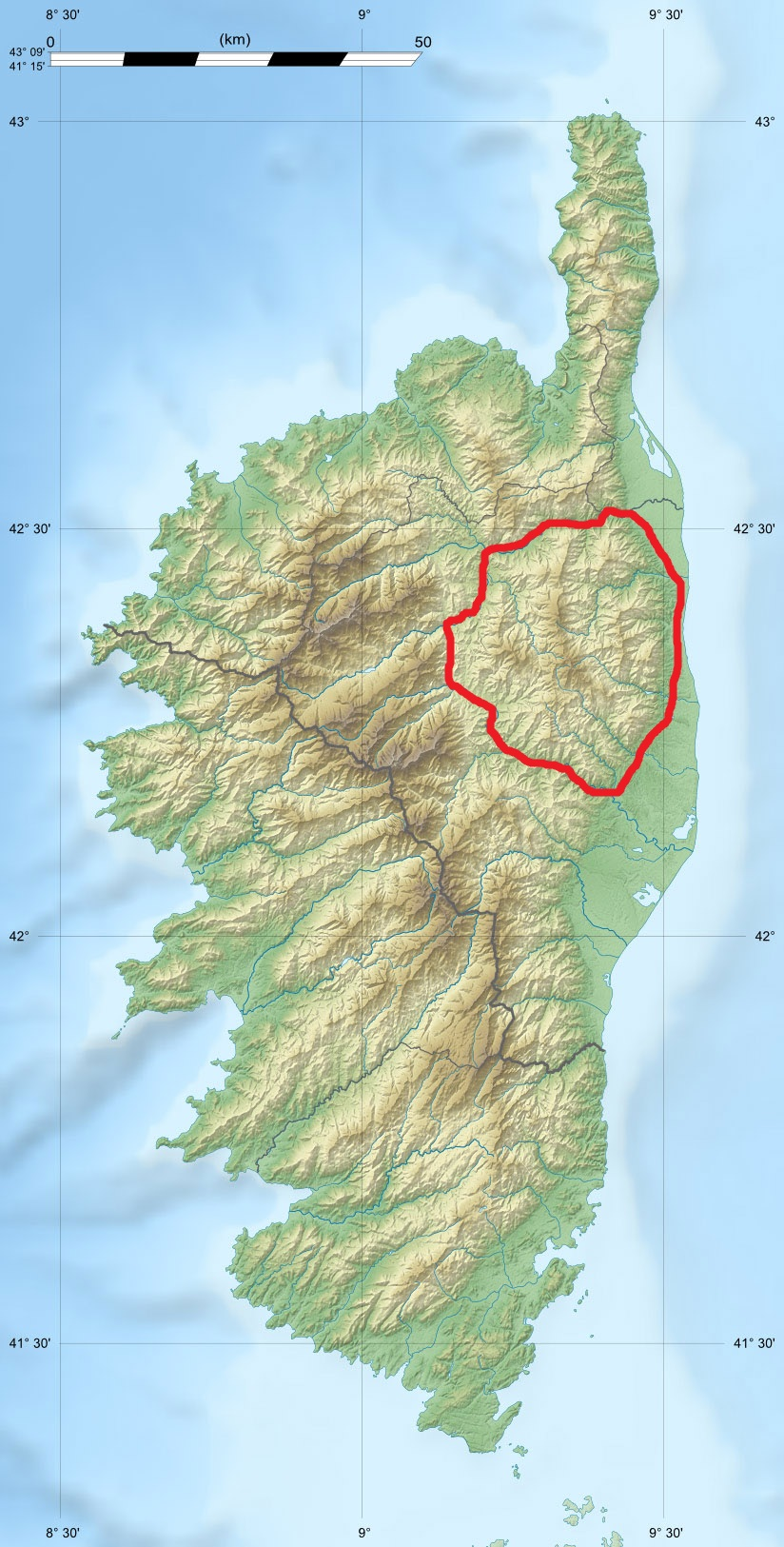
- Location: Haute-Corse, Corsica, France

The Monte San Petrone Massif (French: Massif du Monte San Petrone) is a chain of mountains in the northeast of the island of Corsica, France. It takes its name from Monte San Petrone, the highest peak.

== Geography ==
The Monte San Petrone Massif is the highest of the three medium mountain massifs in Corsica. Its highest point is Monte San Petrone with its 1,767 metres (5,797 ft) height. It is located to the east of the Monte Cinto Massif. Roughly corresponding to the Castagniccia region, it is the southern part of the Corse schisteuse or Corse alpine. To the east, it borders the coastal plain and the Tyrrhenian Sea. To the southwest, it is separated from the Monte Rotondo and Monte Renoso massifs by the valley of the Tavignano river. To the northwest, it is separated from the Monte Cinto and Monte Astu massifs by the valley of the Golo river.

== Peaks ==
The main peaks are:

Name	Elevation		Prominence	
Name	meters	feet	meters	feet
San Petrone	1,767	5,797	0	0
Les Caldane	1,731	5,679	0	0
Piano Maggiore	1,581	5,187	0	0
Olmelli	1,285	4,216	0	0
Sant'Angelo	1,218	3,996	0	0
Punta Cervio	1,189	3,901	0	0
Negrine	1,133	3,717	0	0
Sant'Appiano	1,093	3,586	0	0

== Sources ==
- Grande région écologique K Corse (PDF) (in French), IGN Agences de l'Eau, 2011
- "Les 7 massifs corses", Corse Location Villa (in French)
