= San-Lorenzo =

- Commune
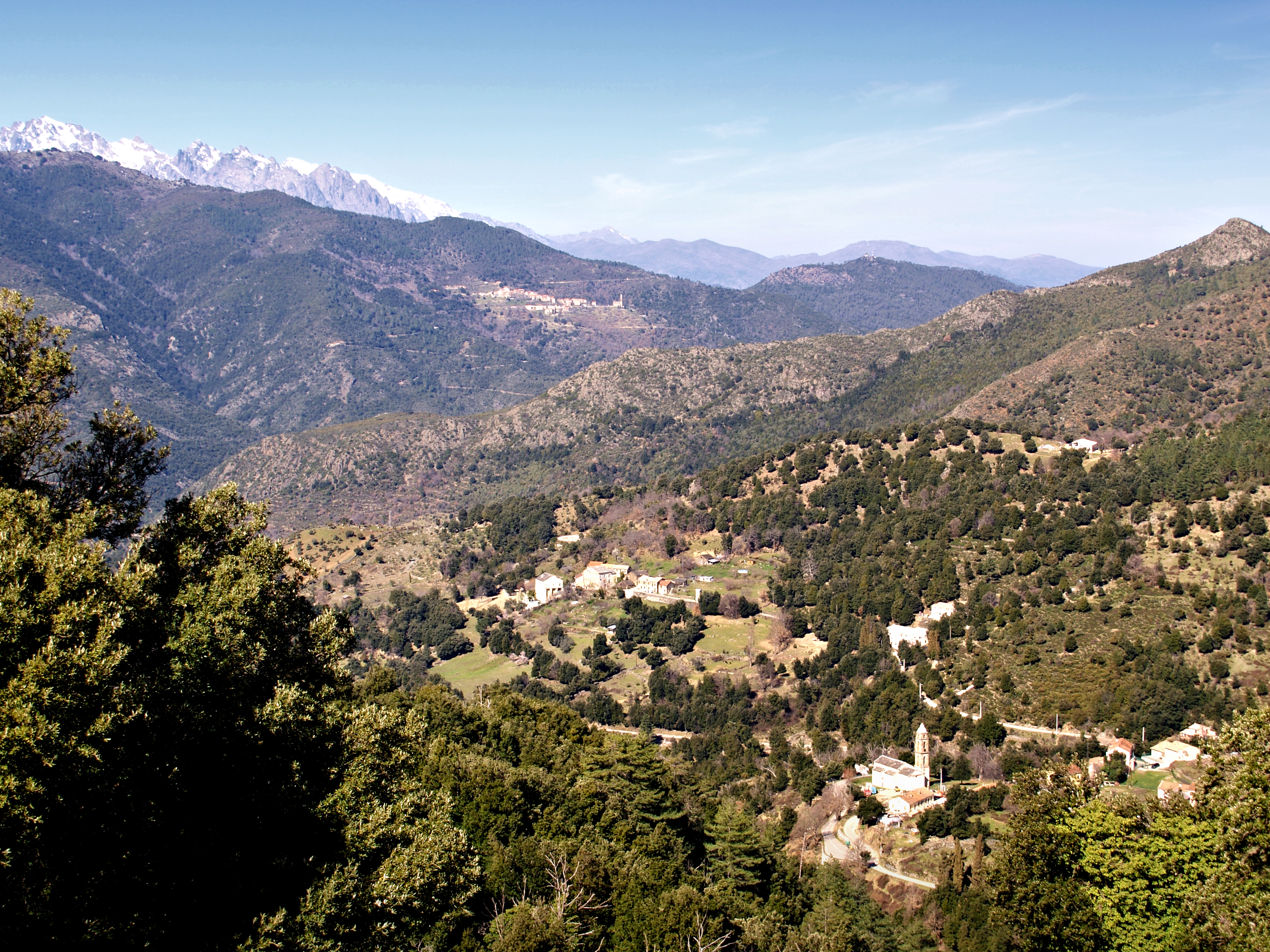
- View of the hamlets of Tribbio and Coibiti, with the village of Aiti in the background

- Coat of arms
- Location of San-Lorenzo
- Location within France Location within Corsica
- Coordinates: 42°23′06″N 9°17′28″E
- Country: France
- Region: Corsica
- Department: Haute-Corse
- Arrondissement: Corte
- Canton: Golo-Morosaglia

Government
  - Mayor (2020–2026): Jérome Negroni
- Area^{1}: 10.15 km^{2} (3.92 sq mi)
- Elevation: 700 m (2,300 ft)
- Highest elevation: 1,766 m (5,794 ft)
- Lowest elevation: 359 m (1,178 ft)
- Population (2023): 138
  - Density: 13.6/km^{2} (35.2/sq mi)
- Time zone: UTC+01:00 (CET)
  - Summer (DST): UTC+02:00 (CEST)
- INSEE/Postal code: 2B304 /20244
- ^{1} French Land Register data, which excludes lakes, ponds, glaciers > 1 km^{2} (0.386 sq mi or 247 acres) and river estuaries.

San-Lorenzo is a commune in the Haute-Corse department of France on the island of Corsica.

== Population ==
Historical population
Year	Pop.	±% p.a.
1968	215	—
1975	153	−4.74%
1982	159	+0.55%
1990	91	−6.74%
1999	106	+1.71%
2007	146	+4.08%
2012	136	−1.41%
2017	143	+1.01%
2023	138	−0.59%
Source: INSEE

== See also ==
- Communes of the Haute-Corse department
