= Albertacce =

- Commune
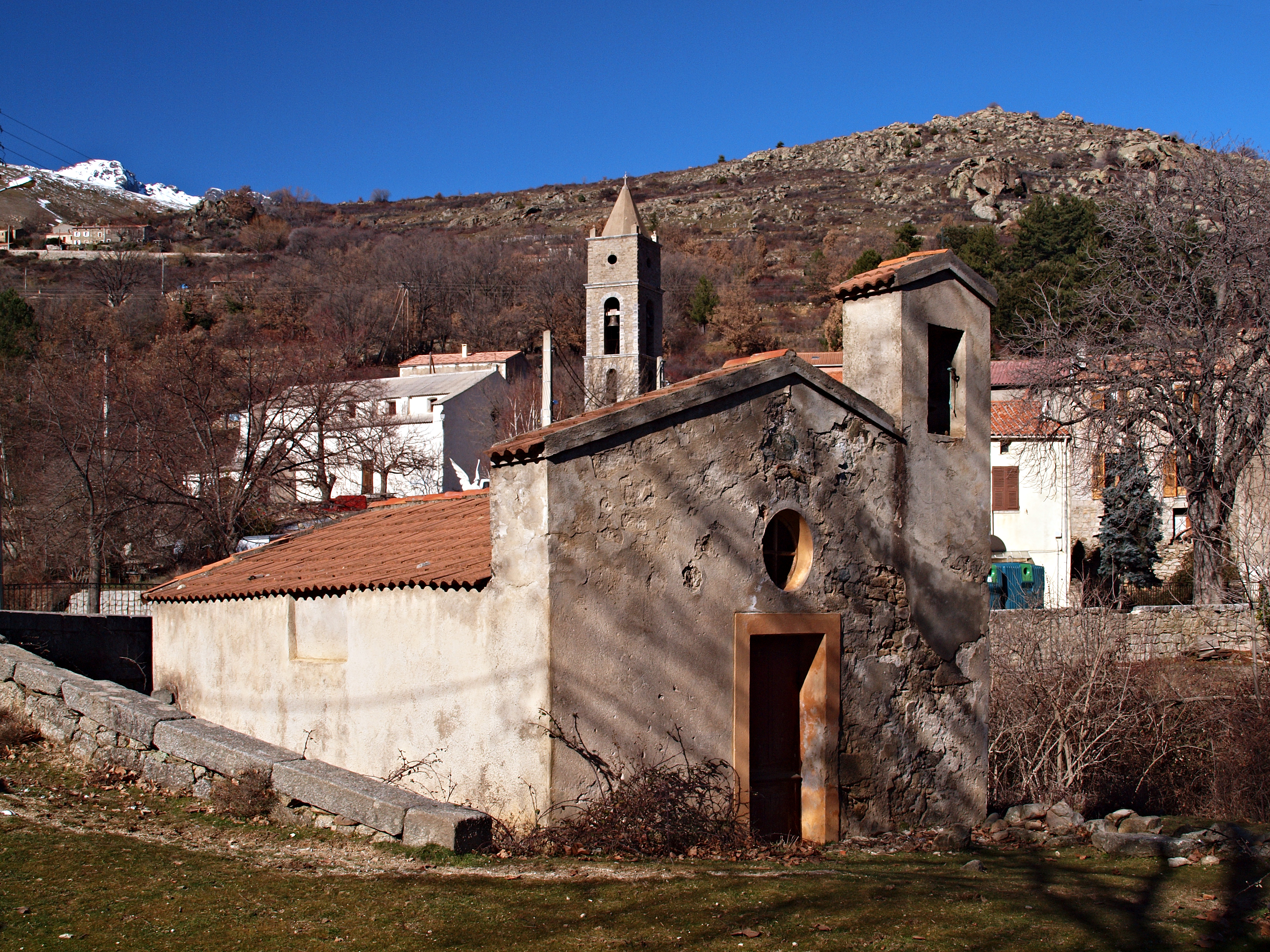
- Chapel Saint Hyacinthe
- Location of Albertacce
- Location within France Location within Corsica
- Coordinates: 42°19′41″N 8°59′04″E
- Country: France
- Region: Corsica
- Department: Haute-Corse
- Arrondissement: Corte
- Canton: Golo-Morosaglia
- Intercommunality: Pasquale Paoli

Government
  - Mayor (2020–2026): Pierre-François Albertini
- Area^{1}: 97.12 km^{2} (37.50 sq mi)
- Elevation: 867 m (2,844 ft)
- Highest elevation: 2,558 m (8,392 ft)
- Lowest elevation: 785 m (2,575 ft)
- Population (2023): 196
  - Density: 2.02/km^{2} (5.23/sq mi)
- Time zone: UTC+01:00 (CET)
  - Summer (DST): UTC+02:00 (CEST)
- INSEE/Postal code: 2B007 /20224
- ^{1} French Land Register data, which excludes lakes, ponds, glaciers > 1 km^{2} (0.386 sq mi or 247 acres) and river estuaries.

Albertacce (French pronunciation: [albɛʁtatʃe], Corsican: [alˈbɛrtatʃːe], Italian: [alˈbɛrtattʃe]) is a commune in the department of Haute-Corse in the island and collectivity of Corsica, France.

== Geography ==
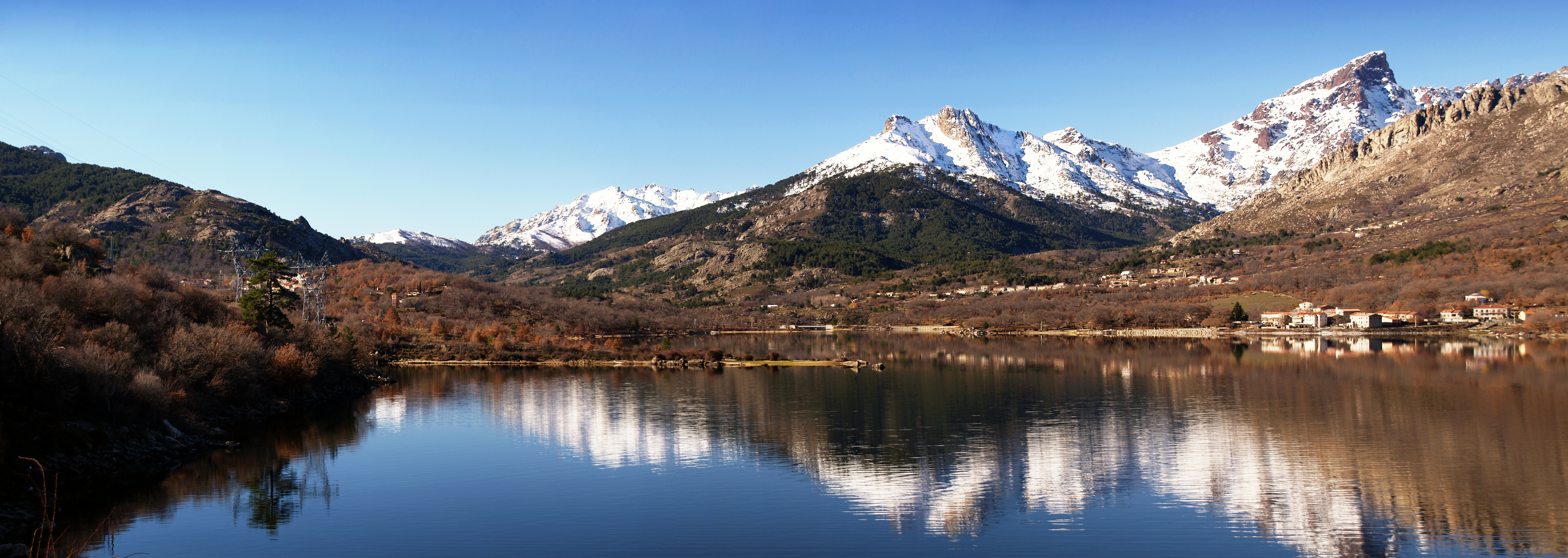
Panorama of Albertacce

Albertacce is located in the heart of the Regional Natural Park of Corsica.

=== Location ===
Albertacce is located high in the Corsican mountains some 30 km in a direct line east by north-east of Porto on the west coast and 15 km west by north-west of Corte. Access to the commune is by a single road, the D84.

=== Relief ===
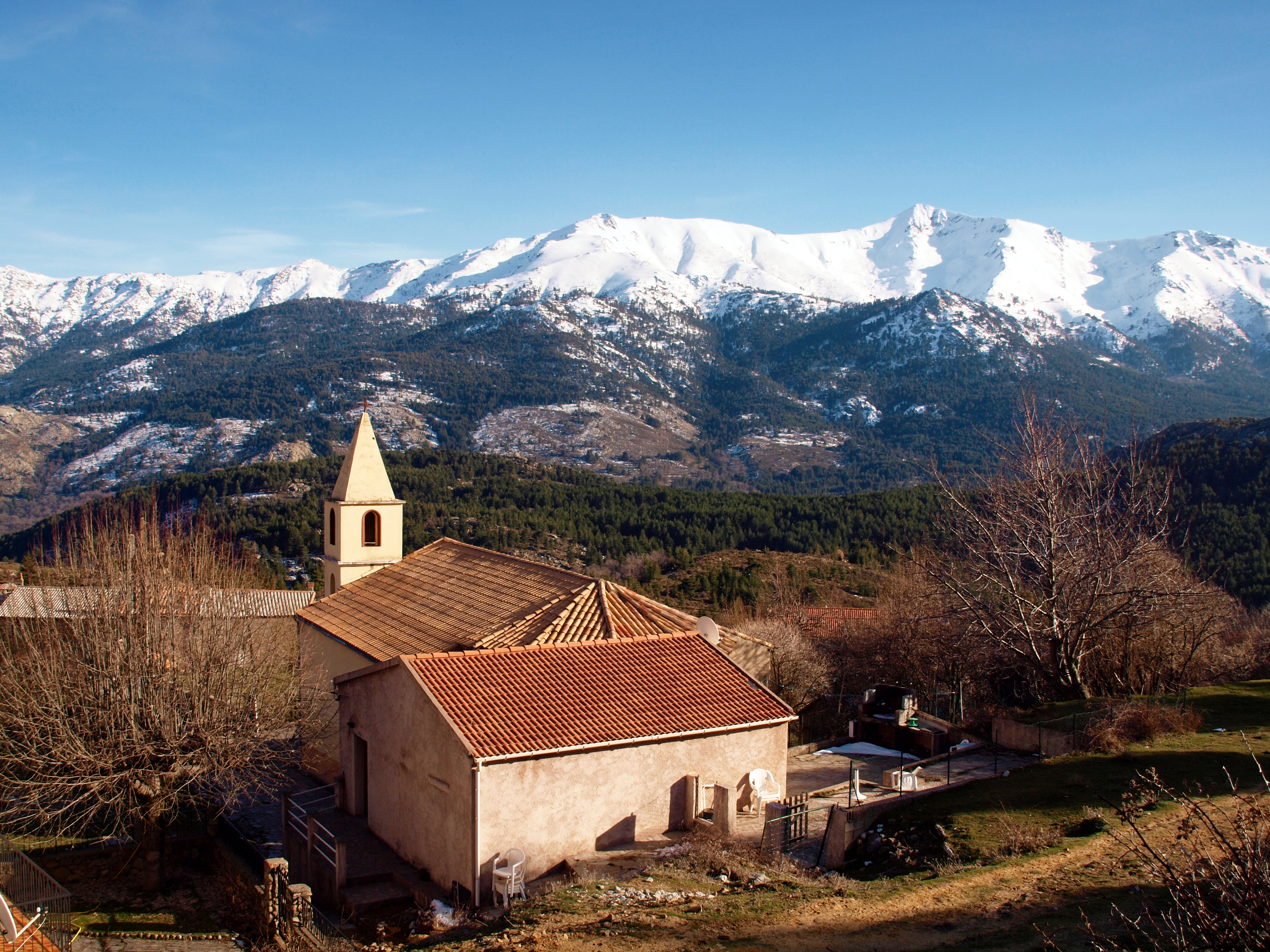
View of Punta Artica from Calasima

The commune occupies the southwest part of Niolu surrounded by a vast mountainous circle formed of high peaks in the watershed of Golo. Its boundaries are marked as follows:

- to the north and west: by the main mountain range of Corsica, the massif of Cinto with Paglia Orba (2525 m), Capu Tafunatu (2335 m), Capu ae Gharghiole (2105 m), Capu di Guargnerola (1967 m), Punta Cricche (2057 m), the col de Vergio (1478 m), Capu a Rughia (1712 m), Bocca San Pedru (1452 m)
- to the south by the mountains of the Rotondo mountain range, its limits being delineated by the peaks U-Tritore (1725 m) (the southernmost summit), Punta Artica (2327 m) and Capu-di-a-Facciatu (2113 m)
- to the east by a line to the north from Capu-di-a-Facciatu, through Castellu Montone (1493 m), the fold of Tileri (1040 m), joining the Golo downstream of Ponte Altu and along the river to Lake Calacuccia. This line bypasses the village of Albertacce and the hamlets of Pietra-Zitamboli and goes back to Punta Crucetta (2,499 m) along a ridge through Capigliole a e Furchelle (1401 m), Capu di Villa (2184 m) and Capu Falu (2540 m).

In the midst of the basin of shallow siliceous soil which lies on a Hercynian granite base, is the Forest of Valdu Niellu, a vast forest of Corsican pine traversed by the Golo and which occupies the western part of the commune.

To the northeast of Valdu Niellu, between the mountains of Cinto and a ridge linking Crucetta Punta (2499 m), Capu Falu (2540 m), Capu di Inzecca (2299 m), the Cresta di l 'Inzecche, Monte Albanu (2018 m), and the remarkable Cinque Frati (1986 m) is the upper valley of Viru a tributary of the Golo.

The western slopes of the valley are covered by the communal forest of Albertacce composed mainly of Corsican pine. The pine is called lariciu ("a large" in Corsican language) is part of the large family of black pines. It can occur at altitudes between 1000 and 1800 m on sunny slopes. There are nuthatches, non-migratory birds which live on the tree trunks moving head down. There are 2,000 pairs in Corsica.

Along the length of Valdu Niellu on the southern slope of the col de Vergio is another remarkable Corsican pine forest: the Forest of Aïtone (Évisa).

Towards the peaks on the shady side, between 1600 and 2100 metres, pushes the fragrant alder trees (bassu in Corsican). These are shrubs without trunks and rarely exceeds 3 metres high. Its leaves are sticky and its branches were once used by shepherds to cover their huts. The forest is said to be impenetrable. In February the first Crocus corsicus can be seen on the mountains, species unique to the islands of Corsica and Sardinia. On the heights mouflons can be seen from the colony of Cinto.

=== Hydrography ===
The hydrographic network includes numerous streams and springs. The river Golo rises from 1991 metres in the commune south of the Paglia Orba (2525 m) and 200 m to the south of the Capu Tafunatu (2335 m). Its course is interrupted by the Calacuccia Dam. It leaves the commune 200 metres upstream of the Mazzola bridge on the D218 road. The Viru, the main tributary of the commune, is fed by several streams such as that of Paglia Orba and Foggiale bordered in part by the GR 20. At the bottom of the creek beds, there are native species: the Tyrrhenian painted frogs (a bariulata) - toads living up to 1900 m and Corsican brook salamanders (a Tarantella). The Corsican brook salamander has no lungs. It breathes through the skin and mouth.

=== Habitat ===
The small population of Albertacce is divided between the Albertacce village and the hamlet Pietra Zitamboli, the village Calasima, and in the forest of Valdu Niellu.

==== Albertacce Village (E Lupertacce) ====
The village is built on a gentle slope towards the river Golo in a chestnut grove. Although near Lake Calacuccia, the town does not border the lake. The houses are partly grouped with the shops around the parish church, others are aligned along the D84.

The old buildings were built with red tile roofs and walls built of gray granite. Some massive houses in the baroque style were formerly houses for nobles.

Albertacce has a water tank and a sewage treatment plant.

==== Pietra (A Petra) and Zitamboli (Zitàmbuli) ====
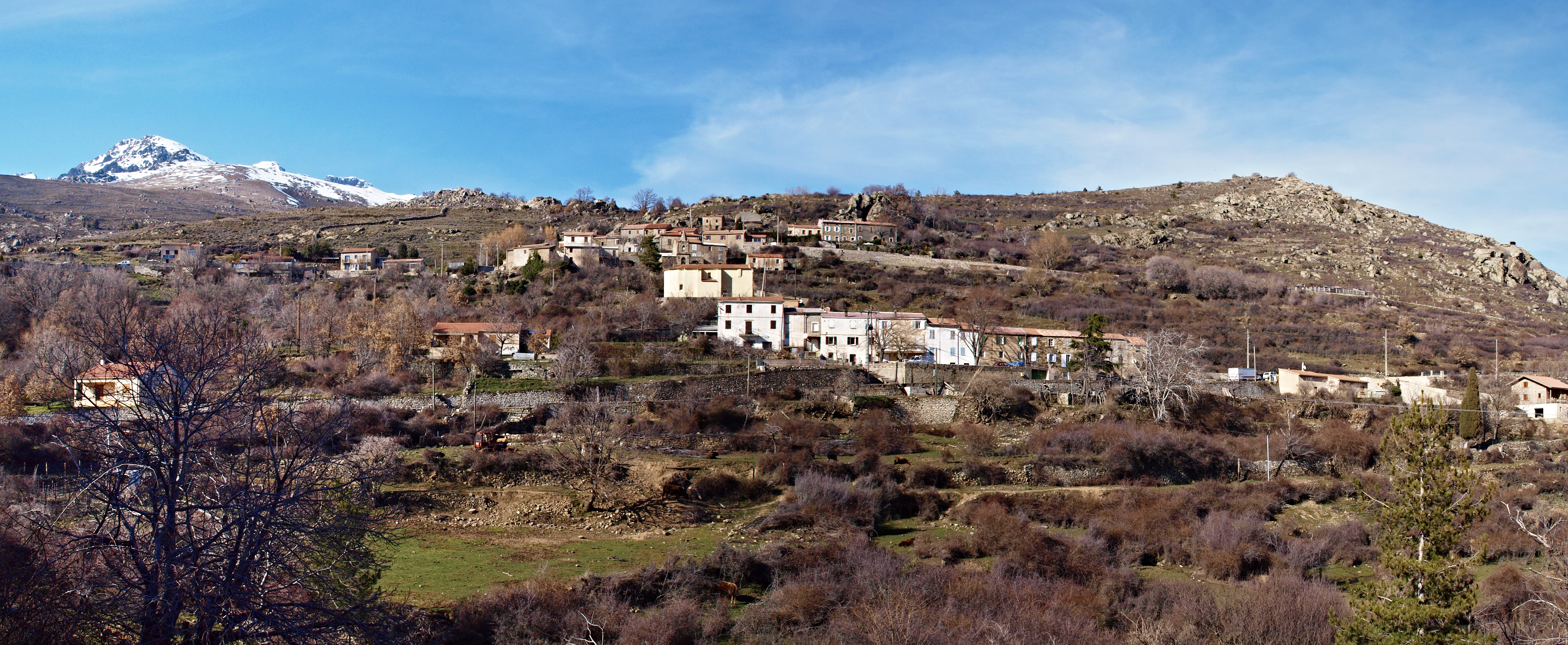
Panorama of Pietra-Zitamboli

Pietra and Zitamboli are two neighbouring hamlets northwest of the village of Albertacce, Zitamboli being located below Pietra. Between the two, a church was built. Its bell tower is similar to that of the parish church of the village and those of neighbouring towns. Access is difficult - both villages are served by the small road D318 that leads to Calasima.

==== Calasima (Calasima) ====
Built at 1100 m altitude, Calasima is the highest village in Corsica. Today a hamlet of Albertacce, this village has houses clustered around its church, war memorial and cemetery. Calasima is equipped with a water tank and a sewage treatment plant.

The hamlet is a rare example of a cold-summer mediterranean climate.

==== Valdu Niellu ====
The vast forest Valdu Niellu has some residents. The 2nd Foreign Parachute Regiment of the Foreign Legion has a chalet at Vergio for their training in the mountains. At Poppaghja there is a forester's house belonging to the ONF.

=== Access ===
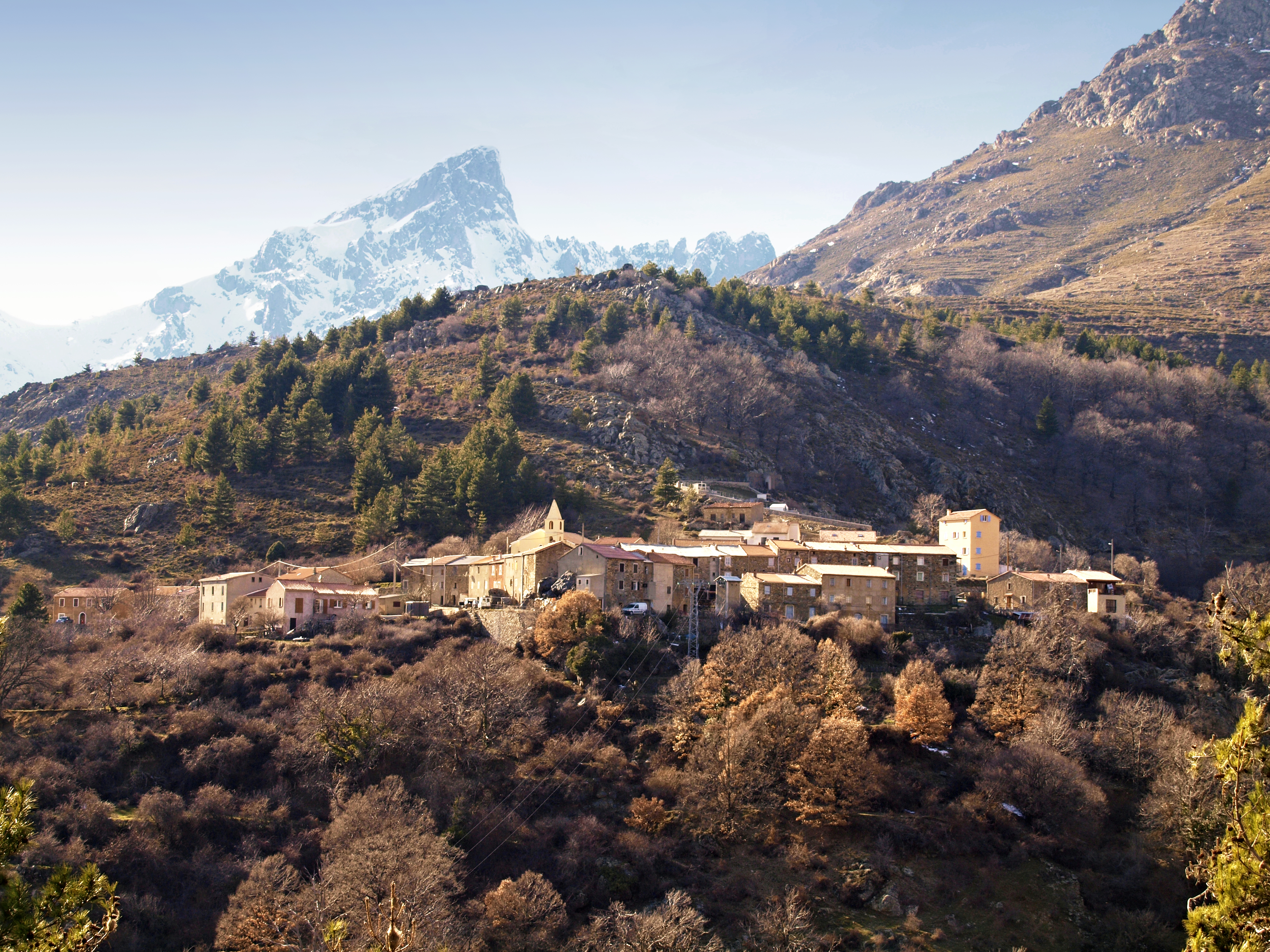
View of Calasima

Access to Albertacce is by the D84 road which is the only road which crosses the Niolu and serves all the communes of the microregion.

== History ==
=== Prehistory ===
Excavations undertaken since 2006 on the site of A Curnatoghja at Albertacce and also at Sidossi close to the hamlet of Calacuccia on a spur called E Mizane on the lakefront, have revealed some archaeological finds which attest to human presence at the end the Neolithic and the Bronze Age. These include fragments of ceramics, stone tools like shards, a scraper and arrowheads.

The Archaeological Museum of Niolu of Lucien Acquaviva at Albertacce is intended to highlight the specific terminology of megalithic Corsican. A Menhir statue (a stantara) of a Niolu "soldier" wearing a suit of armour, a breastplate of the Peoples of the sea, and a dagger was discovered during the demolition of the chapel of Saint-Jean Baptiste which was decided on in 1985 by the City Council of Calacuccia. This stone called Ghjuvan Battista III was incorporated with two other menhirs into the walls of the chapel Saint-Jean Baptiste of Calacuccia that was next to the church when it was built in the 12th century, probably to confirm the victory of the Catholic religion over pagan rites because in the 7th century, Pope Gregory I claimed that he had repressed the "cult of stones" in Corsica.

=== Antiquity ===
According to Ptolemy Corsica was inhabited by twelve nations who, for the indigenous majority, had not been subject to Roman influence to a great extent. Niolu was inhabited by the Licnini, a people who occupied the middle basin of the Golo. Masters of the Casacconi and Ampugnani countries they returned to the mountains, populating the cantons of Caccia and Niolo. The Greeks used the term "Lieninoï" to refer to the people.

=== Middle Ages ===
It is also likely that the Saracen colonies of Corte and Balagne, harassed by Christian patriots, were driven back into Niolu where significant names of Calaguccia and Calasima were applied to two villages.

In the 16th century around 1520, the Pieve of Niolu was uninhabited. The Bank of Saint George, which had managed Corsica since 1453, used the troops of Nicolo Doria in 1503 to destroy the houses in the villages of Lozzi, L'Acquale, Erco, Corscia, Calacuccia, Casamaccioli, Sidossi, and Erbechincieby.

The Bank of Saint George did the same with the neighbouring Pieve of Sia (formed by the valley of Porto), ordering the depopulation Sia due to the non-submission of its inhabitants to the Lordship of Leca burning houses and crops.

=== Modern times ===
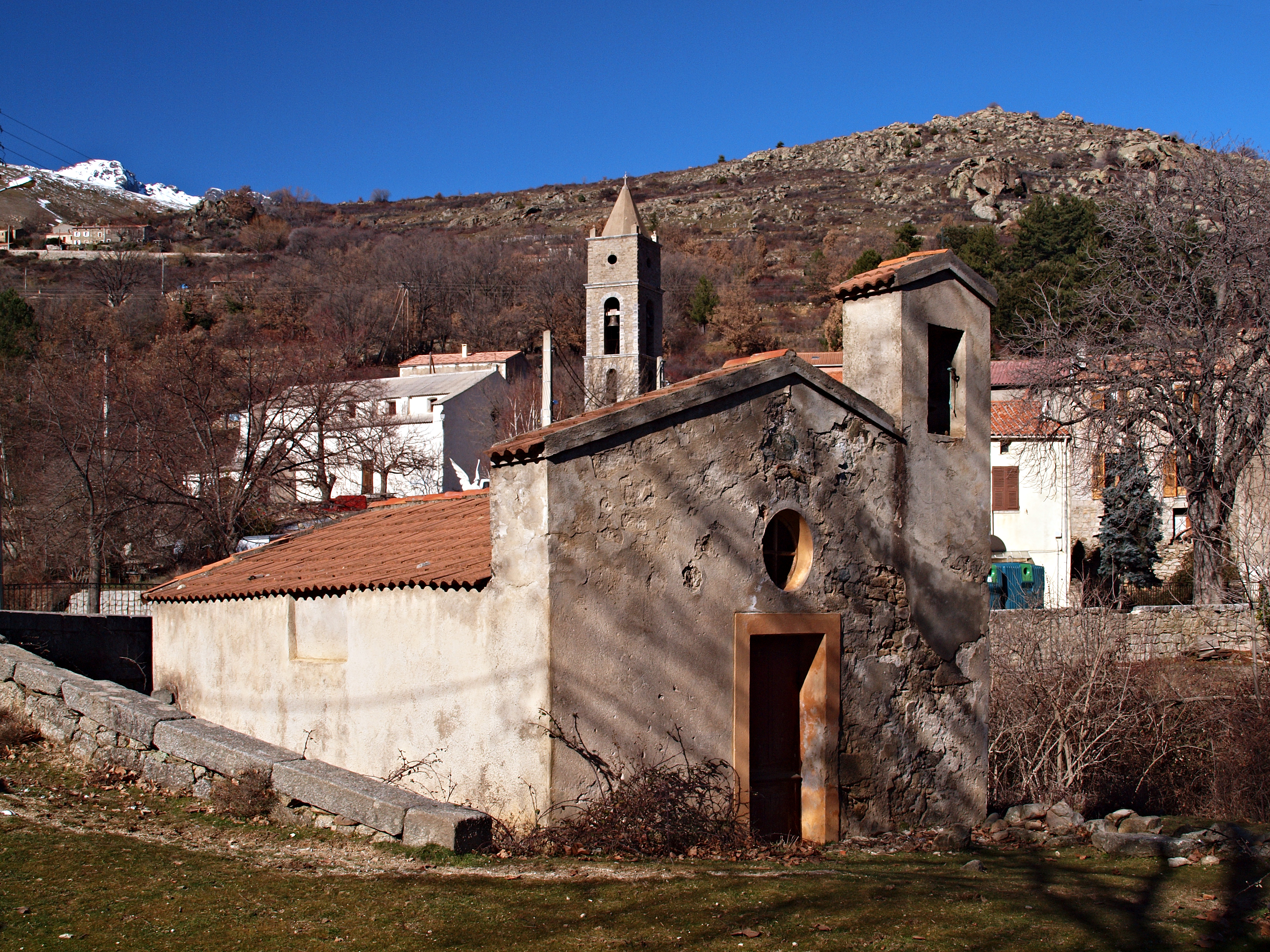
Chapel of Saint-Hyacinthe

From 1729 Niolu took part in the uprising against Genoa, creating unrest in opposing the publication of judicial decisions. In early March 1730 the people of Niolu occupied Vicu and seized 200 guns in the house of the Lieutenant. On the night of 29 to 30 March 1734, Castineta attacked, at Camputile (Niolu), Ghjacumu Santu Petriconi at the head of 300 Genoese troops - Greeks for the most part - and forced him to retreat to Vicu.

On 13 January 1739 Lieutenant-General Jean-Baptiste Francois des Marets, marquis de Maillebois was appointed army commander of the King in Corsica and he came to Corsica. On 24 June of the same year Niolu submitted to General Maillebois.

From 30 July to 1 August 1751, deputies and prosecutors from the Pieve assembled in Oletta and signed an act of submission to the Republic of Genoa, an act by which the King of France tried to make favourable for the Corsicans. Troops were ready to occupy the Niolu which remained refractory. At the last moment its inhabitants made their submission on 13 August 1751.

On 15 May 1768 the Genoese ceded Corsica to France.

After the conquest of the island by the French troops of Louis XV in 1769, Niolu experienced savage military repression. The French subdued nascent revolts under the Generalship of Pasquale Paoli. At the convent of Saint-François-di-Niolu (in Corsican Conventu San Francescu) at Calacuccia eleven Niolins were hanged from the chestnut trees of the convent on 23 June 1774 on the orders of General Sionville including a man from Albertacce. His name Ghjuvanni Albertini is mentioned on the commemorative plaque at the entrance of the convent.

With the French Revolution that created the department of Corsica with Bastia as prefecture, the Pieve of Niolu became the Canton of Calacuccia in 1789.

In 1793, the National Convention divided the island into two departments: Golo which included Albertacce and Liamone. These were reunited in 1804 by Napoleon I who reestablished the department of Corsica.

=== Contemporary era ===
In 1954, Albertacce became part of the canton of Calacuccia which consists of the communes of: Albertacce, Calacuccia, Casamaccioli, Corscia, and Lozzi.

Between 1971 and 1973 new cantons were created including the canton of Niolu-Omessa created by the forced merger of the former cantons of Omessa and Calacuccia.

== Economy ==
The Niolu is a micro-region in the central north-west of Corsica to the west of Corte. It consists of the communes of Corscia, Calacuccia, Albertacce (E Lubertacce), Lozzi, and Casamaccioli (Casamacciuli). It is located in the Regional Natural Park of Corsica and has always been a land of shepherds and traditions.

The Niolu economy was, until the last century, dominated by pastoralism with regular movements of herds of goats and mouflons in search of pastures. In early autumn shepherds drove their animals to the coastal plains and at the end of spring, they climbed back to the mountain pastures.

The cheese niulincu (Niolo in French) must be tried to really know its character. It has a soft texture but to be really good, it should be a little firm, smooth, and without holes, and be refined throughout its thickness. The old "Migration way" started from Barghiana (Manso), but it can be taken from the end of the D351 road, passing by the Ponte di e Rocce, the col de Caprunale, the refuge of Puscaghia of the PNRC (Évisa), and Capu Tafunatu towards the Col de Vergio in the Albertacce commune.

Although agro-pastoralism fell sharply in the Niolu, there are still a few shepherds who now produce cheeses to modern standards. Charcuterie and chestnut flour are also produced in the commune. The mountains attract more and more visitors and tourism brings new resources to the people and creates jobs.

Nowadays migration trails are almost abandoned. However farms (pigs, goats and more recently cattle) have developed, becoming the main activity of the commune. At the exit to the village to the col de Vergio animals are present in pens and also on the road.

The ski resort of Vergio (Campu di neve) is 22 km from the village and about 1 km before the col de Vergio (1478 m). It does not have as much snow as the resorts of continental Europe. The reason is both a low number of days of snowfall, a thick layer of light snow most of the time, and the slopes are too short - insufficient to satisfy the customers.

In addition, on May 11, 2010, the fishing association "AAPPMA A NIULINCA" moved its headquarters to the town hall of Albertacce. This association, which has 150 members covering the five communes of the canton, manages the aquatic environment of the region where the Golo rises.

== Administration ==
Albertacce is one of the five towns of Niolu and part of the canton of Golo-Morosaglia.

List of successive mayors of Albertacce

| From | To | Name |
|---|---|---|
| 2001 | 2026 | Pierre-François Albertini |

== Population ==
Historical population
| Year | Pop. | ±% p.a. |
|---|---|---|
| 1968 | 373 | — |
| 1975 | 357 | −0.62% |
| 1982 | 323 | −1.42% |
| 1990 | 200 | −5.82% |
| 1999 | 200 | +0.00% |
| 2007 | 226 | +1.54% |
| 2012 | 215 | −0.99% |
| 2017 | 200 | −1.44% |
| 2023 | 196 | −0.34% |
Source: INSEE

== Sites and monuments ==
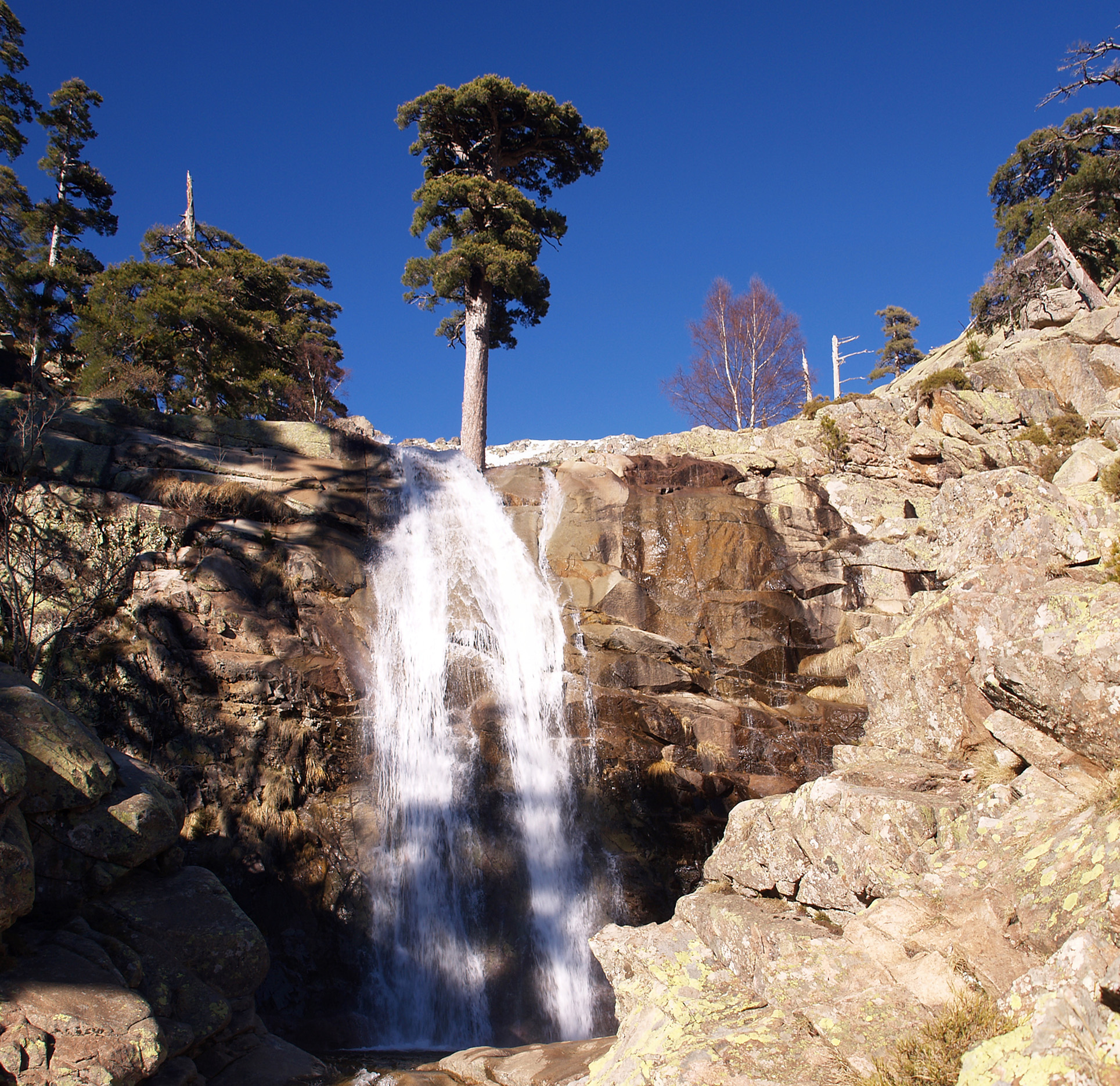
Radule Waterfall in the forest of Valdu-Niellu

=== Natural sites ===
==== Golo river ====
The Golo arises in the extreme west of the commune. It traverses the forest of Valdu Niellu and creates the remarkable Radule Waterfall very close to the GR 20. Further downstream it flows under the bridge of San Rimeriu where the sheep pens of Tillarga are and the ruins of the San Rimeriu chapel. At the approach to the village of Albertacce it passes under the bridge on the D84 road then under the Altu bridge which is a remarkable abandoned Genovese bridge. In summer, the natural pools of Golo are cool havens for the villagers and tourists.

==== Forest of Valdu Niellu ====
The territorial forest of Valdu Niellu is backed in the North by the main mountain range of Corsica and on the Northwest flanks of the Rotondo mountain range. It is mostly composed of European black pine with other resinous trees such as birch and fragrant alders (bassu).

==== Calasima ====
Calasima is a remarkable village - the highest in Corsica at 1100 m altitude.

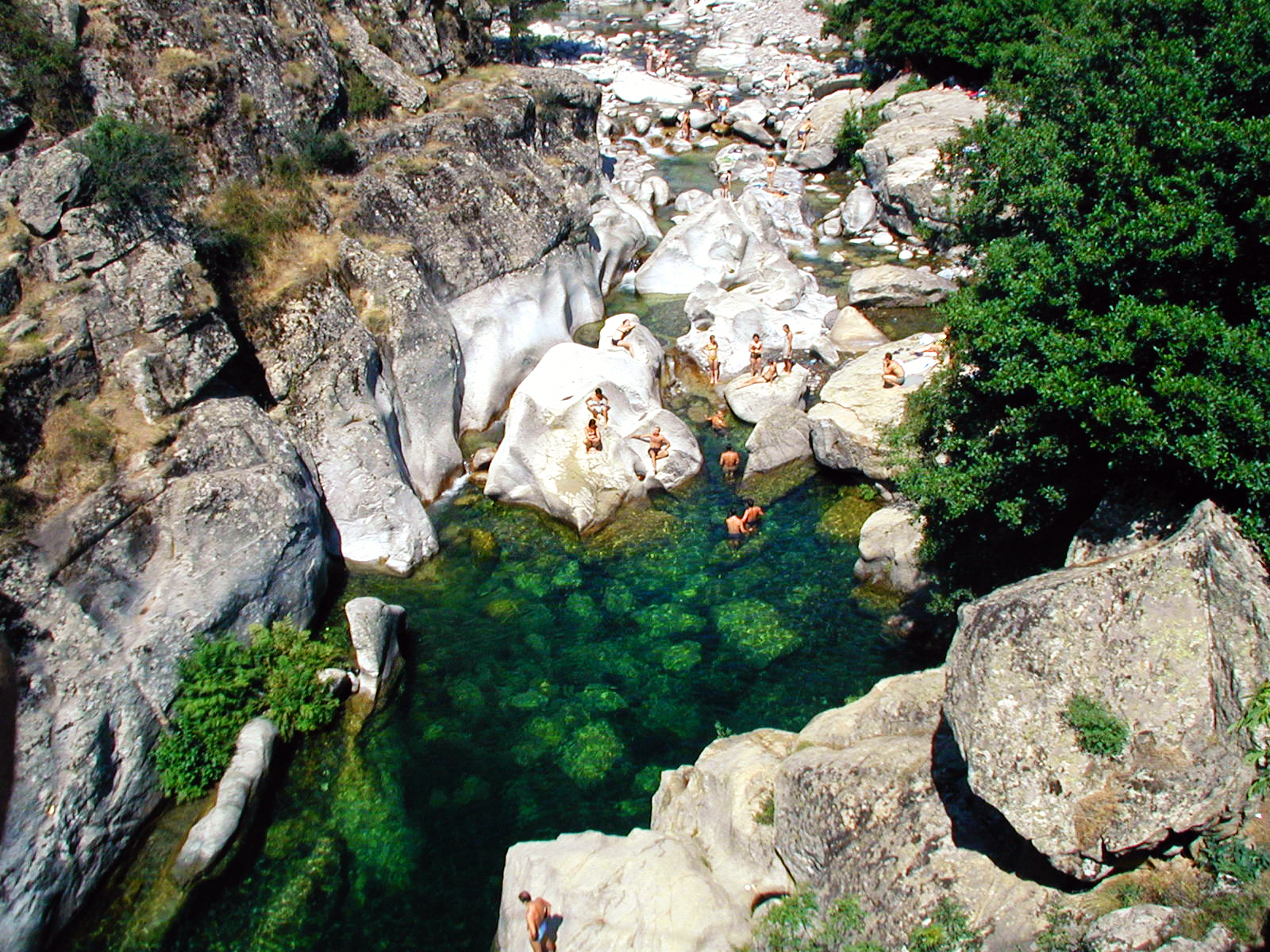
The Golo upstream of Ponte Altu

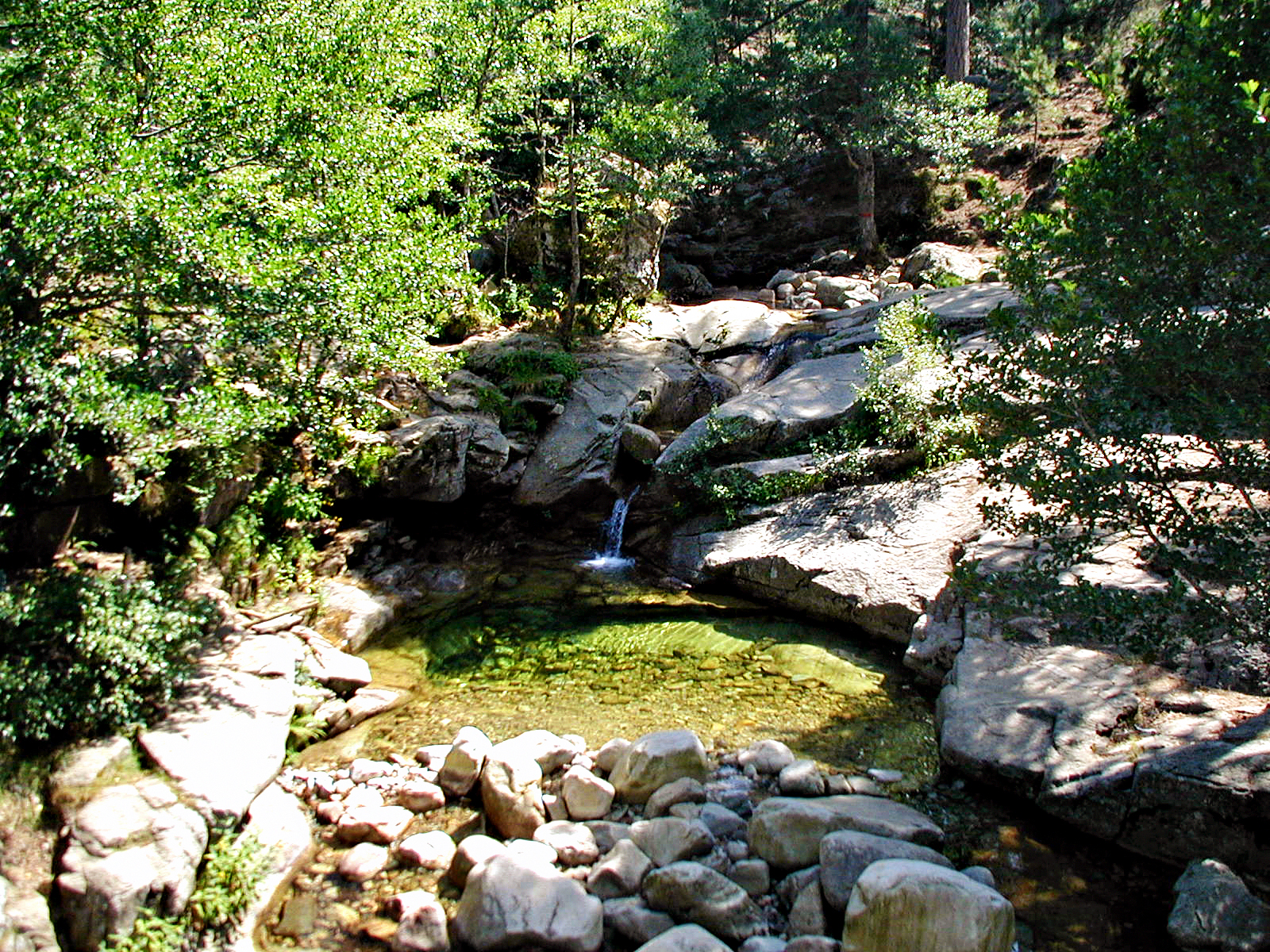
Cuccagna stream in the forest of Valdu Niellu

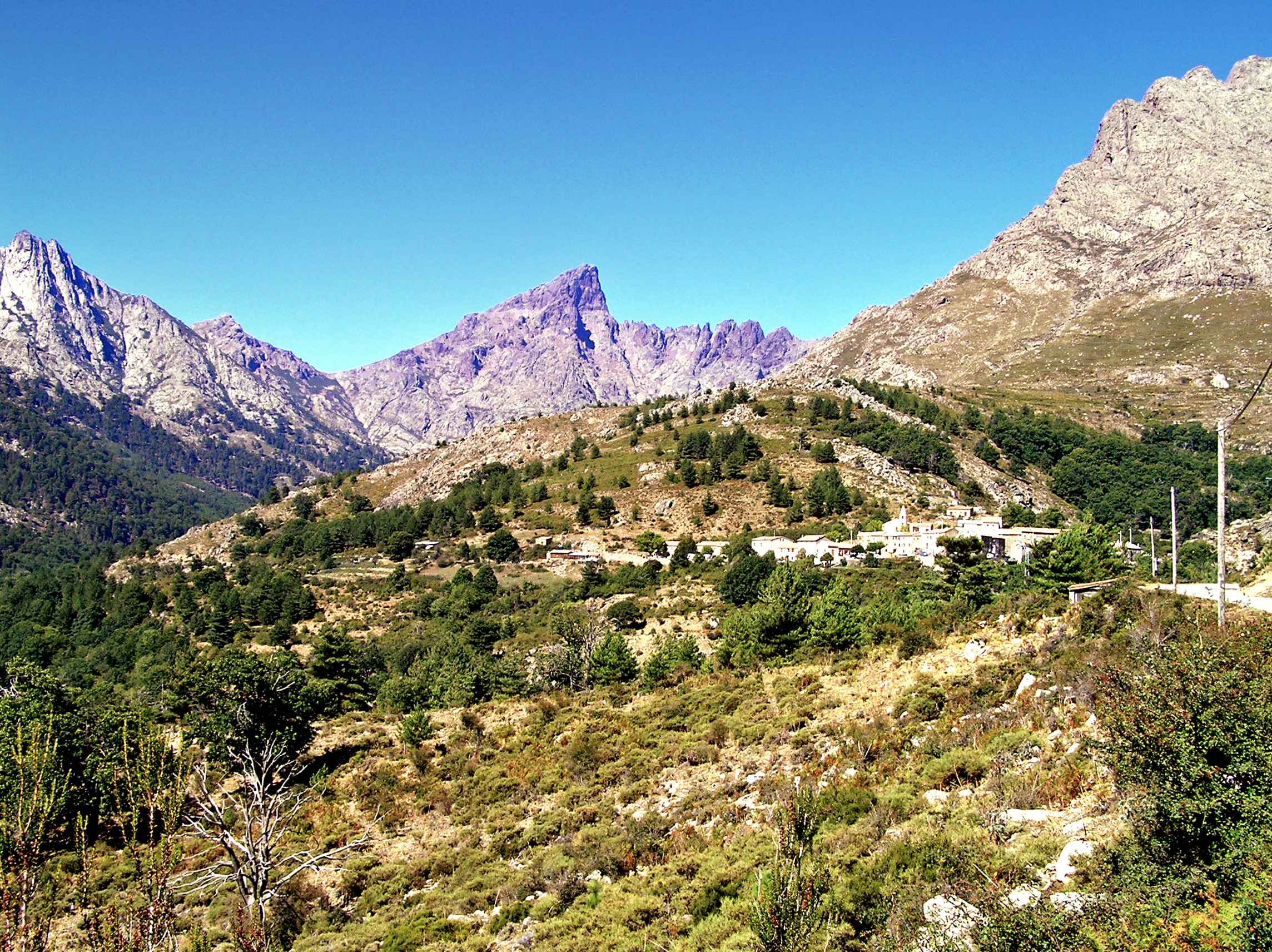
The Villages of Calasima and Paglia Orba

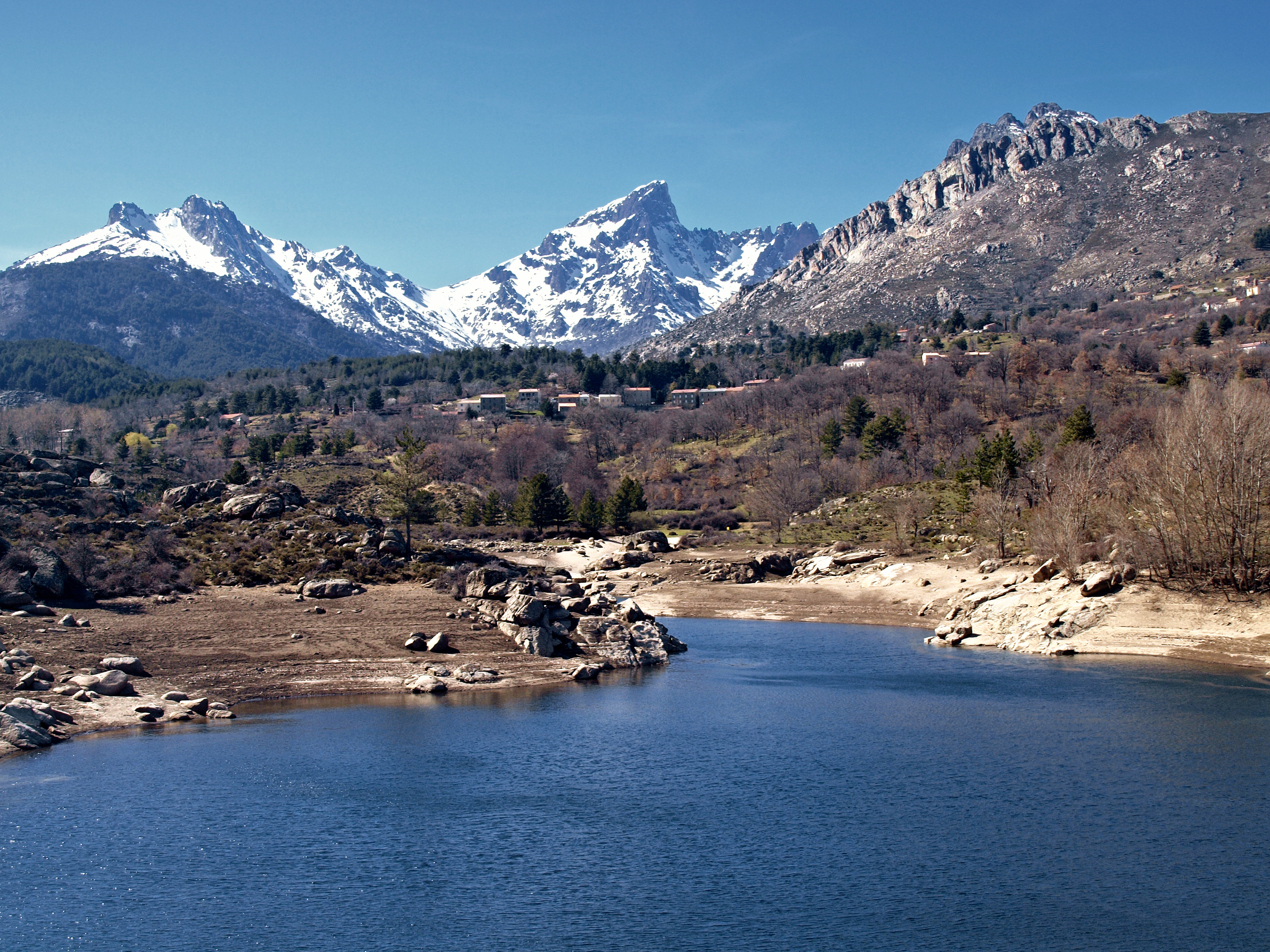
The Golo at Lake Calacuccia

=== Civil architecture ===
==== Ponte Altu ====
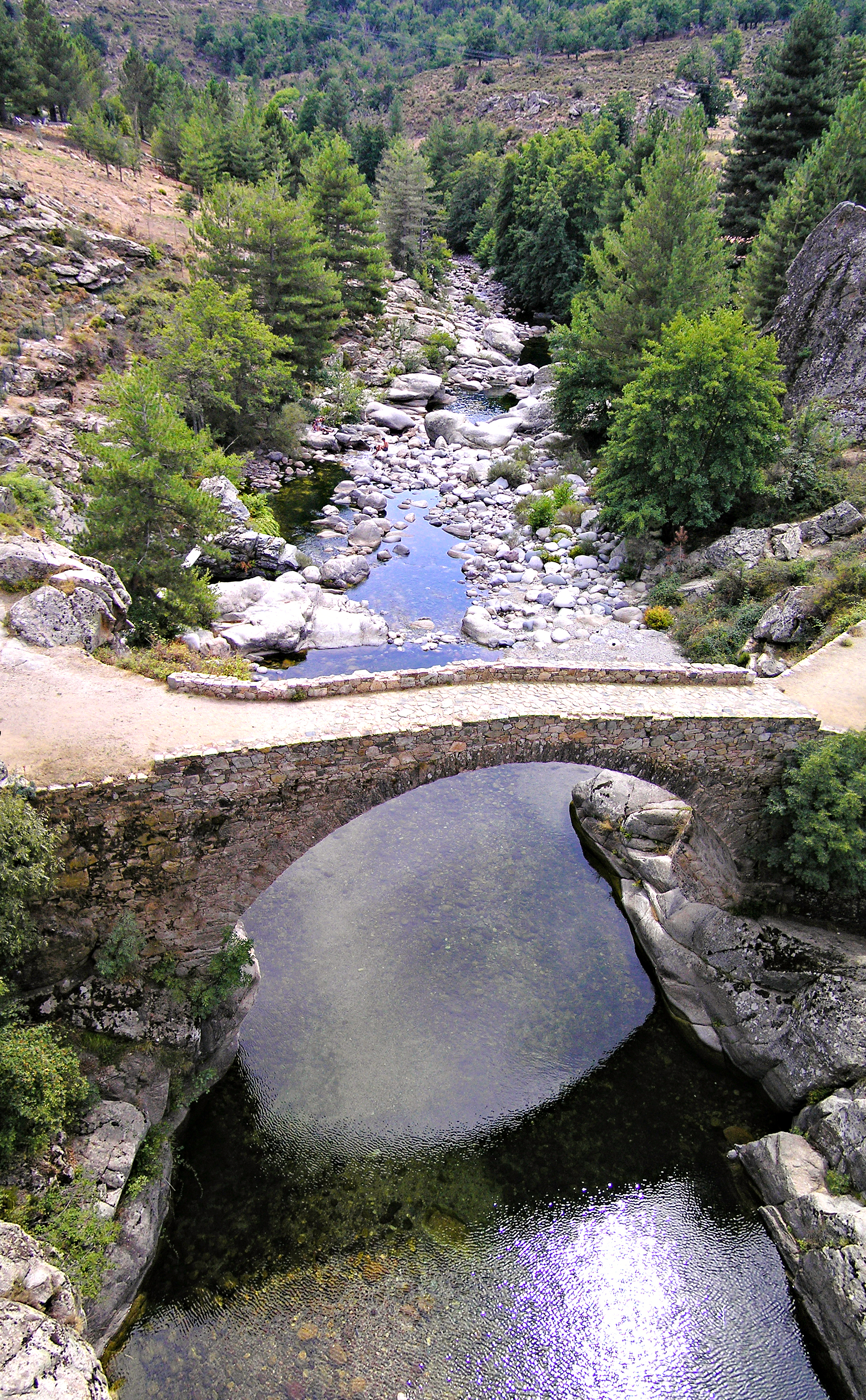
Altu Bridge

Ponte Altu is a Genovese bridge over the Golo downstream from the D84 highway bridge.

==== Pont de Muricciolu ====
This Genovese bridge (Ponte Muricciolu) on the Viru, tributary of the Golo, is located at 852 m above sea level, 1 km towards the vol d'oiseau in the North-east of Ponte Altu and upstream of the confluence of the Viru with the stream of Valdellu. Close to the bridge is an oratory. Both are located on the way to the GR Mare a Mare Nord.

==== Others ====
- The Statue of Christ the King at the col de Vergio (1478 m) a monolith 6 metres high carved from a block of pink Corsican granite, with a total height from the base of 9.50 metres. It is the work of the Corsican sculptor Noël Bonardi. It is in the commune of Albertacce, bordering the commune of Évisa along the D84 road. There is a parking area so that the breathtaking scenery can be admired to the full: the Niolu with Lake Calacuccia, the surrounding peaks of the Cinto mountains, and an appreciation of the extent of the vast forests of Valdu Niellu and Aïtone.
- The Calasima War Memorial, located at the entrance of the hamlet. It is the highest war memorial in Corsica, erected at 1093 m altitude.

=== Sacred architecture ===
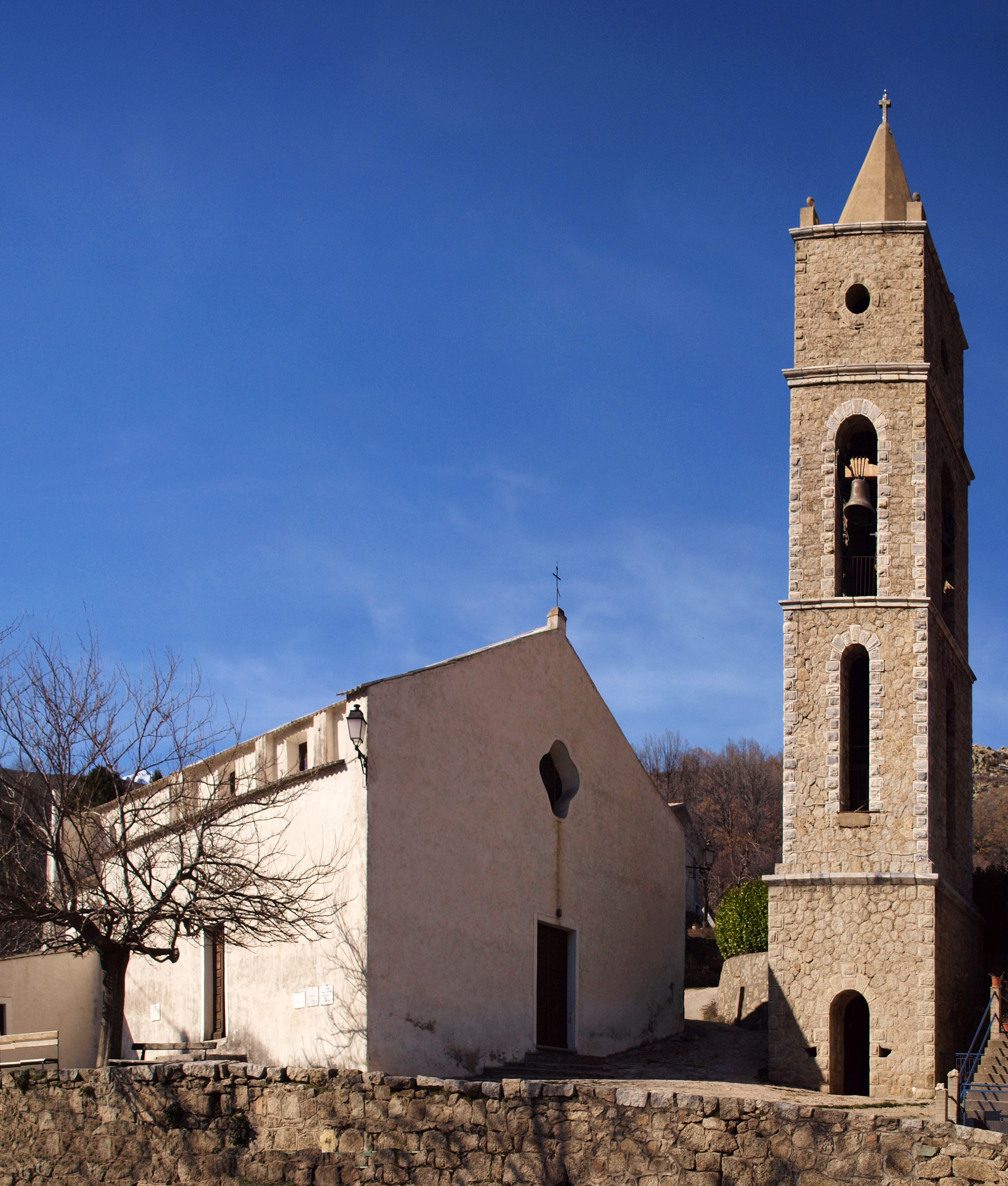
Church of Santa Maria

- The 'Parish Church of Saint Mary (Santa Maria) with an isolated bell and exposed stone. The church walls are plastered. On the front right side there are marble plaques on which are inscribed the names of the clergy (priests, deans, canons, and vicars) buried there.
- The Chapel of Saint-Hyacinthe (San Ghjacintu), a building from the 17th century. Located near the parish church, it houses the statue of Saint Roch which was placed there due to lack of space in the parish church.
- The Chapel of Saint-Roch (San Roccu) at the old village.
- The Church of Pietra-Zitamboli. This small church is located between the two hamlets, on a short but steep slope. It has a remarkable door.
- The Church of Calasima. Its bell tower is identical to those of many churches in Niolu.
- The Chapel of San Rimeriu, a ruined chapel about 1050 m above sea level along the Golo.
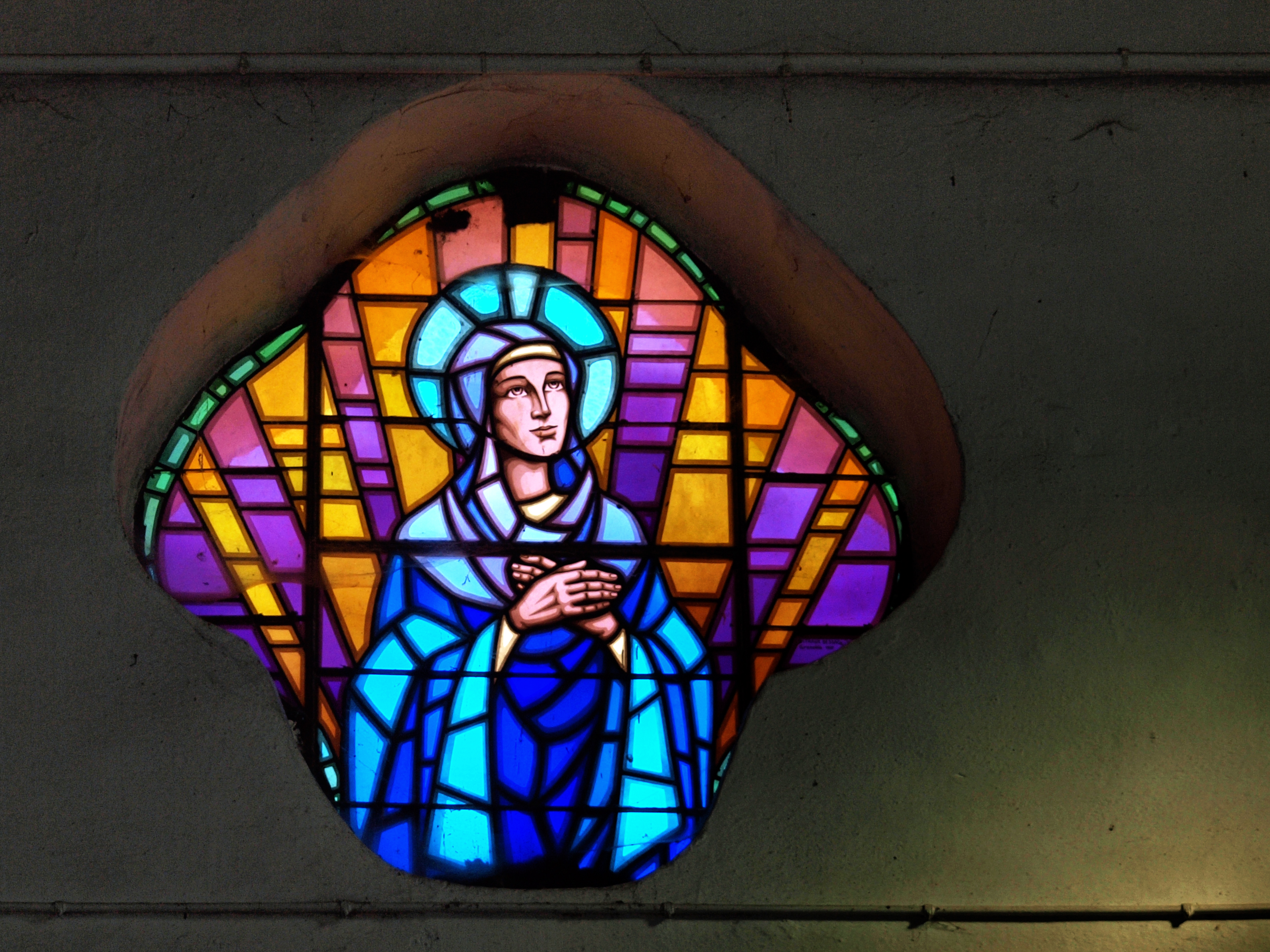
Window at the entrance to the parish church

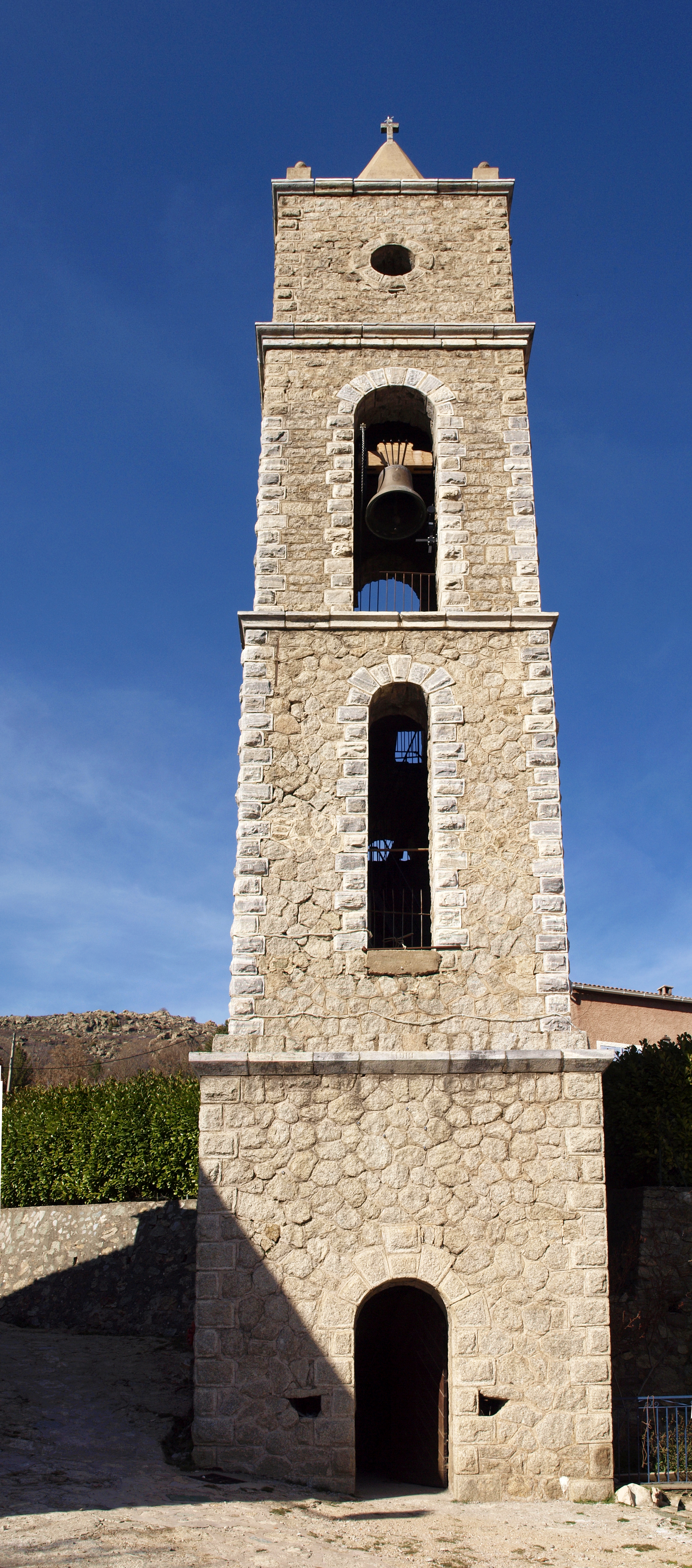
The campanile

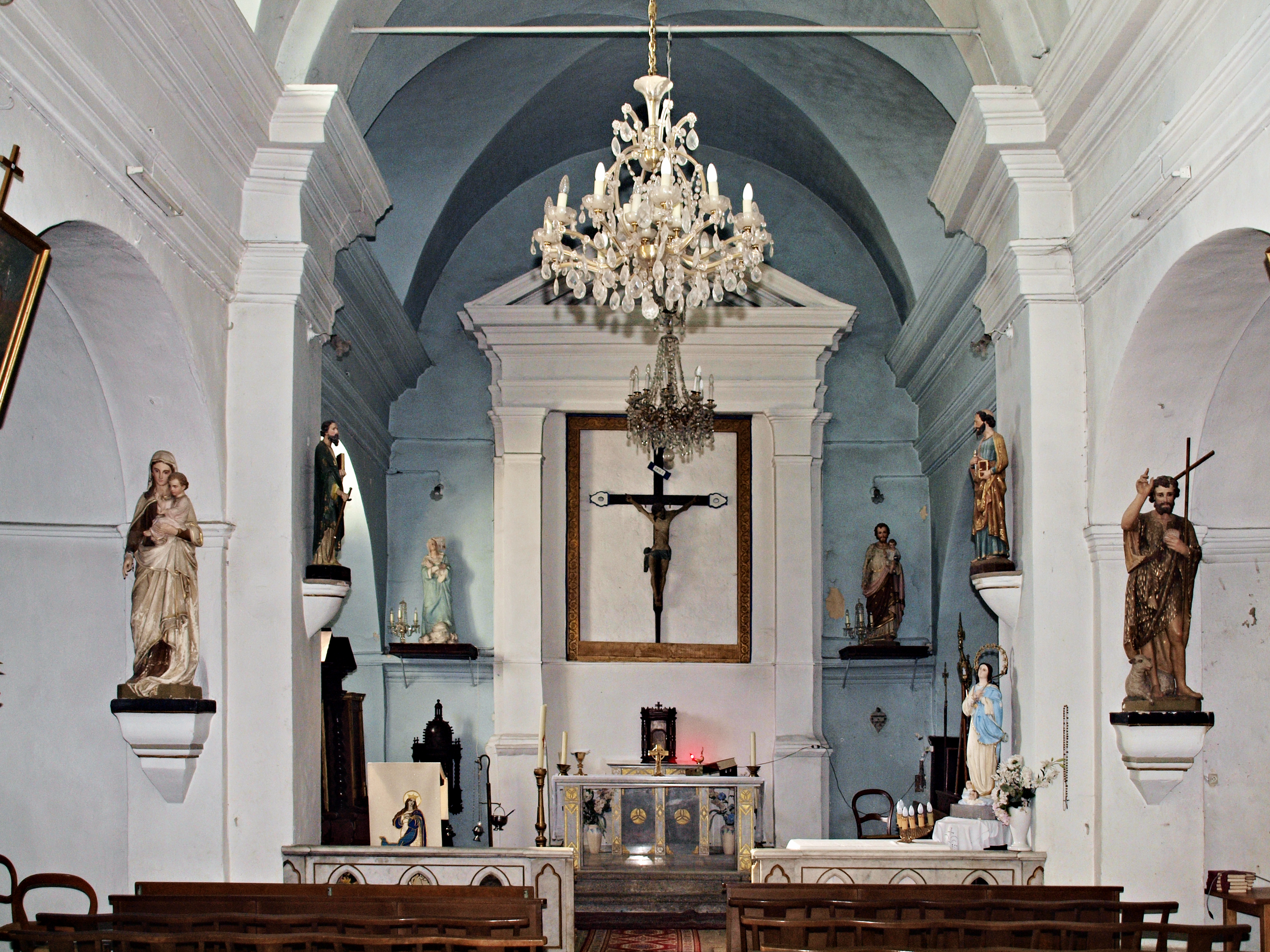
Interior of the church

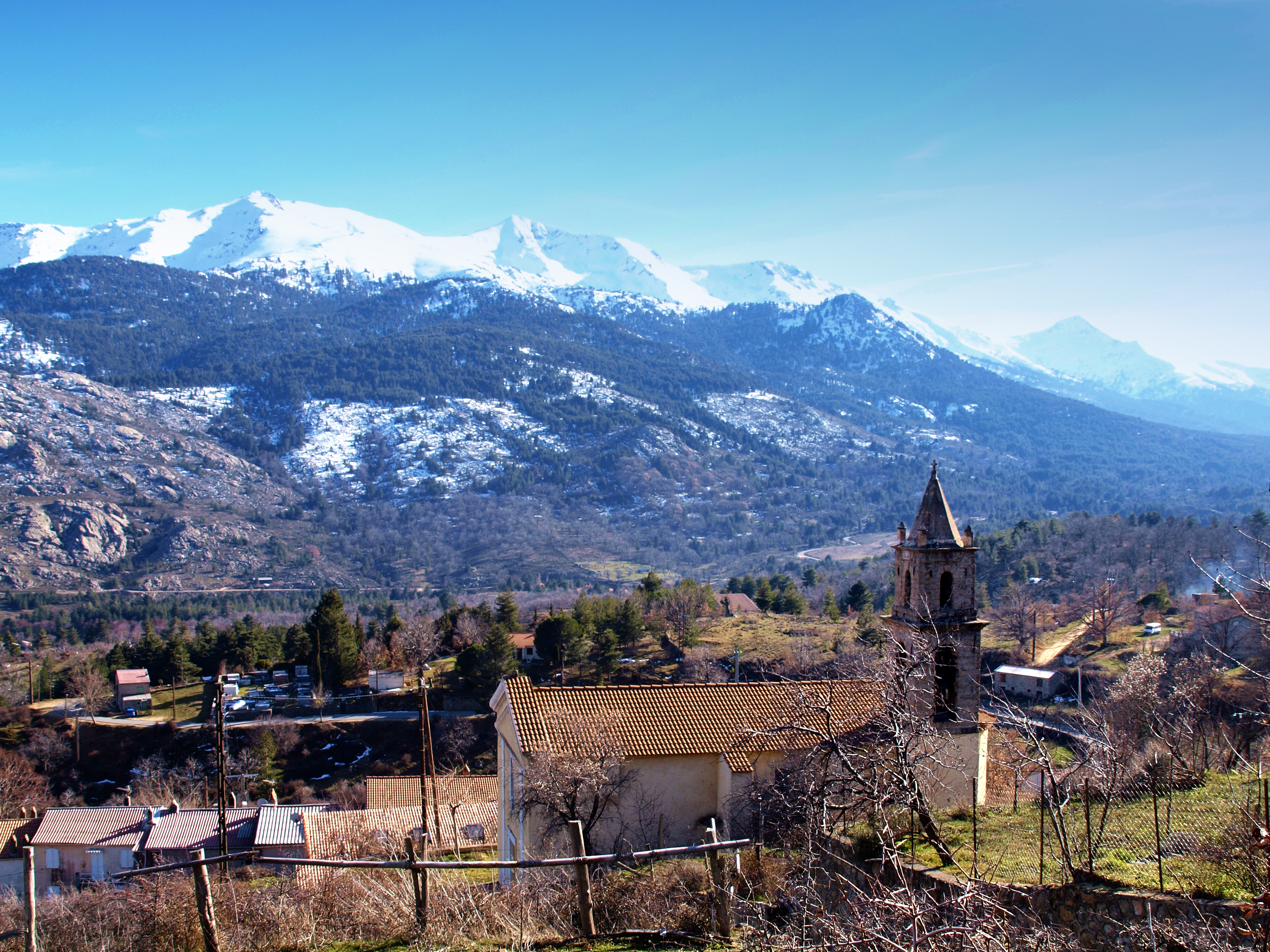
Church of Pietra-Zitamboli

== Leisure ==
=== Vergio Ski Field ===
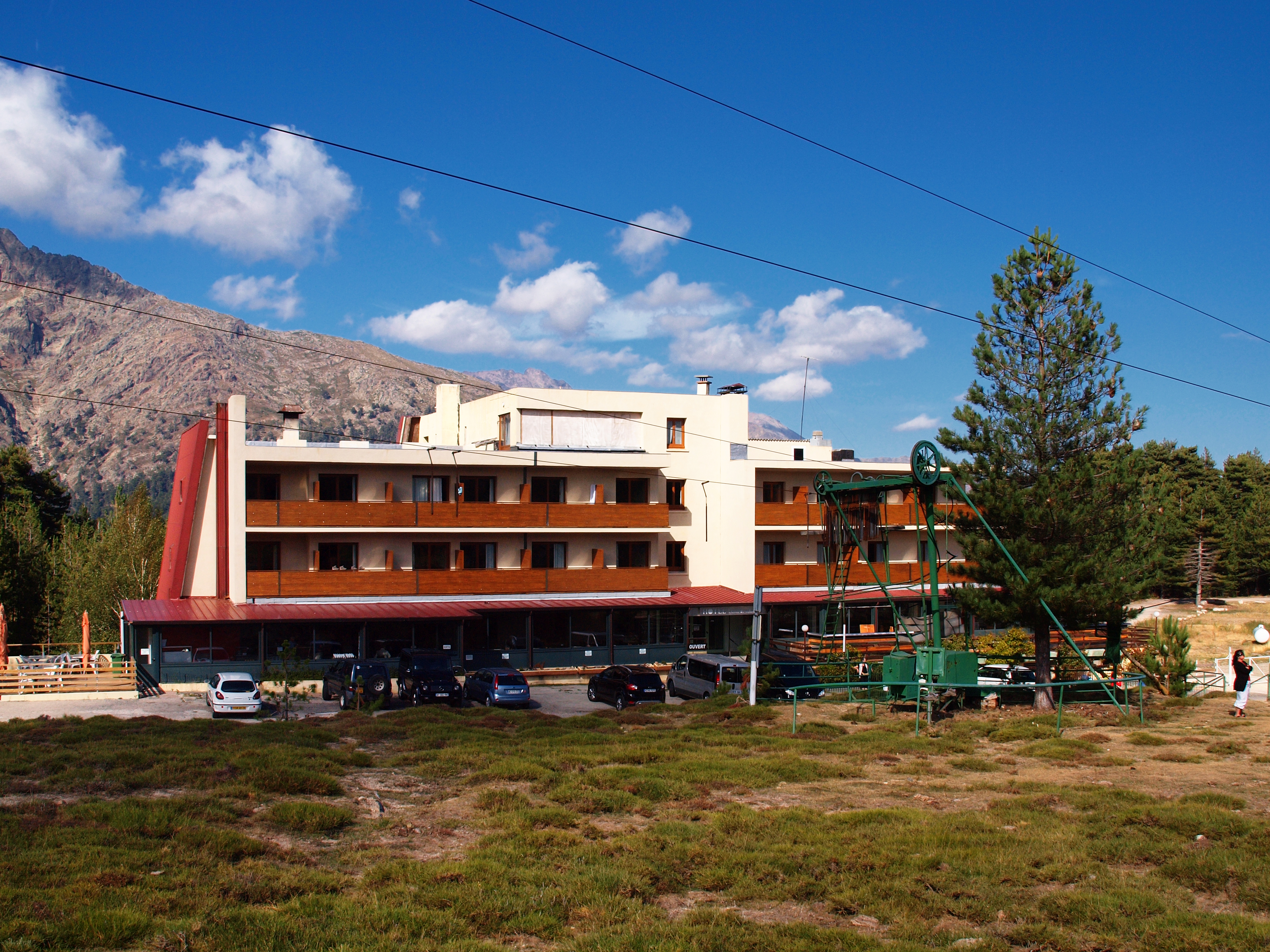
Ski station at Vergio

The ski resort of Castellu di Vergio is located about 1.5 km from the col de Vergio (1478 m) and is open year-round.

=== Hiking ===
- The GR 20 crosses the territory of the commune in its 5th and 6th stages: from Tighjettu to Ciottulu di i Mori and from Ciottulu di i Mori to Manganu.
- The GR Mare a Mare Nord traverses the commune, connecting the col de Vergio to the neighbouring villages of Calacuccia and Évisa.

=== Archaeological Museum of Niolu ===
The museum displays objects from excavations on the sites of Sidossi (Calacuccia) and A Curnatoghja at Albertacce.

=== Others ===
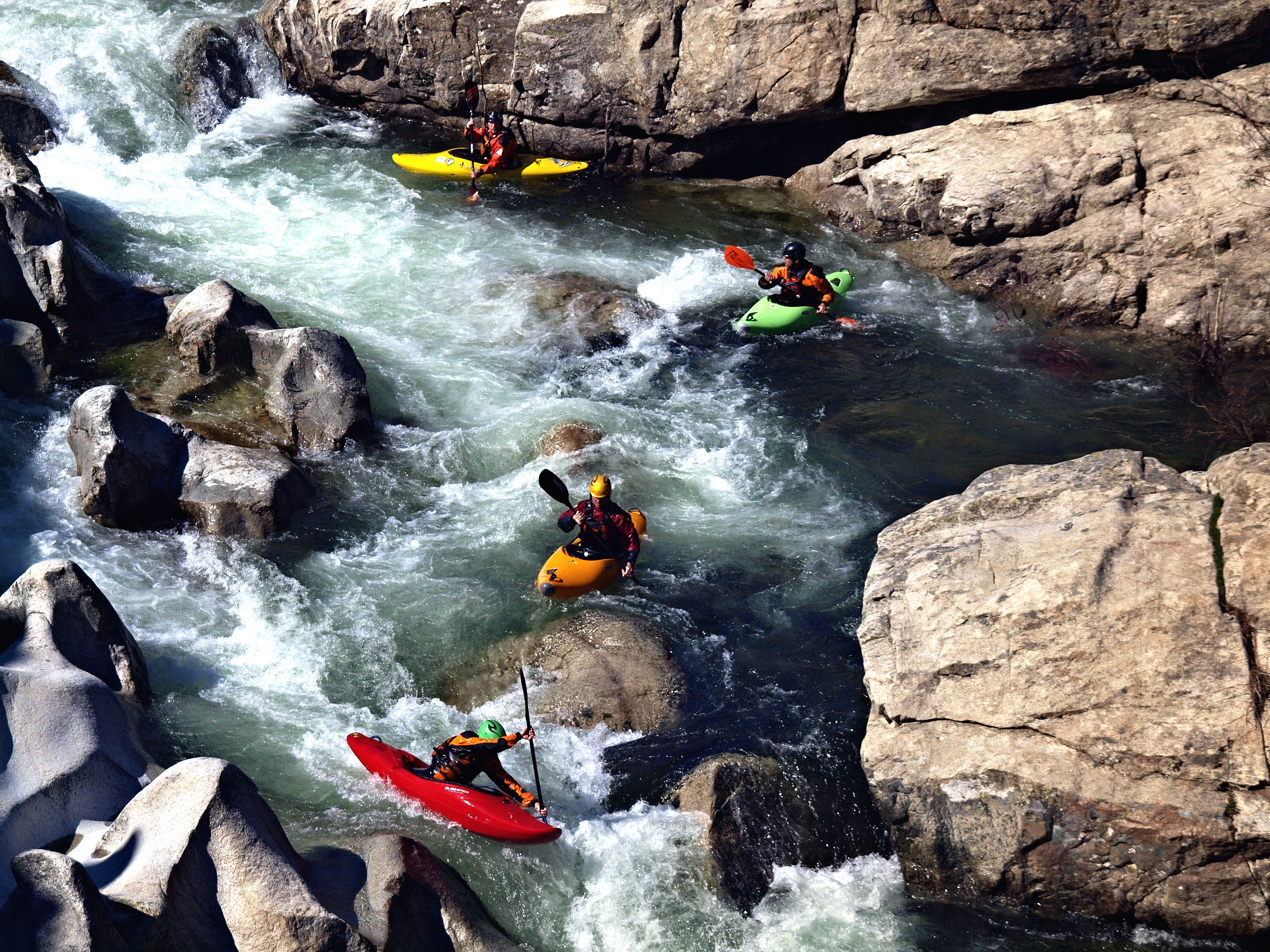
Kayaks upstream of Ponte Altu on the Golo

== See also ==
- Communes of the Haute-Corse department

=== Bibliography ===
- Corsica in antiquity and the Early Middle Ages, Xavier Poli, Paris Librairie Albert Fontemoing, 1907. (in French)
