= Punta Artica =

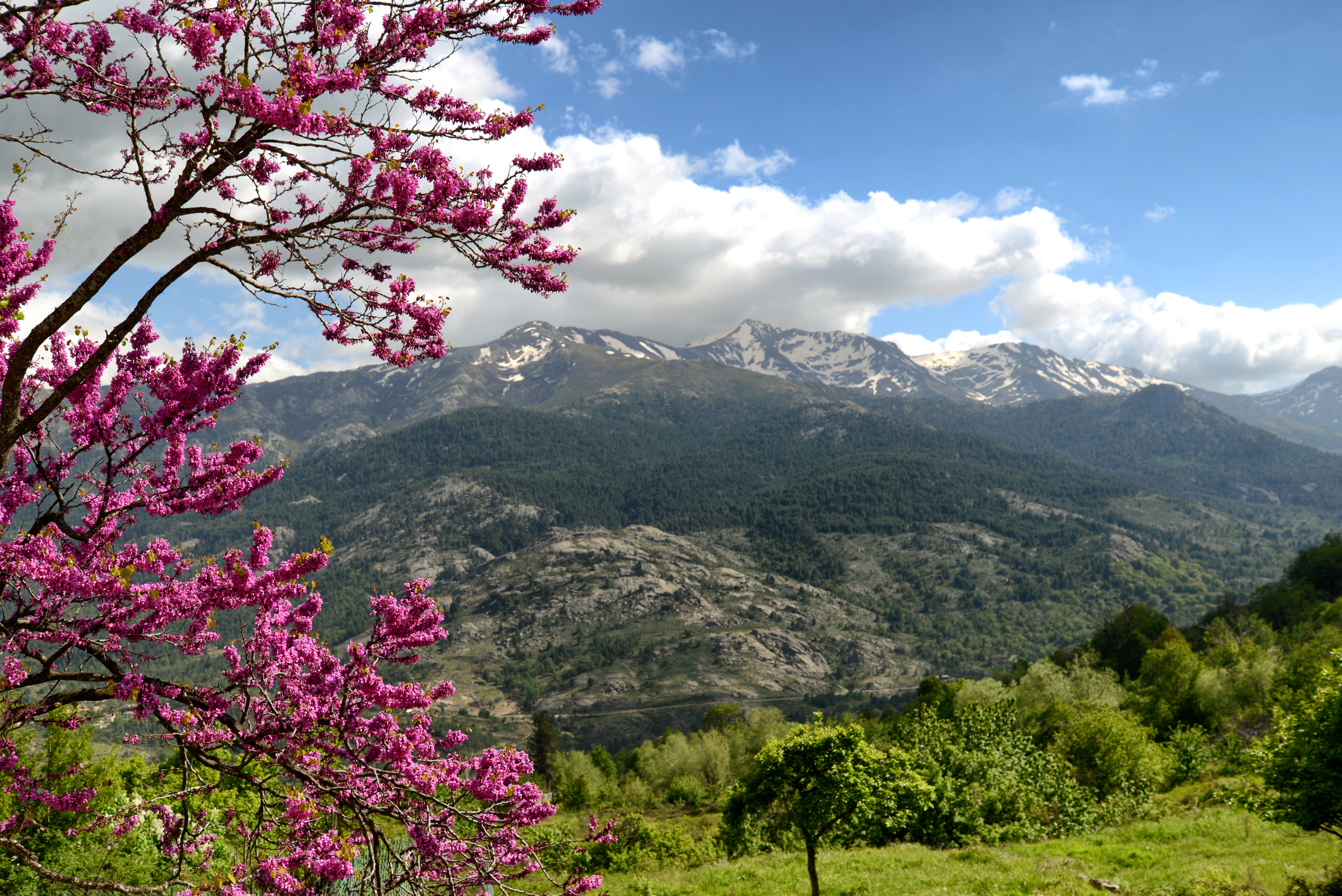
- Punta Artica from the village of Calasima

Highest point
- Elevation: 2,327 m (7,635 ft)
- Coordinates: 42°15′53″N 08°58′14″E

Geography
- Location within Corsica
- Country: France
- Department: Haute-Corse

Punta Artica or Monte Artica is a mountain in the department of Haute-Corse on the island of Corsica, France. It is in the Monte Rotondo Massif.

== Location ==
The peak of Punta Artica is in the commune of Casamaccioli just south of the border with the commune of Albertacce. It is the highest point on the ridge line that separates the Golo and Tavignano valleys.

== Physical ==
Punta Artica is 2,327 metres (7,635 ft) high. It has a clean prominence of 759 metres (2,490 ft). Its isolation is 8.02 kilometres (4.98 mi) from A Maniccia, to the southeast, which has an elevation of 2,496 metres (8,189 ft).

== Description ==
Edward Lear (1812–1888) wrote in 1870,

A few minutes' walk suffices to cross the ridge, and to bring me on the opposite side of it to the descent leading through the forest of Valdoniello, into the great basin of the Niolo, which, from the point I now stand on, is seen below in its whole breadth and length to the north-east—Niolo, the heart of Corsican romance and liberty—its long lines of hill fading away into palest blue on the horizon. All the landscape here is on a greater scale than that I have left; the lofty Monte Artica on the south, and Monte Cinto (the highest summit in the island) on the north, tower above the head of this deep and wide valley of the Golo in snowy magnificence, enclosing it as it were with gigantic wings; and less lofty heights bar away the outer world from this compactly delineated canton throughout its whole extent.

== Gallery ==
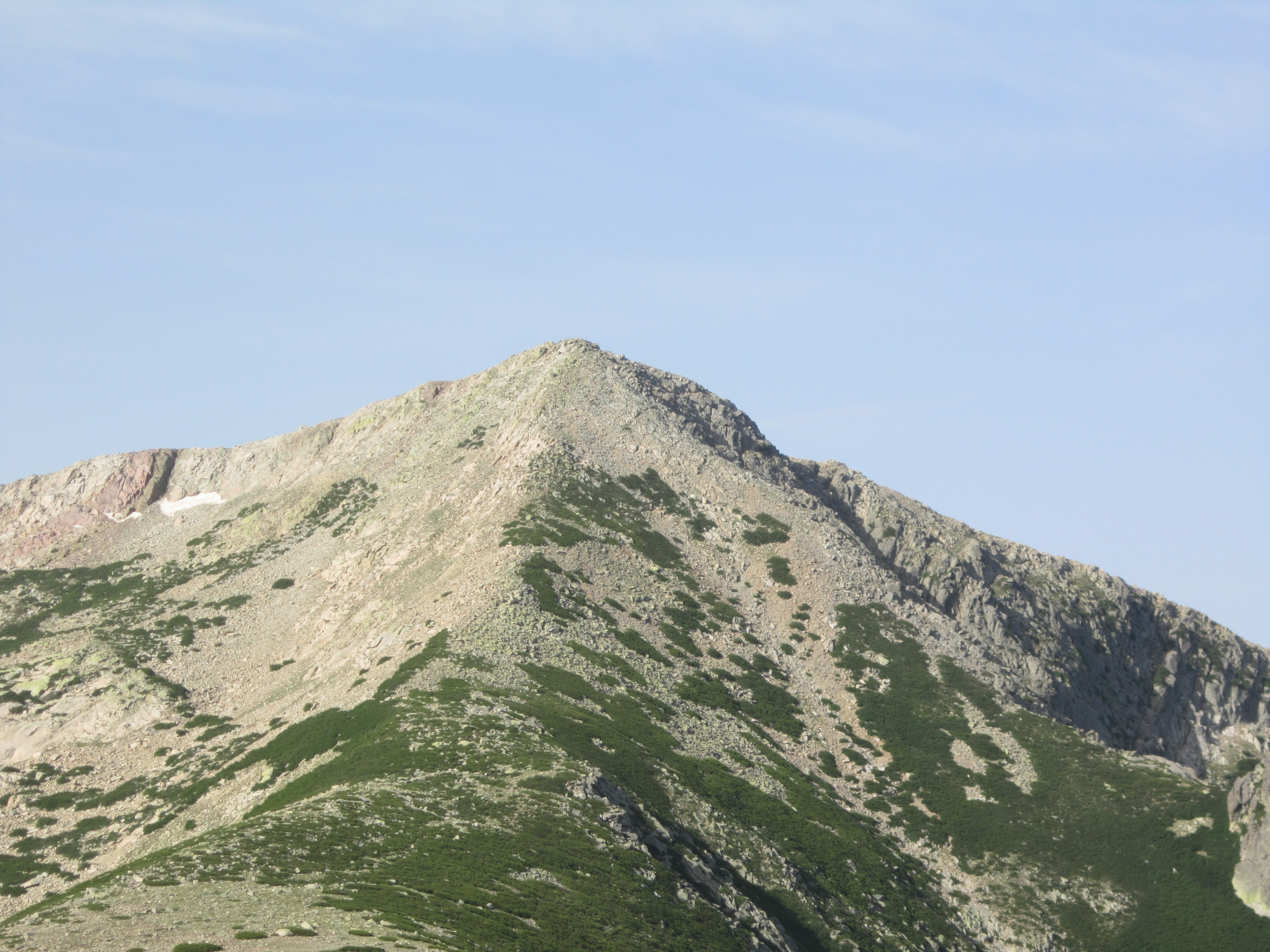
Summit from northeast (Col de Frame)

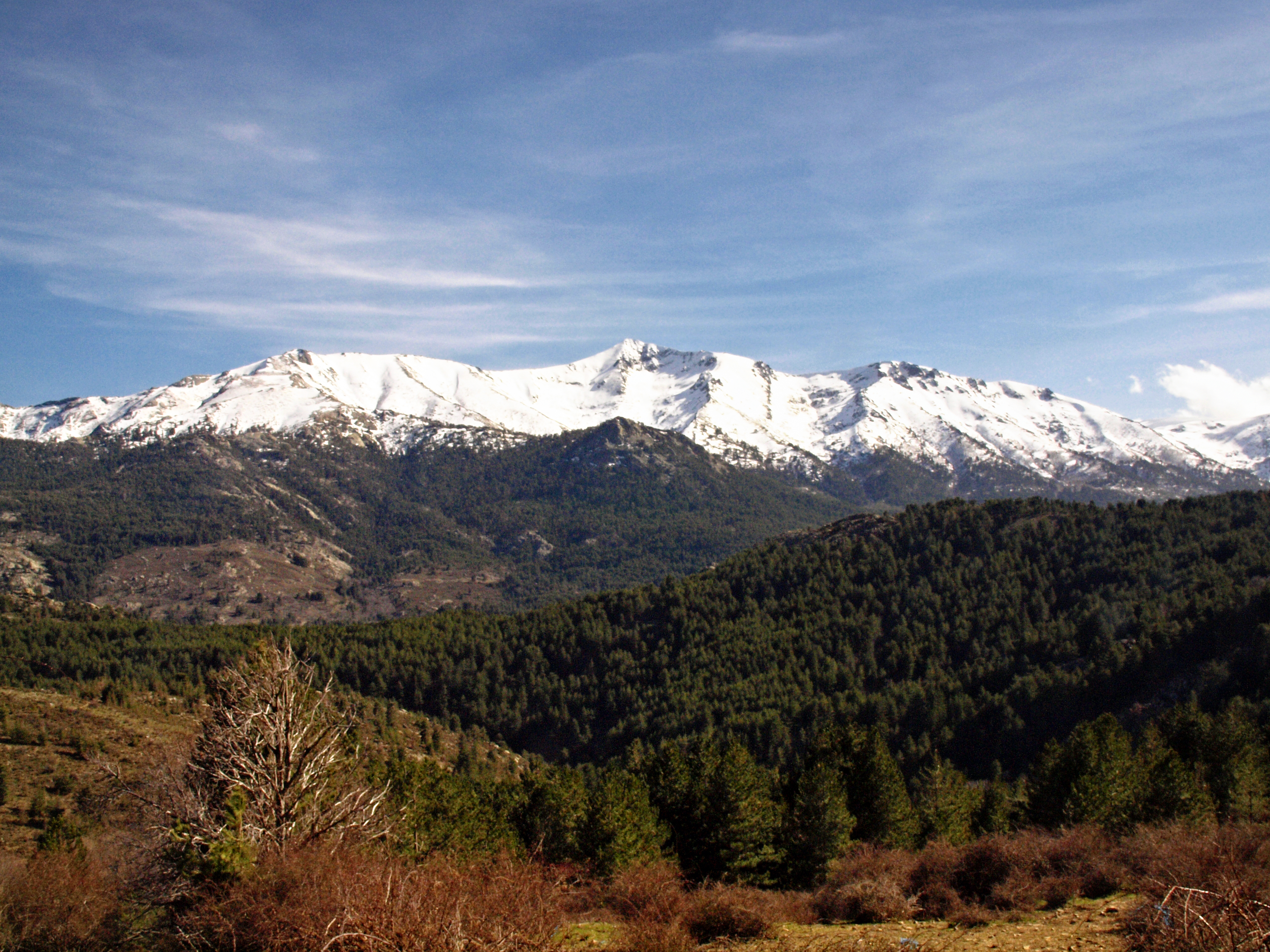
Punta Artica from Calasima

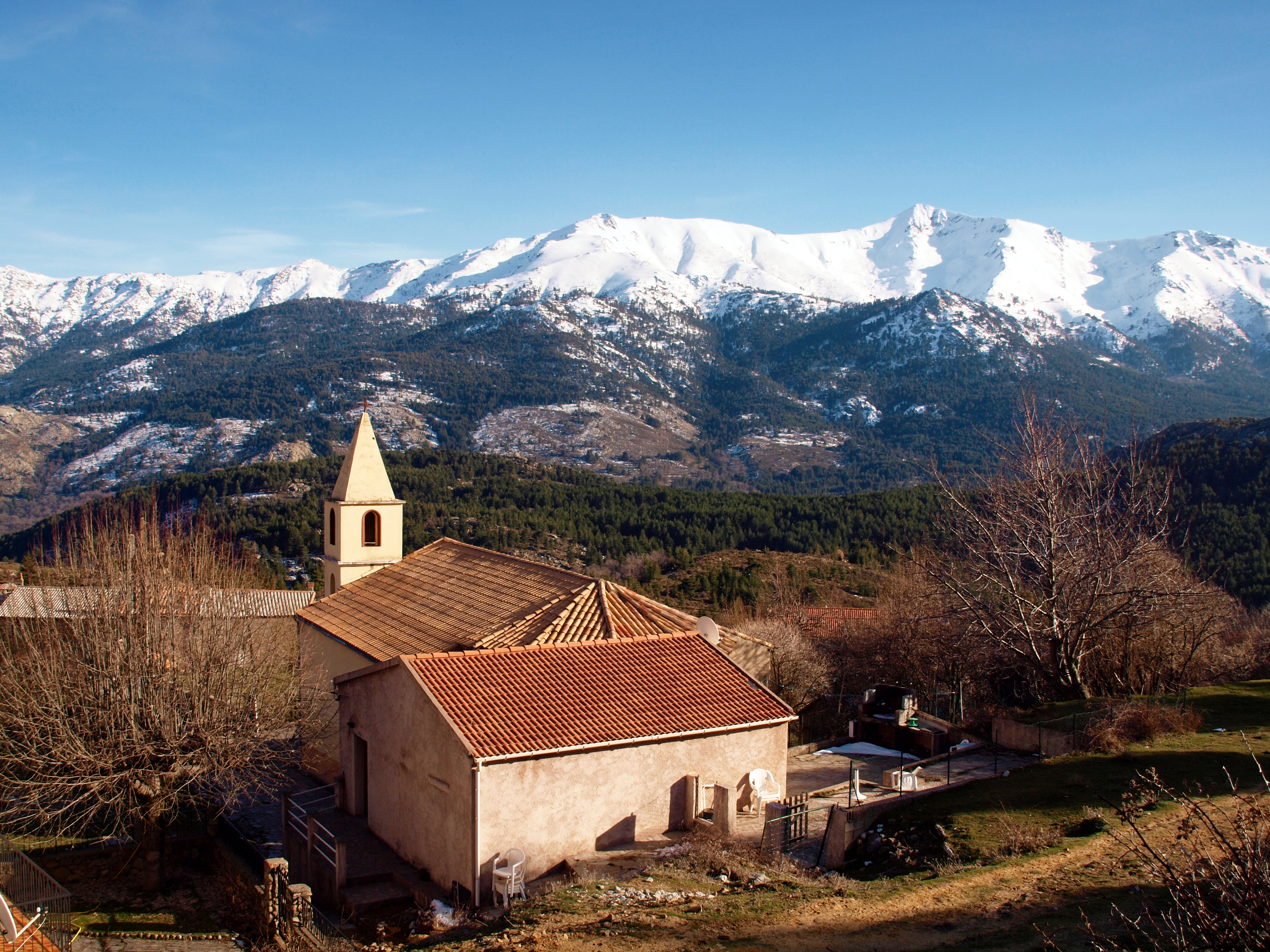
Église Saint-Nicolas, Calasima, with Punta Artica in background

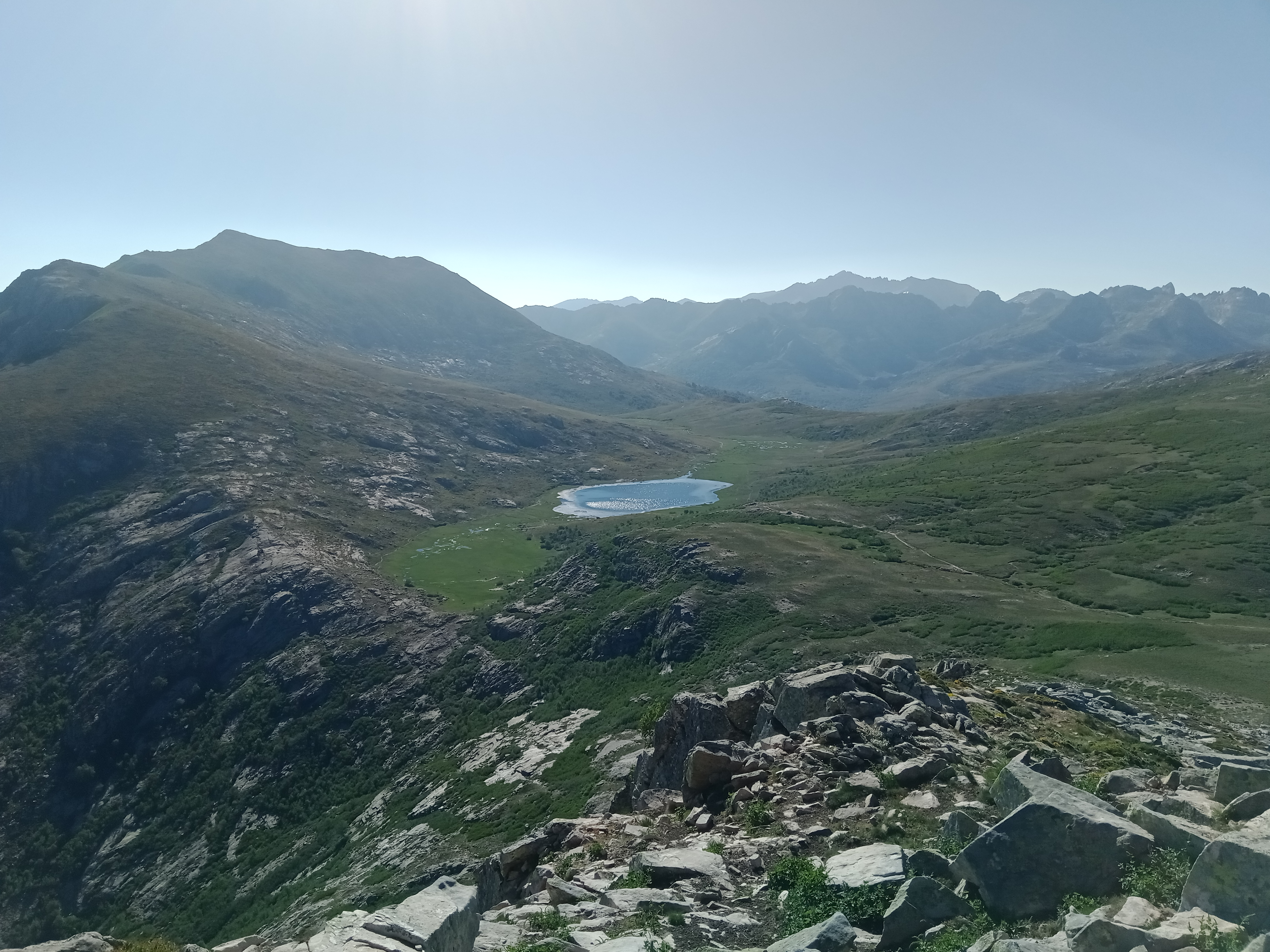
Punta Artica (left) from the west

== Sources ==
- Lear, Edward (1870), Journal of a landscape painter in Corsica, London: R. J. Bush
- Lee Newton, "Punta Artica, France", Peakbagger
- "Node: Punta Artica (26864371)", OpenStreetMap
- "Punta Artica", Paglia Orba
