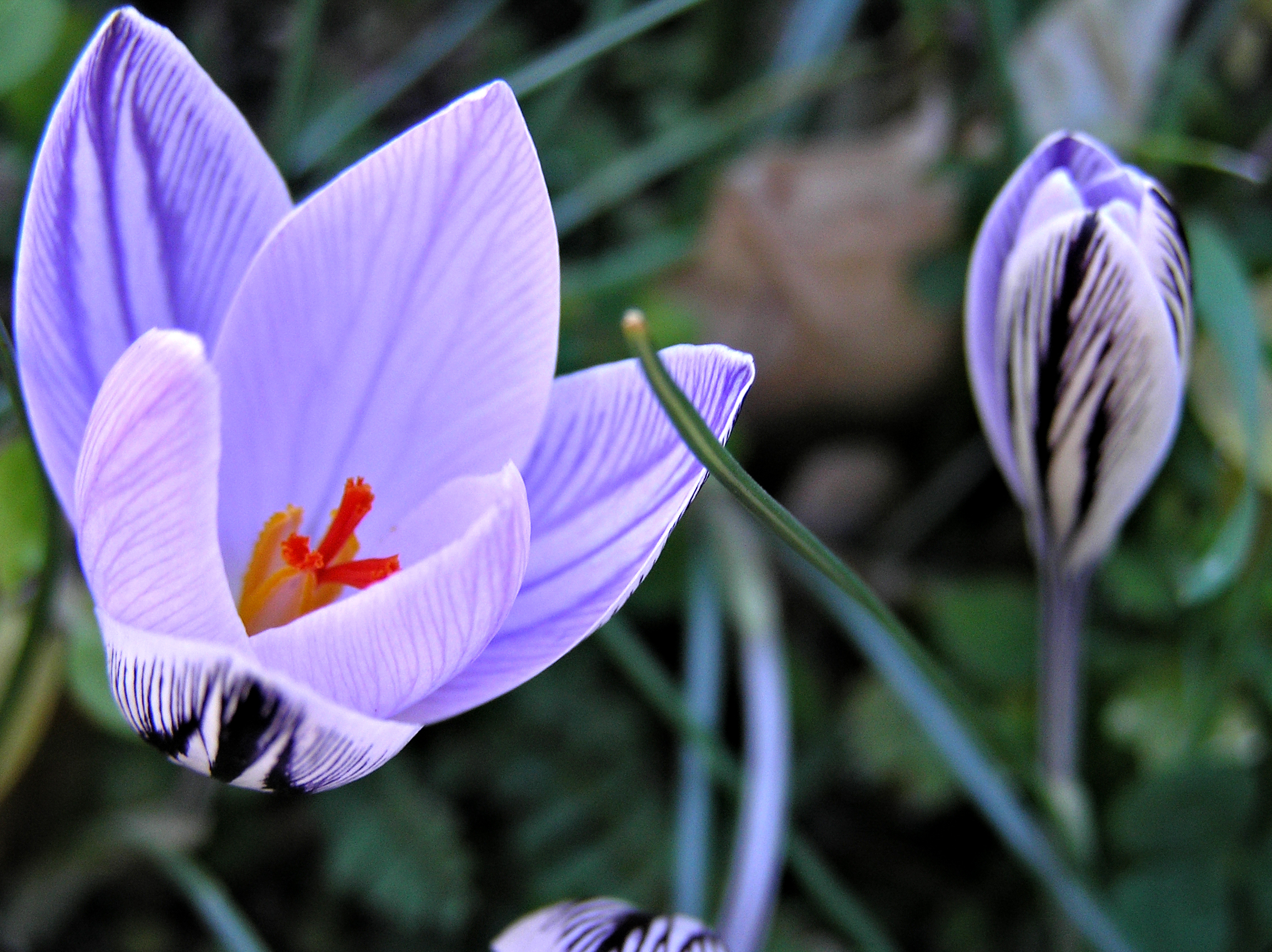

Scientific classification
- Kingdom: Plantae
- Clade: Tracheophytes
- Clade: Angiosperms
- Clade: Monocots
- Order: Asparagales
- Family: Iridaceae
- Genus: Crocus
- Species: C. corsicus

Binomial name
- Crocus corsicus Vanucchi

= Crocus corsicus =

Species of flowering plant

Crocus corsicus is a species of flowering plant in the genus Crocus of the family Iridaceae, endemic to the Mediterranean islands of Corsica and Sardinia.

== Description ==
Crocus corsicus is a cormous perennial growing to 8–10 cm (3.1–3.9 in) tall. The corm is tear-drop shaped with fine-reticulate, fibrous tunics. One or two, pale to bright reddish violet interior colored slender, fragrant, flowers are produced per blooming corm; the outer surfaces of the tepals are buff with dark purple feathering. The stigma is bright orange-red. The flowering period is from January to April. 2n = 18.

Crocus minimus also grows on Corsica and Sardinia and looks very similar, however, it can be distinguished quickly by the colour of the stigma, which in the case of C. corsicus is reddish-orange, rather than yellow.

This plant has gained the Royal Horticultural Society's Award of Garden Merit.
