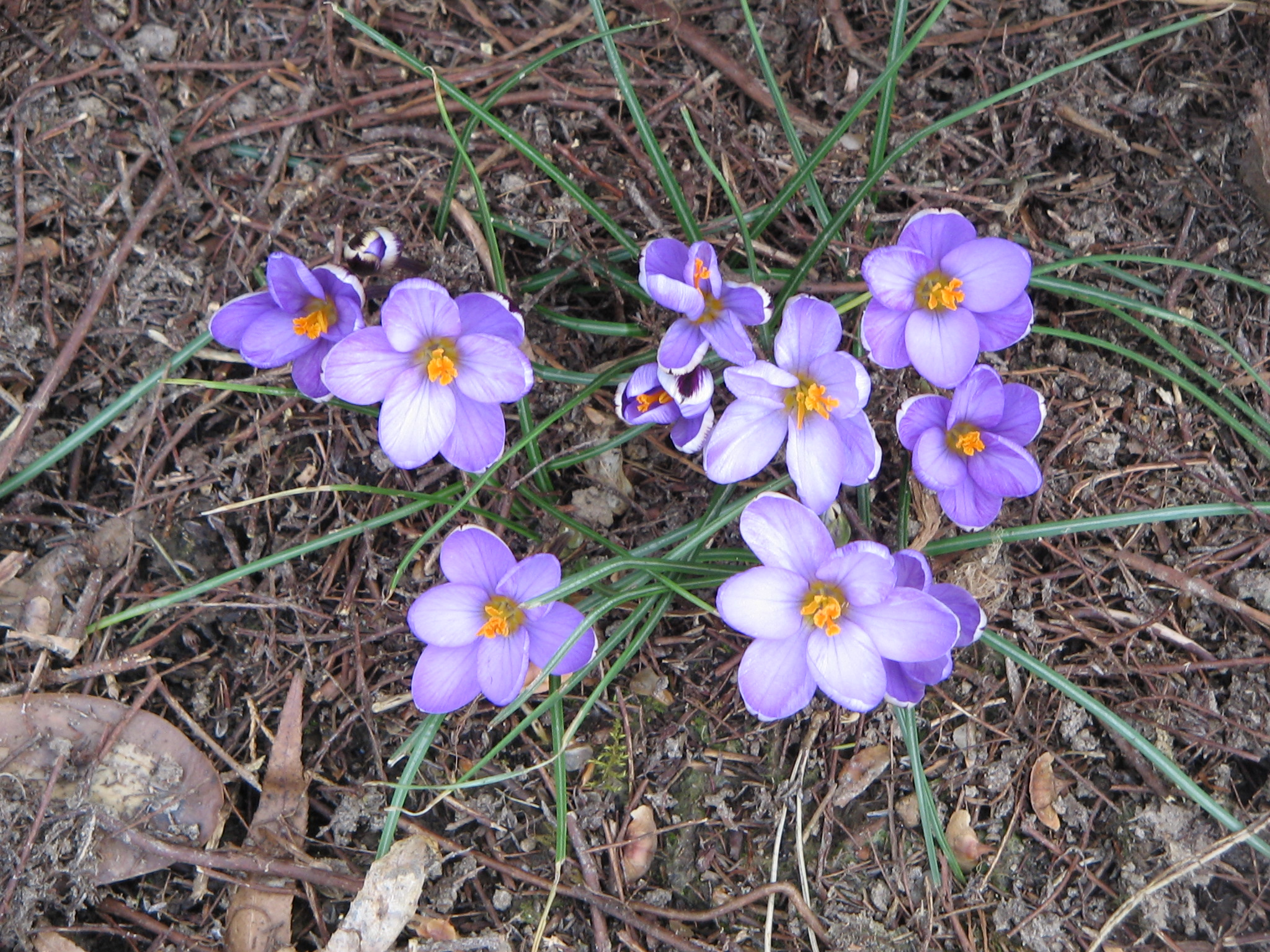

Scientific classification
- Kingdom: Plantae
- Clade: Tracheophytes
- Clade: Angiosperms
- Clade: Monocots
- Order: Asparagales
- Family: Iridaceae
- Genus: Crocus
- Species: C. minimus

Binomial name
- Crocus minimus Redouté

= Crocus minimus =

Species of flowering plant

Crocus minimus is a species of flowering plant in the genus Crocus of the family Iridaceae, found in South Corsica, Sardinia and Capraia.

Flowering occurs from January to April, and the species is found inhabiting scrub areas with low, multi-stemmed woody vegetation that is young or stunted.
