= Lozzi =

- Commune
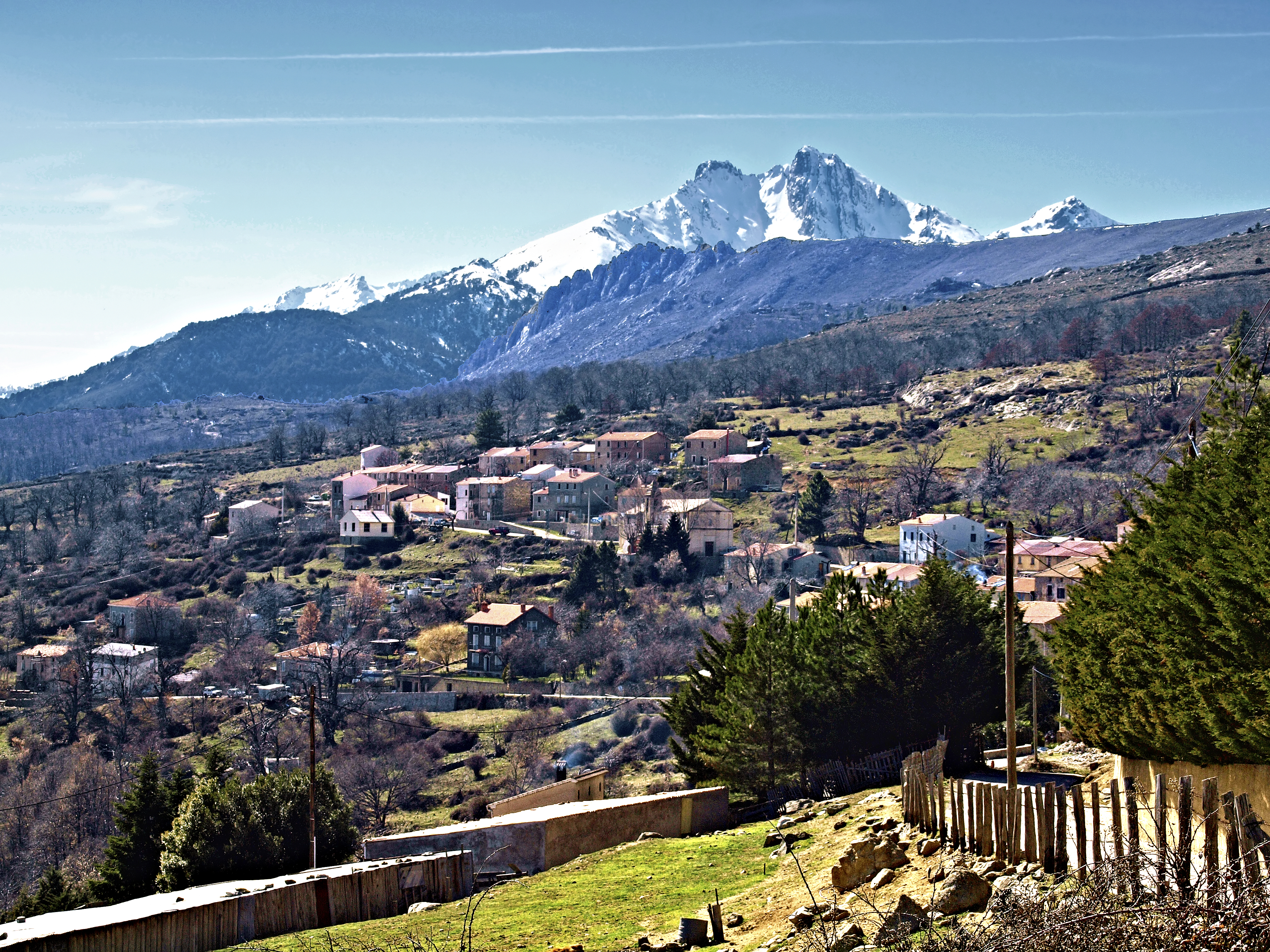
- A view of Lozzi village
- Location of Lozzi
- Location within France Location within Corsica
- Coordinates: 42°20′45″N 9°00′14″E
- Country: France
- Region: Corsica
- Department: Haute-Corse
- Arrondissement: Corte
- Canton: Golo-Morosaglia

Government
  - Mayor (2020–2026): François Acquaviva
- Area^{1}: 30.79 km^{2} (11.89 sq mi)
- Elevation: 1,044 m (3,425 ft)
- Highest elevation: 2,706 m (8,878 ft)
- Lowest elevation: 817 m (2,680 ft)
- Population (2023): 110
  - Density: 3.6/km^{2} (9.3/sq mi)
- Time zone: UTC+01:00 (CET)
  - Summer (DST): UTC+02:00 (CEST)
- INSEE/Postal code: 2B147 /20224
- ^{1} French Land Register data, which excludes lakes, ponds, glaciers > 1 km^{2} (0.386 sq mi or 247 acres) and river estuaries.

Lozzi is a commune in the Haute-Corse department of France on the island of Corsica.

== Population ==
Historical population
Year	Pop.	±% p.a.
1968	348	—
1975	247	−4.78%
1982	230	−1.01%
1990	136	−6.36%
1999	132	−0.33%
2007	130	−0.19%
2012	122	−1.26%
2017	118	−0.66%
2023	110	−1.16%
Source: INSEE

== See also ==
- Communes of the Haute-Corse department
