= Calacuccia =

- Commune
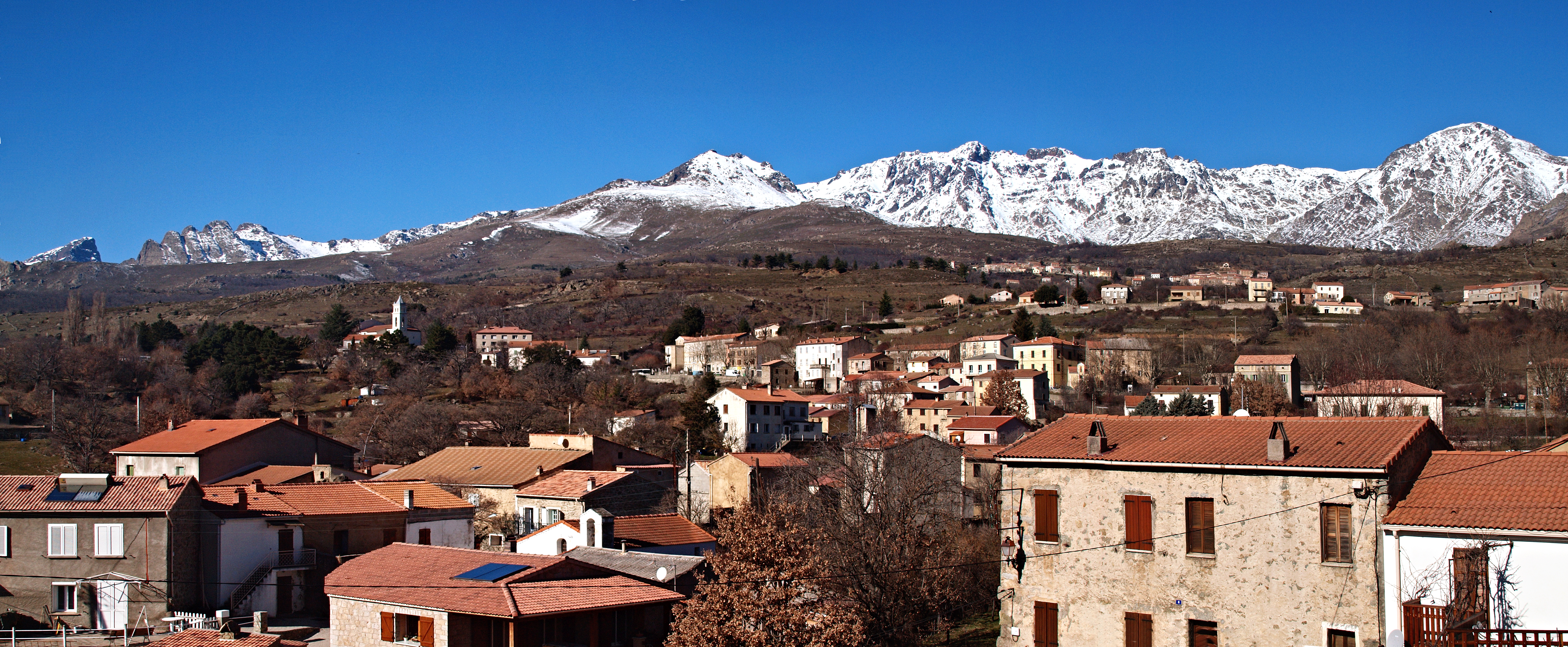
- A panorama of Calacuccia
- Location of Calacuccia
- Location within France Location within Corsica
- Coordinates: 42°20′12″N 9°01′05″E
- Country: France
- Region: Corsica
- Department: Haute-Corse
- Arrondissement: Corte
- Canton: Golo-Morosaglia

Government
  - Mayor (2021–2026): Mathieu Acquaviva
- Area^{1}: 18.77 km^{2} (7.25 sq mi)
- Elevation: 847 m (2,779 ft)
- Highest elevation: 1,760 m (5,770 ft)
- Lowest elevation: 705 m (2,313 ft)
- Population (2023): 272
  - Density: 14.5/km^{2} (37.5/sq mi)
- Time zone: UTC+01:00 (CET)
  - Summer (DST): UTC+02:00 (CEST)
- INSEE/Postal code: 2B047 /20224
- ^{1} French Land Register data, which excludes lakes, ponds, glaciers > 1 km^{2} (0.386 sq mi or 247 acres) and river estuaries.

Calacuccia (French pronunciation: [kalakutʃ(j)a]) is a commune in the Haute-Corse department of France on the island of Corsica. It contains the Lac de Calacuccia, a hydroelectric reservoir, just south of the village of Calacuccia.

== Geography ==
=== Climate ===
Calacuccia has a warm-summer mediterranean climate (Köppen climate classification Csb). The average annual temperature in Calacuccia is 11.5 °C (52.7 °F). The average annual rainfall is 891.5 mm (35.10 in) with November as the wettest month. The temperatures are highest on average in July, at around 21.3 °C (70.3 °F), and lowest in January, at around 3.6 °C (38.5 °F). The highest temperature ever recorded in Calacuccia was 40.0 °C (104.0 °F) on 23 July 1983; the coldest temperature ever recorded was −14.6 °C (5.7 °F) on 11 February 2012.

Climate data for Calacuccia (1981–2010 averages, extremes 1950−2016)
Month	Jan	Feb	Mar	Apr	May	Jun	Jul	Aug	Sep	Oct	Nov	Dec	Year
Record high °C (°F)	21.4 (70.5)	19.8 (67.6)	27.0 (80.6)	28.0 (82.4)	32.9 (91.2)	36.4 (97.5)	40.0 (104.0)	37.5 (99.5)	35.0 (95.0)	30.0 (86.0)	23.2 (73.8)	19.0 (66.2)	40.0 (104.0)
Mean daily maximum °C (°F)	8.5 (47.3)	9.2 (48.6)	12.3 (54.1)	14.6 (58.3)	19.9 (67.8)	24.7 (76.5)	28.8 (83.8)	28.2 (82.8)	23.0 (73.4)	18.3 (64.9)	12.4 (54.3)	9.1 (48.4)	17.5 (63.5)
Daily mean °C (°F)	3.6 (38.5)	3.9 (39.0)	6.7 (44.1)	9.0 (48.2)	13.6 (56.5)	17.9 (64.2)	21.3 (70.3)	20.6 (69.1)	16.1 (61.0)	12.3 (54.1)	7.4 (45.3)	4.7 (40.5)	11.5 (52.7)
Mean daily minimum °C (°F)	−1.3 (29.7)	−1.4 (29.5)	1.1 (34.0)	3.3 (37.9)	7.2 (45.0)	11.0 (51.8)	13.8 (56.8)	13.0 (55.4)	9.3 (48.7)	6.4 (43.5)	2.5 (36.5)	0.2 (32.4)	5.5 (41.9)
Record low °C (°F)	−12.0 (10.4)	−14.6 (5.7)	−13.4 (7.9)	−7.0 (19.4)	−3.5 (25.7)	1.1 (34.0)	1.0 (33.8)	2.0 (35.6)	−2.0 (28.4)	−3.2 (26.2)	−8.2 (17.2)	−10.5 (13.1)	−14.6 (5.7)
Average precipitation mm (inches)	77.9 (3.07)	73.9 (2.91)	70.7 (2.78)	87.9 (3.46)	61.0 (2.40)	35.4 (1.39)	15.6 (0.61)	29.9 (1.18)	62.0 (2.44)	118.4 (4.66)	129.8 (5.11)	129.0 (5.08)	891.5 (35.10)
Average precipitation days (≥ 1.0 mm)	8.1	8.1	8.1	10.0	6.5	4.0	2.2	3.9	6.1	8.5	10.4	10.2	86.0
Source: Meteociel

== Population ==
Historical population
Year	Pop.	±% p.a.
1968	556	—
1975	507	−1.31%
1982	418	−2.72%
1990	331	−2.87%
1999	340	+0.30%
2007	333	−0.26%
2012	296	−2.33%
2017	280	−1.11%
2023	272	−0.48%
Source: INSEE

== See also ==
- Communes of the Haute-Corse department
