= Casamaccioli =

- Commune
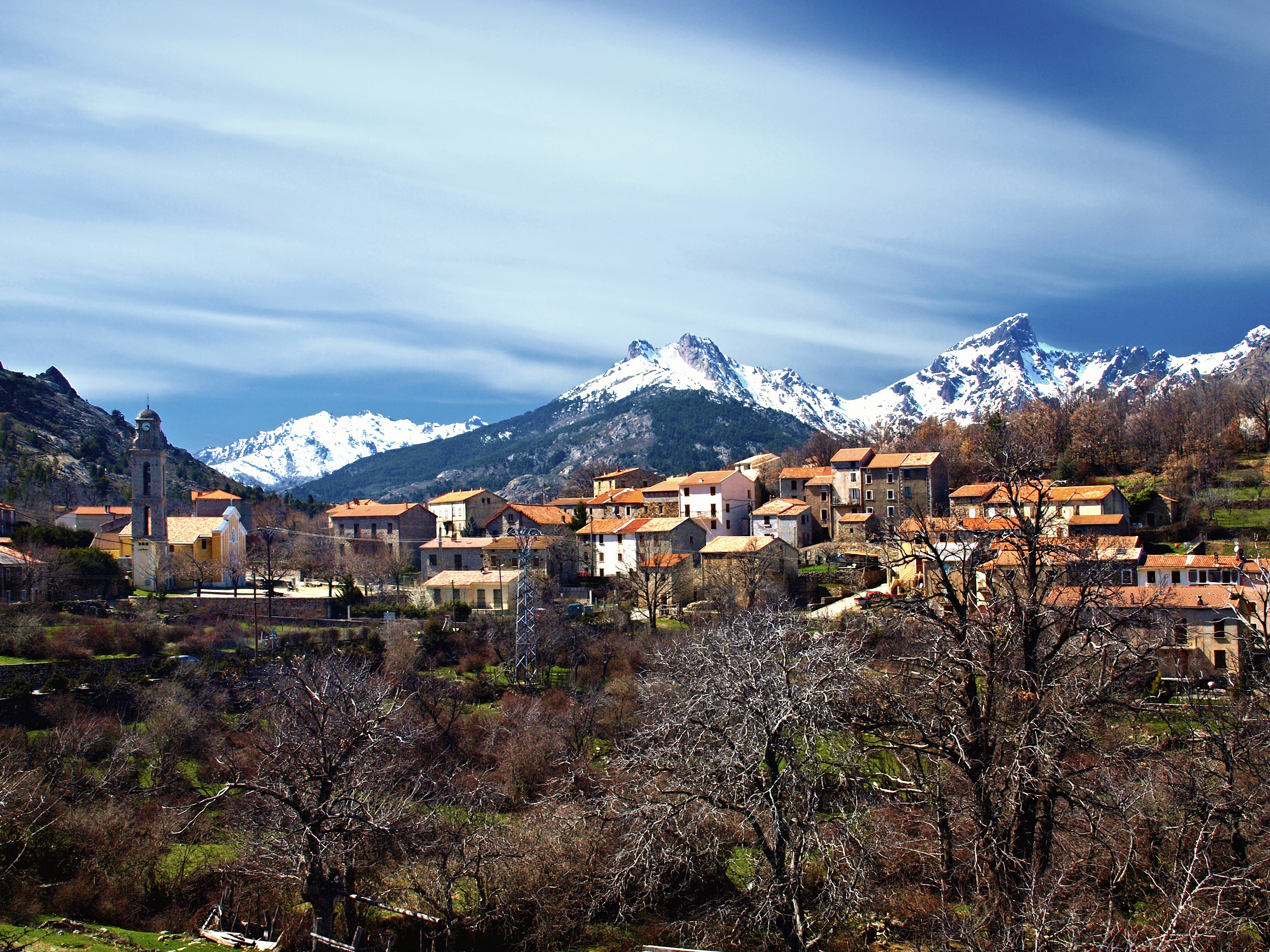
- A view of the village and the Paglia Orba
- Location of Casamaccioli
- Location within France Location within Corsica
- Coordinates: 42°19′06″N 9°00′07″E
- Country: France
- Region: Corsica
- Department: Haute-Corse
- Arrondissement: Corte
- Canton: Golo-Morosaglia

Government
  - Mayor (2020–2026): Pierre-Marie Geronimi
- Area^{1}: 36.17 km^{2} (13.97 sq mi)
- Elevation: 868 m (2,848 ft)
- Highest elevation: 2,320 m (7,610 ft)
- Lowest elevation: 785 m (2,575 ft)
- Population (2023): 115
  - Density: 3.18/km^{2} (8.23/sq mi)
- Time zone: UTC+01:00 (CET)
  - Summer (DST): UTC+02:00 (CEST)
- INSEE/Postal code: 2B073 /20224
- ^{1} French Land Register data, which excludes lakes, ponds, glaciers > 1 km^{2} (0.386 sq mi or 247 acres) and river estuaries.

Casamaccioli is a commune in the Haute-Corse department of France on the island of Corsica.

== Population ==
Historical population
Year	Pop.	±% p.a.
1968	285	—
1975	172	−6.96%
1982	140	−2.90%
1990	91	−5.24%
1999	100	+1.05%
2007	98	−0.25%
2012	98	+0.00%
2017	106	+1.58%
2023	115	+1.37%
Source: INSEE

== See also ==
- Communes of the Haute-Corse department
