= Campu di Bonu =

Archaeological site in Corsica, France

Campu di Bonu is an archaeological site in Corsica. It is located in the commune of Bisinchi.

It consists in two graves from the 3rd millennium BC.
