= Bisinchi =

- Commune
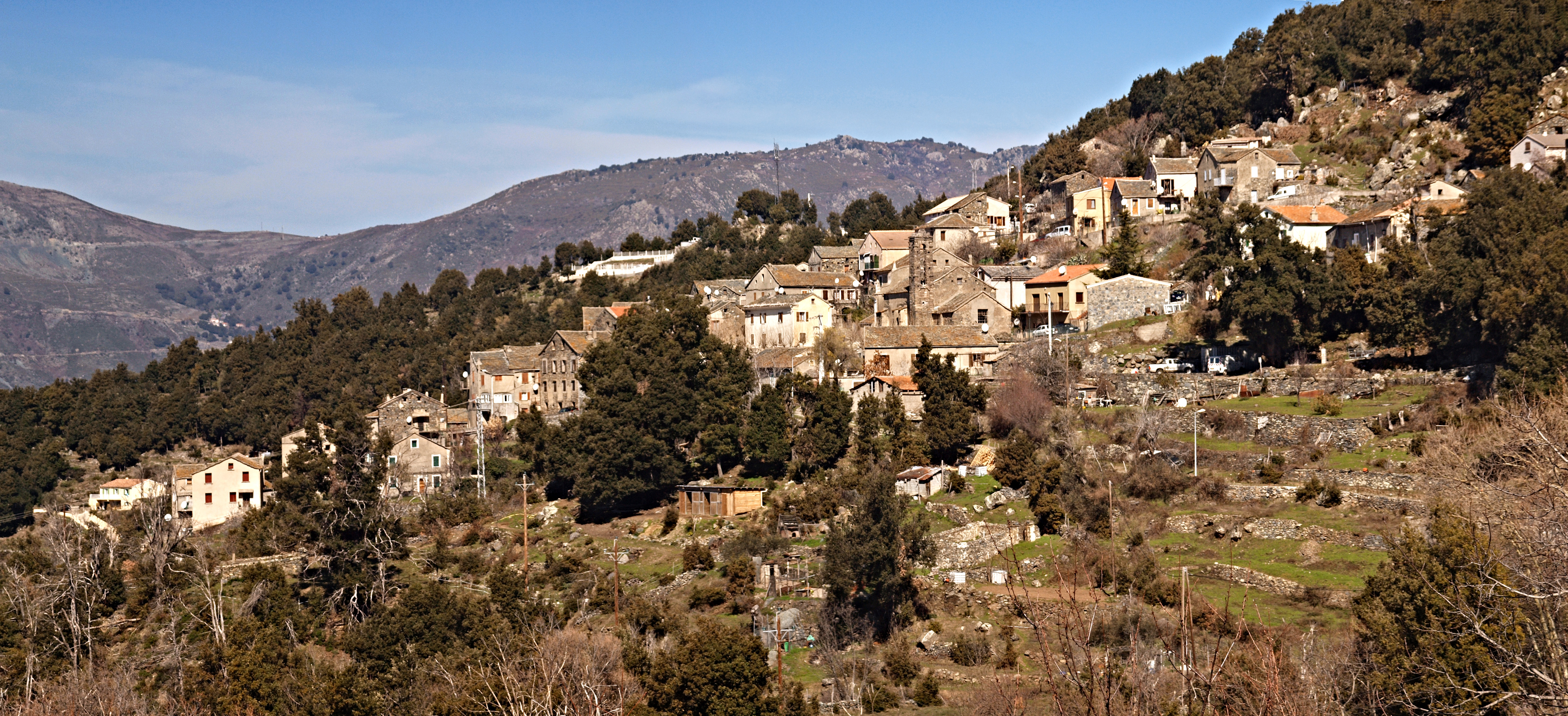
- A panorama of Bisinchi village
- Location of Bisinchi
- Location within France Location within Corsica
- Coordinates: 42°28′45″N 9°19′27″E
- Country: France
- Region: Corsica
- Department: Haute-Corse
- Arrondissement: Corte
- Canton: Golo-Morosaglia

Government
  - Mayor (2020–2026): Pierre-Felix Olmeta
- Area^{1}: 12.66 km^{2} (4.89 sq mi)
- Elevation: 500 m (1,600 ft)
- Highest elevation: 1,067 m (3,501 ft)
- Lowest elevation: 113 m (371 ft)
- Population (2023): 183
  - Density: 14.5/km^{2} (37.4/sq mi)
- Time zone: UTC+01:00 (CET)
  - Summer (DST): UTC+02:00 (CEST)
- INSEE/Postal code: 2B039 /20235
- ^{1} French Land Register data, which excludes lakes, ponds, glaciers > 1 km^{2} (0.386 sq mi or 247 acres) and river estuaries.

Bisinchi (French pronunciation: [bizinki]) is a commune in the Haute-Corse department of France on the island of Corsica.

== Population ==
Historical population
Year	Pop.	±% p.a.
1968	278	—
1975	212	−3.80%
1982	205	−0.48%
1990	139	−4.74%
1999	173	+2.46%
2007	198	+1.70%
2012	180	−1.89%
2017	220	+4.10%
2023	183	−3.02%
Source: INSEE

== Sights ==
- Campu di Bonu: an archeological site on the northwestern slope of the Monte Castellare.

== See also ==
- Communes of the Haute-Corse department
