= Piobetta =

- Commune
- Location of Piobetta
- Location within France Location within Corsica
- Coordinates: 42°20′43″N 9°23′02″E
- Country: France
- Region: Corsica
- Department: Haute-Corse
- Arrondissement: Corte
- Canton: Castagniccia

Government
  - Mayor (2020–2026): Pierre Lorenzi
- Area^{1}: 4.81 km^{2} (1.86 sq mi)
- Elevation: 800 m (2,600 ft)
- Highest elevation: 1,727 m (5,666 ft)
- Lowest elevation: 559 m (1,834 ft)
- Population (2023): 20
  - Density: 4.2/km^{2} (11/sq mi)
- Time zone: UTC+01:00 (CET)
  - Summer (DST): UTC+02:00 (CEST)
- INSEE/Postal code: 2B234 /20234
- ^{1} French Land Register data, which excludes lakes, ponds, glaciers > 1 km^{2} (0.386 sq mi or 247 acres) and river estuaries.

Piobetta (French pronunciation: [pjɔbɛta]; Corsican: Piubbeta) is a commune in the Haute-Corse department of France on the island of Corsica.

== Population ==
Historical population
| Year | Pop. | ±% p.a. |
|---|---|---|
| 1968 | 70 | — |
| 1975 | 60 | −2.18% |
| 1982 | 56 | −0.98% |
| 1990 | 40 | −4.12% |
| 1999 | 30 | −3.15% |
| 2007 | 25 | −2.25% |
| 2012 | 22 | −2.52% |
| 2017 | 20 | −1.89% |
| 2023 | 20 | +0.00% |
Source: INSEE

== See also ==
- Communes of the Haute-Corse department
