= Étang de Palo =

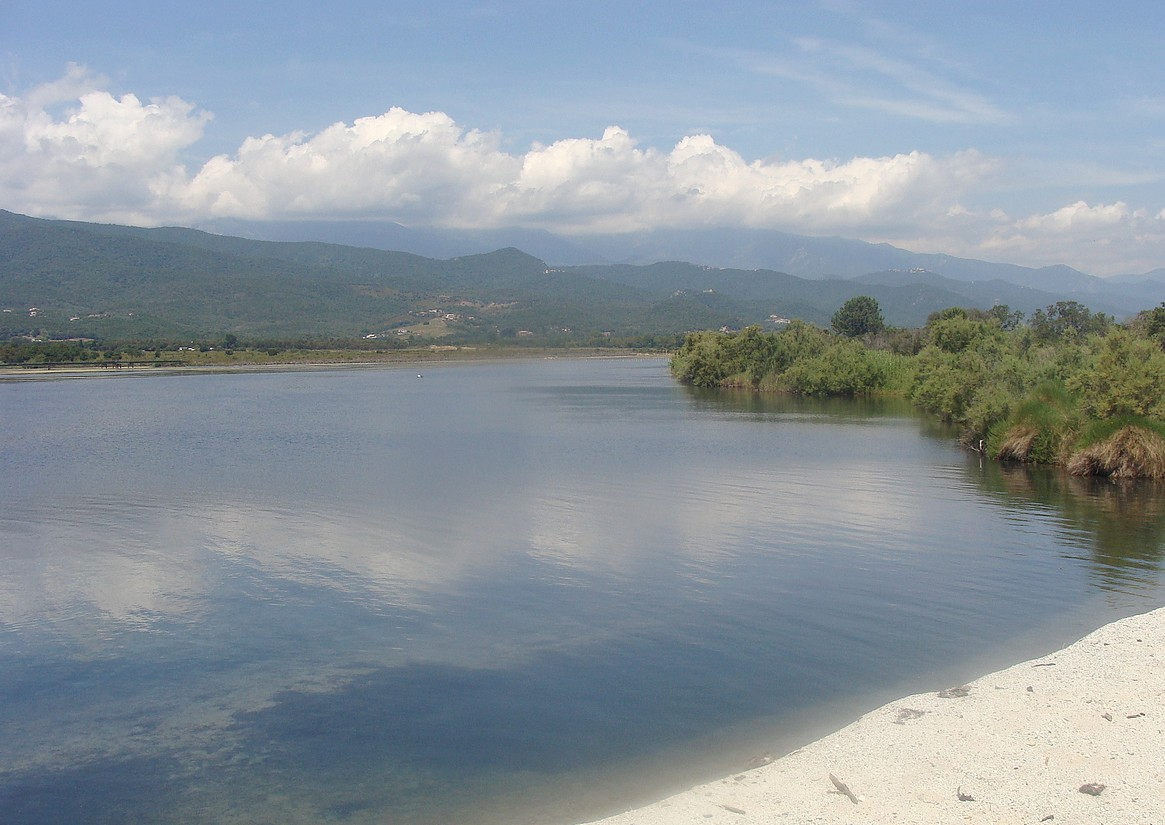
- Étang de Palo seen from the southern point of the coastal dunes.

- Location within Corsica Location within France
- Coordinates: 41.9466°N 9.4064°E
- Type: Lagoon
- Max. width: 212 hectares (520 acres)
- Average depth: 1 metre (3 ft 3 in)

The Étang de Palo (Note: Étang may be translated as "pond" or "lagoon".) is a coastal lagoon beside the Tyrrhenian Sea in the Haute-Corse department on the French island of Corsica. The lagoon is largely unspoiled and is considered ecologically valuable.

== Location ==
The Étang de Palo is on the east coast of Corsica 100 kilometres (62 mi) south of Bastia. It is in the commune of Ventiseri between the T10 coastal highway and the Mediterranean sea. It is south of the village of Mignataja and just north of the Solenzara Air Base. It lies between the mouths of the Travo River to the south and the Abatesco river to the north.

== Hydrology ==
The Étang de Palo formed about 6,000 years ago during the post-glacial global warming when a coastal depression was isolated from the sea by a sandy cordon of detrital material. It is a natural fresh water lagoon with an average depth of 1 metre (3 ft 3 in). It covers 212 hectares (520 acres) and is the fourth largest lagoon on the island. It is part of an almost continuous series of wetlands that stretch along 10 kilometres (6.2 mi) of the coast between the Fiumorbu and the Travo. A few small streams supply fresh water to the lagoon from a catchment area of 31 square kilometres (12 sq mi).

A sandbar 150 metres (490 ft) and 2.5 kilometres (1.6 mi) long separates the lagoon from the sea. A narrow channel is opened periodically to let nutrient-rich water escape and avoid eutrophication events. The lagoon is a natural reservoir that helps prevent floods in the surrounding plain. Apart from the opening to the sea created by a fisherman, the lagoon has hardly been modified by man and has no significant pollution. The aquaculture methods are unlikely to upset the biological or physico-chemical balance.

== Ecology ==
The Étang de Palo is owned by the Conservatoire du littoral and is managed by the Collectivity of Corsica. It is classified as a Zone naturelle d'intérêt écologique, faunistique et floristique. It was designated a Special Conservation Area and an Natura 2000 site in 1998. In September 2008, it was designated a Ramsar site.

The lagoon and its surrounding vegetation and sandy beaches is an important ecosystem. There are varied biotopes in a relatively small area, ranging from very dry to very humid, from freshwater to saltwater. The site includes the water body, stony soils, silty soils, swamps, and the sandy coastline. Vegetation includes salt meadows, woods, patches of tamarix and reed beds, which provide valuable habitats for birds. There are rare plant species such as the Coastal Mallow (Kosteletzkya pentacarpos. There is a magnificent population of Mount Etna broom (Genista aetnensis).

The bird population is typical. More than 110 species of bird winter in the lagoon or use it as a resting place during migration including heron, flamingo, coot, western marsh harrier, tawny pipit and black-winged stilt. The site is also rich in bats, fish, reptiles and amphibians. It is home to protected species of bats including Western barbastelle (Barbastella barbastellus), Common bent-wing bat (Miniopterus schreibersii), Long-fingered bat (Myotis capaccinii) and Geoffroy's bat (Myotis emarginatus). There are exceptional populations of European pond turtle and Hermann's tortoise.

== Exploitation ==
A professional fisherman uses the traditional aquaculture techniques for lagoons in Corsica and Italy, mainly harvesting eel and mullet. Bottarga (salted, cured fish roe) is also harvested. A cattle breeder uses the wet meadows to the north of the lagoon. Visitors swim and fish from the lido (sandbar). Hunters also make use of the lagoon.

== Gallery ==
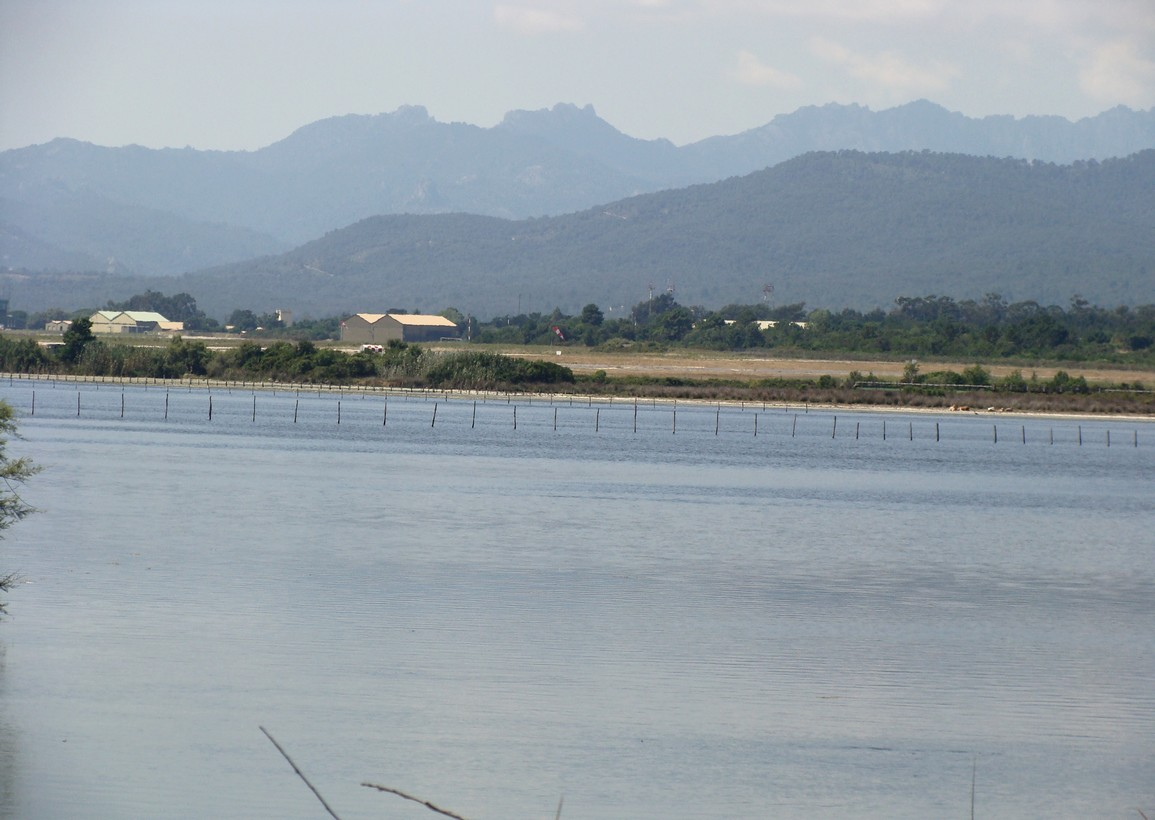
Gill net lines, airbase in background

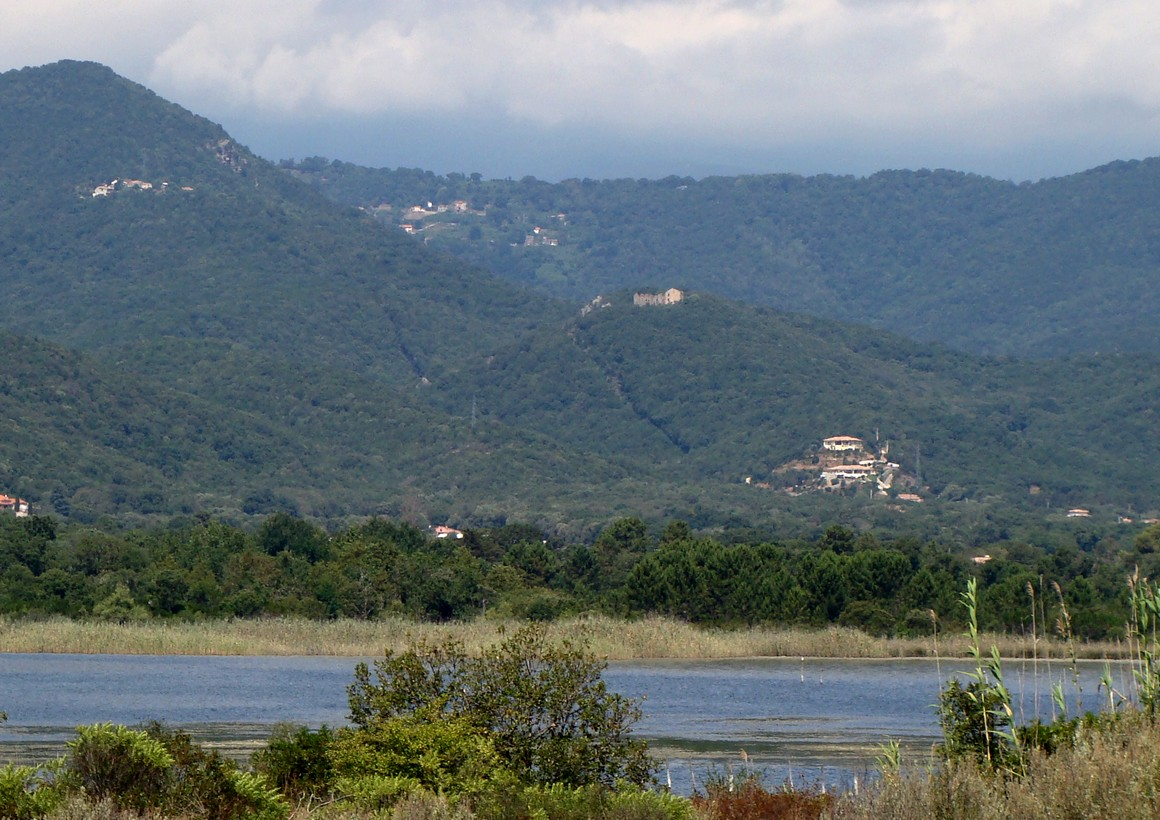
Hills behind the lagoon

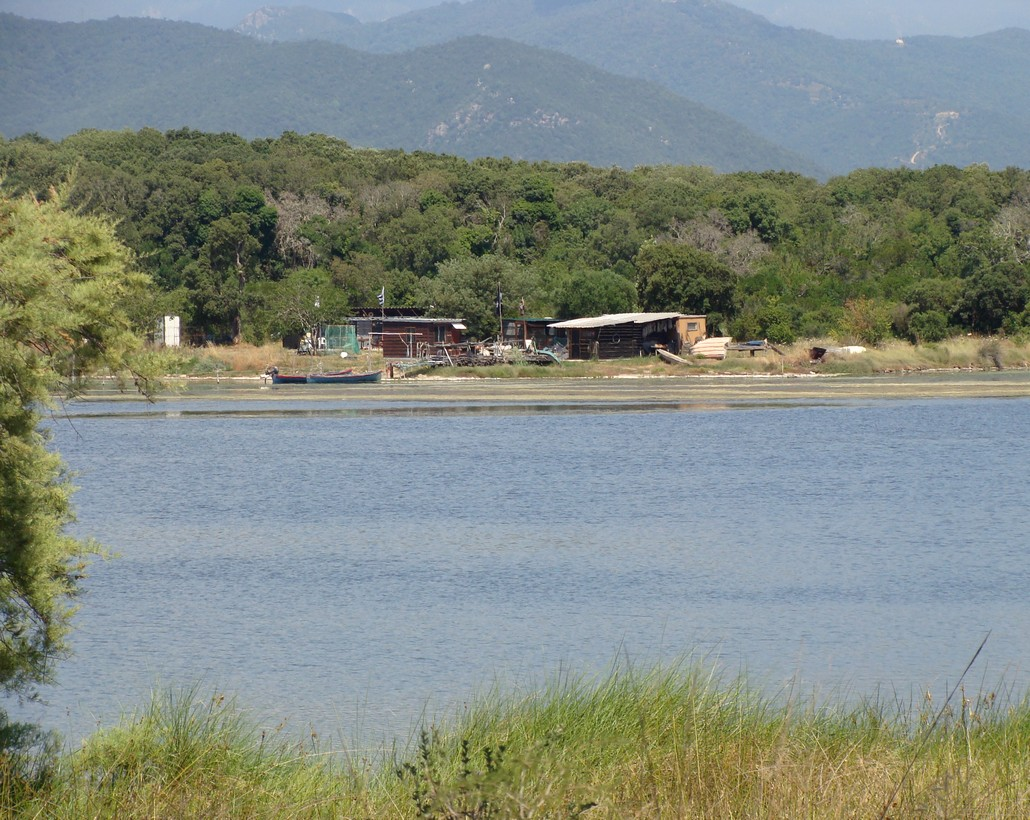
Fishing station

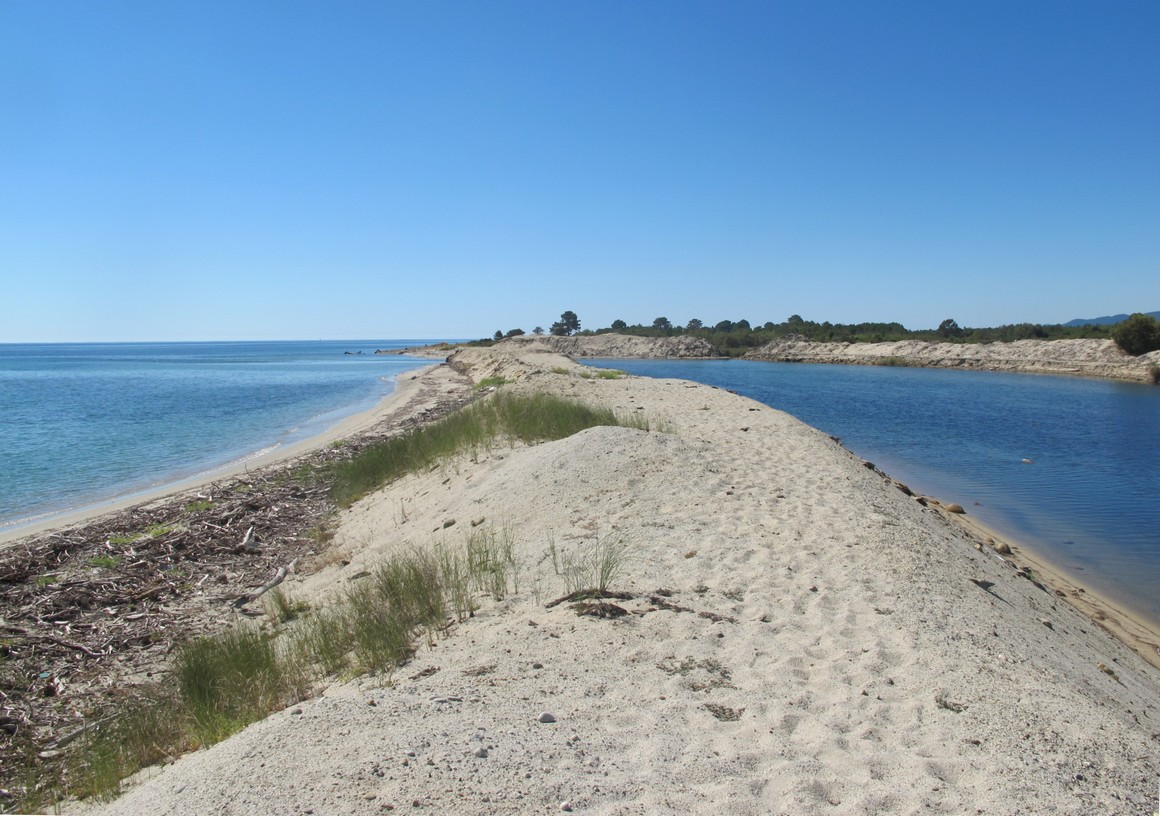
Dune barrier looking south

== Sources ==
- Étang de Palo (PDF) (in French), Association Ramsar France, Ministère de la transition écologique, February 2021
- Etang de Palo, Ramsar Sites Information Service
- "FR9400581 Etang de Palo et cordon dunaire", Natura 2000 en Corse (in French), OVEA
- "Way: Étang de Palo (28890162)", OpejStreetMap
