= Antisanti =

- Commune
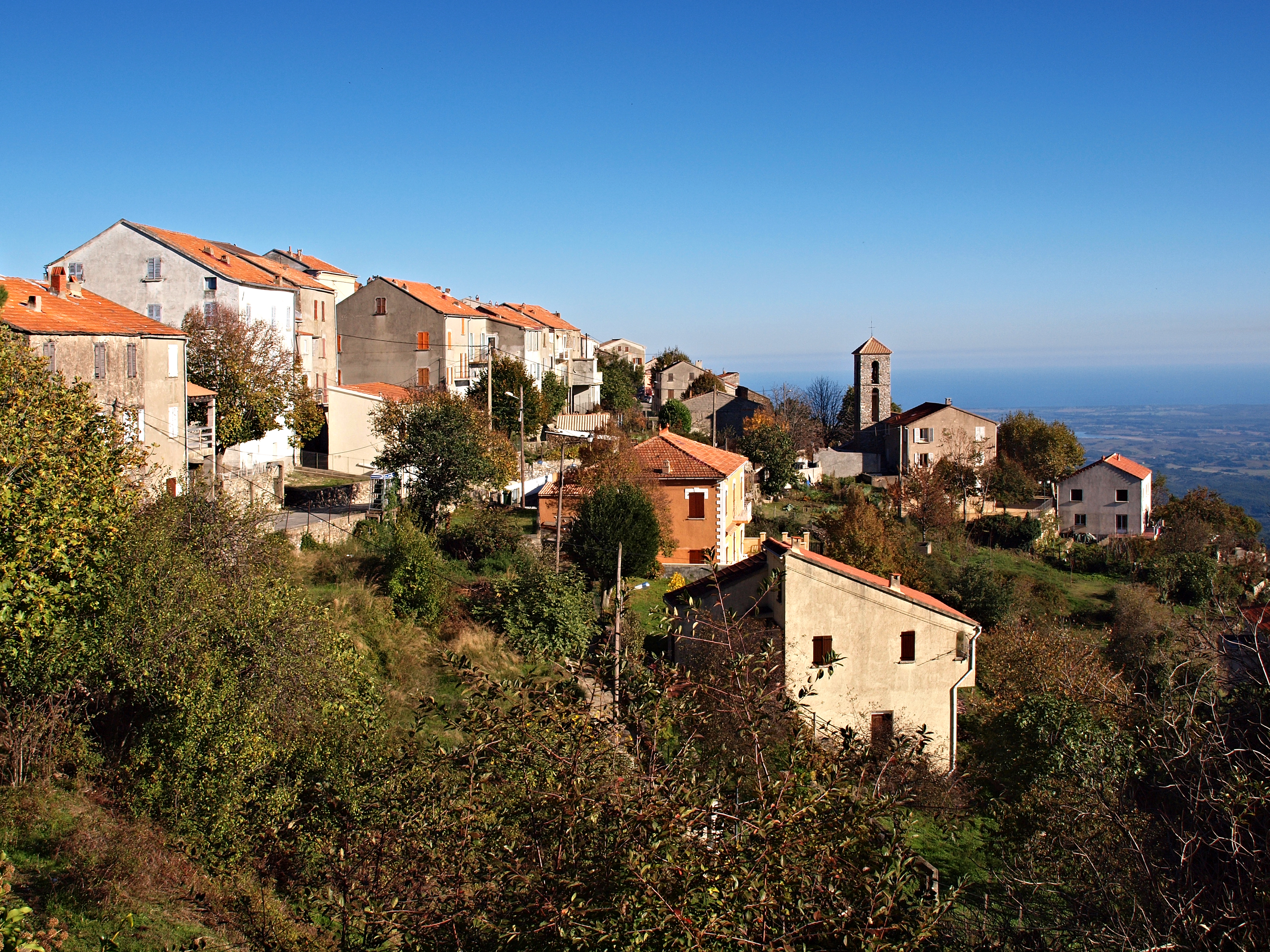
- The church and surrounding buildings in Antisanti
- Location of Antisanti
- Location within France Location within Corsica
- Coordinates: 42°10′04″N 9°20′48″E
- Country: France
- Region: Corsica
- Department: Haute-Corse
- Arrondissement: Corte
- Canton: Ghisonaccia

Government
  - Mayor (2020–2026): Anthony Alessandrini
- Area^{1}: 47.95 km^{2} (18.51 sq mi)
- Elevation: 750 m (2,460 ft)
- Highest elevation: 780 m (2,560 ft)
- Lowest elevation: 5 m (16 ft)
- Population (2023): 591
  - Density: 12.3/km^{2} (31.9/sq mi)
- Time zone: UTC+01:00 (CET)
  - Summer (DST): UTC+02:00 (CEST)
- INSEE/Postal code: 2B016 /20270
- ^{1} French Land Register data, which excludes lakes, ponds, glaciers > 1 km^{2} (0.386 sq mi or 247 acres) and river estuaries.

Antisanti (in Corsican Antisanti, pronounced [ɑ̃ŋ.ti.ˈzɑ̃ːŋ.ti]) is a commune in the Haute-Corse (Upper Corsica) department of France on the island of Corsica.

== Geography ==
Antisanti is a landlocked commune on the eastern side of Corsica overlooking the eastern plain of the island some 80 km south of Bastia and 12 km west by north-west of Aléria. It belonged to the ancient Pieve of Rogna and is now part of the Rogna in La micro-region located on the right bank of the Tavignano extending from Vivario to the plain. Access to the commune is by the minor road D43 from Aléria in the east passing through the heart of the commune and the village before continuing west to join the D143 south-east of Santo-Pietro-di-Venaco. There is also a connecting road to the D343 near Vezzani. National Highway N200 passes along the eastern and northern borders but there is no access to the commune.

The west of the commune is rugged and heavily forested, while the eastern half is on the plain with mostly farmland although still having significant forested areas.

The northern and eastern borders of the commune are formed by the Tavignano river with a large tributary flowing west through the centre of the commune to join it on the eastern border.

== History ==
In 1770 Antisanti was one of the least populated communes in the Piève of Rogna.

With the French Revolution of 1789 the Pieve of Sorba became the Canton of Vezzani in the district of Bastia.

Since 1954 Antisanti has been part of the Canton of Vezzani along with the communes of Aghione, Casevecchie, Noceta, Pietroso, Rospigliani, and Vezzani.

== Administration ==
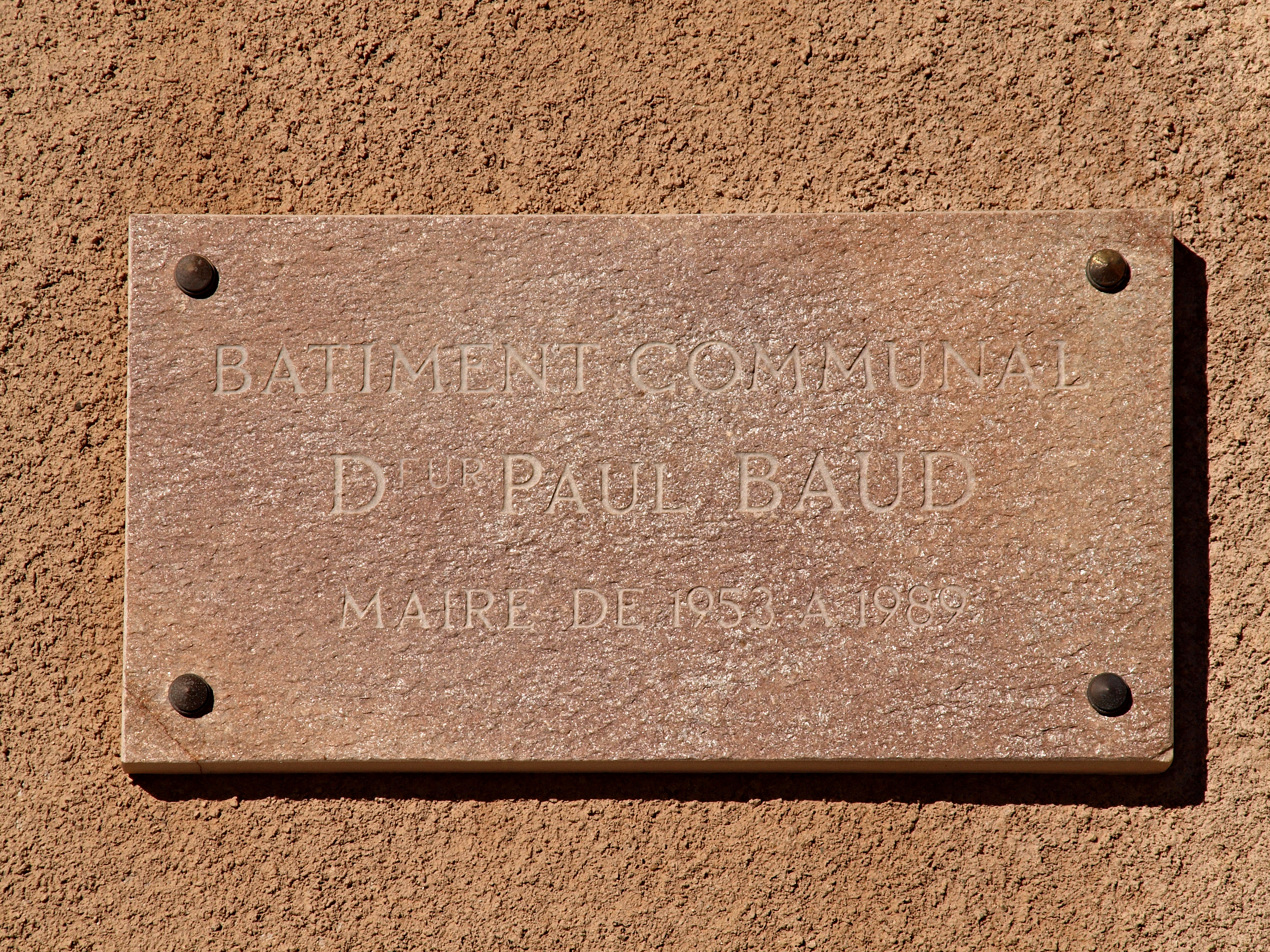
Plaque by Dr Baud, former Mayor

List of Successive Mayors

From	To	Name
1953	1989	Paul Baud
2001	2026	Anthony Alessandrini

== Demography ==
The inhabitants of the commune are known as Antisantais or Antisantaises in French.

Historical population

Year	Pop.	±% p.a.
1800	379	—
1821	474	+1.07%
1846	795	+2.09%
1872	801	+0.03%
1901	897	+0.39%
1926	708	−0.94%
1946	530	−1.44%
1962	493	−0.45%
1968	486	−0.24%

Year	Pop.	±% p.a.
1975	534	+1.35%
1982	661	+3.09%
1990	500	−3.43%
1999	418	−1.97%
2007	378	−1.25%
2012	429	+2.56%
2017	546	+4.94%
2023	591	+1.33%

Source: EHESS and INSEE

== Economy ==
Antisanti markets 40% of the national production of Clementines from its vast orchards.

== Cultural and heritage ==
=== Civil architecture ===
- A War Memorial on the side facade of the parish church.

=== Religious heritage ===
- The 'Parish church of Saint-Pierre-aux-Liens. Built in 1894, this small baroque church was remodeled and enlarged in 1944.
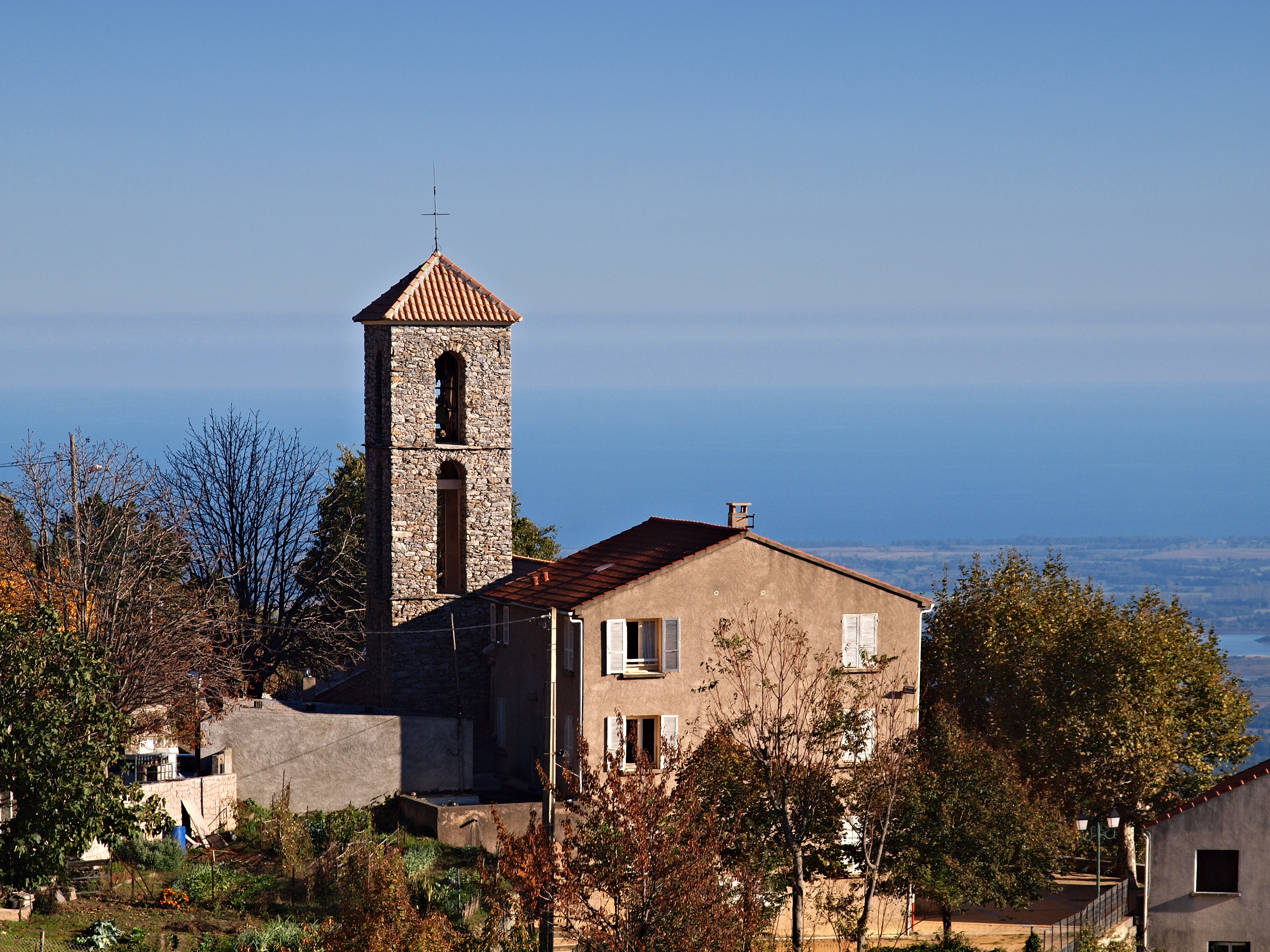
Town hall and church

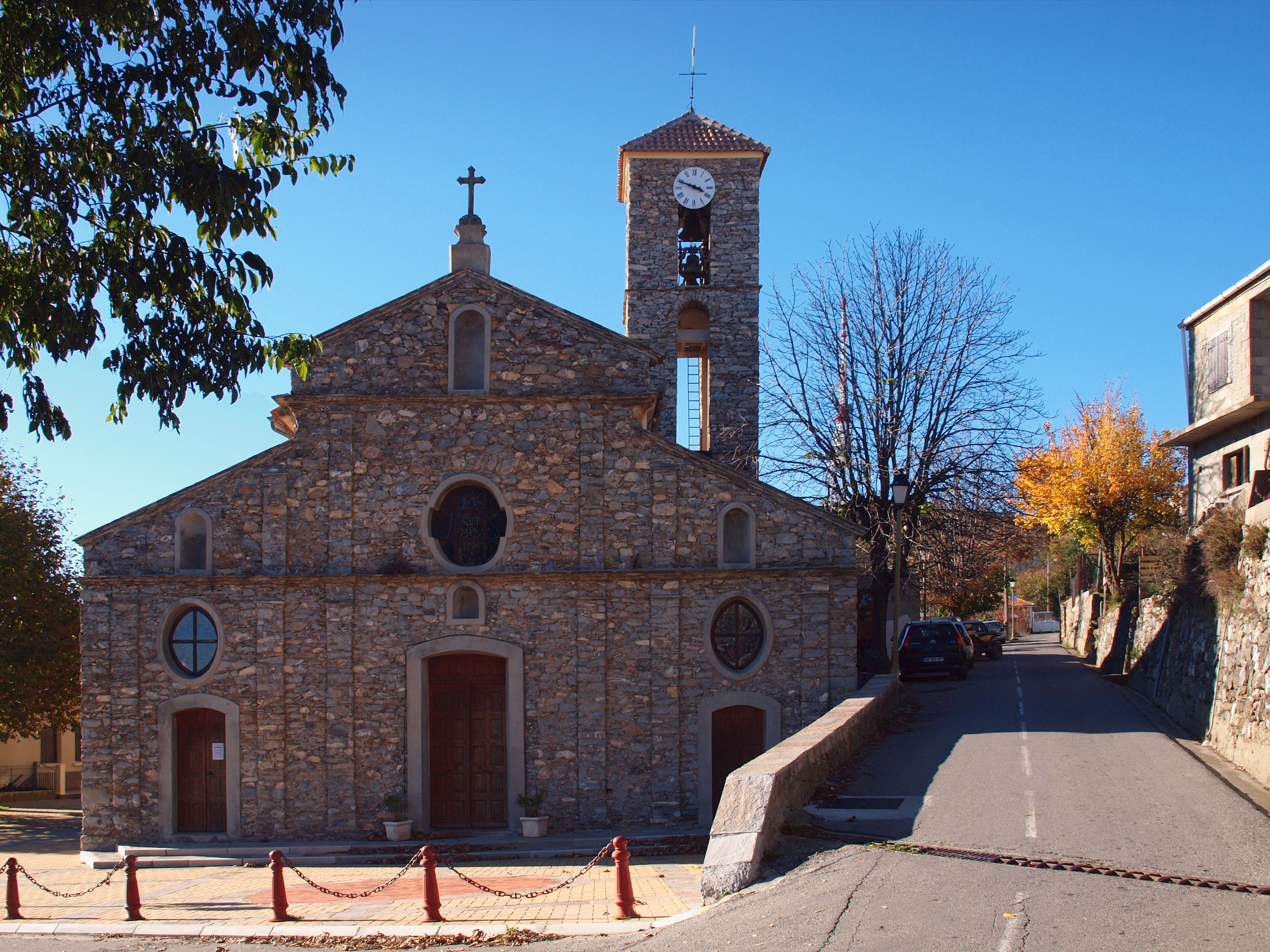
Parish church

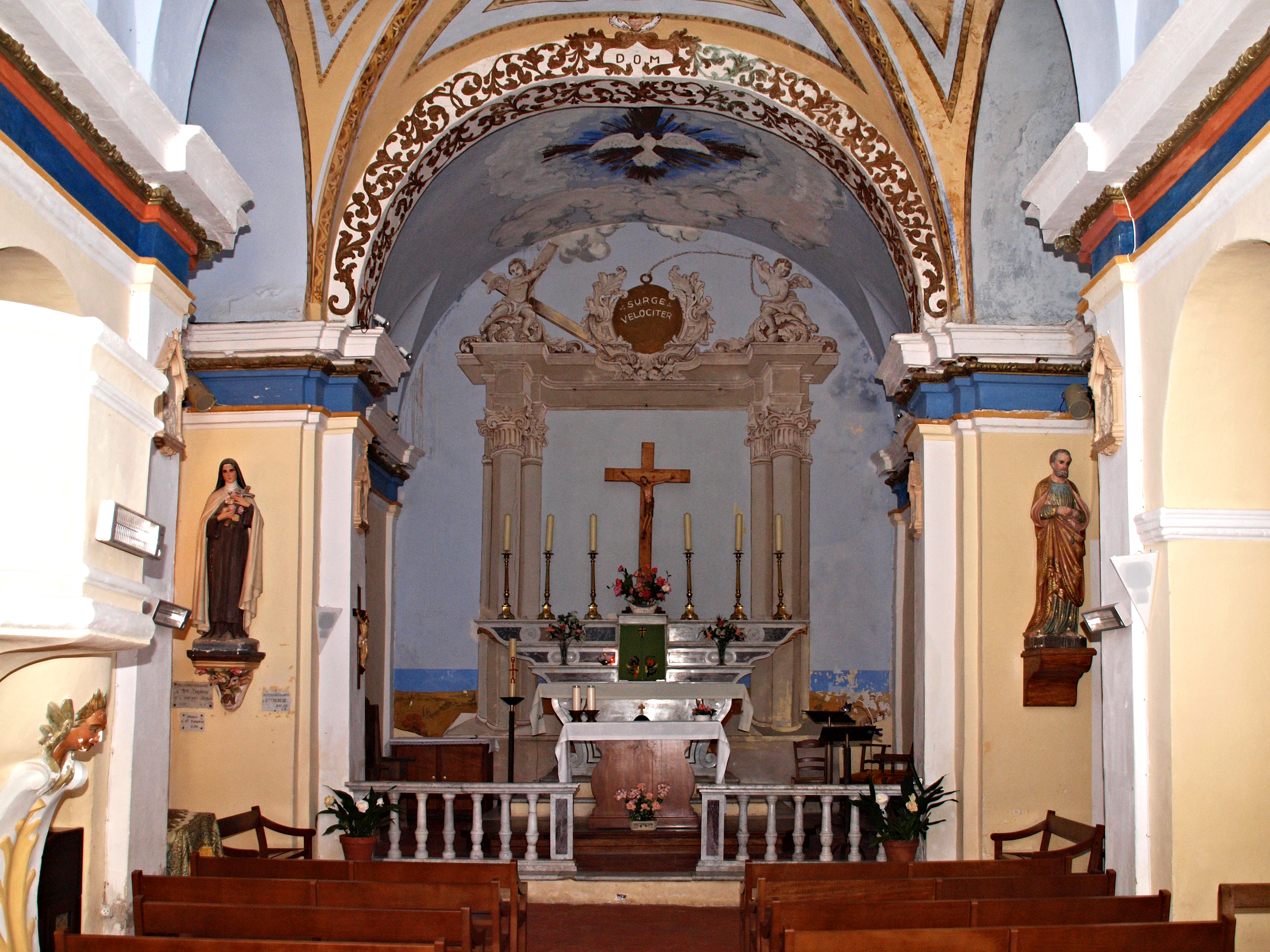
Interior of the church

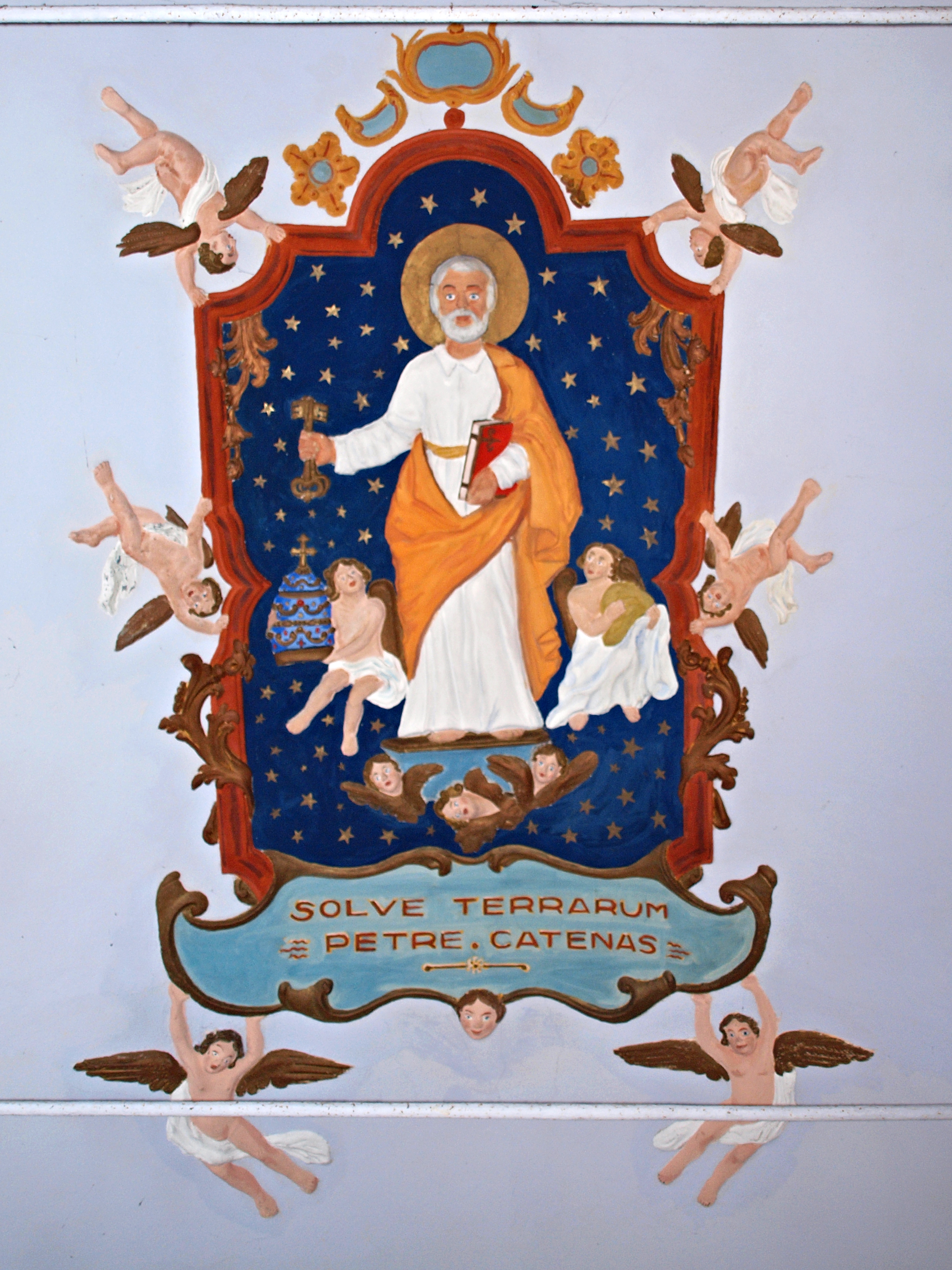
Ornate ceiling of the nave

== Notable resident ==
Politician Georges Benedetti was born in Antisanti on 29 July 1930.

== See also ==
- Communes of the Haute-Corse department
