= Abatesco =

River of the Haute-Corse department in Corsica

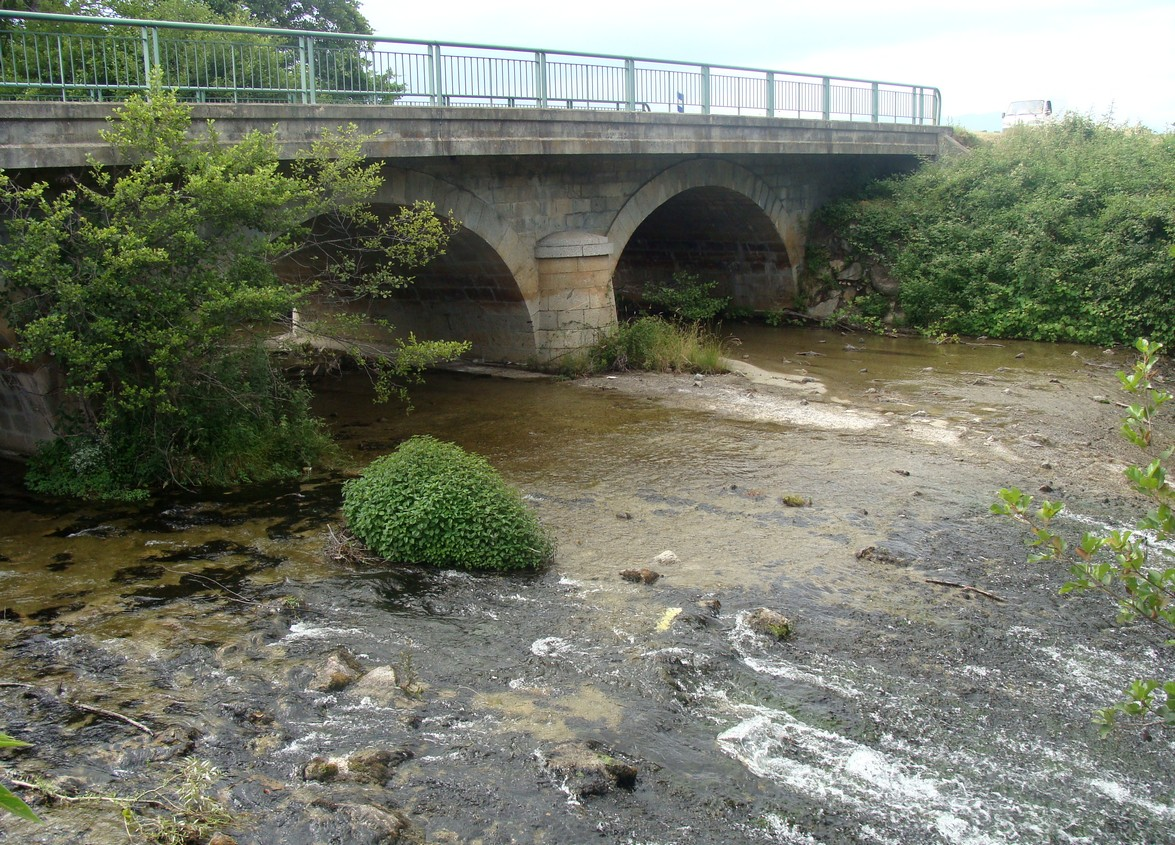
- The Abatesco under the RT 10 bridge between Ghisonaccia and Sari-Solenzara, a small distance above its mouth

- Location within Corsica
- Native name: Abatescu (Corsican)

Location
- Country: France
- Region: Corsica
- Department: Haute-Corse
- Arrondissement: Corte

Physical characteristics
- Source: 200 metres (660 ft) south of Monte Formicola
  - location: San-Gavino-di-Fiumorbo
  - coordinates: 41°56′22″N 9°13′11″E
  - elevation: 1,700 metres (5,600 ft)
- Mouth: Tyrrhenian Sea
  - location: Serra-di-Fiumorbo
  - coordinates: 41°58′29″N 9°25′37″E
- Length: 24.8 kilometres (15.4 mi)
- Basin size: 111 square kilometres (43 sq mi)

Basin features
- Tributaries
  - left: Buja, Macini
  - right: Biaccino, Aglia

The Abatesco (Corsican: Abatescu) is a French coastal river which flows through the Haute-Corse department and empties into the Tyrrhenian Sea.

== Geography ==
The watercourse is 24.8 kilometres (15.4 mi) long.

The Abatesco originates 200 metres (660 ft) south of the summit of Monte Formicola, which is 1,981 metres (6,499 ft) high, at an altitude of 1,700 metres (5,600 ft) in the commune of San-Gavino-di-Fiumorbo.

The source is very close to the famous GR20 hiking trail. The upper section is called the Tassi torrent. It only takes the name of Abatesco about 3 kilometres (1.9 mi) from its source.

It first flows from southwest to northeast, then generally flows from west to east. It flows into the Tyrrhenian Sea in the commune of Serra-di-Fiumorbo.

Neighboring coastal rivers are the Fiumorbo to the north and the Travo to the south.

== Watershed municipalities and cantons ==
In the Haute-Corse department alone, the Abatesco drains four communes within one canton:

- Communes from upstream to downstream are: San-Gavino-di-Fiumorbo (source), Isolaccio-di-Fiumorbo, Prunelli-di-Fiumorbo, Serra-di-Fiumorbo (mouth).
- The Abatesco runs through the canton of Prunelli-di-Fiumorbo, the most southerly canton of Haute-Corse, in the arrondissement of Corte.

On almost all of its route, it serves as a boundary for the communes it runs along: Serra-di-Fiumorbo on its right bank, San-Gavino, then Isolaccio and finally Prunelli on its left bank.

== Watershed ==
The surface of the Abatesco watershed is estimated as 111 square kilometres (43 sq mi) by Sandre, and as 89 square kilometres (34 sq mi) by a study published in the French Bulletin of Fishing and Fish Farming.

== Managing body ==
The managing body since passage of the Corsican law of 22 January 2002 has been the Corsican Basin Committee (Comité de bassin de Corse).

== Tributaries ==
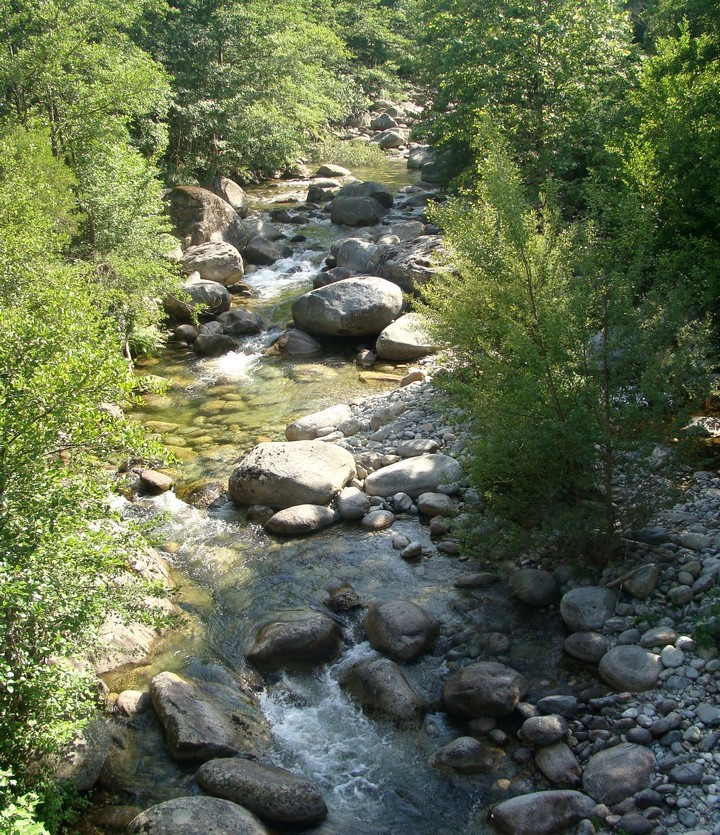
The Abatesco at Pietrapola

The Abastesco has nineteen referenced tributaries:

Tributary	Upper part	L/R	Length	Commune(s)
Benacciola		left	1.2 km	San-Gavino-di-Fiumorbo and Serra-di-Fiumorbo
Fiumicetti		left	1.7 km	San-Gavino-di-Fiumorbo and Serra-di-Fiumorbo
Vanga (Note: Vanga means "spade" in Corsican) d'Anioli		right	1.1 km	Serra-di-Fiumorbo
Cupin		left	1.8 km	San-Gavino-di-Fiumorbo
Carena		right	1.8 km	Serra-di-Fiumorbo
Maini	Cardiccia	left	4.1 km	San-Gavino-di-Fiumorbo
←Laparo		left	1.8 km	San-Gavino-di-Fiumorbo
Furone		right	1.4 km	Serra-di-Fiumorbo
Corbavodo		left	0.9 km	San-Gavino-di-Fiumorbo
Zevane		right	1 km	Serra-di-Fiumorbo
Tualu		left	1.3 km	San-Gavino-di-Fiumorbo
Piero Biancajo		left	1.4 km	San-Gavino-di-Fiumorbo
Buja	Trefontane; Trejontane	left	4.9 km	Isolaccio-di-Fiumorbo, San-Gavino-di-Fiumorbo; Includes the Bughjia waterfalls, renowned canyoning site
← Arena Bianca		right	3.2 km	San-Gavino-di-Fiumorbo; Source at the Punta di Campolongo (1,695 m) close to the GR20
←← Aria		left	2.1 km	San-Gavino-di-Fiumorbo; Source less than 200 meters from the GR20
← Pulitrello		left	1.4 km	San-Gavino-di-Fiumorbo
← Codola		left	3 km	Isolaccio-di-Fiumorbo, San-Gavino-di-Fiumorbo
← Foirinaccia		left	1.7 km	San-Gavino-di-Fiumorbo
Sersa		left	1.5 km	San-Gavino-di-Fiumorbo, Isolaccio-di-Fiumorbo
Tribbaldo		left	2.4 km	Isolaccio-di-Fiumorbo waters the village of Pietrapola with the only approved spa in Corsica.
Saparetto		left	2.4 km	Isolaccio-di-Fiumorbo
Vergajolo		left	2 km	Prunelli-di-Fiumorbo
Varciapone		left	1.3 km	Prunelli-di-Fiumorbo
Forcina		left	0.7 km	Prunelli-di-Fiumorbo
Biaccino	Sambuchelli	right	8.7 km	Ventiseri, Serra-di-Fiumorbo
← Anzagara'		left	4 km	Serra-di-Fiumorbo
←← Minagoli		right	1.4 km	Serra-di-Fiumorbo
←←← Juva		left	1.8 km	Serra-di-Fiumorbo
Sindoli		right	1.4 km	Serra-di-Fiumorbo
Carpiniccia		right	2.1 km	
Aglia	Acquaniella	right	8.8 km	Serra-di-Fiumorbo.

== Strahler number ==
The Strahler number of the Abatesco river is five from the Biaccino, Anzagara, Minagoli and Juva tributaries.

== Human presence ==
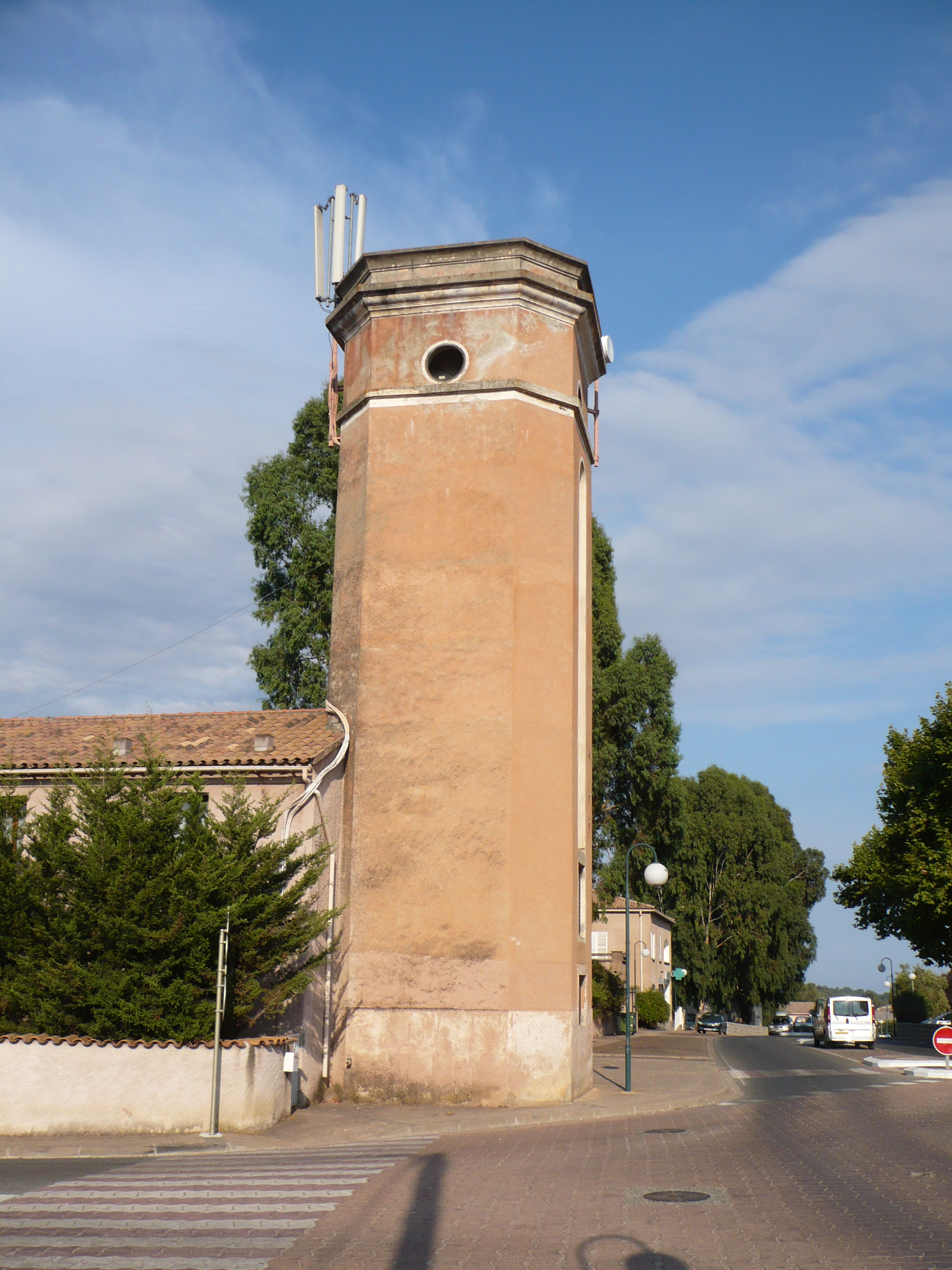
The FORTEF tower in Migliacciaro

In the valley, in the places called Abbazia, Agnatello, Calzarello and Catastajo, a whole wood industry was born and prospered, run by the FORTEF company (Forêts - Terres et Forces du Fiumorbo). It extracted 6,000 cubic metres (210,000 cu ft) of sawed timber and employed 800 people in 1935, with 4,200 hectares (10,000 acres) of forests and 1,200 hectares (3,000 acres) of cultivable land. It fell into disuse in the nineteenth century. In particular, at the height of 69 metres (226 ft) on the Abatesco, a dam was built and hydroelectric plants (horizontal Pelton type or Francis type turbines) at the place called Agnatello, supplied the timber industry which also existed at less than a kilometer, at a place called Abbazia at altitudes of 54 to 38 metres (177 to 125 ft). In these same places, Corsican railways built a large railway bridge.

By the sea, less than 1 kilometre (0.62 mi), and at an altitude of 9 metres (30 ft) the RT 10 (formerly RN 198) passes over the Abatesco. The old Roman road crossed about 500 metres (1,600 ft) further north-west of this bridge, near the place called Chiarata.

On the river's course there are the Moulin de Branca and the Moulin de Biaccino, while the Moulin de Rizzale is on the Biaccino stream.

== Ecology ==
The river and its tributaries are populated with trout. A devastating flood for the fish population occurred in September 1989.

The mouth of the river has been classified as a Zone naturelle d'intérêt écologique, faunistique et floristique (ZNIEFF) since 1985 covering 162 hectares (400 acres), which includes the Canna marshes and the Gradugine pond to the north, and the Palo pond to the south.

== Sources ==
- Beaudo, D.; Baril, D.; Roch, B.; Le Baro, M.; Cattaneo-Berreb, G.; Berreb, P. (1995), "Recolonisation d'un cours d'eau dévasté - Contribution respective des truites sauvages et domestiques" (PDF), Bull. Fr. Pêche Piscic. (in French): 259–266
- Cours d'eau - L'Abatesco (in French), Sandre; Service d'administration nationale des données et référentiels sur l'eau
- Faivre, Thierry (2004), Vues de la vallée de L'Abatesco (in French)
- geoportail: le portail national de la connaissance du territoire (in French), IGN
- Le Comité de bassin de Corse (in French), Agence de l'eau Rhône Méditerranée Corse
