= Aglia (Abatesco) =

Stream in the department of Haute-Corse, Corsica

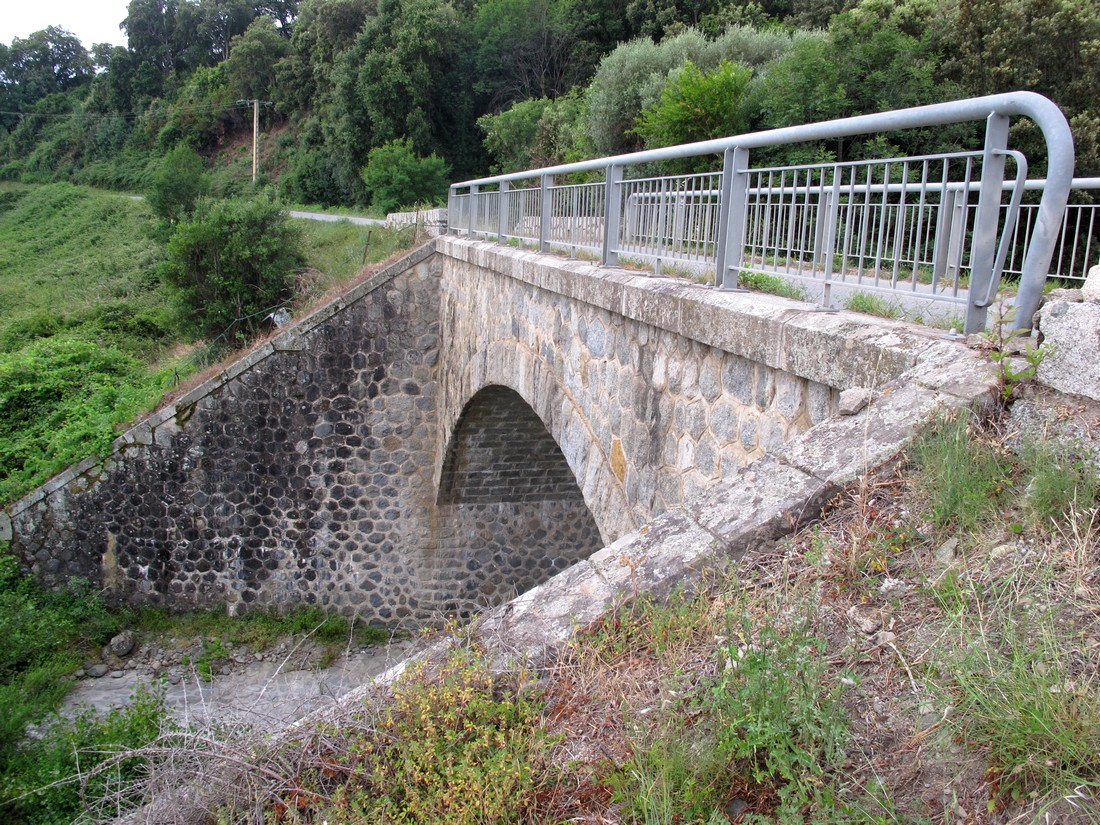
- Pont de Nodu, a former railway bridge, crossing the stream

- Location within Corsica
- Native name: Ruisseau d'Aglia (French)

Location
- Country: France
- Region: Corsica
- Department: Haute-Corse
- Commune: Serra-di-Fiumorbo

Physical characteristics
- Source: East of Punta di Quarcio Grosso
  - location: Ventiseri
  - coordinates: 41.95561°N 9.31646°E
- Mouth: Abatesco
  - coordinates: 41.98400°N 9.38467°E
- Length: 9 kilometres (5.6 mi)

Basin features
- Progression: Abatesco→ Tyrrhenian Sea

The Aglia (French: Ruisseau d'Aglia) is a 9 kilometres (5.6 mi) long stream in the department of Haute-Corse, Corsica, a tributary of the Abatesco.

== History ==
Some historians say there may have been a town called Aglia along the stream of that name. The stream gives its name to the prehistoric site of Aglia in Serra-di-Fiumorbo (Sarra di Fiumorbu). When the railway line was being built in 1927 a prehistoric necropolis, known as Aglia, was uncovered at a place called Nodo. It has many tombs, each covered by a curved slab, which are arranged in groups. The skeletons are accompanied by stone axes, arrowheads and spears, and some have arrangements of small multi-colored pebbles and fragments of quartz.

== Geography ==
The Aglia is one of the three main tributaries of the Abatesco, the others being the Buva and the Biaccino. It rises in Ventiseri to the east of Punta di Quarcio Grosso, a 1,045 metres (3,428 ft) peak. It flows for 9 kilometres (5.6 mi) through Serra-di-Fiumorbo in a northeast direction to join the Abatesco to the south of Morta. The stream has no named tributaries. It crosses the communes of Prunelli-di-Fiumorbo, Serra-di-Fiumorbo and Ventiseri.

A local road running west from Pont de l'Abatesco to the D545 crosses the stream at Tozzi and then follows it upstream to a point just north of Pont du Nodo where the D545 crosses the stream. The Pont du Nodo was formerly a bridge on the Côte orientale corse railway line, and has particularly well-preserved masonry.

== Sources ==
- Chiari, Laurent; Laborde, Mathieu, "Serra-di-Fiumorbo", Médiathèque Culturelle de la Corse et des Corses (in French), Università di Corsica Pasquale Paoli / Collectivité Territoriale de Corse
- "Fium'Orbu Castellu", France, le trésor des régions (in French)
- Hausmann, Willi; Hausmann, Kristin (2019), Corse: Mare e Monti - Mare a mare. Toutes les étapes. Avec traces GPS (in French), Bergverlag Rother GmbH, pp. 208 pages, ISBN 9783763349487
- Moretti, Frédéric (2017), Plan de prévention des risques naturels d'inondations des communes de Ghisonaccia, Prunelli di Fiumorbu et Serra di Fiumorbu (PDF) (in French), Departement de la Haute Corse
- "Relation: Ruisseau d'Aglia (10522725)", OpenStreetMap
- "Ruisseau d'Aglia", Sandre (in French), Service d'administration nationale des données et référentiels sur l'eau
