= Serra-di-Fiumorbo =

- Commune
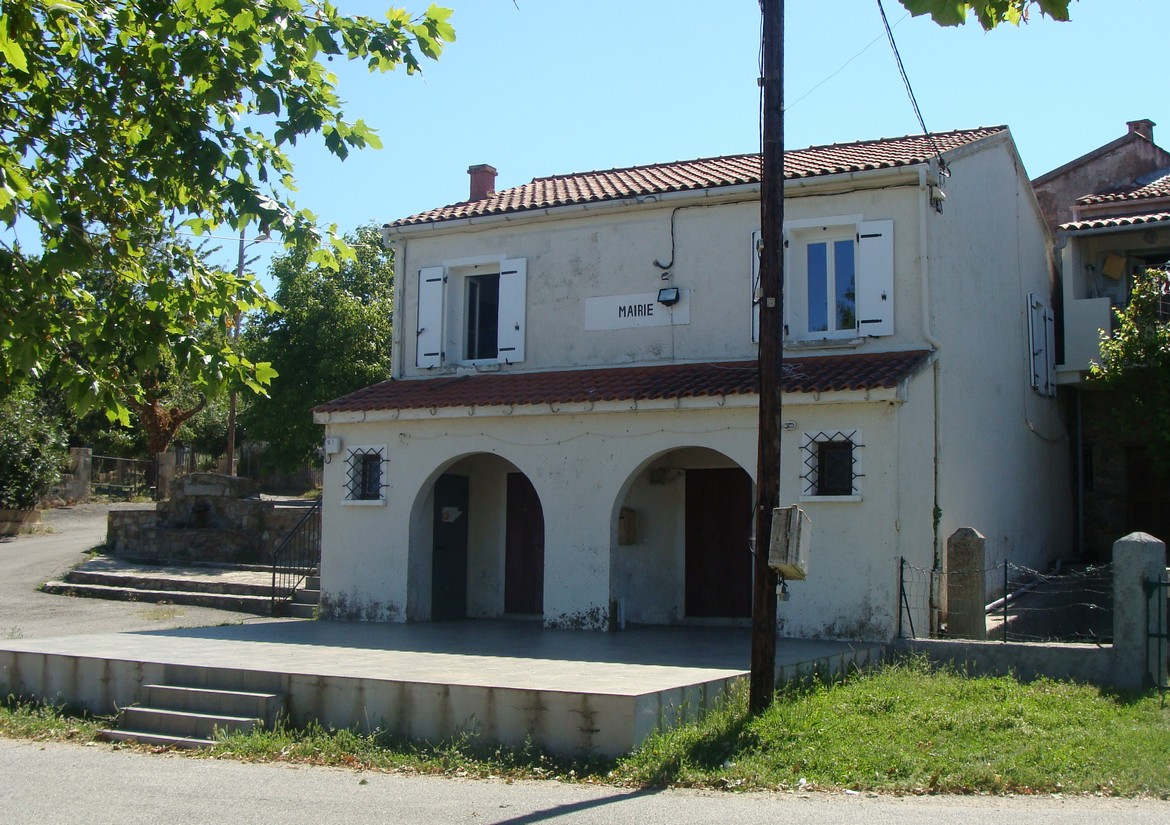
- The town hall in Serra-di-Fiumorbo

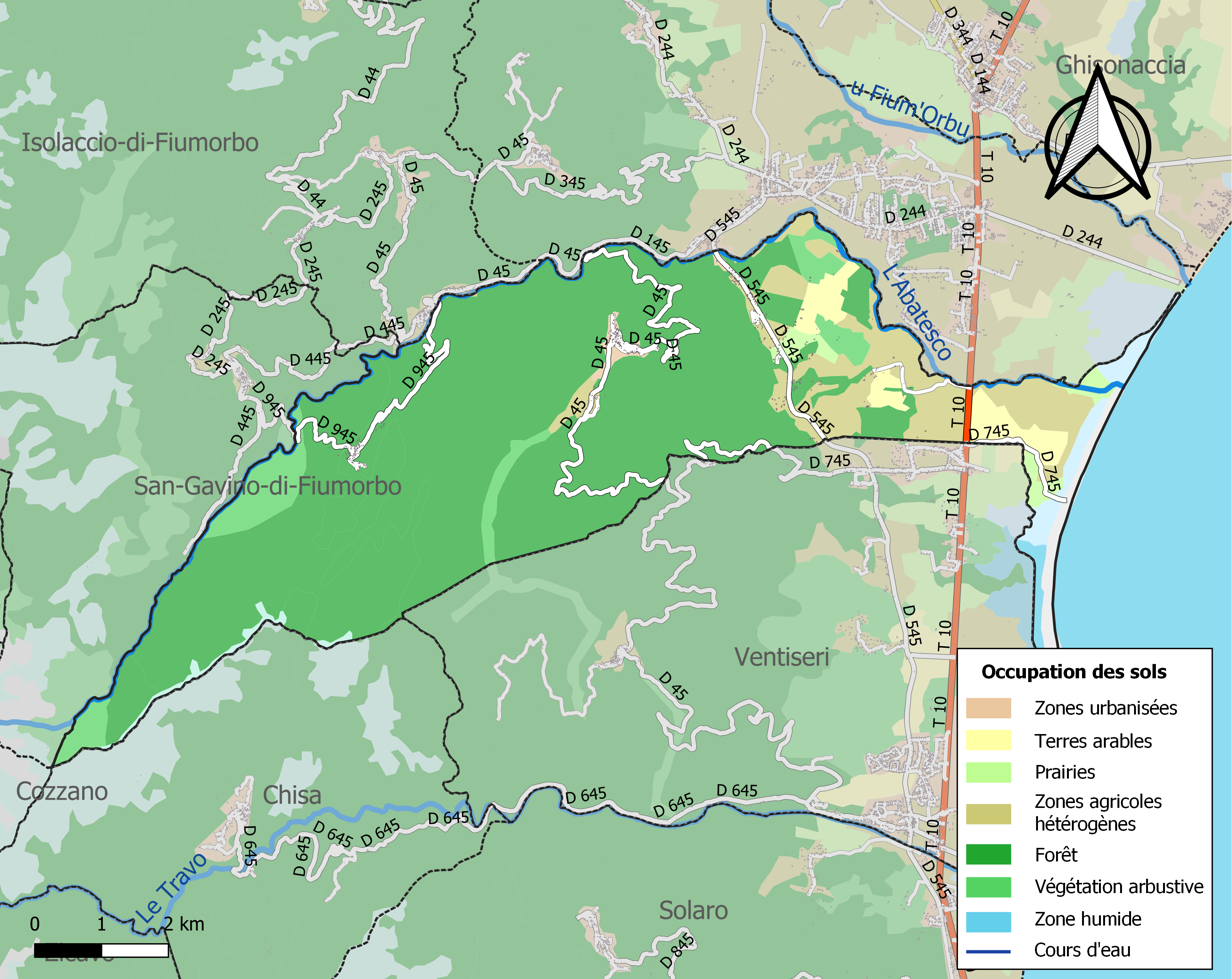
- Soil types in the commune
- Location of Serra-di-Fiumorbo
- Location within France Location within Corsica
- Coordinates: 41°59′10″N 9°20′12″E
- Country: France
- Region: Corsica
- Department: Haute-Corse
- Arrondissement: Corte
- Canton: Fiumorbo-Castello

Government
  - Mayor (2020–2026): Jean-Noël Profizi
- Area^{1}: 43.2 km^{2} (16.7 sq mi)
- Elevation: 456 m (1,496 ft)
- Highest elevation: 1,560 m (5,120 ft)
- Lowest elevation: 0 m (0 ft)
- Population (2023): 365
  - Density: 8.45/km^{2} (21.9/sq mi)
- Time zone: UTC+01:00 (CET)
  - Summer (DST): UTC+02:00 (CEST)
- INSEE/Postal code: 2B277 /20240
- ^{1} French Land Register data, which excludes lakes, ponds, glaciers > 1 km^{2} (0.386 sq mi or 247 acres) and river estuaries.

Serra-di-Fiumorbo is a commune in the Haute-Corse department of France on the island of Corsica.

The Aglia runs through the commune from west to east, to join the Abatesco, which defines the northern boundary of the commune.

== Population ==
Historical population
Year	Pop.	±% p.a.
1968	292	—
1975	214	−4.34%
1982	201	−0.89%
1990	205	+0.25%
1999	256	+2.50%
2007	298	+1.92%
2012	317	+1.24%
2017	335	+1.11%
2023	365	+1.44%
Source: INSEE

== See also ==
- Communes of the Haute-Corse department
