= Canton of Fiumorbo-Castello =

Coordinates: 42.01°N 9.32°E

The canton of Fiumorbo-Castello is an administrative division of the Haute-Corse department, southeastern France. It was created at the French canton reorganisation which came into effect in March 2015. Its seat is in Prunelli-di-Fiumorbo.

It consists of the following communes:

1. Chisa
2. Ghisoni
3. Isolaccio-di-Fiumorbo
4. Lugo-di-Nazza
5. Noceta
6. Pietroso
7. Poggio-di-Nazza
8. Prunelli-di-Fiumorbo
9. Rospigliani
10. San-Gavino-di-Fiumorbo
11. Serra-di-Fiumorbo
12. Solaro
13. Ventiseri
14. Vezzani
