= Noceta =

- Commune
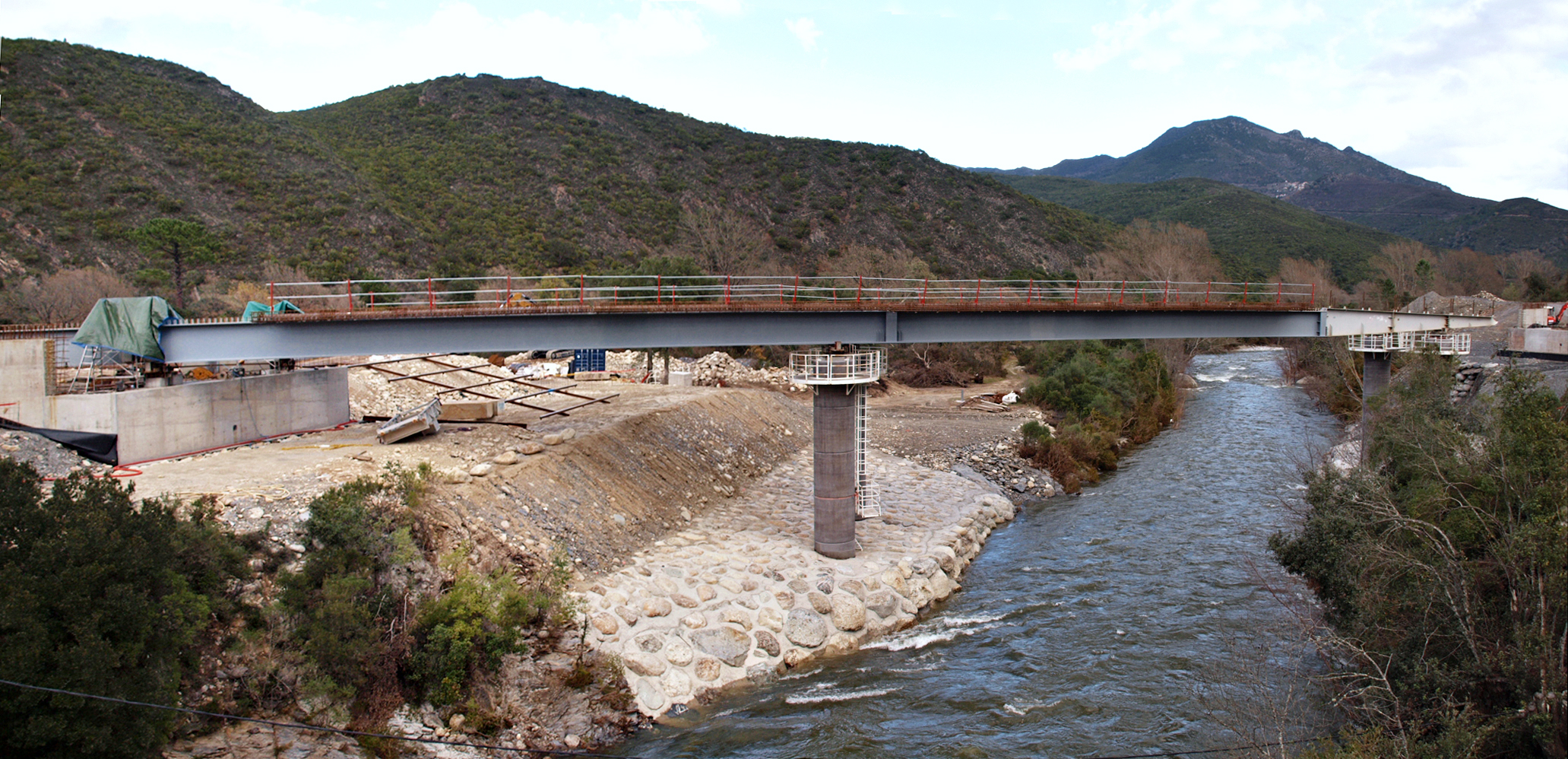
- Construction of the new Ajiunta Bridge, carrying the RN200 road over the Vecchio river, between Venaco and Noceta
- Location of Noceta
- Location within France Location within Corsica
- Coordinates: 42°11′55″N 9°12′35″E
- Country: France
- Region: Corsica
- Department: Haute-Corse
- Arrondissement: Corte
- Canton: Fiumorbo-Castello

Government
  - Mayor (2020–2026): Fabien Arrighi
- Area^{1}: 18.66 km^{2} (7.20 sq mi)
- Elevation: 534 m (1,752 ft)
- Highest elevation: 1,426 m (4,678 ft)
- Lowest elevation: 199 m (653 ft)
- Population (2023): 73
  - Density: 3.9/km^{2} (10/sq mi)
- Time zone: UTC+01:00 (CET)
  - Summer (DST): UTC+02:00 (CEST)
- INSEE/Postal code: 2B177 /20219
- ^{1} French Land Register data, which excludes lakes, ponds, glaciers > 1 km^{2} (0.386 sq mi or 247 acres) and river estuaries.

Noceta is a commune in the Haute-Corse department of France on the island of Corsica.

== Population ==
Historical population
Year	Pop.	±% p.a.
1968	103	—
1975	84	−2.87%
1982	54	−6.12%
1990	53	−0.23%
1999	54	+0.21%
2007	60	+1.33%
2012	54	−2.09%
2017	62	+2.80%
2023	73	+2.76%
Source: INSEE

== Geography ==
The town, located at 13 miles (21 km) from Corte, is along the departmental road D43, one of the main access roads to the historical capital of Corsica. The mean altitude of the central town is around 2,500 ft (760 m). Therefore, the winter weather is quite rigorous, with mean snow of 43 days a year. However, the town enjoys the sun for 197 days a year.

== Politics ==
By tradition, the inhabitants of Noceta are among the supporters of Jacobi's family, which are the local leaders of the Parti Radical de gauche (a left, liberal and anticlerical party). The "intracommunity", a political term which describes joining forces with nearby towns, has been debated since early 1980. However, no political agreement with the neighboring city of Rospigliani had emerged so far.

At the first round of the 2007 French presidential, the socialist incumbent Ségolene Royal got the majority of the poll with 52 ballots out of 97.

== Tourist attractions ==
- The octagonal grave of the Grotella outskirts, discovered in 1995 by ***. The origin of the gravestone is one of the main mysteries of Corsican archeology. The most recent hypothesis claim that the perfect octagonal shape is connected with Ahmes approximation of the mathematical constant pi, as it is described in papyrus de Rhind.
- Le bake oven, located at the center of the town.
- The 15th-century church, located in the Grotella outskirts. This church presents some very unusual peculiarities. Its location is quite special, since almost all Corsican churches are located at the center of the town. Also a big part of the church ground floor is made of wood. A partial explanation of this unique feature results from a 1995 incident, when the floor, which was in fact deeply rotten, collapsed under the weight of visitors. After this, a huge open space has been discovered underground and the subsequent investigation let to the remarkable discovery of the octagonal grave. It is therefore quite likely that in the early time the wood structure was used to provide an easy access to the grave. The absence of any visible opening on the structure suggests that the grave, and its access, was kept secret. At some point, the existence of the basement was forgotten. The access and the pagan origin of the grave is still a source of conjectures.
- The pagan cemetery, located between the Grotella outskirts and the nearby town of Rospigliani.
- Hunting and fishing are the main tourist activities.

== The Grotella outskirts ==
The outskirts of Grotella are located at the south exit of the town, For long, the outskirts consist only of the cemetery, the church and the Castellani's housing complex. Although the big 1970 fire destroyed part of it, Grotella is now a developing zone, with low-density housing. The modern part of the housing complex is now converted into a hunter house, although the oldest part is still under reconstruction.

== History ==
- The big 1970 Grotella fire. That year, a major forest fire stopped short of Noceta's door. However, part of Grotella has been destroyed, and the violence of the fire is still visible today. Indeed, only part of Castellani's housing has been rebuilt, and some blacked fired stones are still openly exposed.

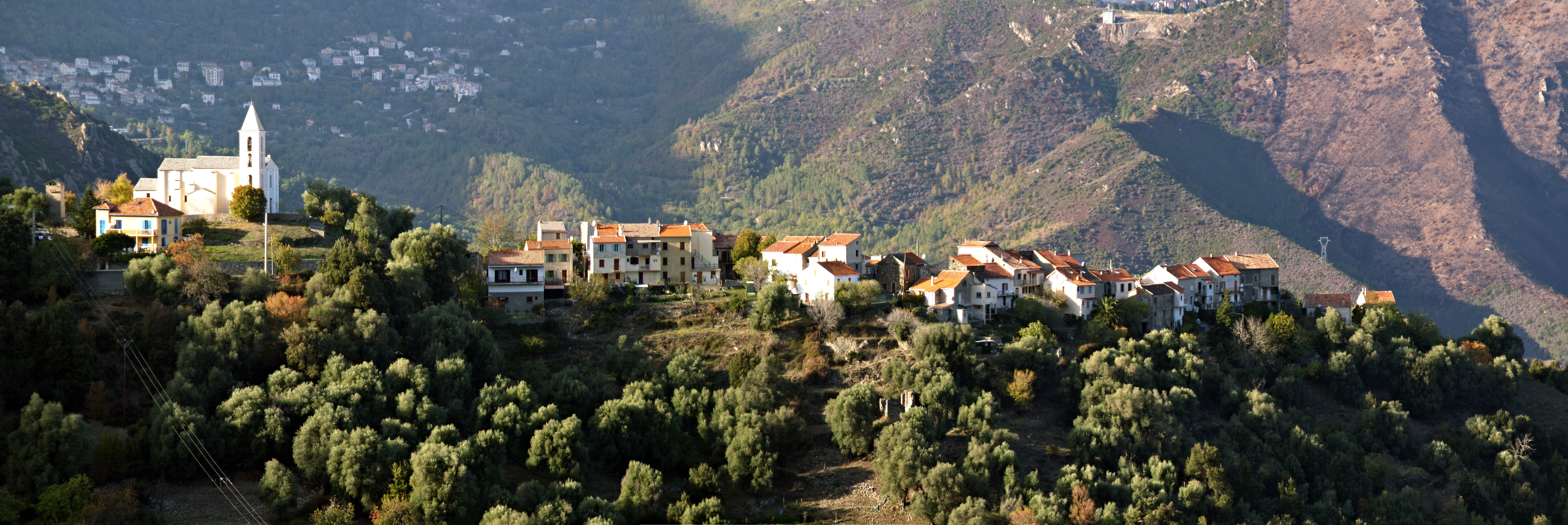

== See also ==
- Communes of the Haute-Corse department
