= Travo River =

River in the department of Haute-Corse, Corsica

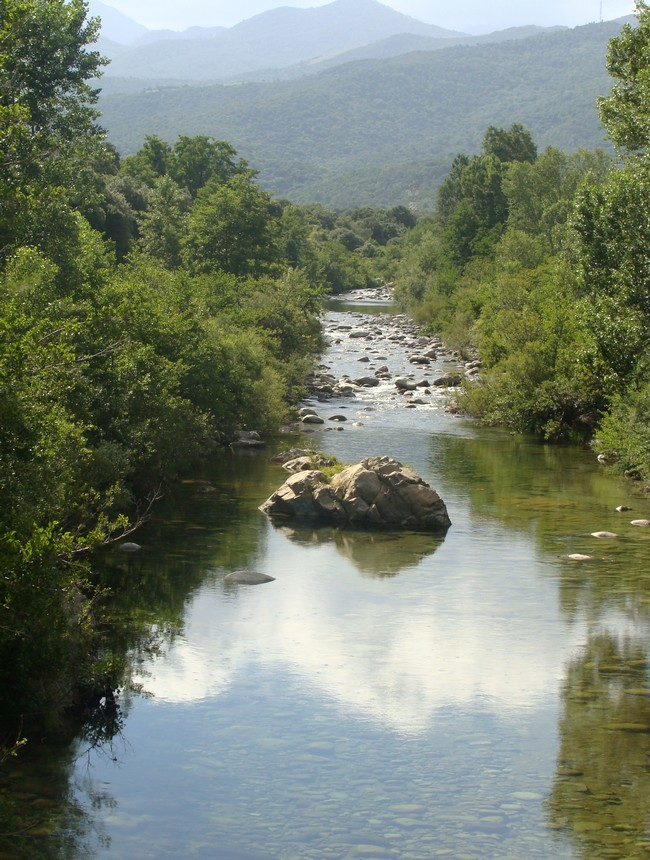
- The Travo near its mouth

- Location within Corsica Location within France
- Native name: Fleuve du Travu (French)

Location
- Country: France
- Region: Corsica
- Department: Haute-Corse

Physical characteristics
- Source
  - elevation: 1,743 metres (5,719 ft)
- Mouth: Tyrrhenian Sea
  - coordinates: 41.9041°N 9.4067°E
  - elevation: 0 metres (0 ft)
- Length: 32.41 kilometres (20.14 mi)
- Basin size: 128 square kilometres (49 sq mi)

The Travo River (French: Fleuve du Travu) is a river that crosses the Corse-du-Sud and Haute-Corse departments on the French island of Corsica. It flows through a relatively undisturbed natural environment, and its watershed has been recognized for its ecological value. The river contains deep natural swimming pools.

== Location ==
The Travo rises to the southwest of the 2,134 metres (7,001 ft) Monte Incudine in the Alcudina massif of Corse-du-Sud. It rises at an elevation of 1,743 metres (5,719 ft) in the southeast of the Zicavo commune. It flows north through Zicavo to its border with Cozzano. It then turns east, enters Haute-Corse, and flows through Chisa and then between Ventiseri and Solaro to enter the Tyrrhenian Sea just south of the Solenzara Air Base.

The river is called the "Bassu Rotondu" stream in its upper section, then "Forcinchesi" from Casamintellu to Monte Tignosu, then "Arinella" down to the border with Haute-Corse, and finally "Travo" from Chisa to its mouth at the Marina di Tovasinu.

== Hydrology ==
The river is 32.41 kilometres (20.14 mi) long. It drains an area of 128 square kilometres (49 sq mi). The river wanders through a dense riverine forest, and is joined by many tributaries. The upstream section in Zicavo, Cozzano and Chisa flows through a deep valley with many steep rock faces, rapids, waterfalls and pools. In the lower valley, where the river forms the boundary between Ventiseri and Solaro, the bed widens towards its mouth. It has an average flow of 2.6 cubic metres per second (92 cu ft/s) near its mouth. There is a significant decrease in flow during the summer, while during periods of intense rain it becomes tumultuous and floods.

== Ecology ==
95% of the watershed is covered by natural scrub and forest, while 2.7% is agricultural and 2.3% is used for other purposes. The riparian forest is in good condition and is quite dense. It is allowed to grow naturally without maintenance. The stream has not been dammed or diverted, the banks have not been stabilized and there are no hydraulic structures to affect the fish community. Water quality is good or very good depending on the measures chosen. The aquatic environment is rich in biodiversity and includes emblematic species such as Salmo macrostigma trout and eel. 79% of the drainage basin is recognized as Regional Nature Park and parts as Natura 2000, Important Bird Area and Zone naturelle d'intérêt écologique, faunistique et floristique.

== Pools ==
The Travo is a deep river with magnificent natural pools, some of which are very secluded, in the commune of Chisa. There is a large and deep natural swimming pool below the Gineparu bridge where the D645 road first crosses the river. Further up there are three consecutive large and deep pools that can be accessed from the road. There are other large pools above and below these three. Yet further upstream there is a large and deep natural swimming pool below the Bura bridge, which is about 15 metres (49 ft) above the river. It is possible to hike along the river between the Gineparu and Bura bridges.

== Tributaries ==
The following streams (ruisseaux) are tributaries of the Travo:

- Ruvoli (13 km)
  - Saltu (3 km)
    - Tassaccio (1 km)
  - Castagnolu (2 km)
  - Felcia (2 km)
- Luvana (9 km)
  - Lama (2 km)
  - Teja (2 km)
  - Ghialba (1 km)
  - Monte Malo (1 km)
  - Tafone (1 km)
- Coda Vacca (7 km)
  - Macciocu (2 km)
  - Chinesa (2 km)
- Cotulu (4 km)
- Juva (4 km)
  - Funtana (2 km)
  - Larducciu (2 km)
- Aretu (4 km)
  - Perelli (2 km)
- Guadellu (4 km)
- Cippisa (3 km)
- Allucia (3 km)
- l'Agnone (3 km)
  - l'Usciolu (1 km)
- Castellettu (3 km)
- Lori (3 km)
- Solaro (3 km)
- Acqua d'Acelli (3 km)
  - Marraciole (2 km)
- Largiaccia (2 km)
- Sena (2 km)
  - Rancichelle (2 km)
- l'Incudine (2 km)
- Arja Vallinca (2 km)
- Cavallareccia (2 km)
- Cavallare (2 km)
- Sapara Albertu (2 km)
- Meta (2 km)
- Albuccellu (2 km)
- Pargolu (2 km)
- Serra di Lucianu (2 km)
- Broncu (1 km)
- Forccia (1 km)
- Capilargu (1 km)
- Murta (1 km)
- Anculavu (1 km)
- Benedettu (1 km)

== Gallery ==
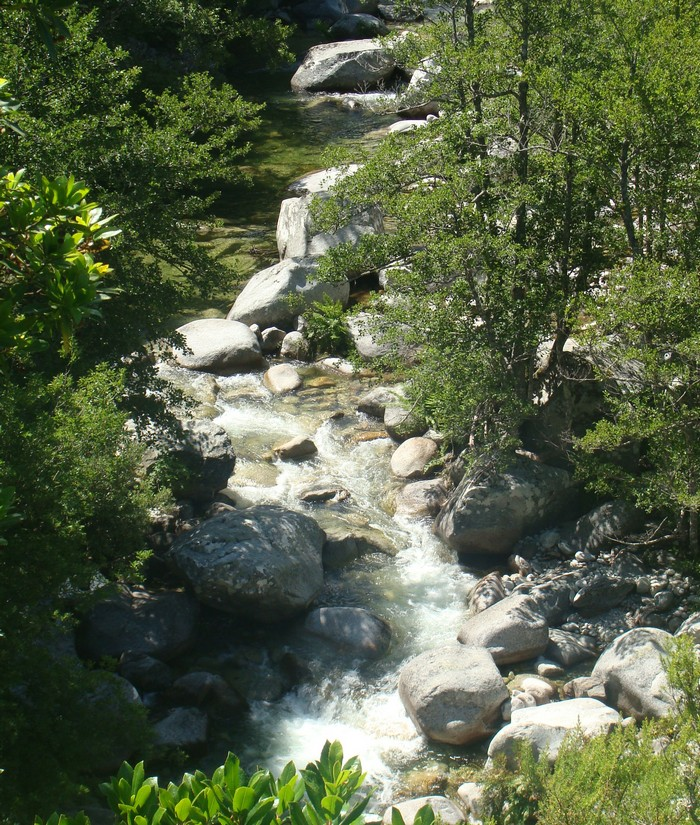
The Travo below the village of Chisa.

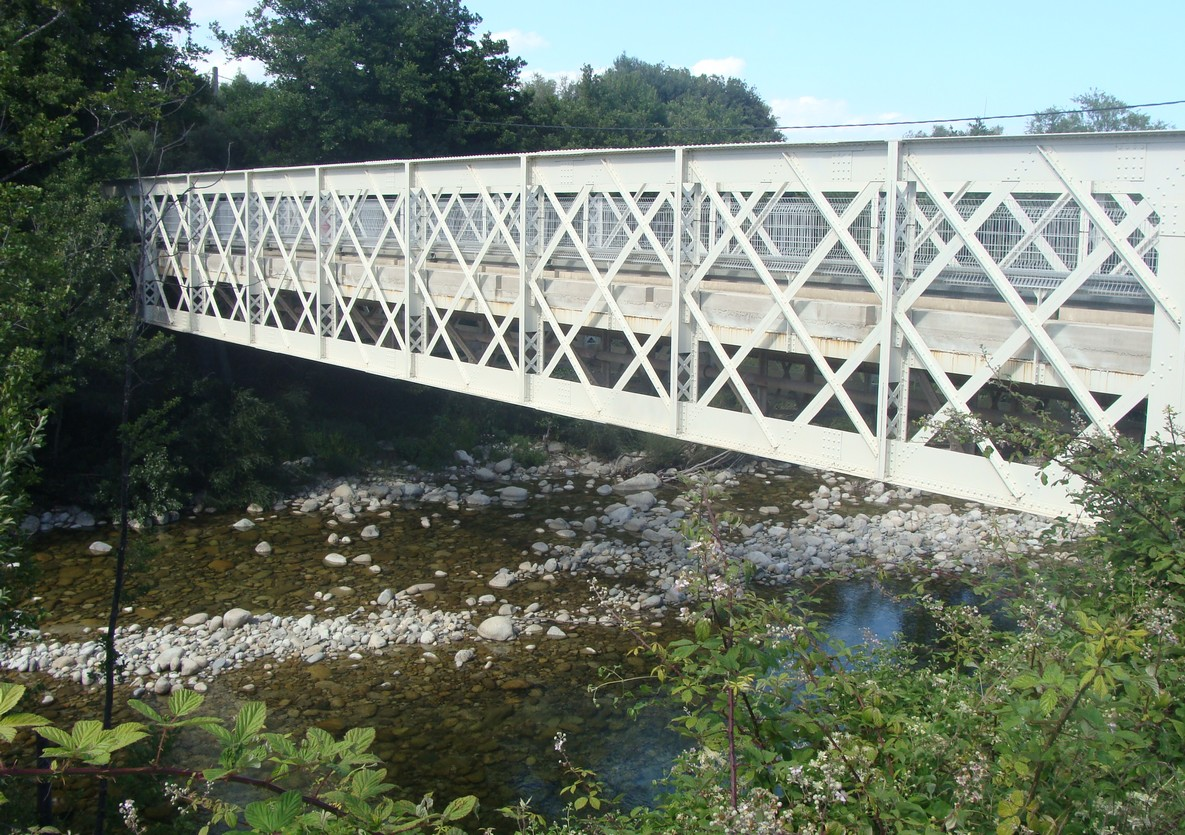
The bridge over the Travo of the old eastern coast railway line. Open to car traffic, recently renovated.

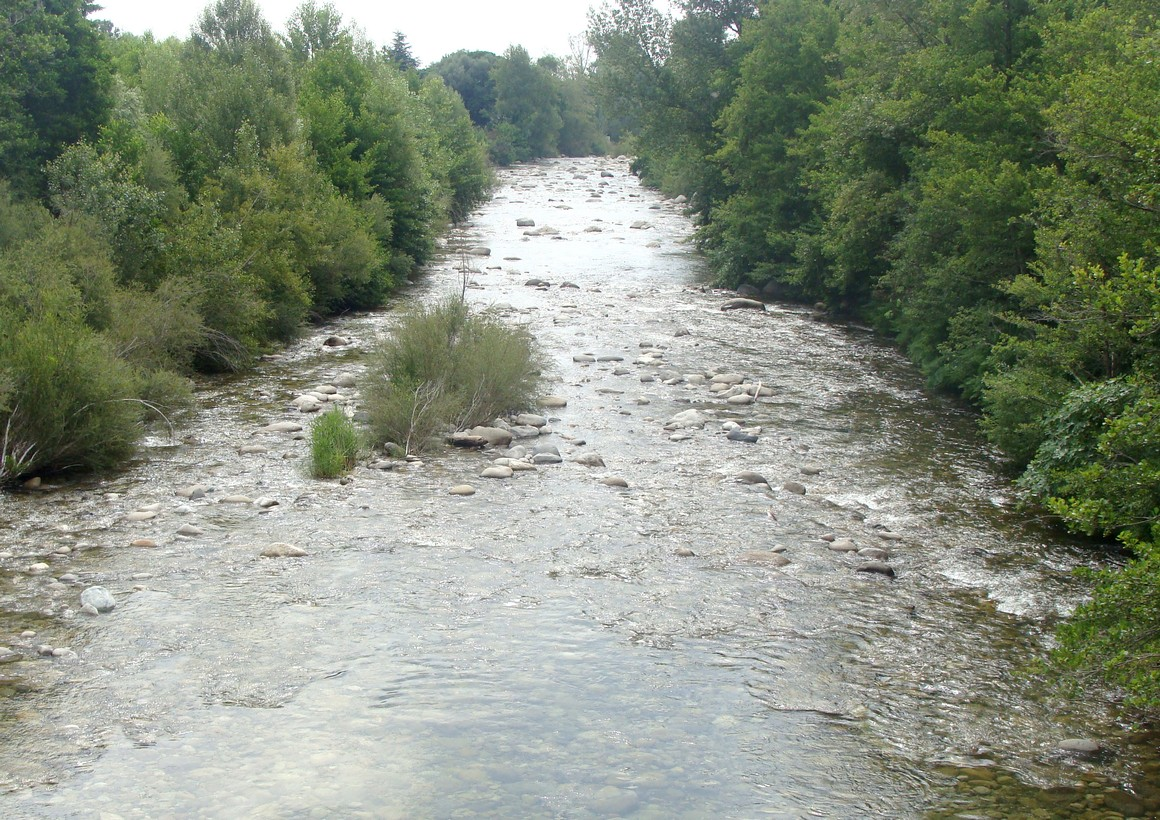
The Travo seen from the railway bridge

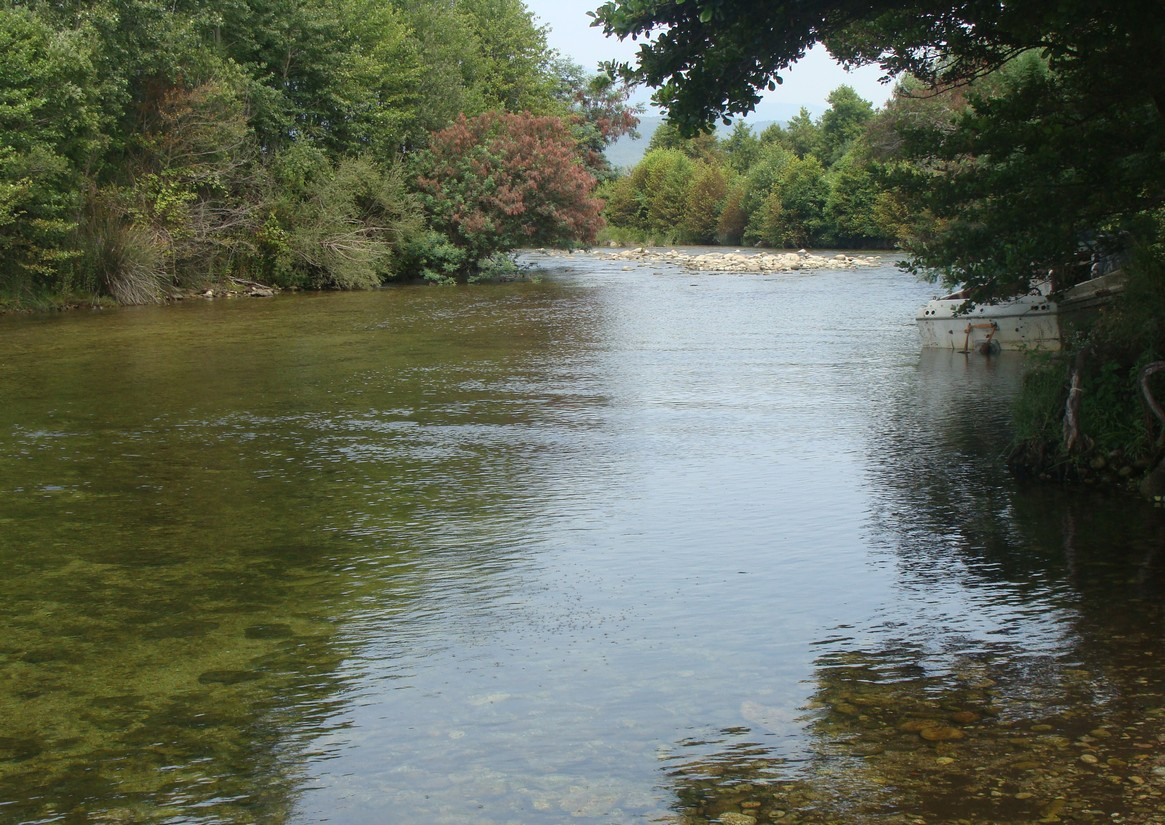
The Travo at its mouth, looking upstream

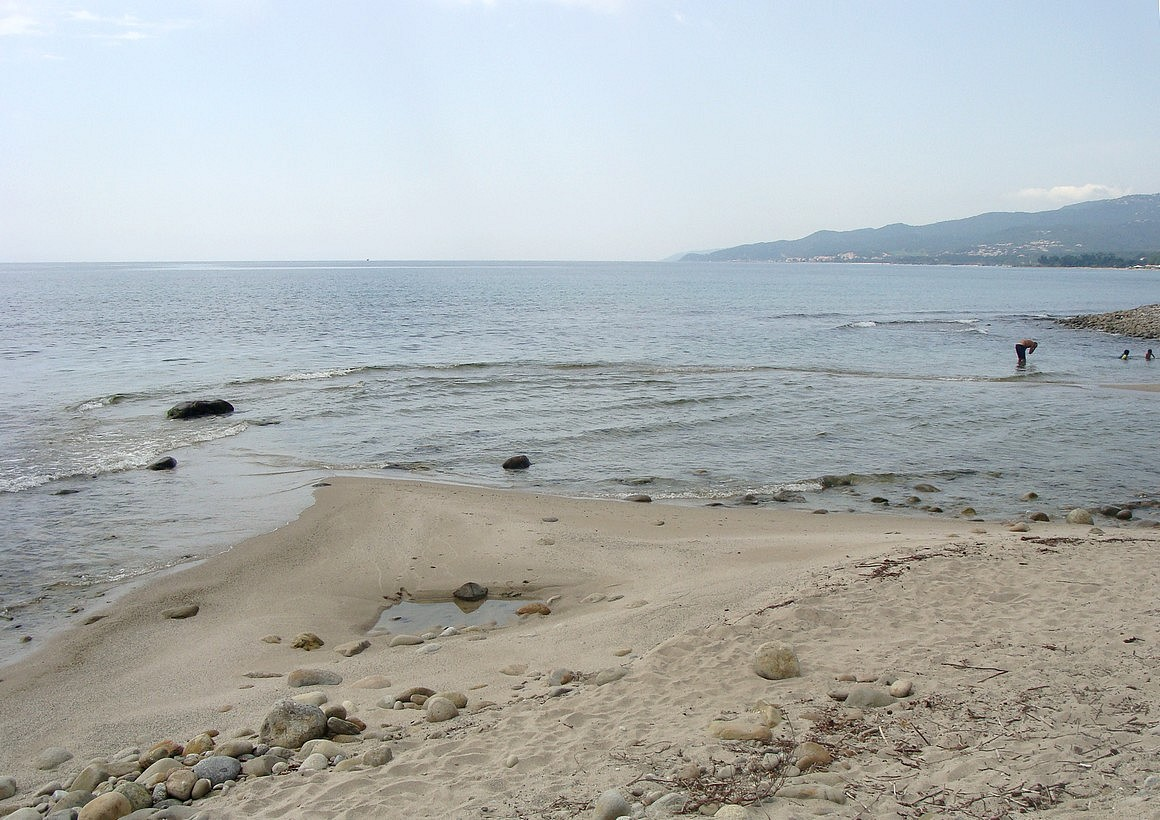
The sea at the mouth of the Travo.

== Sources ==
- Lendi, Martin, "Travo", Paradisu (in French)
- "Le Travu, de sa source à l'estuaire", Rivières Sauvages (in French), September 2018
- "Le Travo", Sandre (in French), Service d'administration nationale des données et référentiels sur l'eau
- "Relation: Le Travo (7391277)", OpenStreetMap
- "Travo", Site d'informations scientifiques, techniques et écologiques sur l' EAU (in French)
