= Georges Benedetti =

French politician (1930–2018)

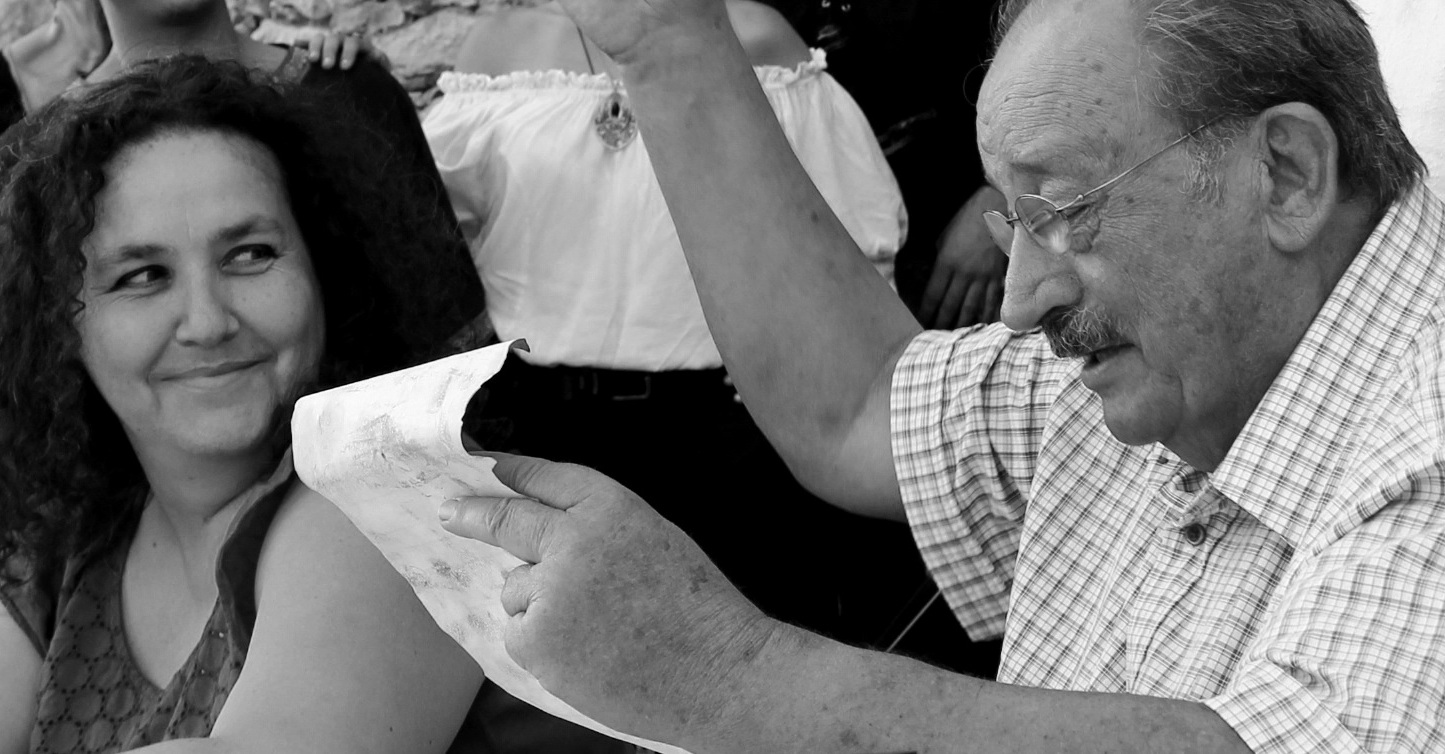
- Georges Benedetti - 20e anniversaire de l'Institut régional du cinéma et de l'audiovisuel

Parliament member from 3rd Constituency of Gard
- In office 23 June 1988 – 1 April 1993
- Preceded by: Office created
- Succeeded by: Gilbert Baumet

Senator from Gard
- In office 24 June 1986 – 24 June 1988
- Preceded by: Edgar Tailhades
- Succeeded by: Position dissolved

President of the General Council of Gard
- In office 1982–1982
- Preceded by: Gilbert Baumet
- Succeeded by: Gilbert Baumet

Member of Parliament from the 2nd Constituency of Gard
- In office 21 June 1981 – 1 April 1986
- Preceded by: Bernard Deschamps
- Succeeded by: Position dissolved

Mayor of Bagnols-sur-Cèze
- In office 1977–1989
- Preceded by: Pierre Boulot
- Succeeded by: René Cret

General Councillor of Canton de Bagnols-sur-Cèze
- In office 1976–1994
- Preceded by: Fernand Jarrié
- Succeeded by: Jean Vidal
- Parliamentary group: PS

Personal details
- Born: 29 July 1930 Antisanti, France
- Died: 19 November 2018 (aged 88) Bastia, France

Georges Benedetti (29 July 1930, Antisanti – 19 November 2018) was a French politician.

== Biography ==
Georges Benedetti was born to François Benedetti, who was the mayor of Antisanti. Georges followed in his father's political footsteps and became a Senator from Gard under the Socialist Party in 1981. He was also the mayor of Bagnols-sur-Cèze from 1976 to 1989. He was a member of the Board of Directors from the Regional Institute of Cinema and Audiovisual from 1992 until his death. He also chaired the Antisanti Research Historical Association (Ricerche Storiche of Antisanti). Benedetti was an advocate for the Corsican language, and believed that it should be learned in nursery schools across Corsica.

Benedetti died on 19 November 2018 in Bastia, Corsica. Tributes were given to him by fellow politicians René Cret, Gérard Revol, Jean-Christian Rey, and Jean-Yves Chapelet.
