= San-Gavino-di-Fiumorbo =

- Commune
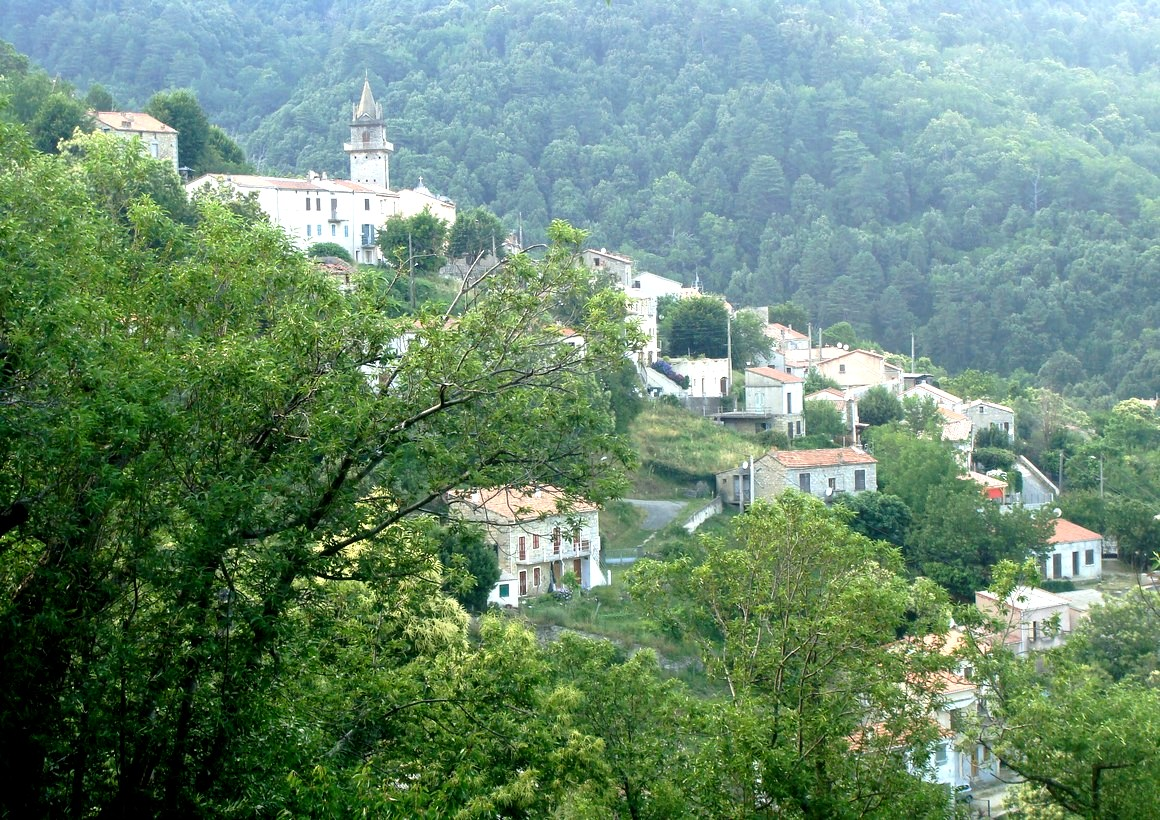
- Location of San-Gavino-di-Fiumorbo
- Location within France Location within Corsica
- Coordinates: 41°59′04″N 9°16′09″E
- Country: France
- Region: Corsica
- Department: Haute-Corse
- Arrondissement: Corte
- Canton: Fiumorbo-Castello

Government
  - Mayor (2020–2026): Philippe Vittori
- Area^{1}: 22.17 km^{2} (8.56 sq mi)
- Elevation: 460 m (1,510 ft)
- Highest elevation: 1,981 m (6,499 ft)
- Lowest elevation: 225 m (738 ft)
- Population (2023): 99
  - Density: 4.5/km^{2} (12/sq mi)
- Time zone: UTC+01:00 (CET)
  - Summer (DST): UTC+02:00 (CEST)
- INSEE/Postal code: 2B365 /20243
- ^{1} French Land Register data, which excludes lakes, ponds, glaciers > 1 km^{2} (0.386 sq mi or 247 acres) and river estuaries.

San-Gavino-di-Fiumorbo is a commune in the Haute-Corse department of France on the island of Corsica.

== Population ==
Historical population
Year	Pop.	±% p.a.
1968	301	—
1975	293	−0.38%
1982	279	−0.70%
1990	207	−3.66%
1999	209	+0.11%
2007	185	−1.51%
2012	157	−3.23%
2017	121	−5.08%
2023	99	−3.29%
Source: INSEE

== See also ==
- Communes of the Haute-Corse department
