= Solenzara Air Base =

Solenzara Air Base Base aérienne 126 Solenzara
- IATA: SOZ; ICAO: LFKS

Summary
- Airport type: Military
- Owner: Government of France
- Operator: Armée de l'air et de l'espace
- Location: Travo, France
- Elevation AMSL: 65 ft / 20 m
- Coordinates: 41°55′28″N 09°24′20″E

Map
- Location of Solenzara Air Base, France

Runways
Direction	Length		Surface
Direction	m	ft	Surface
18/36	2,627	8,619	Paved
- Source:World Aero Data

Air Base 126 Solenzara (French: Base aérienne 126 Solenzara) (IATA: SOZ, ICAO: LFKS) is a French Air and Space Force (Armée de l'air et de l'espace) (ALAE) base located in the village of Ventiseri approximately 40 km north-northeast of Porto-Vecchio on Corsica. It is just north of the mouth of the Travo River on the Tyrrhenian Sea.

Today the Air Base is a NATO tactical training center. It hosts:

- Escadron d'Hélicoptères 1/44 Solenzara with the Aérospatiale SA 330 Puma

== World War II ==
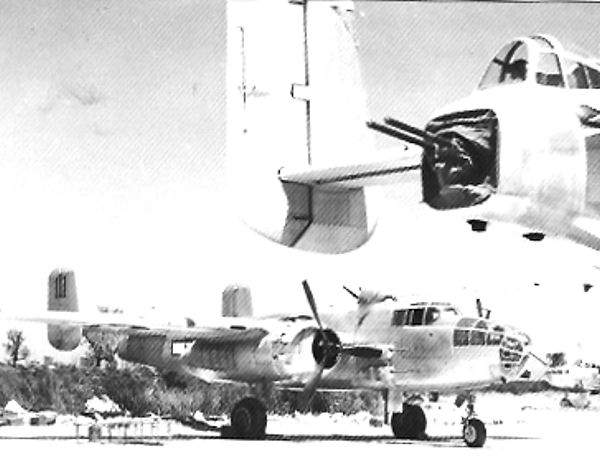
B-25J-10 43-27425, "111". 447th Bombardment Squadron, 321st Bombardment Group, Solenzara Airfield, Corsica in late 1944.

During World War II the air base was constructed by the United States Army Air Force Twelfth Air Force XII Engineer Command as an all-weather temporary field built using Pierced Steel Planking for runways and parking areas, as well as for dispersal sites. In addition, tents were used for billeting and also for support facilities; an access road was built to the existing road infrastructure; a dump for supplies, ammunition, and gasoline drums, along with a drinkable water and minimal electrical grid for communications and station lighting. As the airfield was not located on mainland France, no Advanced Landing Ground identifier was designated, and it was called Solenzara Airfield.

The airfield was designed for fighter, medium bomber units, as well as for command and control. Known units assigned were:

- HQ, 57th Bombardment Wing, 20 April-5 October 1944
- 310th Bombardment Group, 10 December 1943 – 7 April 1945, B-25 Mitchell
- 324th Fighter Group, 19 July 1944 – 25 August 1944, P-40 Warhawk

Both the 310th and 324th flew combat missions in support of the Invasion of Southern France (Operation Dragoon) during July and August 1944. At the end of the war, the American combat units moved out for their return to the United States. The airfield was then turned over to the French government in July 1945.

== Corsican conflict ==
On the night of 13 January 1978, nine armed militiamen wearing balaclavas stormed and bombed the NATO radar station at Solenzara using 40 kg of explosives, in the so-called "Operation Zara".
