= Chisa =

- Commune
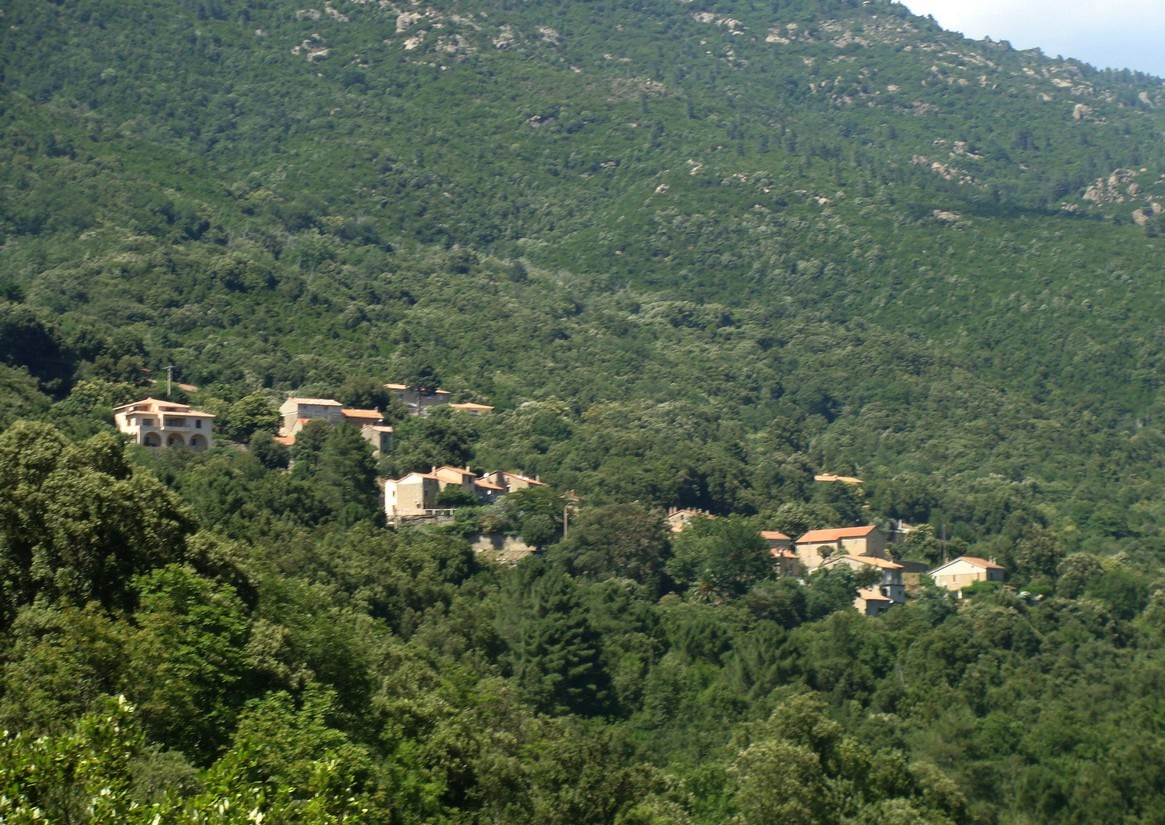
- The village of Chisa, seen from the access road near Bura
- Location of Chisa
- Location within France Location within Corsica
- Coordinates: 41°55′31″N 9°15′50″E
- Country: France
- Region: Corsica
- Department: Haute-Corse
- Arrondissement: Corte
- Canton: Fiumorbo-Castello

Government
  - Mayor (2020–2026): Michel André Galinier
- Area^{1}: 28.92 km^{2} (11.17 sq mi)
- Elevation: 450 m (1,480 ft)
- Highest elevation: 1,850 m (6,070 ft)
- Lowest elevation: 139 m (456 ft)
- Population (2023): 104
  - Density: 3.60/km^{2} (9.31/sq mi)
- Time zone: UTC+01:00 (CET)
  - Summer (DST): UTC+02:00 (CEST)
- INSEE/Postal code: 2B366 /20240
- ^{1} French Land Register data, which excludes lakes, ponds, glaciers > 1 km^{2} (0.386 sq mi or 247 acres) and river estuaries.

Chisa (French pronunciation: [kiza]; Corsican: Chisà) is a commune in the Haute-Corse department of France on the island of Corsica.

== Population ==
Historical population
Year	Pop.	±% p.a.
1968	115	—
1975	78	−5.40%
1982	56	−4.62%
1990	88	+5.81%
1999	97	+1.09%
2007	99	+0.26%
2012	98	−0.20%
2017	100	+0.40%
2023	104	+0.66%
Source: INSEE

== See also ==
- Communes of the Haute-Corse department
