= Isolaccio-di-Fiumorbo =

- Commune
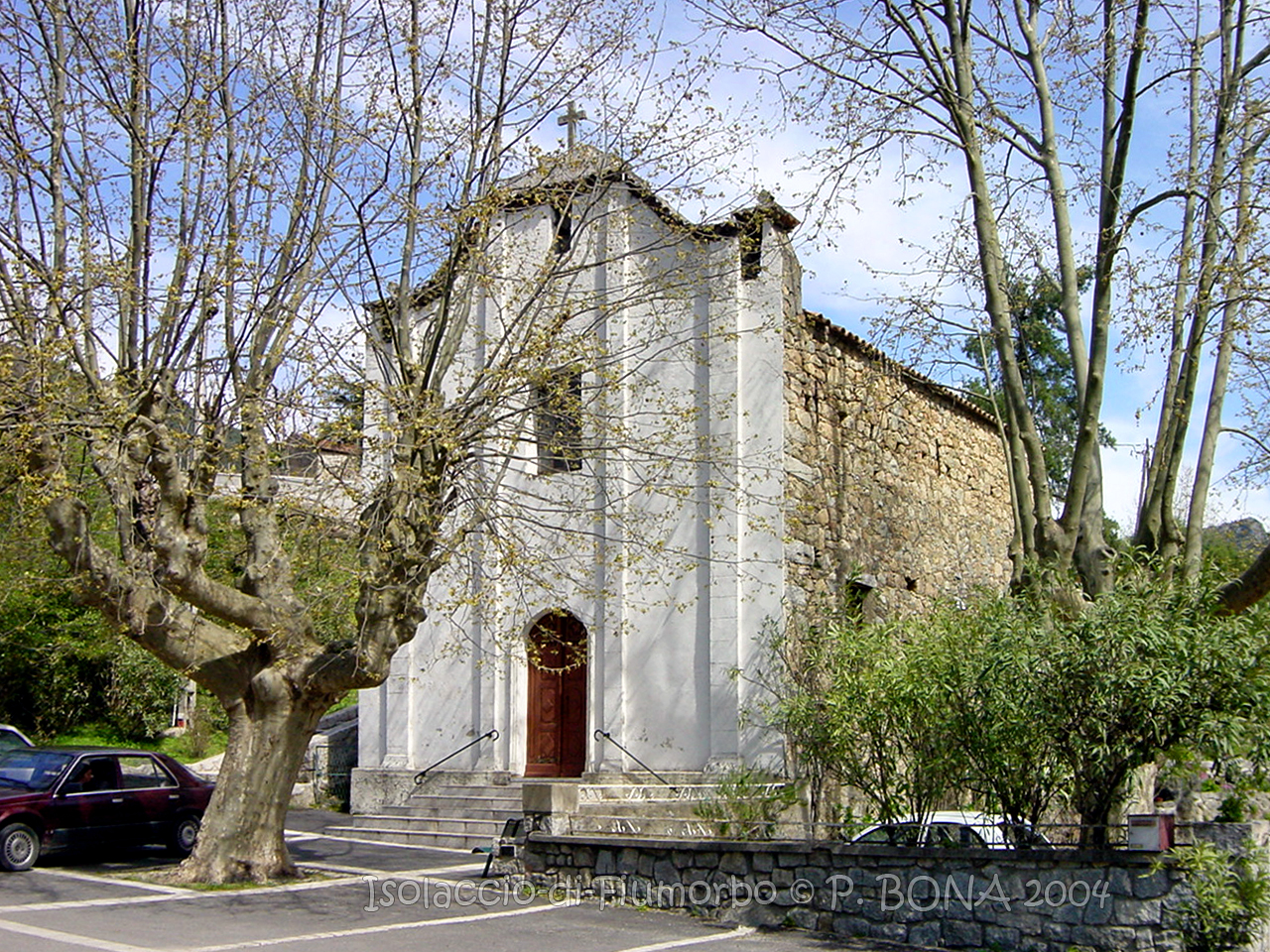
- The church of Pietrapola in Isolaccio-di-Fiumorbo
- Location of Isolaccio-di-Fiumorbo
- Location within France Location within Corsica
- Coordinates: 42°00′11″N 9°16′53″E
- Country: France
- Region: Corsica
- Department: Haute-Corse
- Arrondissement: Corte
- Canton: Fiumorbo-Castello
- Intercommunality: Fium'orbu Castellu

Government
  - Mayor (2020–2026): Jacky Bartoli
- Area^{1}: 40.89 km^{2} (15.79 sq mi)
- Elevation: 740 m (2,430 ft)
- Highest elevation: 2,036 m (6,680 ft)
- Lowest elevation: 119 m (390 ft)
- Population (2023): 330
  - Density: 8.1/km^{2} (21/sq mi)
- Time zone: UTC+01:00 (CET)
  - Summer (DST): UTC+02:00 (CEST)
- INSEE/Postal code: 2B135 /20243
- ^{1} French Land Register data, which excludes lakes, ponds, glaciers > 1 km^{2} (0.386 sq mi or 247 acres) and river estuaries.

Isolaccio-di-Fiumorbo (French pronunciation: [izɔlaksjo di fjymɔʁbo]) is a commune in the Haute-Corse department of France on the island of Corsica.

== Population ==
Historical population
Year	Pop.	±% p.a.
1968	451	—
1975	332	−4.28%
1982	411	+3.10%
1990	346	−2.13%
1999	333	−0.42%
2007	391	+2.03%
2012	361	−1.58%
2017	311	−2.94%
2023	330	+0.99%
Source: INSEE

== See also ==
- Communes of the Haute-Corse department
