= Vezzani =

- Commune
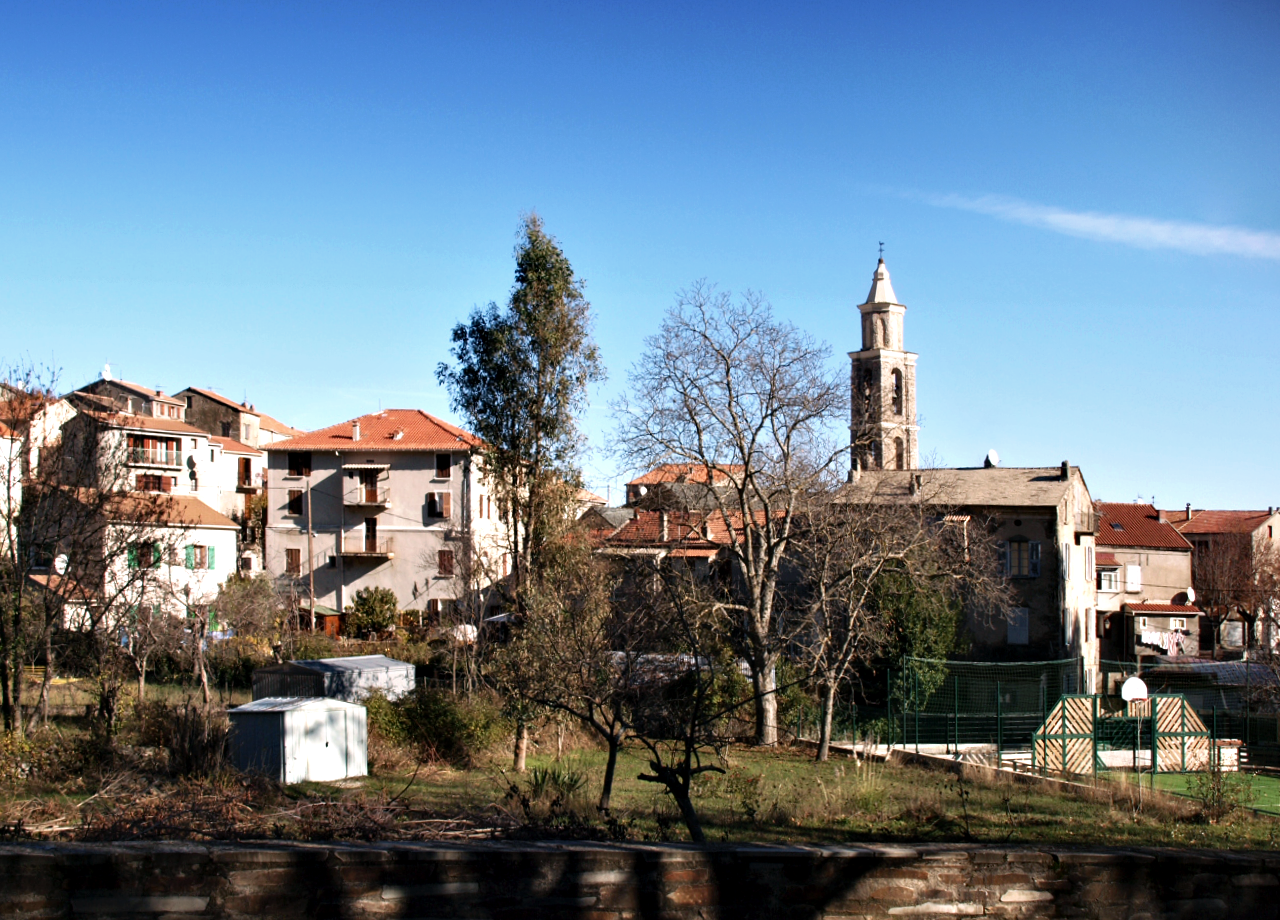
- A view of the centre of the village of Vezzani
- Location of Vezzani
- Location within France Location within Corsica
- Coordinates: 42°10′30″N 9°14′50″E
- Country: France
- Region: Corsica
- Department: Haute-Corse
- Arrondissement: Corte
- Canton: Fiumorbo-Castello
- Intercommunality: Fium'Orbu Castellu

Government
  - Mayor (2020–2026): Philippe Susini
- Area^{1}: 46.32 km^{2} (17.88 sq mi)
- Elevation: 800 m (2,600 ft)
- Highest elevation: 1,532 m (5,026 ft)
- Lowest elevation: 83 m (272 ft)
- Population (2023): 269
  - Density: 5.81/km^{2} (15.0/sq mi)
- Time zone: UTC+01:00 (CET)
  - Summer (DST): UTC+02:00 (CEST)
- INSEE/Postal code: 2B347 /20242
- ^{1} French Land Register data, which excludes lakes, ponds, glaciers > 1 km^{2} (0.386 sq mi or 247 acres) and river estuaries.

Vezzani is a commune in the Haute-Corse department of France on the island of Corsica.

== Population ==
Historical population
Year	Pop.	±% p.a.
1968	451	—
1975	408	−1.42%
1982	412	+0.14%
1990	336	−2.52%
1999	300	−1.25%
2007	307	+0.29%
2012	322	+0.96%
2017	265	−3.82%
2023	269	+0.25%
Source: INSEE

== See also ==
- Communes of the Haute-Corse department
