= Pietroso =

- Commune
- Location of Pietroso
- Location within France Location within Corsica
- Coordinates: 42°09′27″N 9°16′15″E
- Country: France
- Region: Corsica
- Department: Haute-Corse
- Arrondissement: Corte
- Canton: Fiumorbo-Castello

Government
  - Mayor (2023–2026): François Martinetti
- Area^{1}: 25.76 km^{2} (9.95 sq mi)
- Elevation: 637 m (2,090 ft)
- Highest elevation: 1,389 m (4,557 ft)
- Lowest elevation: 70 m (230 ft)
- Population (2023): 334
  - Density: 13.0/km^{2} (33.6/sq mi)
- Time zone: UTC+01:00 (CET)
  - Summer (DST): UTC+02:00 (CEST)
- INSEE/Postal code: 2B229 /20242
- ^{1} French Land Register data, which excludes lakes, ponds, glaciers > 1 km^{2} (0.386 sq mi or 247 acres) and river estuaries.

Pietroso (French pronunciation: [pjɛtʁozo]; Corsican: U Petrosu) is a commune in the Haute-Corse department of France on the island of Corsica.

== Population ==
Historical population
Year	Pop.	±% p.a.
1968	263	—
1975	271	+0.43%
1982	277	+0.31%
1990	309	+1.38%
1999	287	−0.82%
2007	262	−1.13%
2012	244	−1.41%
2017	289	+3.44%
2023	334	+2.44%
Source: INSEE

== See also ==
- Communes of the Haute-Corse department
