= Rospigliani =

- Commune
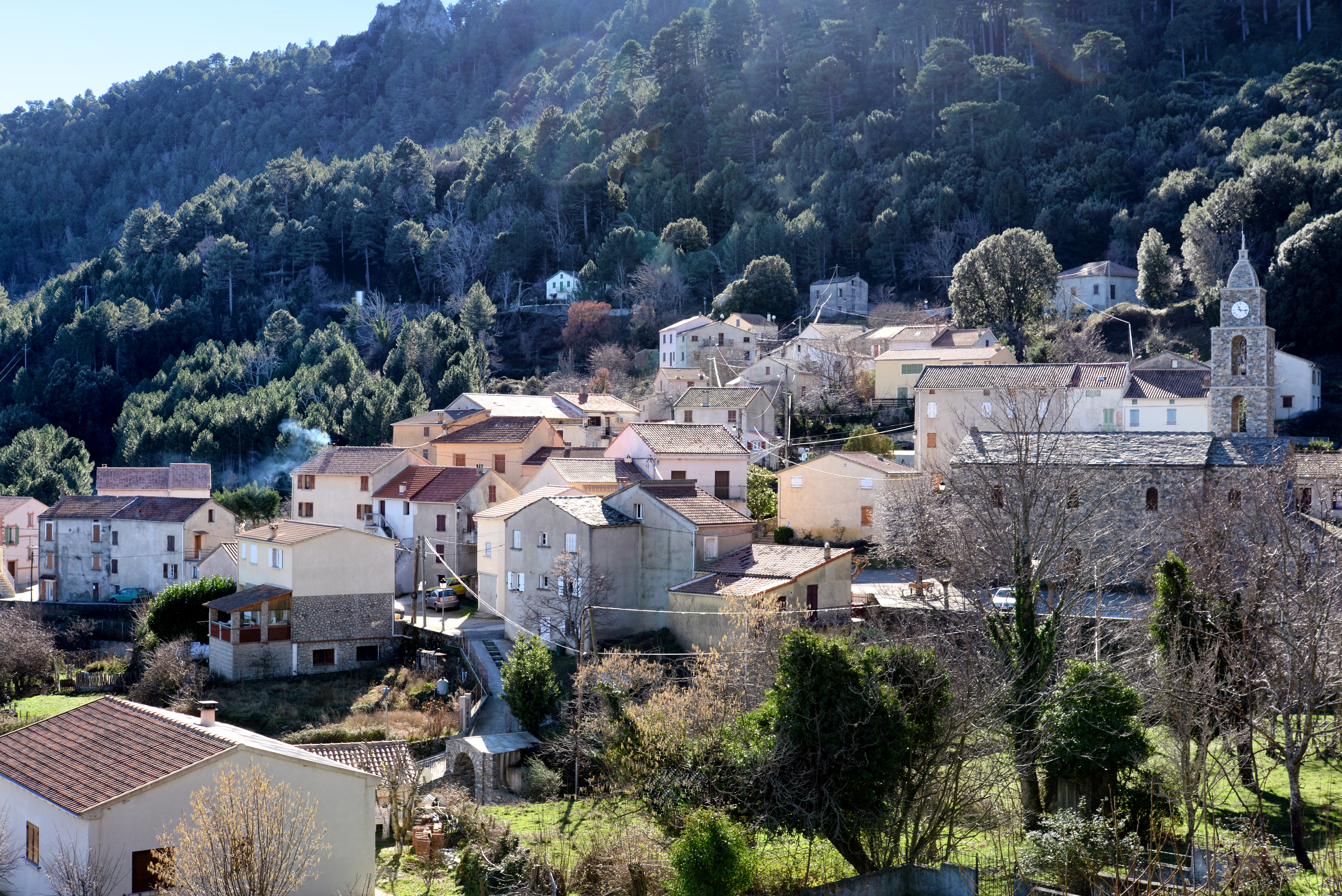
- The church and surrounding buildings in Rospigliani village
- Location of Rospigliani
- Location within France Location within Corsica
- Coordinates: 42°11′28″N 9°13′51″E
- Country: France
- Region: Corsica
- Department: Haute-Corse
- Arrondissement: Corte
- Canton: Fiumorbo-Castello

Government
  - Mayor (2020–2026): Paul Peraldi
- Area^{1}: 9.82 km^{2} (3.79 sq mi)
- Elevation: 700 m (2,300 ft)
- Highest elevation: 1,450 m (4,760 ft)
- Lowest elevation: 238 m (781 ft)
- Population (2023): 70
  - Density: 7.1/km^{2} (18/sq mi)
- Time zone: UTC+01:00 (CET)
  - Summer (DST): UTC+02:00 (CEST)
- INSEE/Postal code: 2B263 /20219
- ^{1} French Land Register data, which excludes lakes, ponds, glaciers > 1 km^{2} (0.386 sq mi or 247 acres) and river estuaries.

Rospigliani is a commune in the Haute-Corse department of France on the island of Corsica.

== Population ==
Historical population
Year	Pop.	±% p.a.
1968	121	—
1975	95	−3.40%
1982	72	−3.88%
1990	62	−1.85%
1999	78	+2.58%
2007	82	+0.63%
2012	84	+0.48%
2017	71	−3.31%
2023	70	−0.24%
Source: INSEE

== See also ==
- Communes of the Haute-Corse department
