= Ventiseri =

- Commune
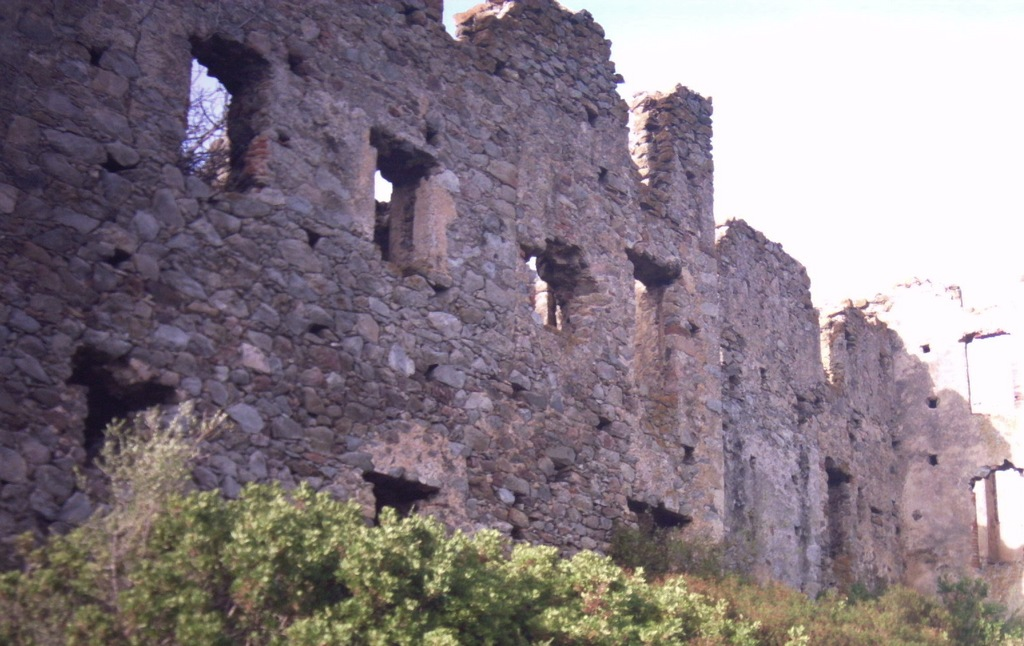
- Ruins of the fort of Coasina
- Location of Ventiseri
- Location within France Location within Corsica
- Coordinates: 41°56′36″N 9°20′00″E
- Country: France
- Region: Corsica
- Department: Haute-Corse
- Arrondissement: Corte
- Canton: Fiumorbo-Castello

Government
  - Mayor (2020–2026): François Tiberi
- Area^{1}: 46.7 km^{2} (18.0 sq mi)
- Elevation: 510 m (1,670 ft)
- Highest elevation: 1,033 m (3,389 ft)
- Lowest elevation: 0 m (0 ft)
- Population (2023): 2,629
  - Density: 56.3/km^{2} (146/sq mi)
- Time zone: UTC+01:00 (CET)
  - Summer (DST): UTC+02:00 (CEST)
- INSEE/Postal code: 2B342 /20240
- ^{1} French Land Register data, which excludes lakes, ponds, glaciers > 1 km^{2} (0.386 sq mi or 247 acres) and river estuaries.

Ventiseri is a commune in the Haute-Corse department of France on the island of Corsica.

== Geography ==
=== Climate ===
Ventiseri has a mediterranean climate (Köppen climate classification Csa). The average annual temperature in Ventiseri is 16.7 °C (62.1 °F). The average annual rainfall is 798.7 mm (31.44 in) with October as the wettest month. The temperatures are highest on average in August, at around 25.2 °C (77.4 °F), and lowest in January, at around 9.9 °C (49.8 °F). The highest temperature ever recorded in Ventiseri was 39.9 °C (103.8 °F) on 4 July 1965; the coldest temperature ever recorded was −5.9 °C (21.4 °F) on 7 March 1971.

Climate data for Solenzara, Ventiseri (1991–2020 averages, extremes 1961−present)
| Month | Jan | Feb | Mar | Apr | May | Jun | Jul | Aug | Sep | Oct | Nov | Dec | Year |
|---|---|---|---|---|---|---|---|---|---|---|---|---|---|
| Record high °C (°F) | 25.5 (77.9) | 27.6 (81.7) | 29.2 (84.6) | 28.0 (82.4) | 30.9 (87.6) | 37.1 (98.8) | 39.9 (103.8) | 37.8 (100.0) | 37.1 (98.8) | 31.3 (88.3) | 31.4 (88.5) | 23.2 (73.8) | 39.9 (103.8) |
| Mean daily maximum °C (°F) | 13.7 (56.7) | 14.1 (57.4) | 16.2 (61.2) | 18.6 (65.5) | 22.5 (72.5) | 26.6 (79.9) | 29.5 (85.1) | 29.9 (85.8) | 26.3 (79.3) | 22.1 (71.8) | 17.6 (63.7) | 14.5 (58.1) | 21.0 (69.8) |
| Daily mean °C (°F) | 9.9 (49.8) | 9.9 (49.8) | 11.9 (53.4) | 14.2 (57.6) | 17.9 (64.2) | 21.9 (71.4) | 24.8 (76.6) | 25.2 (77.4) | 21.9 (71.4) | 18.1 (64.6) | 13.9 (57.0) | 10.9 (51.6) | 16.7 (62.1) |
| Mean daily minimum °C (°F) | 6.2 (43.2) | 5.8 (42.4) | 7.7 (45.9) | 9.8 (49.6) | 13.3 (55.9) | 17.1 (62.8) | 20.1 (68.2) | 20.5 (68.9) | 17.4 (63.3) | 14.1 (57.4) | 10.3 (50.5) | 7.3 (45.1) | 12.5 (54.5) |
| Record low °C (°F) | −4.8 (23.4) | −3.9 (25.0) | −5.9 (21.4) | 0.6 (33.1) | 5.0 (41.0) | 8.3 (46.9) | 12.4 (54.3) | 12.9 (55.2) | 9.5 (49.1) | 3.9 (39.0) | −1.3 (29.7) | −2.7 (27.1) | −5.9 (21.4) |
| Average precipitation mm (inches) | 79.1 (3.11) | 64.0 (2.52) | 69.4 (2.73) | 67.0 (2.64) | 47.6 (1.87) | 21.7 (0.85) | 10.7 (0.42) | 18.9 (0.74) | 90.6 (3.57) | 119.2 (4.69) | 112.0 (4.41) | 98.5 (3.88) | 798.7 (31.44) |
| Average precipitation days (≥ 1.0 mm) | 6.6 | 6.3 | 6.7 | 6.8 | 4.6 | 2.7 | 1.7 | 1.9 | 5.1 | 7.3 | 9.2 | 8.1 | 67.0 |
| Mean monthly sunshine hours | 133.1 | 143.7 | 193.0 | 211.8 | 257.1 | 299.6 | 335.8 | 306.4 | 229.1 | 174.1 | 127.4 | 128.7 | 2,539.7 |
Source: Météo France

== Population ==
Historical population
| Year | Pop. | ±% p.a. |
|---|---|---|
| 1968 | 1,314 | — |
| 1975 | 1,280 | −0.37% |
| 1982 | 1,702 | +4.15% |
| 1990 | 2,005 | +2.07% |
| 1999 | 2,023 | +0.10% |
| 2007 | 2,216 | +1.15% |
| 2012 | 2,357 | +1.24% |
| 2017 | 2,481 | +1.03% |
| 2023 | 2,629 | +0.97% |
Source: INSEE

== See also ==
- Communes of the Haute-Corse department
