= Ampriani =

- Commune
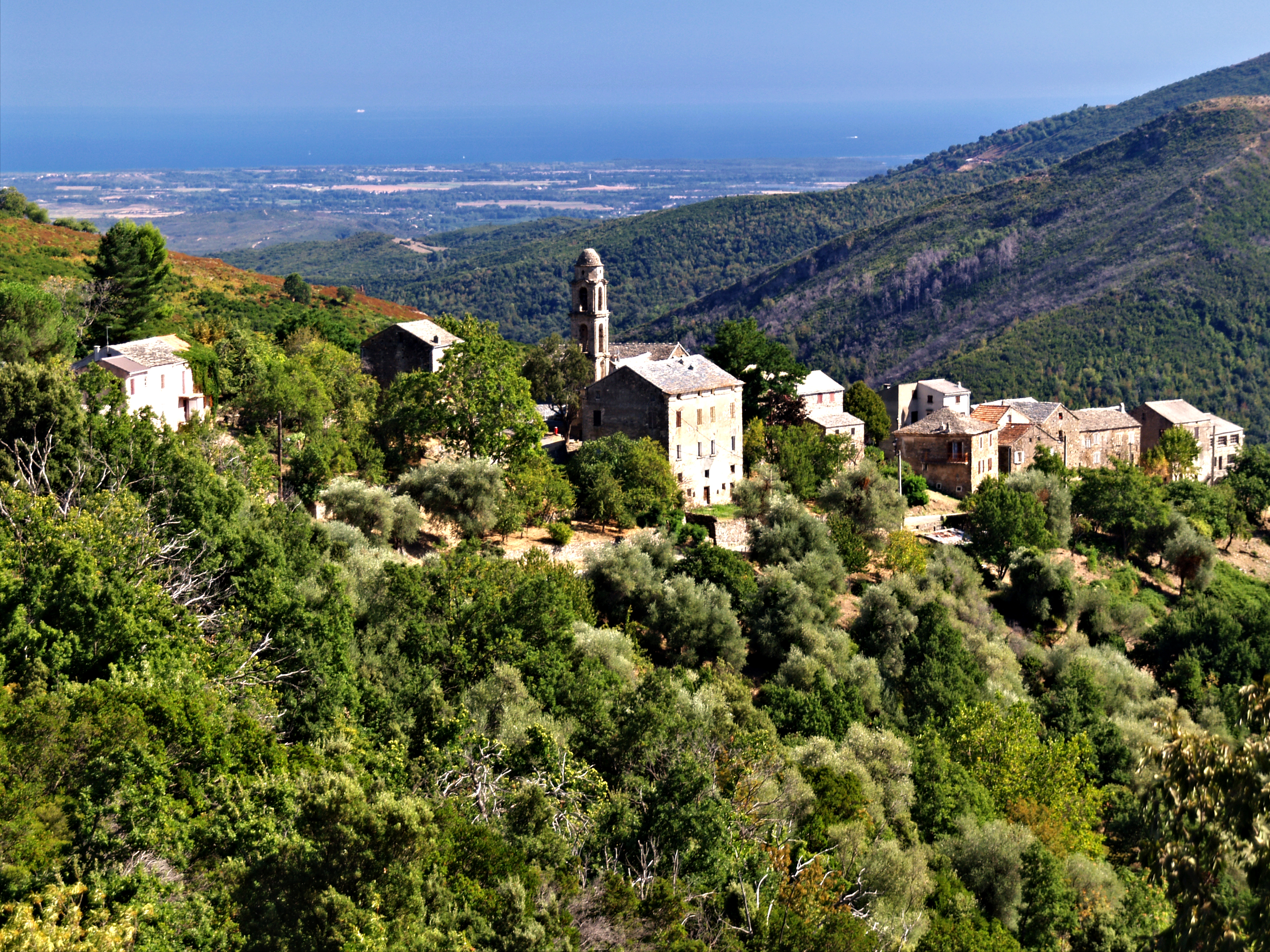
- Ampriani and the Tallone plain
- Location of Ampriani
- Location within France Location within Corsica
- Coordinates: 42°15′06″N 9°21′26″E
- Country: France
- Region: Corsica
- Department: Haute-Corse
- Arrondissement: Corte
- Canton: Ghisonaccia
- Intercommunality: Oriente

Government
  - Mayor (2020–2026): Pierre François Dompietrini
- Area^{1}: 2 km^{2} (0.77 sq mi)
- Elevation: 560 m (1,840 ft)
- Highest elevation: 749 m (2,457 ft)
- Lowest elevation: 320 m (1,050 ft)
- Population (2023): 23
  - Density: 12/km^{2} (30/sq mi)
- Time zone: UTC+01:00 (CET)
  - Summer (DST): UTC+02:00 (CEST)
- INSEE/Postal code: 2B015 /20272
- ^{1} French Land Register data, which excludes lakes, ponds, glaciers > 1 km^{2} (0.386 sq mi or 247 acres) and river estuaries.

Ampriani is a commune in the Haute-Corse department on the island of Corsica, France.

== Geography ==
Ampriani is a commune on the eastern side of Corsica in the heart of the Pieve (religious jurisdiction) in the Serra in the canton of Moita Verde. It is 30 km by road north-west from Aleria and significantly less in a direct line and 16 km south-west of Moïta in the Valley of the Cursigliese. Access is by the D116 road from Tallone in the south-east which continues north of the village north-west to Zuani. Ampriani is a small village of a single row of houses with a watchtower aligned on a ridge at an altitude of about 600 metres (lowest point 320 m, highest point: 749 m) overlooking the valley and almost the entire plain. The village is nearly deserted in winter, but has about a hundred people in summer. The road leading to the village is a dead end and ends on the old "helicopter pad". The terrain in the commune is rugged and heavily forested.

== History ==
=== Middle Ages ===
In the 16th century Ampriani was part of the Pieve di a Serra with two other villages which are in the current commune of Zuani. Around 1520 the three villages making up the Pieve were called:

- Alpriano for Ampriani;
- Cuiani for Zuani;
- La Valle di Sagano.

=== From the 18th century to today ===
Before the 18th century Ampriani was still part of the Pieve di a Serra but to the three villages in 1520 were added the villages of:

- Moitta (Moïta);
- Mattra (Matra);
- Pianello;
- Zallana (Zalana).

The three original villages, meanwhile, had become:

- Ampriani;
- Zuvani (Zuani);
- La Valle di Sagano had disappeared.

In 1790, with the French Revolution the Pieves became cantons. The Pieve di a Serra became the Canton of Serra, before taking the name Canton of Moïta in 1830.

In 1954 the communes of Aléria, Ampriani, Matra, Moïta, Pianello, Tallone, Zalana, and Zuani formed the Canton of Moïta.

Between 1971 and 1973, the two cantons of Moïta and Pietra di Verde were merged. They form the current Canton of Moita Verde.

Today the Canton of Moita Verde is composed of fourteen communes. These are the six communes in the Canton of Pietra: Canale-di-Verde, Linguizzetta, Tox, Campi, A Petra, and Chiatra (to which can be added the two hamlets of Monticchio and Ersagie, which now belong respectively to the communes of Pietra-di-Verde and Chiatra and the second to U Monte). To these are added the eight communes of the Canton of Moïta to create the Canton of Moïta-Verde.

== Administration ==
List of Successive Mayors

From	To	Name
1965	1995	Ange Michel Renucci
1995	2008	Huguette Ghilardi
2008	2026	Pierre François Dompietrini

== Demography ==
Historical population

Year	Pop.	±% p.a.
1800	88	—
1821	142	+2.30%
1846	168	+0.67%
1872	116	−1.41%
1901	111	−0.15%
1926	88	−0.92%
1946	74	−0.86%
1962	44	−3.20%
1968	34	−4.21%

Year	Pop.	±% p.a.
1975	41	+2.71%
1982	36	−1.84%
1990	31	−1.85%
1999	14	−8.45%
2007	9	−5.37%
2012	13	+7.63%
2017	24	+13.05%
2023	23	−0.71%

Source: EHESS and INSEE

== Sites and Monuments ==
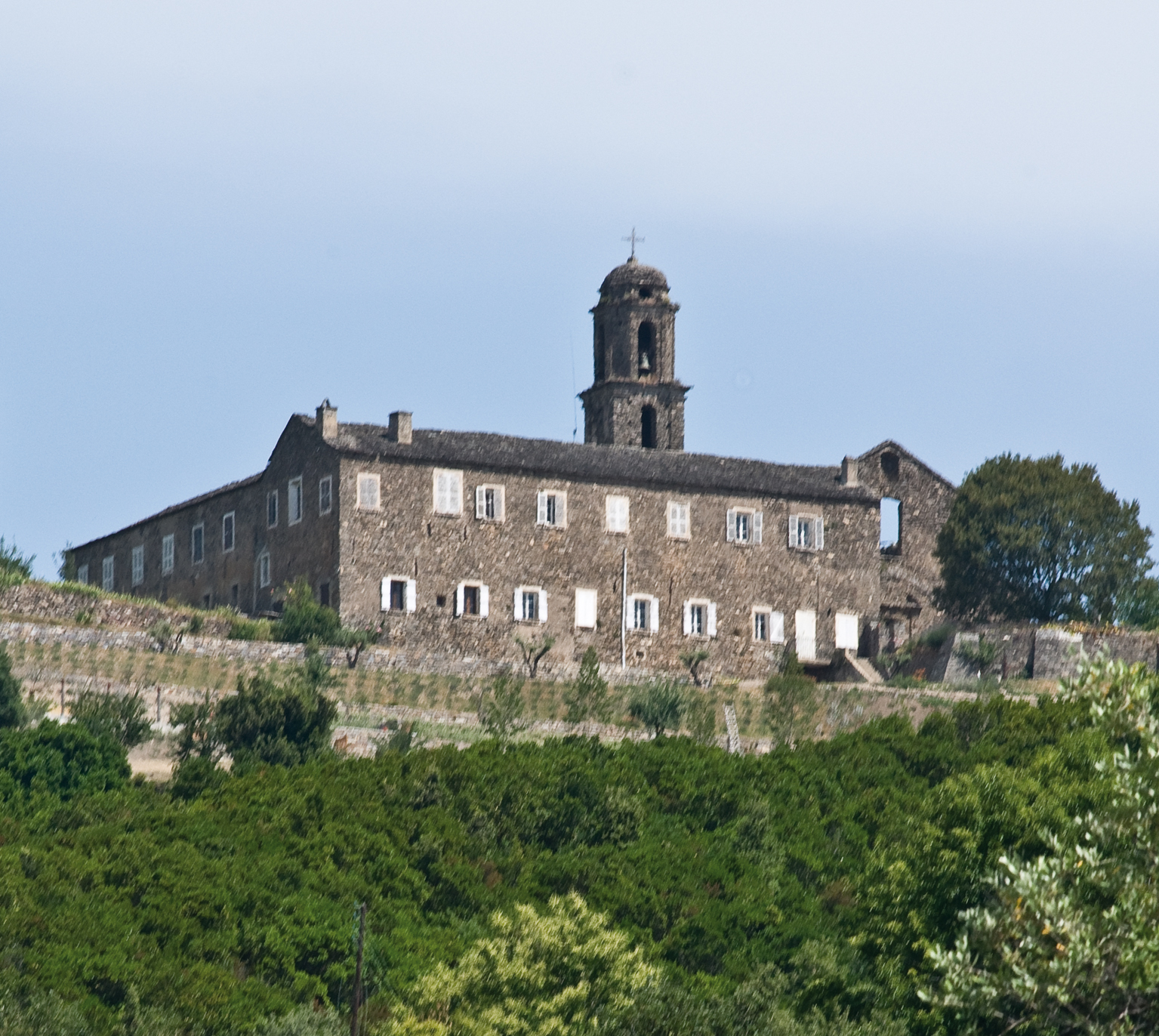
The Zuani Convent

- The Convent of Saint Francis of Zuani (1730) is registered as an historical monument.

== See also ==
- Communes of the Haute-Corse department
