= Aléria =

Aléria Aleria (Corsican)
- Commune
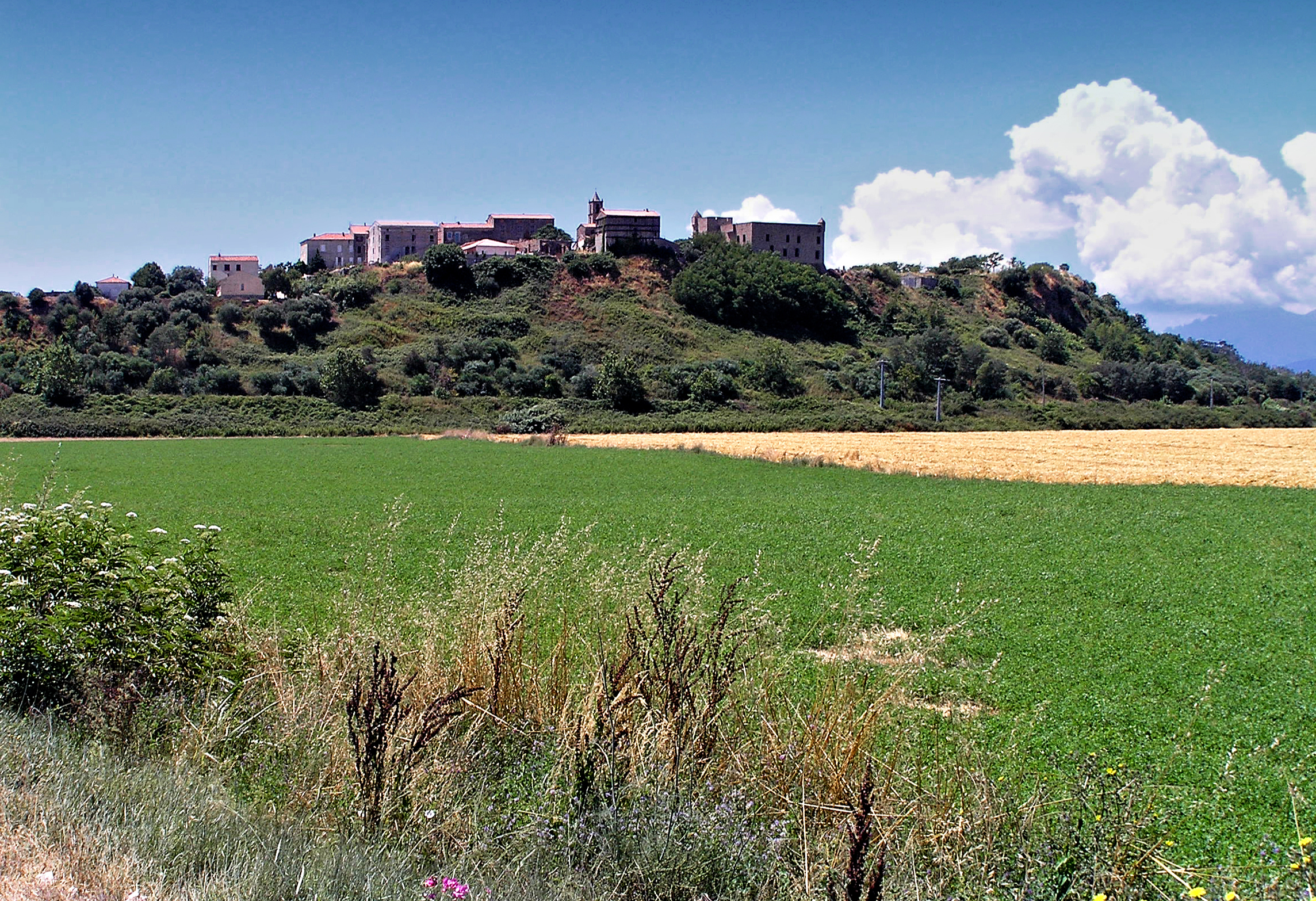
- View of Aléria
- Location of Aléria
- Location within France Location within Corsica
- Coordinates: 42°06′13″N 9°30′46″E
- Country: France
- Region: Corsica
- Department: Haute-Corse
- Arrondissement: Corte
- Canton: Ghisonaccia
- Intercommunality: Oriente

Government
  - Mayor (2024–2026): Jean Claude Franceschi
- Area^{1}: 58.33 km^{2} (22.52 sq mi)
- Elevation: 10 m (33 ft)
- Highest elevation: 102 m (335 ft)
- Lowest elevation: 0 m (0 ft)
- Population (2023): 2,267
  - Density: 38.87/km^{2} (100.7/sq mi)
- Time zone: UTC+01:00 (CET)
  - Summer (DST): UTC+02:00 (CEST)
- INSEE/Postal code: 2B009 /20270
- ^{1} French Land Register data, which excludes lakes, ponds, glaciers > 1 km^{2} (0.386 sq mi or 247 acres) and river estuaries.

Aléria (French pronunciation: [aleʁja]; Ancient Greek: Ἀλαλίη/Ἀλλαλία, Alalíē/Allalía; Latin and Italian: Aleria; Corsican: U Cateraghju) is a commune in the Haute-Corse department of France on the island of Corsica, former bishopric and present Latin Catholic titular see. It includes the easternmost point in Metropolitan France.

== Administration ==
Aléria shares the canton of Moïta-Verde with 13 other communes: Moïta, Ampriani, Campi, Canale-di-Verde, Chiatra, Linguizzetta, Matra, Pianello, Pietra-di-Verde, Tallone, Tox, Zalana and Zuani.

== Geography ==
Aléria is 70 km (43 mi) to the south of Bastia on Route N198, in the centre of the Plaine Orientale, also called the Plaine d'Aléria, the east-central coastal plain of the island facing Italy. It includes a number of villages and monuments. Most of the rest of the island is precipitously mountainous.

The eastern coastline is punctuated by a number of lakes connecting (but not always) to the Tyrrhenian Sea, the remnant of an ancient system of lagoons behind barrier beaches. The Corsicans refer to them under the name of Étang, "pool", although most are larger by far than an English pool. Marshland is also extensive on the coast requiring that cities be built inland from it. Malaria has historically been a problem near the marshlands and swamps of eastern Corsica. The fine barrier beaches are a recreational attraction.

The Tavignano River (Tavignanu) enters the commune to the northwest and exits into the Tyrrhenian Sea. Its lands include a delta, marshes to the south and the unconnected Étang de Diane to the north. To the west, the étang de Terre Rosse is a lake and reservoir used to irrigate the plain.

=== Background ===
Corsica had an indigenous population in the Neolithic and the Bronze Age but the east coast was subject to colonization by Mediterranean maritime powers: Greeks, Etruscans, Carthaginians, Romans. They typically built on an étang, which they used as a harbor. Alalíē (Ionic dialect) was placed between the southern end of the 3.5 km (2.2 mi) long Ētang de Diane and the Tavignano River (the classical Rhotanos), slightly inland, but controlling the entire district including the mouth of the river. The site is partly occupied today by the village of Cateraggio (Corsican: U Cateraghju) at the crossroads of national routes N200 and N198. N200 follows the Vallé du Tavignano into the interior mountains of Corte.

When the Etruscans took the district, after its abandonment by the Greeks, they settled further south along N198 in the vicinity of the village of Aléria, today primarily an archaeological site across the river from Cateraggio, where visitors and academics are quartered. Still south of there was the Etruscan necropolis, in today's Casabianda. Aléria takes its name from the Roman town placed there after the defeat of the Etruscans.

The entire district, however, is wider still, following the Corsican custom of including some mountains and some beaches in every district. It incorporates the agricultural lands of Teppe Rosse (to the west), the entire Étang de Diane and the Plage de Padulone 3 km (2 mi) east of Cateraggio, a former barrier beach. Since 1975 a series of laws have created the Casabianda-Aléria Nature Preserve, 1,748 ha (4,320 acres) between the mouth of the Tavignanu and the Étang d'Urbinu, which is 5 km (3 mi) to the south.

The reserve to the south was initiated from the grounds of the former penitentiary of Casabianda in 1951. It was instituted in 1880 in a then pestilential area which it was hoped the prisoners could farm. It contained 1800 ha and 214 plots. Due to a high death rate from malaria, the agricultural experiment failed.

== History ==
=== Pre-Roman ===
According to Herodotus twenty years before the abandonment of Phocaea in Ionia, that is, in 566 BC, Phocaeans colonizing the western Mediterranean founded a city, Alalíē, on the island of Cyrnus (Corsica). Diodorus Siculus says that the city was named Calaris, possibly a corruption of Alalíē. The historical circumstances of Calaris leave no doubt that it was Aleria.

Diodorus says that Aleria had a "beautiful large harbor, called Syracusium," that Calaris and another city, Nicaea, were on it, and that Nicaea had been built by the Etruscans. Syracusium can only be the Étang de Diane, a lake exiting to the Tyrrhenian Sea. As Aleria and Nicaea were trade rivals it seems unlikely that the Etruscans would have allowed the Phocaeans, who were ancient Greeks, access to Étang de Diane. Nicaea is generally identified with the La Marana district further north, where the Romans later built a city, Mariana, on the Étang de Biguglia, a better harbor. Diodorus says that the cities of Corsica were subject to the Phocaeans and that the latter took slaves, resin, wax and honey from them. Alalíē was then an emporium. Of the natives whom the Phocaeans subjugated, Diodorus says only that they were "barbarians, whose language is very strange and difficult to understand" and that they numbered more than 30,000.

At home Phocaea was the first city of Ionia to come under siege by the army of Cyrus, who were Medes commanded by Harpagus, in 546 BC. Requesting a cease-fire the Phocaeans took to their ships, abandoning the city to Harpagus, who allowed them to escape. Refused permission to settle Oenussae in the territory of Chios they resolved to reinforce Alalíē, but first made a surprise punitive raid on Phocaea, executing the entire Persian garrison. At this success half the Phocaeans reinhabited Phocaea; the other half settled in the vicinity of Alalíē.

In Corsica they were so troublesome to the Etruscans and to the Carthaginians of Sardinia that the two powers sent a combined fleet of 120 ships to root them out, but this force was defeated by 60 Phocaean ships at the Battle of Alalia in the Sardinian Sea, which Herodotus describes as a Cadmeian victory (his equivalent of a Pyrrhic victory) because the Greeks lost 40 ships sunk and the remaining 20 so damaged as not to be battle-worthy. Now unable to defend themselves, the Phocaeans took to their remaining ships and sailed off to Rhegium, abandoning Alalíē. The Etruscans landed the numerous Phocaean prisoners and executed them by stoning, leaving the bodies where they lay until the oracle compelled a proper burial. As the Carthaginians were not then interested in Corsica, the Etruscans occupied Alalíē and took over dominion of the island, which they held until the Romans took it from them.

=== Roman ===
The Etruscans and perhaps others in their turn occupied Alalia. There is no evidence of any other impact of theirs on the island or the indigenous population; the east coast location was simply fortuitous for them. Across the waters, however, rose a power that eventually dominated the entire island and had a lasting impact, changing the language. Alalíē was occupied by the Romans during the First Punic War in 259 BC. Florus says that Lucius Cornelius Scipio destroyed it and cleared the region of Carthaginians while Pliny adds that Sulla much later placed two colonies, Aleria and Mariana. Evidently the Corsican Etruscans had still been cooperating with the Carthaginians. Not including them, the island was divided into 32 states.

The Etruscans continued to use the necropolis. Subsequently, the Etruscan population must have assimilated to a new Roman population in parallel with the assimilation of Etruscans on the mainland. The Etruscan language disappeared and it must have been starting from that time that the island began to acquire its Latin language.

Under the late Roman Republic the Romans decided to build a major naval base on the shores of Étang de Diane. Starting in 80 BC under Sulla as dictator they rebuilt the city on the promontory at Aléria, naming it Aleria. The city rose to prominence under Augustus, becoming the provincial capital of Corsica. Major fleets were stationed on the étang. Ptolemy mentions it but says little about it, only mentioning "Aleria Colonia", the Rotanus River and Diana Harbor. He lists the "native races" inhabiting the island, but their geographical coordinates do not match those of Aleria; perhaps the Roman town was not considered among them.

In the later Roman Empire, the port and the city declined. It never recovered from a disastrous fire of 410 AD and in 465 was sacked by the Vandals. Subsequently, it became a small village of no interest to any major power. These events must mark the end of its classical antiquity. It was buried bit by bit by the Tavignano and the Tagnone rivers, which also created the deadly marshes. The region became subsumed under a Christian parish.

=== Medieval and modern ===
In the 13th century, Aleria became of interest to the Republic of Genoa. By that time the Latin language was gone, but it had developed into Corsu on Corsica, in parallel with the development of other Romance languages.

The commune of Aléria was created in 1824, but it did not truly begin to revive until after 1945, after the allies (chiefly American) had undertaken to eradicate malaria (1944). An organization, SOMIVAC (Société d'aménagement pour la mise en valeur de la Corse) was created in 1957 to resurrect agriculturally the entire eastern plain under government sponsorship. It had great success in developing the region. A massive archaeological effort got underway in 1955.

=== Ecclesiastical ===
There is some evidence that Corsica was being converted to Christianity in the late 6th century. Pope Gregory the Great wrote in 597 to Bishop Peter of Alaria to recover lapsed converts and to convert more pagans from the worship of trees and stones. He sent him money for baptismal robes. In 601, however, Aleria was without a bishop (see under Ajaccio).

Aleria was a residential diocese, suffragan of the Metropolitan Archdiocese of Pisa, which became a dogal state in Italy. It counted among its bishops Saint Alexander Sauli. On 29 November 1801, in accordance with the Napoleontic Concordat of 1801, it was suppressed as the territory of the diocese of Ajaccio was extended to the whole of Corsica. At the end of the Ancien Régime, the bishop no longer lived in Aléria, but in Cervione.

== Archaeology ==
Hundreds of archaeological sites on Corsica offer a view of an island that has been occupied continuously since about 6500 BC and has never been isolated. It was common for populations on Corsica to maintain contacts (especially trade contacts) with other communities on the Mediterranean; the indigenous people of Corsica therefore might have come from anywhere on the Mediterranean. The various archaeological museums on the island preserve ample remains from the Neolithic, Chalcolithic, Bronze Age and Iron Age, with some interpretive or circumstantial variation in the dates. Only in the Iron Age (700 BC-) were there any historians to distinguish between the indigenes descending from previous populations and the more recent colonists.

Although no settlements of urban density preceded the first Greek colony, Aléria is unlikely to have been altogether unpopulated. A chance find of an ancient rubbish disposal pit at a location called Terrina about 2 kilometres (1.2 mi) from the Étang de Diane gives some information regarding pre-Roman habitation. The pit was excavated between 1975 and 1981 by G. Camps, who found four levels and named the site after the most important, Terrina IV. Terrina IV features a Middle Neolithic settlement in which the use of cattle and pigs were, in contrast to the rest of the island, which kept mainly goats and sheep and grew grain. The Chalcolithic, approximately 3500–3000 BC, arrived by easy transition. The population of the site manufactured arsenical copper and copper goods.

The visible antique habitations at Aléria date to the Iron Age and are consistent with the common history. Although ruins on the promontory were noted by Prosper Mérimée in 1839, they were only excavated in 1955 by Jean Jehasse and Jean-Paul Boucher. By 1958 the excavators had uncovered the forum of the Roman city of Aleria, first occupied in the 1st century BC.

A pre-Roman, Etruscan necropolis was then discovered 500 metres (1,600 ft) to the south (in Casabianda) containing more than 200 tombs. It was excavated between 1960 and 1981. The necropolis had been in use mainly from the 6th to the 3rd centuries BC and was abandoned altogether with the construction of the Roman city, which had a cemetery to the north.

Systematic excavation since 1955 has revealed wide-ranging contacts in the 6th century BC, through pottery shards in test pits, with Ionian, Phocaean, Rhodian and Attic black-figure ware. The excavated necropolis of Casabianda's rock-cut tombs have revealed treasures and goods, left or placed with the buried, that include fine works of art, jewels, weapons, metalware, bronze and ceramic plates and dishes in particular, rhytons, distinctive kraters decorated by some of the first rank Attic vase-painters.

Portable antiquities found in the Aléria commune are presented for public viewing in the Musée Jérôme Carcopino in Fort Matra in the village of Aléria.

== Population ==
Historical population
Year	Pop.	±% p.a.
1968	1,913	—
1975	2,885	+6.04%
1982	2,410	−2.54%
1990	2,022	−2.17%
1999	1,966	−0.31%
2007	2,007	+0.26%
2012	2,191	+1.77%
2017	2,162	−0.27%
2023	2,267	+0.79%
Source: INSEE

== Economy ==
L'étang de Diane occupies 600 hectares (1,500 acres); in it, the île des Pêcheurs ("Fishermans' Island") features a large mound of oyster shells accumulated from Roman times, when removed from their shells, salted oysters were exported to Rome. A company has revived with success the production of molluscs in the étang. In the commune, grapes and citrus fruits are commonly grown.

== See also ==
- Battle of Alalia (530–535 BC)
- History of Corsica
- Mediæval Corsica
- Torra di Diana

== Bibliography ==
- Stillwell, Richard, ed. (1976). "Alalia, later Aleria, Corsica, France". Princeton Encyclopedia of Classical Sites.
- Abram, David; Geoffrey Young; Theo Taylor; Nia Williams (2003). The Rough Guide to Corsica. Rough Guides. pp. 300–304. ISBN 1-84353-047-3.
