= Moïta =

Moïta Moita
- Commune
- Location of Moïta
- Location within France Location within Corsica
- Coordinates: 42°16′40″N 9°24′50″E
- Country: France
- Region: Corsica
- Department: Haute-Corse
- Arrondissement: Corte
- Canton: Ghisonaccia

Government
  - Mayor (2020–2026): François Dominique Gozzi
- Area^{1}: 6 km^{2} (2.3 sq mi)
- Elevation: 560 m (1,840 ft)
- Highest elevation: 1,160 m (3,810 ft)
- Lowest elevation: 220 m (720 ft)
- Population (2023): 59
  - Density: 9.8/km^{2} (25/sq mi)
- Time zone: UTC+01:00 (CET)
  - Summer (DST): UTC+02:00 (CEST)
- INSEE/Postal code: 2B161 /20270
- ^{1} French Land Register data, which excludes lakes, ponds, glaciers > 1 km^{2} (0.386 sq mi or 247 acres) and river estuaries.

Moïta (French pronunciation: [mɔjta]; Italian: Moita [ˈmɔːita]; Corsican: Mòita) is a commune in the Haute-Corse department, on the island of Corsica, France.

== Administration ==
Moïta was the seat of the former canton of Moïta-Verde, which included 13 other communes: Aléria, Ampriani, Campi, Canale-di-Verde, Chiatra, Linguizzetta, Matra, Pianello, Pietra-di-Verde, Tallone, Tox, Zalana and Zuani. Since 2015, it is part of the canton of Ghisonaccia.

== Geography ==
Moïta is 74 kilometres (46 mi) to the south of Bastia and 20 kilometres (12 mi) from the sea. It was part of the ancient parish of Serra. Its territory is split between mountain and plain.

== Population ==
Historical population
Year	Pop.	±% p.a.
1968	231	—
1975	200	−2.04%
1982	164	−2.80%
1990	121	−3.73%
1999	76	−5.04%
2007	79	+0.49%
2012	81	+0.50%
2017	75	−1.53%
2023	59	−3.92%
Source: INSEE

== See also ==
- Communes of the Haute-Corse department
