= Bravone =

River in the department of Haute-Corse, Corsica

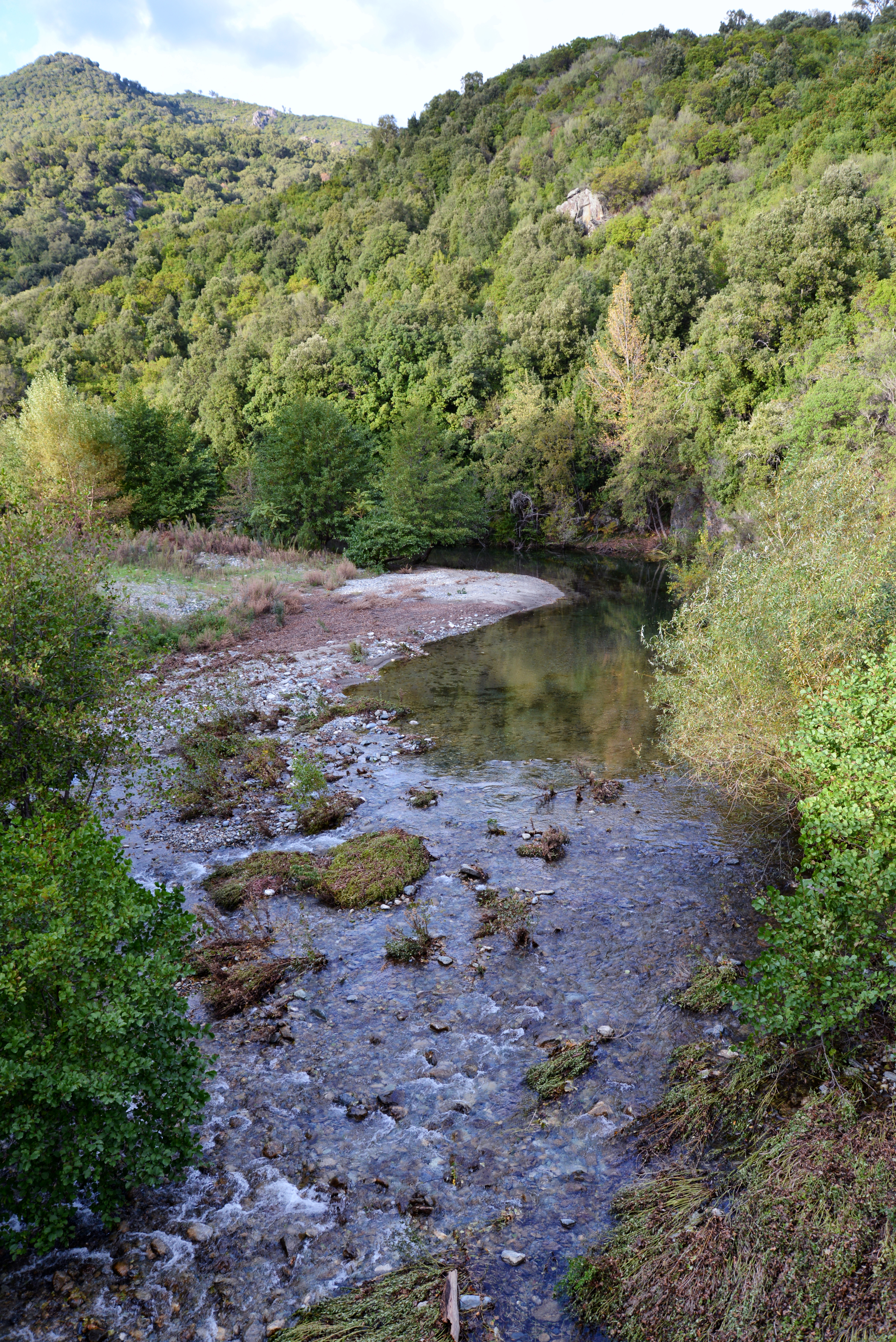
- Bravone at the old Granajo mill, upstream of the RD 16 bridge

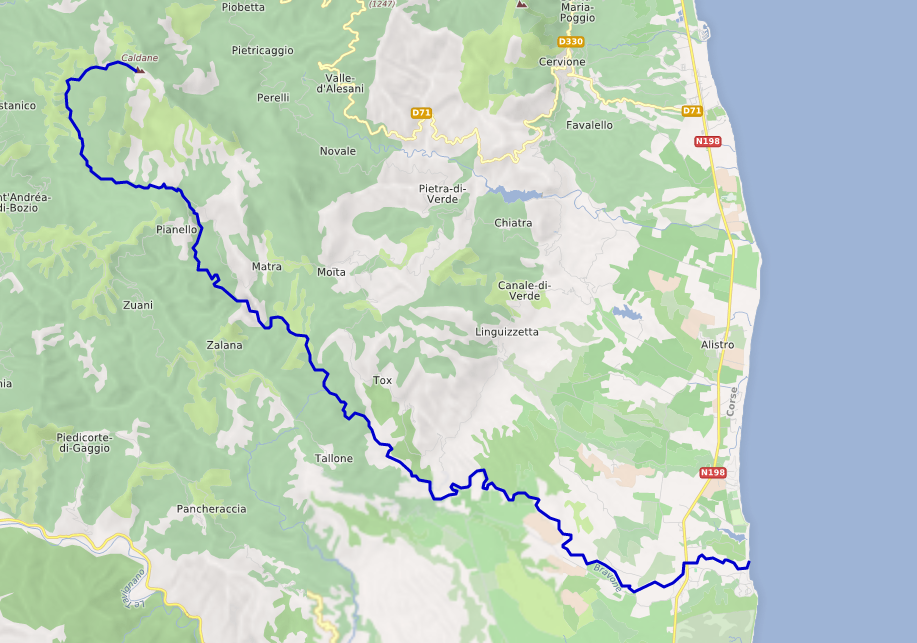
- Course of the Bravona

- Location within Corsica Location within France

Location
- Country: France
- Region: Corsica
- Department: Haute-Corse

Physical characteristics
- Mouth: Tyrrhenian Sea
  - coordinates: 42.2036°N 9.5562°E

The Bravone (or Bravona) is a small coastal river in the department of Haute-Corse, Corsica, France.

== Course ==
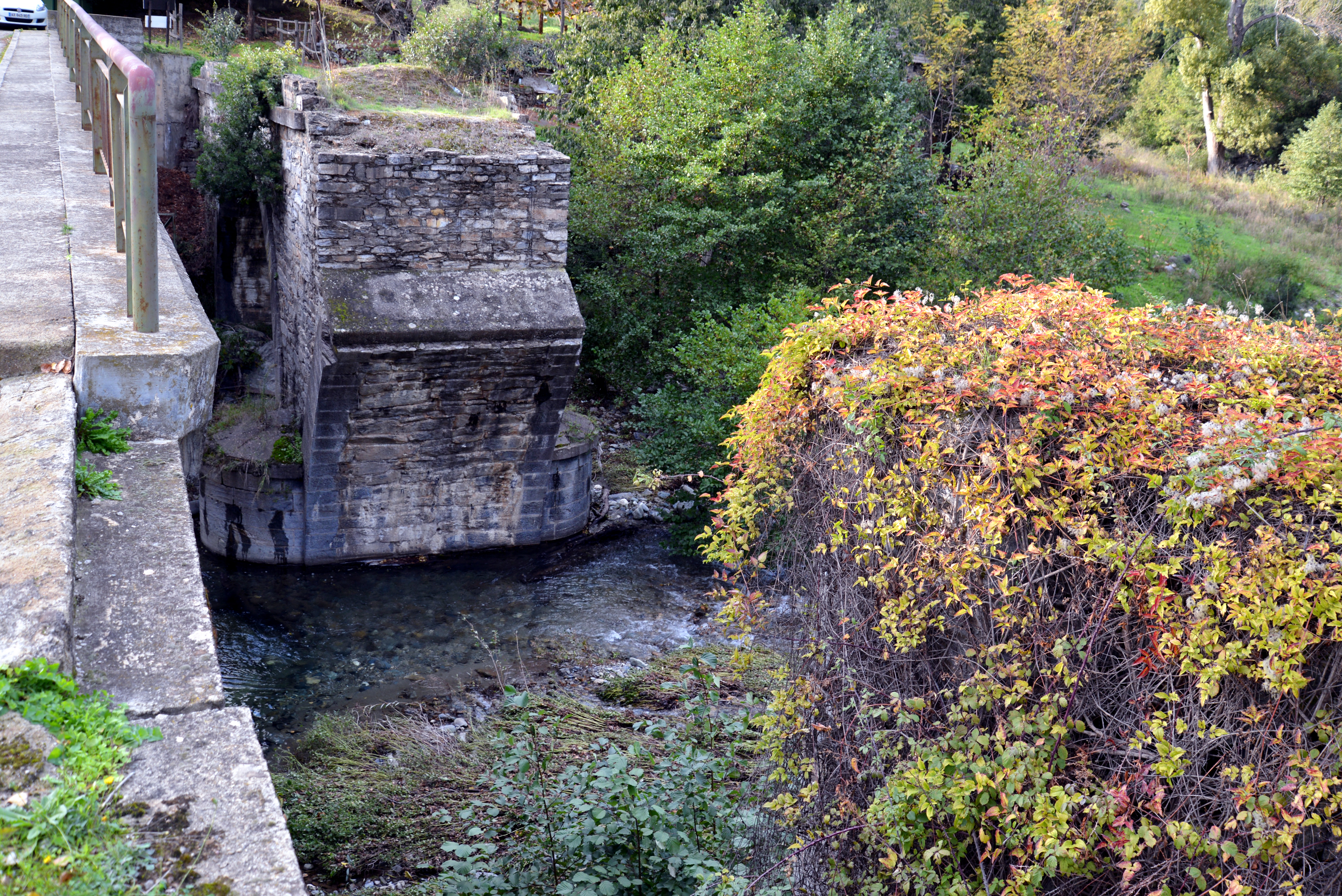
The old D16 bridge over the Bravone between Tallone and Tox, demolished by German troops in 1943

The Bravona is 37.19 kilometres (23.11 mi) long. It crosses the communes of Alzi, Bustanico, Campi, Linguizzetta, Matra, Mazzola, Moïta, Pianello, Tallone, Tox and Zalana.

The Bravona rises to the northeast of the 1,724 metres (5,656 ft) Punta di Caldane. In its upper reaches it flows west, then south, then east, then turns to the southeast past the village of Pianello. From here it flows in a generally southeast direction before flowing east to its mouth on the sea just north of Marine de Bravone. Through most of its course there is no major road beside the river.

== Valley ==
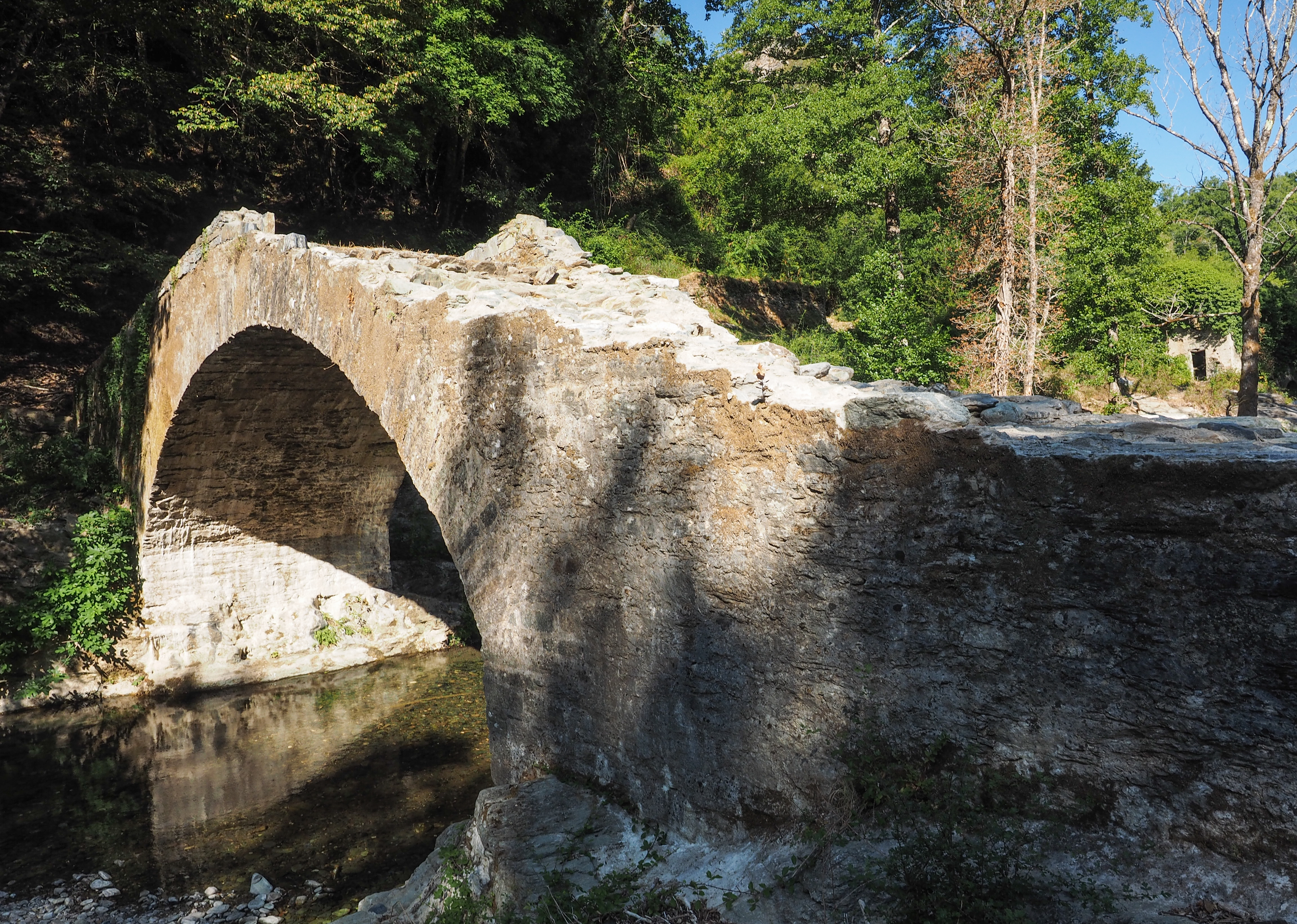
Aliso Genoese Bridge over the Bravone

As of 2021 the Bravone valley did not attract many tourists, even in the high season. It is accessible via the D16 and D116 roads. The D16 leads through the villages of Tox, Campi, Moïta and Matra on the northeast side of the valley. About 1 kilometre (0.62 mi) after Matra there is a lookout point from which a 20-minute hike along a trail leads down to the magnificent Genoese bridge of Aliso. About 4 kilometres (2.5 mi) above the lookout point the road crosses to the west of the river. A five-minute walk upstream of the bridge along the river leads to the Bravone waterfall, set in an ancient forest, which falls into a large, deep basin. On the southwest side villages include Poggio, the charming hamlet of Pianelluccio and Ampriani, a hilltop village.

== Water quality ==
In the 1980s there were plans to build a rockfill dam on the Bravone. It would have covered 68 hectares (170 acres) and contained 1,650,000 cubic metres (58,000,000 cu ft) of water for use in irrigating 5,000 hectares (12,000 acres) of land in the eastern plain of Corsica. However, it was found that the river's waters were significantly contaminated by arsenic and antimony, so the project was abandoned. The contamination was due to intensive exploitation of an arsenic mine at the start of the 20th century on the banks of the Presa tributary near the village of Matra. Although levels of contamination drop further downstream, even at its mouth it is three times higher than is allowed by French and European regulations. The fish in the river are not safe to eat.

== Hydrology ==
Measurements of the river flow were taken at the Tallone [Moulin de Granagiu] station from 1961 to 1999. The watershed above this station covers 66.5 square kilometres (25.7 sq mi). Annual precipitation was calculated as 389 millimetres (15.3 in). The average flow of water throughout the year was 0.816 cubic metres per second (28.8 cu ft/s).

Average flow (cubic meters per second) by month for the period 1961 to 1999
Month	Flow
Jan	1.200
Feb	1.700
Mar	1.360
Apr	1.270
May	0.787
Jun	0.440
Jul	0.284
Aug	0.226
Sep	0.290
Oct	0.462
Nov	0.570
Dec	1.270

== Tributaries ==
The following streams (ruisseaux) are tributaries of the Bravone (ordered by length) and sub-tributaries:

- Vadone 9 km (5.6 mi)
- Zecche 5 km (3.1 mi)
- Presa 5 km (3.1 mi)
- Sonnente 5 km (3.1 mi)
- Valle Sottana 4 km (2.5 mi)
  - la Fontaine 3 km (1.9 mi)
  - Vignole 3 km (1.9 mi)
  - Tofo 2 km (1.2 mi)
- Siala 3 km (1.9 mi)
  - Pelaben 1 km (0.62 mi)
- Sambuchetto 3 km (1.9 mi)
  - Péri 1 km (0.62 mi)
- Prunellacce 3 km (1.9 mi)
- Canale 3 km (1.9 mi)
  - Padulone 3 km (1.9 mi)
- Meta 3 km (1.9 mi)
- Sorbo 3 km (1.9 mi)
  - Acqua d'Orso 1 km (0.62 mi)
  - Dicceppo 1 km (0.62 mi)
- Scandolajo 3 km (1.9 mi)
- Nespoli 2 km (1.2 mi)
- Marignani 2 km (1.2 mi)
  - Suaracce 3 km (1.9 mi)
- Lupinaghio 2 km (1.2 mi)
- Suario 2 km (1.2 mi)
- Piedalitravi 2 km (1.2 mi)
- Roticelle 2 km (1.2 mi)
- Struscia 2 km (1.2 mi)
- Sambuchello 1 km (0.62 mi)
- Forciali 1 km (0.62 mi)
- Pediventulella 1 km (0.62 mi)
- Casaninchi 1 km (0.62 mi)
- Costadi 1 km (0.62 mi)
- Linareccia 1 km (0.62 mi)
- Piedivolgare 1 km (0.62 mi)
  - Tavolajo 1 km (0.62 mi)
- San Michèle 1 km (0.62 mi)
- Audimerza 1 km (0.62 mi)
- Filicaggio 1 km (0.62 mi)
- Casette 1 km (0.62 mi)
- Quencione 1 km (0.62 mi)
  - Mana 2 km (1.2 mi)

== Sources ==
- "Bravone Cascade", Paradisu (in French)
- "La Bravone à Tallone [Moulin de Granagiu]", eaufrance (in French), Ministère de l'Ecologie, du Développement Durable et de l'Energie
- "La vallée de Bravone", Paradisu (in French)
- "Plaine orientale La Bravone contaminée par l'arsenic", Corse Matin (in French), 13 October 2009
- "Relation: Bravona (7390827)", OpenStreetMap
- "Rivière de Bravona", Sandre (in French)
