= Aghione =

- Commune
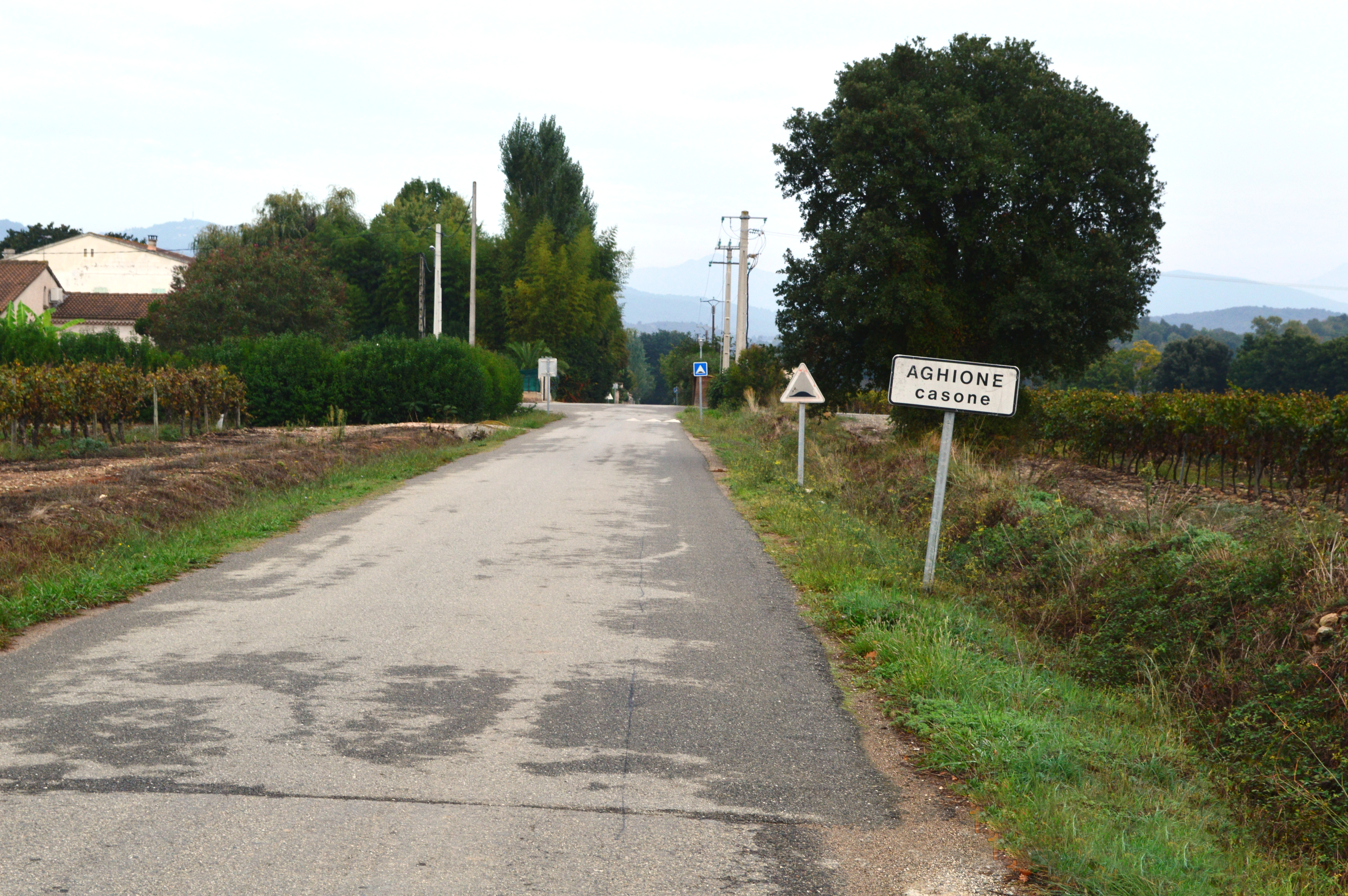
- The road into Aghione
- Location of Aghione
- Location within France Location within Corsica
- Coordinates: 42°06′45″N 9°24′05″E
- Country: France
- Region: Corsica
- Department: Haute-Corse
- Arrondissement: Corte
- Canton: Ghisonaccia
- Intercommunality: Oriente

Government
  - Mayor (2020–2026): André Casanova
- Area^{1}: 33.88 km^{2} (13.08 sq mi)
- Elevation: 66 m (217 ft)
- Highest elevation: 459 m (1,506 ft)
- Lowest elevation: 17 m (56 ft)
- Population (2023): 258
  - Density: 7.62/km^{2} (19.7/sq mi)
- Time zone: UTC+01:00 (CET)
  - Summer (DST): UTC+02:00 (CEST)
- INSEE/Postal code: 2B002 /20270
- ^{1} French Land Register data, which excludes lakes, ponds, glaciers > 1 km^{2} (0.386 sq mi or 247 acres) and river estuaries.

Aghione (Corsican: Aghjone) is a commune in the Haute-Corse department of France on the island of Corsica.

== Geography ==
Aghion is located on the eastern plains of Corsica 5 km west of Aleria. It can be accessed by the D343 road which comes from the National Highway N198 in the south east and passes west through the southern plain of the commune to Maison Pierraggi in the west and continues on to Vezzani in the Tagnone Valley 25 kilometres (16 mi) away. From the D343 the D443 branches north at the hamlet of Samuleto and continues to the village before continuing north by a tortuous mountain route to Casevecchie.

The commune is watered by the Tagnone, a tributary of Tavignano that separates an area of hills to the north from the plain, which is larger in area, to the south. There is a large dam with a large lake in the south of the commune.

== History ==
During the Second World War Aghione aerodrome was used by the 306th Fighter Wing of the 15th US Air Force from 10 to 21 August 1944 to support Operation Dragoon (the Invasion of Southern France).

== Administration ==
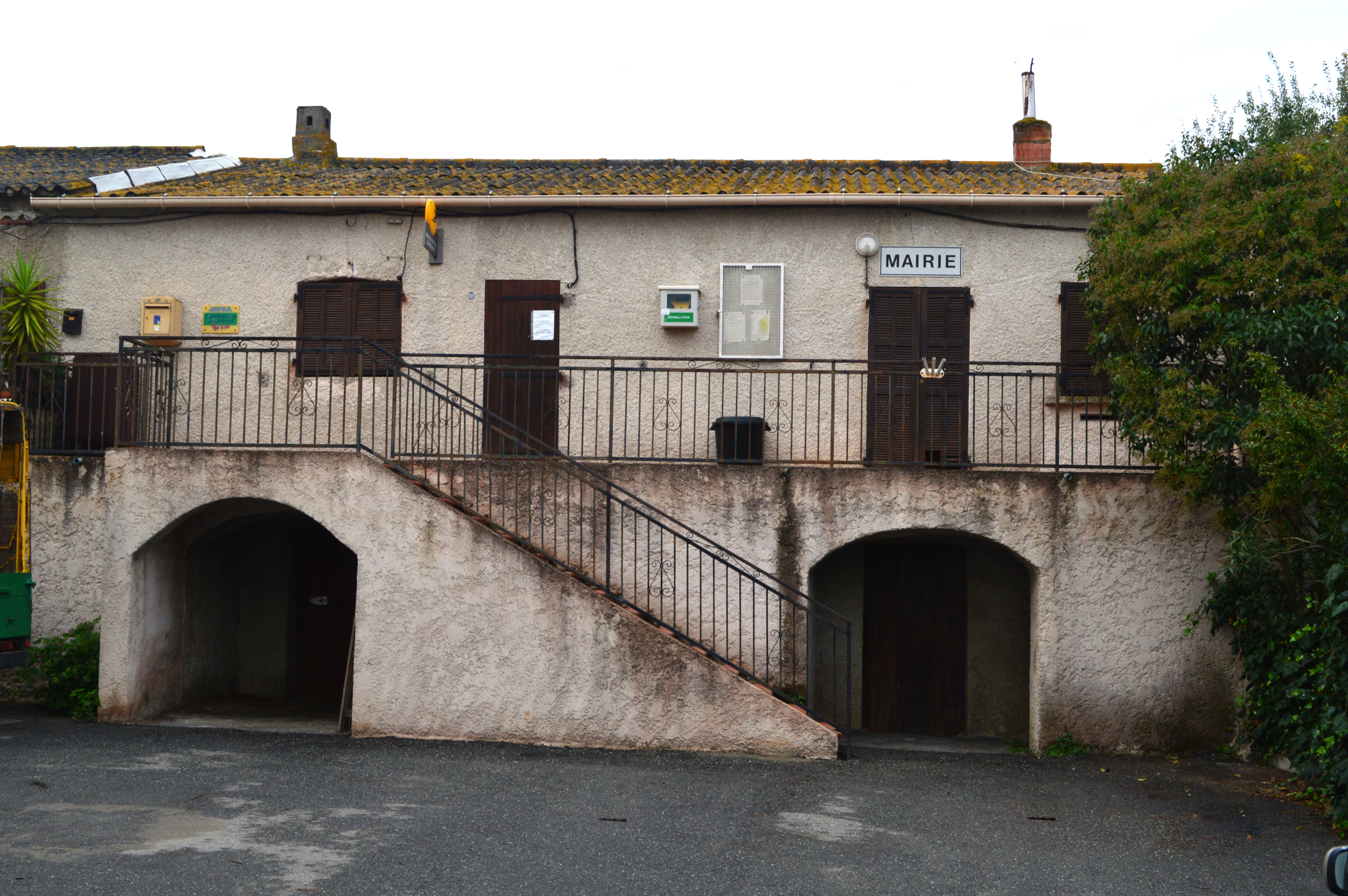
The Town Hall

List of Successive Mayors of Aghione

From	To	Name	Party
2001	2008	Jean Bladovini	DVD
2008	2026	André Casanova	DVD

== Population ==
The inhabitants of the commune are known as Aghionais or Aghionaises in French.

Historical population

Year	Pop.	±% p.a.
1866	287	—
1881	428	+2.70%
1901	404	−0.29%
1921	213	−3.15%
1936	176	−1.26%
1946	185	+0.50%
1954	100	−7.40%
1962	87	−1.73%
1968	93	+1.12%

Year	Pop.	±% p.a.
1975	279	+16.99%
1982	317	+1.84%
1990	282	−1.45%
1999	245	−1.55%
2007	234	−0.57%
2012	230	−0.34%
2017	241	+0.94%
2023	258	+1.14%

Source: EHESS and INSEE

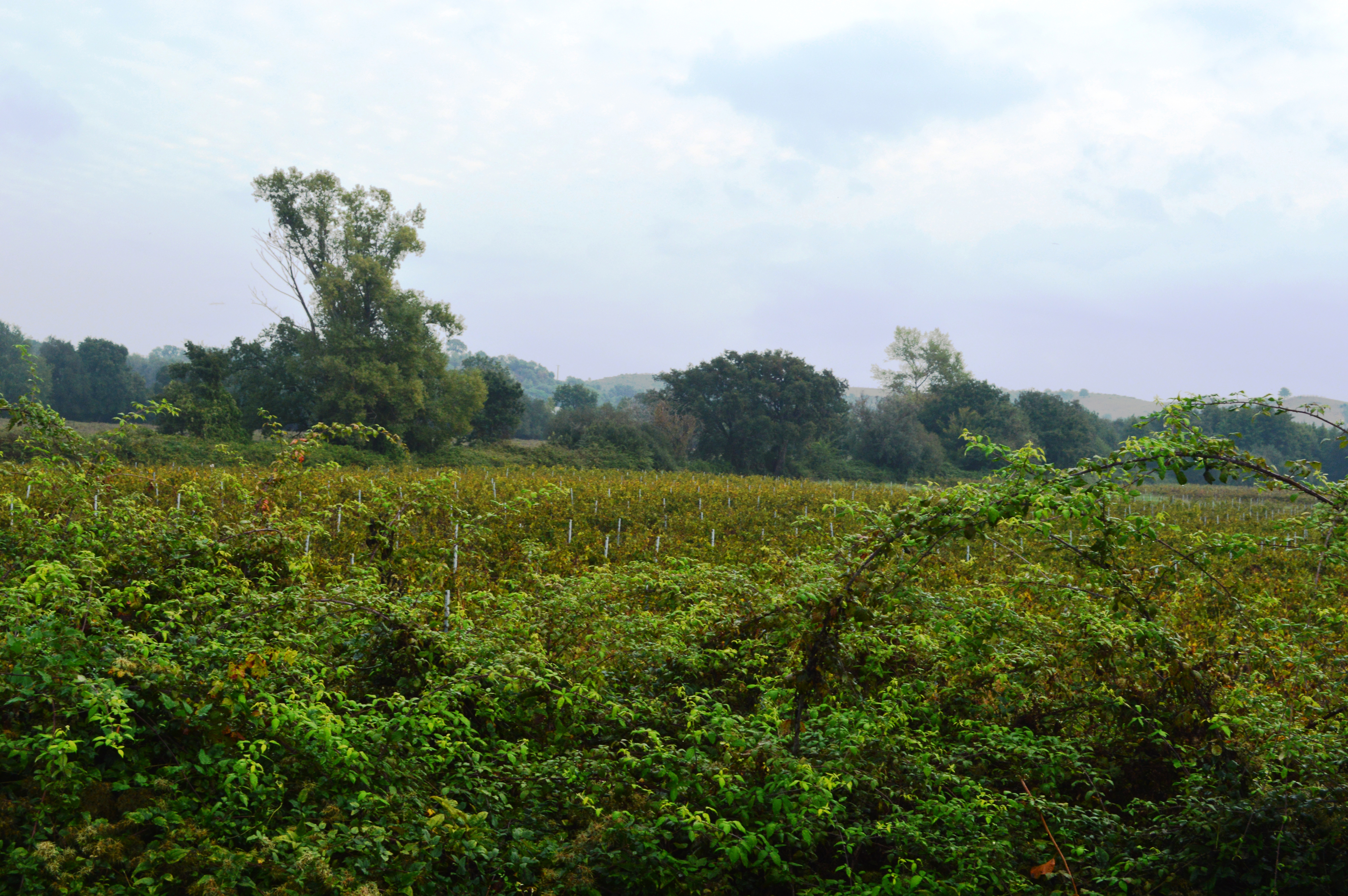
Aghione Landscape

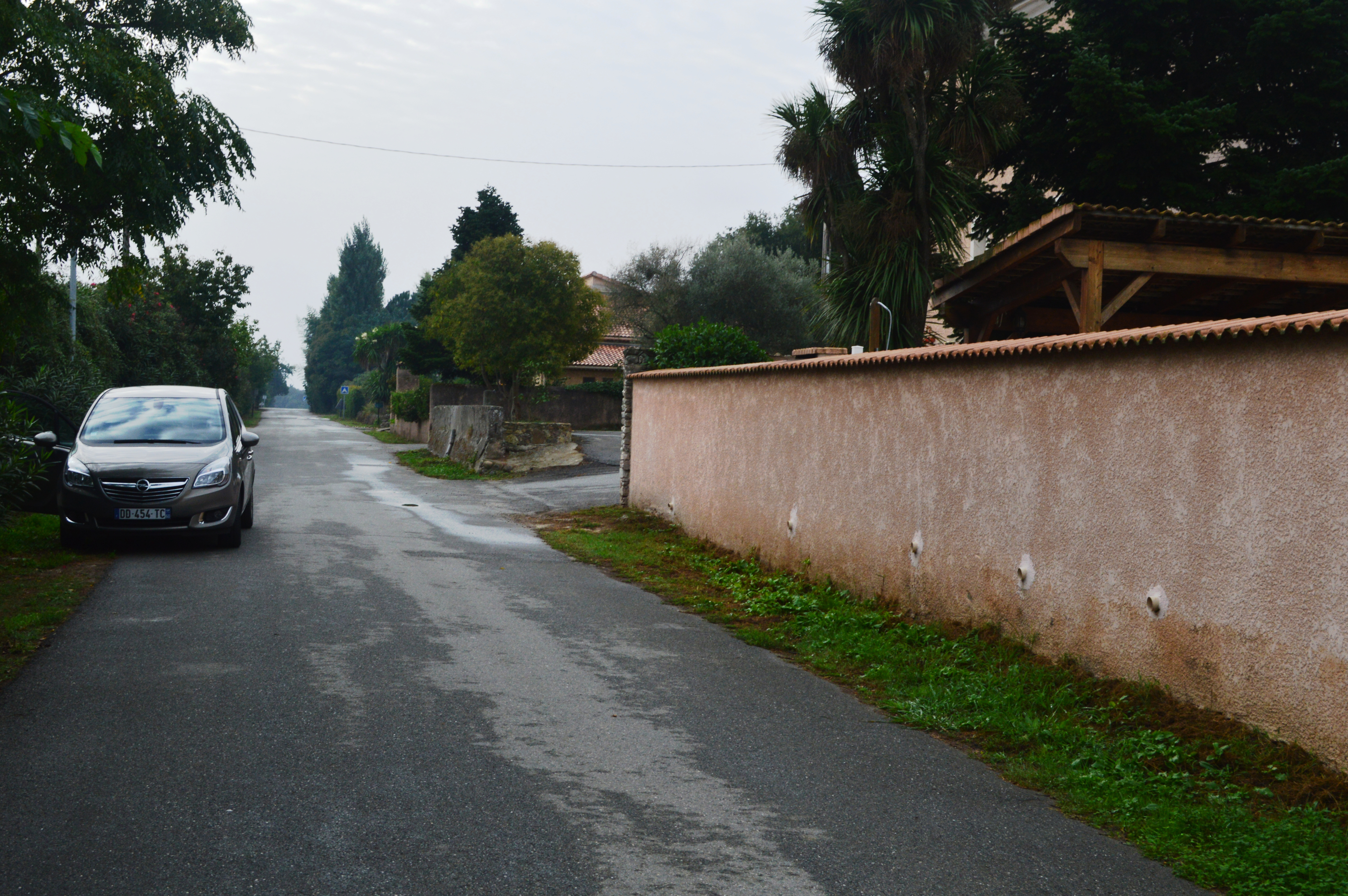
A street in Aghione

== Economy ==
The commune of Aghione is predominantly agricultural. The hills are used for grazing goats, sheep, and pigs; while the plain is planted with vines and fruit trees (kiwifruit, Mandarins). There is no farm of significant size located in the commune. In particular the grapes are collected by neighbouring wineries - mainly by the Aleria cooperative.

There are no longer any trades or services in the commune. The people find everything necessary at Aleria (10 km away) or Ghisonaccia (20 km away).

The commune has no access to the sea yet is close by (Alzitone is 5 kilometres from the coast). Aghione has no tourist facilities and does not have any second homes.

== Sites and monuments ==
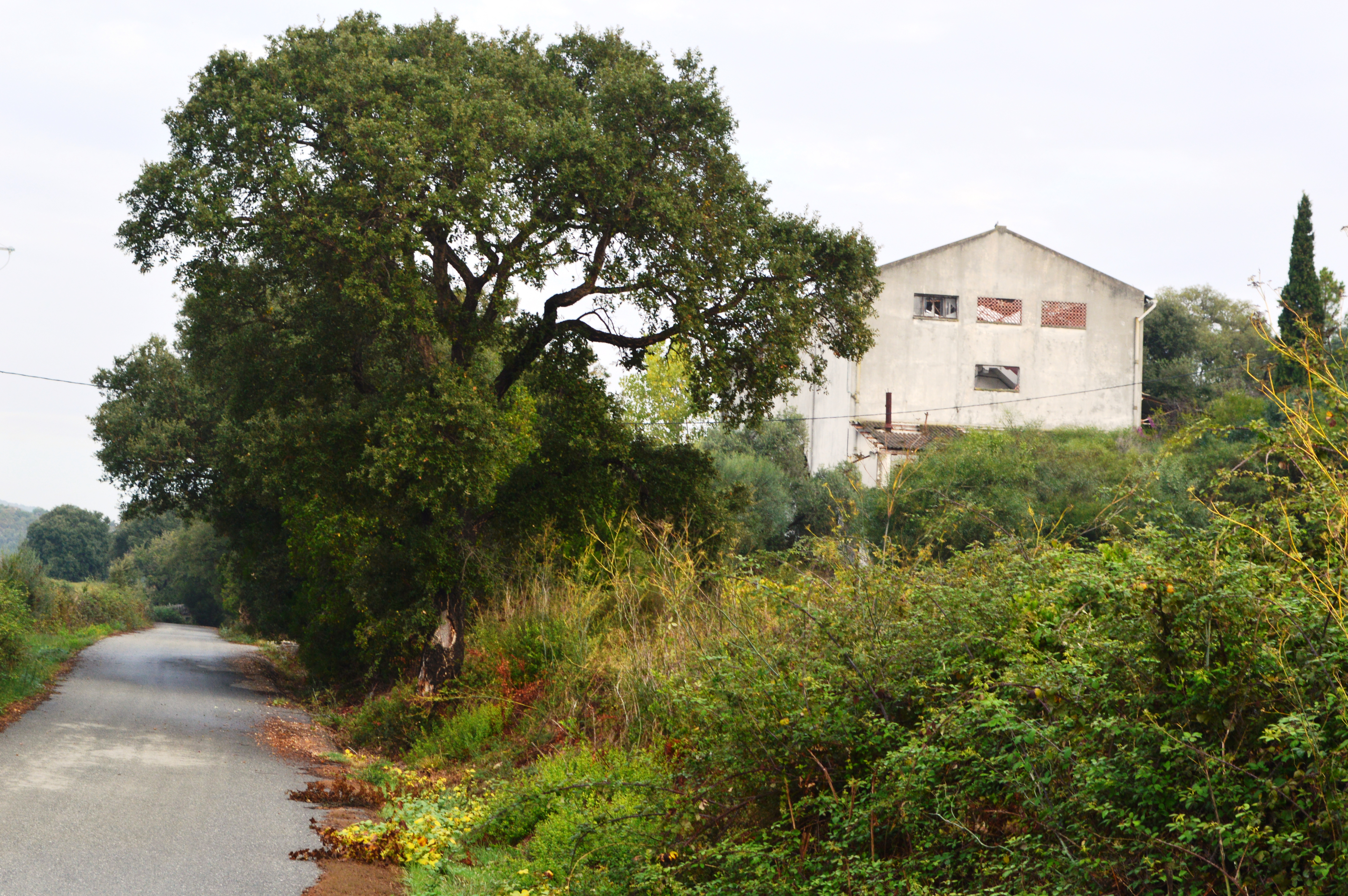
The abandoned sulphurous water spring at Puzzichello

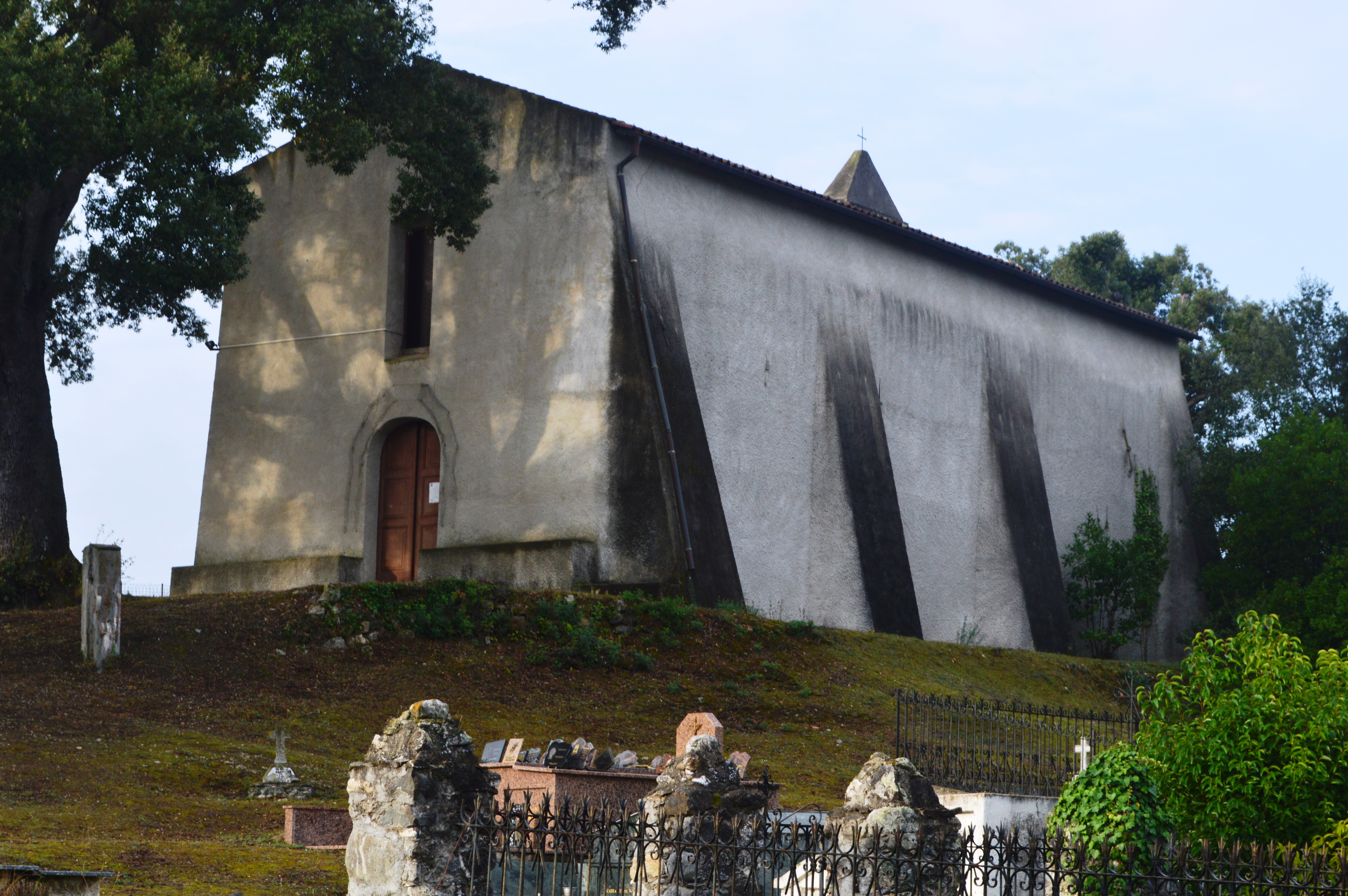
Aghione Church

- The sulphurous water spring of Puzzichello (site now abandoned)
- Alzitone Reservoir (artificial lake)
- An old railway line on the eastern plain

== See also ==
- Communes of the Haute-Corse department
