= Tox =

Tox or TOX may refer to:

== Science and technology ==
- TOX, a protein encoded by the TOX gene
- Tox screen, medical diagnostic screening for toxic substances

=== Computing ===
- Tox (protocol), peer-to-peer instant messaging software
- tox (Python testing wrapper), a tool used for continuous testing with the Python programming language

== Places ==
- Tox, Haute-Corse, a French commune on the island of Corsica

== People ==
- Daniel Halpin (born 1985), British graffiti artist also known as Tox
- Tox (Ninjago), a character in Ninjago

== See also ==
- Ton (disambiguation)
