= Alesani Reservoir =

Reservoir in Haute-Corse, France

- Réservoir d'Alesani (French)
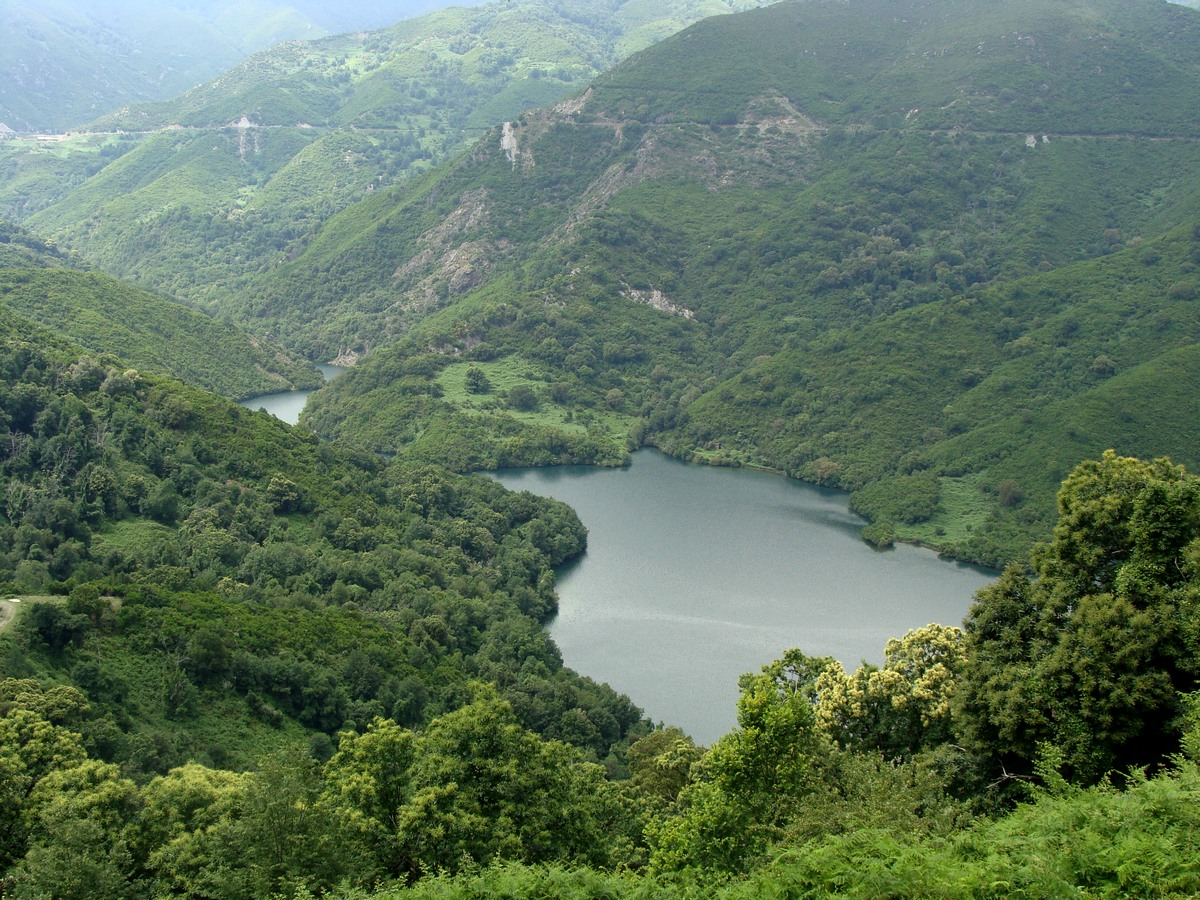
- Alesani Reservoir seen looking northwest from Chiatra. Above, the road from Sant'Andréa-di-Cotone to Ortale.

- Location within Corsica Location within France
- Location: Corsica
- Coordinates: 42.29839°N 9.47577°E
- Type: Reservoir
- Primary inflows: Alesani River
- Primary outflows: Alesani River
- Catchment area: 56 square kilometres (22 sq mi)
- Basin countries: France
- Surface area: 49 ha (120 acres)
- Water volume: 11,300,000 cubic metres (400,000,000 cu ft)
- Surface elevation: 165 m (541 ft)

Alesani Reservoir (French: Réservoir d'Alesani) or Alesani Lake (French: Lac de l'Alesani) is a reservoir in the Haute-Corse department of France formed in 1970 by damming the Alesani River with the Alesani Dam (French: Barrage d'Alésani). It is the main source of irrigation water along the east coast of Haute-Corse, and it also supplies water for human consumption and hydroelectric power generation.

== Location ==
The Alesani Reservoir is to the north of Chiatra and east of Pietra-di-Verde. The Alesani enters the reservoir from the northwest. The Spiscia and Mighiarette streams enter from the southwest. The D517 road crosses the dam at its east end. The dam is in the commune of Chiatra. The reservoir has a surface area of 49 hectares (120 acres) and a capacity of 11,300,000 cubic metres (400,000,000 cu ft). The catchment area is 56 square kilometres (22 sq mi).

== Dam ==
The reservoir is impounded by the Alesani Dam (Barrage d'Alésani), a rockfill structure 65 metres (213 ft) high with a crest length of 155 metres (509 ft). The crest elevation is 165 metres (541 ft) above sea level. The dam is faced with asphalt and concrete on the reservoir side. A 1.6 metres (5 ft 3 in) conduit carries water from the bottom outlet through a gallery under the embankment. Construction lasted from 1964 to 1969. The dam became operational in 1970. The reservoir stores water for irrigation and human consumption, and powers a hydroelectric plant.

The reservoir was partly drained and the dam was inspected in 2001. It was found that sediments at the toe of the dam were up to 15 metres (49 ft) thick, caused by major floods in the previous decade. The bottom valve was totally blocked and the water intake strainer was blocked for more than half its height. In the autumn the intake was heightened by 6 metres (20 ft) using a prefabricated structure. In August 2020, towards the end of the irrigation season, the Office d'équipment hydraulique de la Corse (OEHC) began to drain 3,000,000–4,000,000 cubic metres (110,000,000–140,000,000 cu ft) of water from the reservoir, lowering the water level in preparation for further maintenance work.

== Distribution of water ==
The water is used to irrigate the fields, plantations and vineyards of the center of the eastern plain of Corsica. The Alesani Reservoir supplies water by gravity. A DN 1200 pipe feeds a DN 900 pipe divided into a north and south branch. The northern branch interconnects with the Casinca perimeter, which allows gravity feed to the Golo irrigation system outside the intensive irrigation period. The southern branch is used to feed the Peri Reservoir in winter, and is interconnected with the south sector of the eastern plain, where the Bravone booster is located. The Peri reservoir has a pumping station that serves the high parts of the Linguizzetta perimeter.

== Ecology ==
The Alesani Reservoir has low biological importance. Flora include Cretan brake fern (Pteris cretica). Fish include brown trout (Salmo trutta). Invertebrates include copper demoiselle (Calopteryx haemorrhoidalis), willow emerald damselfly (Chalcolestes viridis) and black-tailed skimmer (Orthetrum cancellatum).

== Gallery ==
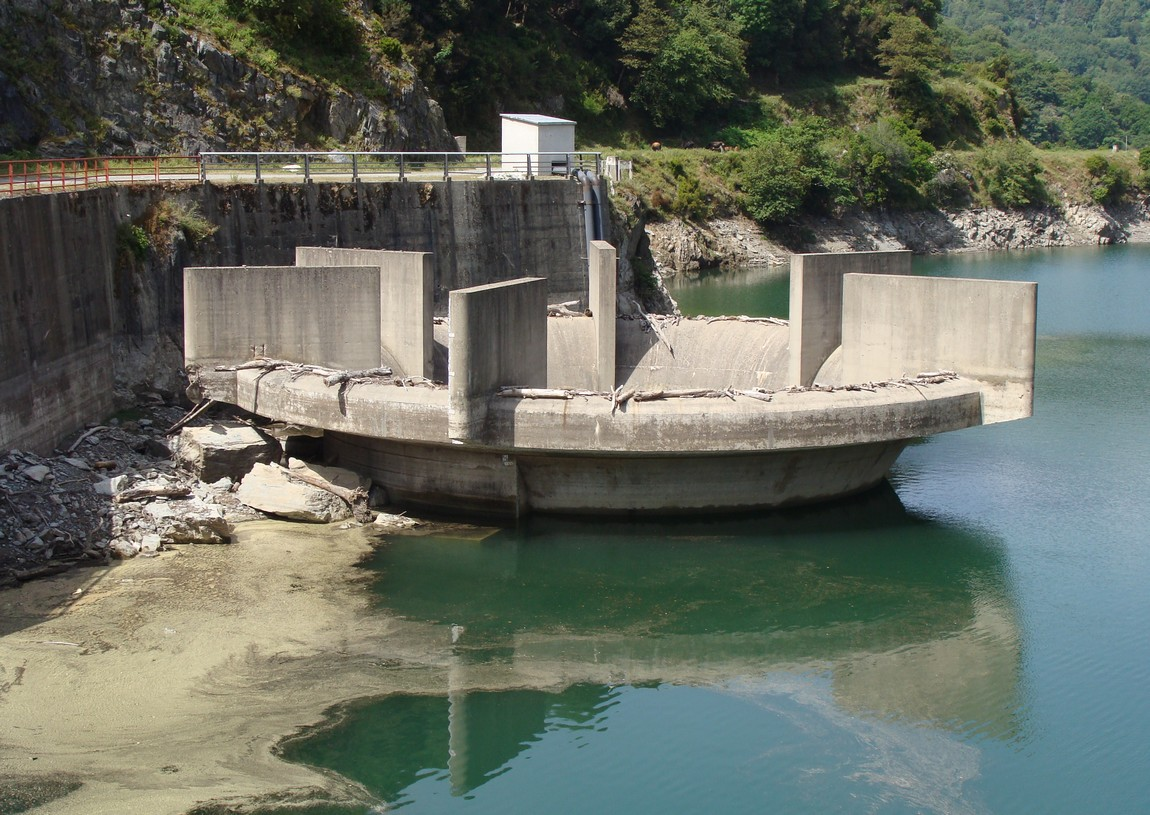
Abandoned intake structure beside the dam

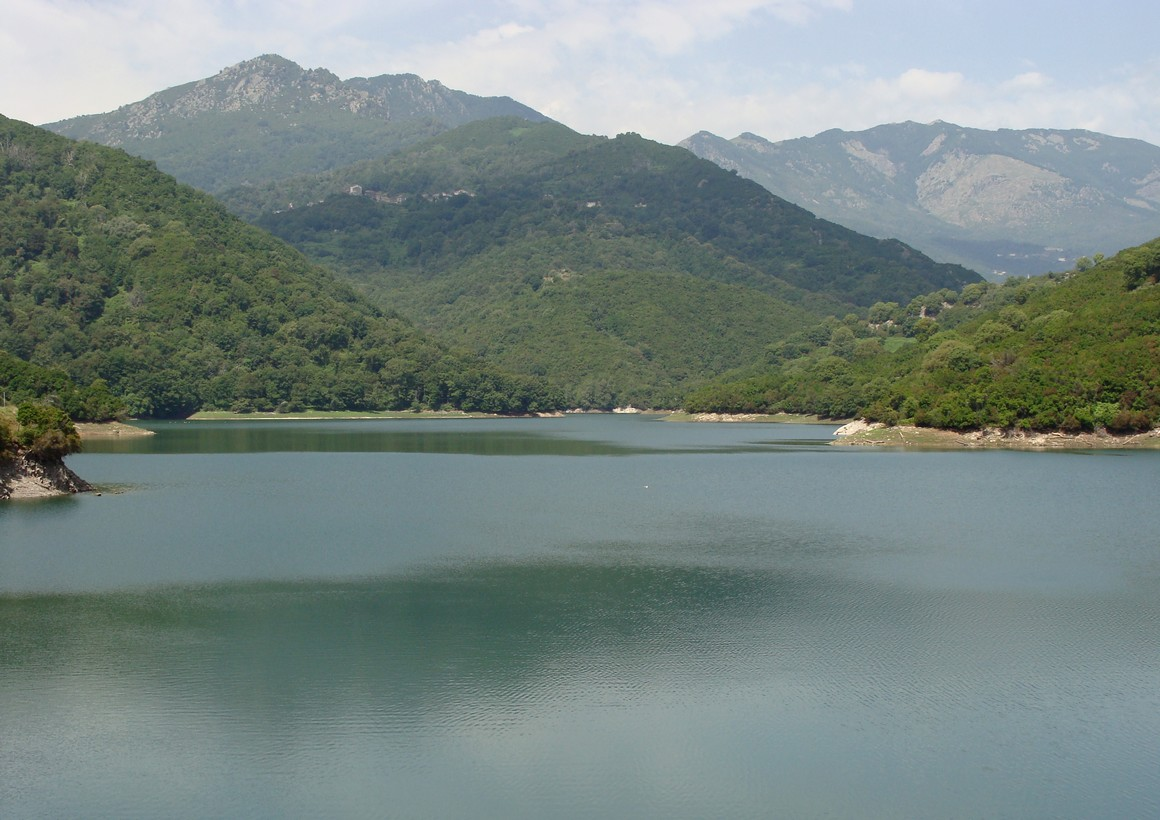
View of the lake from the dam

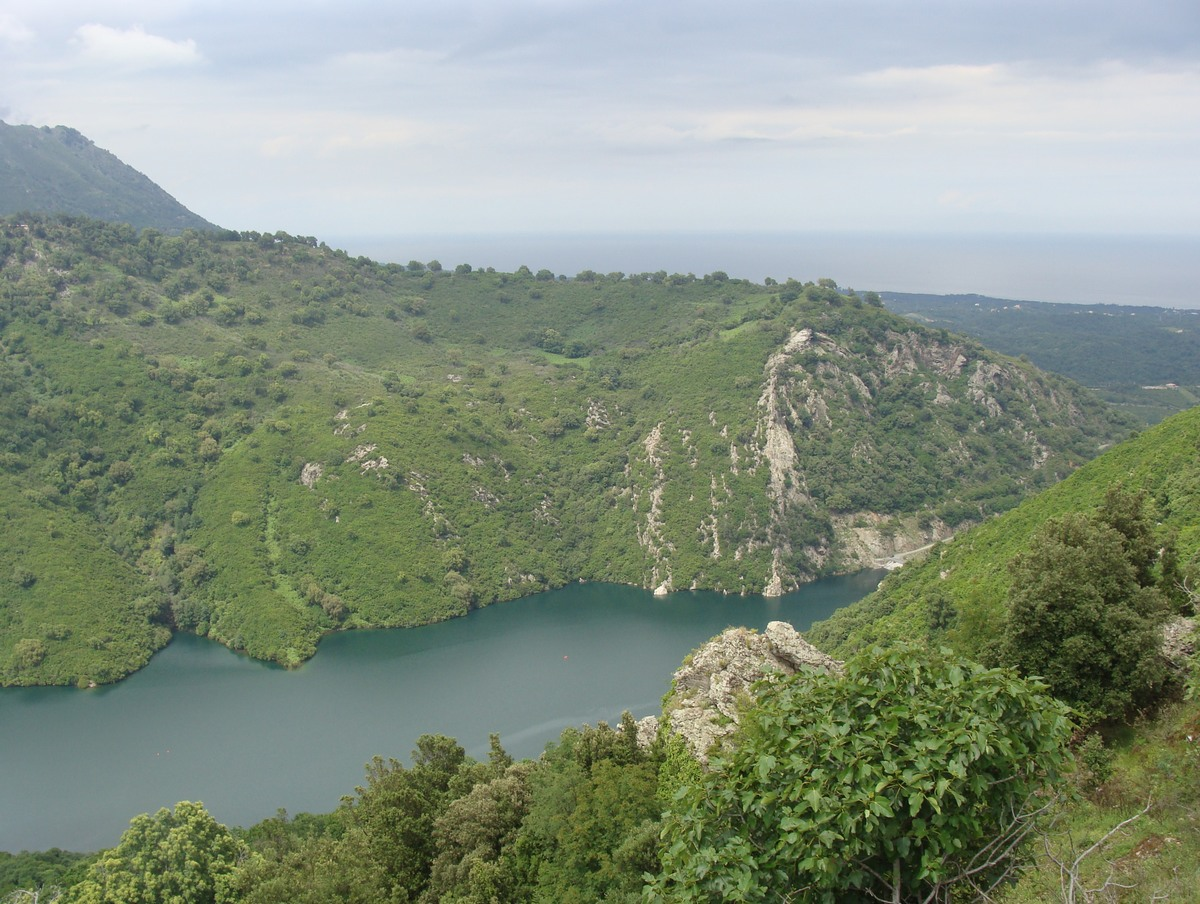
Looking northeast from Chiatra towards the dam, Tyrrhenian Sea in background

== Sources ==
- Assemblee de Corse (27 April 2017), Deliberation n° 17/108 AC de l'Assemblee de Corse decidant la construction de la nouvelle station de pompage d'eau brute de Peri (in French)
- Corse : Barrage d'Alésani (in French), Comité Français des Barrages et Réservoirs (CFBR)
- FR835COR420 - Lac de barrage d'Alésani (in French), Initiative PIM, Office de l’Environnement de la Corse (OEC), 2019
- "La vallée d'Alesani", Paradisu (in French)
- Mari, Nicole (17 August 2020), "Lancement des travaux au barrage de l'Alisiani Une ouverture de vanne pour une cure de jouvence", corsenetinfos (in French)
- Paoli, J.; Royet, P.; Tourment, R.; Isambert, F. (2009), Barrage de l'Alesani : sécurisation de l'unique prise d'eau menacée d'envasement, Office International de l'Eau
- "Way: Réservoir d'Alesani (28890156)", OpenStreetMap
