= Peri Reservoir =

- Réservoir de Peri (French)
- Location within Corsica Location within France
- Location: Corsica
- Coordinates: 42.26864°N 9.51386°E
- Type: Reservoir
- Basin countries: France

Peri Reservoir (French: Réservoir de Peri, Retenue de Peri) is a reservoir in the Haute-Corse department of France, on the island of Corsica. It supplies water for drinking and irrigation to the central section of the eastern plain of Corsica. In peak periods it also supplies water to the southern section.

== Location ==
The Peri Reservoir is in the commune of Canale-di-Verde to the north of the village of Calcinajole and the D17 road. It is drained by the Ruisseau de Strallerone, a tributary of the Alistro river.

== Dam ==
The Barrage de Peri is an embankment dam that came into service in 1964. It is 28 metres (92 ft) high and 180 metres (590 ft) long, with a crest elevation of 80 metres (260 ft). It impounds 3,000,000 cubic metres (110,000,000 cu ft) of water. The dam is operated by the Office d'Equipement Hydraulique de Corse.

== Reservoir ==
The reservoir covers 48 hectares (120 acres) and has a watershed of 0.8 kilometres (0.50 mi). It has little biological interest. Fish include European eel (Anguilla anguilla) and common carp (Cyprinus carpio). Fishing is allowed in most of the reservoir. It is limited to angling or casting from the shore, fishing from a flat-bottomed boat (oar, scull or pedal), and float tube fishing under some conditions.

== Irrigation system ==
The 10,500,000 cubic metres (370,000,000 cu ft) Alesani Reservoir supplies water by gravity to the center section of the eastern plain of Corsica. A DN 1200 pipe feeds a DN 900 pipe divided into a north and south branch. The northern branch interconnects with the Casinca perimeter, which allows gravity feed to the Golo irrigation system outside the intensive irrigation period. The southern branch is used to feed the Peri Reservoir in winter, and is interconnected with the south sector of the eastern plain, where the Bravone booster is located.

The Peri reservoir has a pumping station that serves the high parts of the Linguizzetta perimeter. In 2017 the Corsican Assembly decided to replace the pumping station, which was 40 years old and becoming difficult to maintain, with a modern station. The old station would remain operational while the new one was being built. The new station would have separate units to pump water to the Linguizzetta perimeter and to the south section of the plain via the Bravone booster.

== Sources ==
- Assemblee de Corse (27 April 2017), Deliberation n° 17/108 AC de l'Assemblee de Corse decidant la construction de la nouvelle station de pompage d'eau brute de Peri (in French)
- Corse : Barrage de Peri (in French), CFBR : Comité Français des Barrages et Réservoirs
- FR835COR060 - Retenue de Peri (in French), Initiative PIM, Office de l’Environnement de la Corse (OEC), 2019
- Liste des sites (in French), OEHC : Office d’Équipement Hydraulique de Corse
- "Way: Réservoir de Peri (28890157)", OpenStreetMap
