= Canton of Ghisonaccia =

Coordinates: 42.02°N 9.40°E

The canton of Ghisonaccia is an administrative division of the Haute-Corse department, southeastern France. It was created at the French canton reorganisation which came into effect in March 2015. Its seat is in Ghisonaccia.

It consists of the following communes:

1. Aghione
2. Aléria
3. Altiani
4. Ampriani
5. Antisanti
6. Campi
7. Casevecchie
8. Ghisonaccia
9. Giuncaggio
10. Linguizzetta
11. Matra
12. Moïta
13. Pancheraccia
14. Pianello
15. Piedicorte-di-Gaggio
16. Pietraserena
17. Tallone
18. Tox
19. Zalana
20. Zuani
