= Tour de Bravone =

Genoese coastal defence tower in Corsica

- Location within Corsica
- 42°11′41.9″N 9°33′11.1″E

History
- Built: Second half 16th century

The Tour de Bravone or Tour de Bravona (Corsican: Torra di Bravone) was a Genoese tower located in the commune of Linguizzetta on the east coast of Corsica. Only a few traces survive.

The tower was built in the second half of the 16th century. It was one of a series of coastal defences constructed by the Republic of Genoa between 1530 and 1620 to stem the attacks by Barbary pirates.

== See also ==
- List of Genoese towers in Corsica
