= Casevecchie =

- Commune
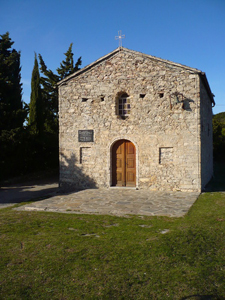
- The church of San-Michele
- Location of Casevecchie
- Location within France Location within Corsica
- Coordinates: 42°08′37″N 9°21′39″E
- Country: France
- Region: Corsica
- Department: Haute-Corse
- Arrondissement: Corte
- Canton: Ghisonaccia

Government
  - Mayor (2020–2026): Jean-Toussaint Paolacci
- Area^{1}: 9.06 km^{2} (3.50 sq mi)
- Elevation: 420 m (1,380 ft)
- Highest elevation: 729 m (2,392 ft)
- Lowest elevation: 106 m (348 ft)
- Population (2023): 69
  - Density: 7.6/km^{2} (20/sq mi)
- Time zone: UTC+01:00 (CET)
  - Summer (DST): UTC+02:00 (CEST)
- INSEE/Postal code: 2B075 /20270
- ^{1} French Land Register data, which excludes lakes, ponds, glaciers > 1 km^{2} (0.386 sq mi or 247 acres) and river estuaries.

Casevecchie is a commune in the Haute-Corse department of France on the island of Corsica.

== Population ==
Historical population
Year	Pop.	±% p.a.
1968	91	—
1975	94	+0.46%
1982	106	+1.73%
1990	87	−2.44%
1999	68	−2.70%
2007	65	−0.56%
2012	64	−0.31%
2017	67	+0.92%
2023	69	+0.49%
Source: INSEE

== See also ==
- Communes of the Haute-Corse department
