= Chiatra =

- Commune
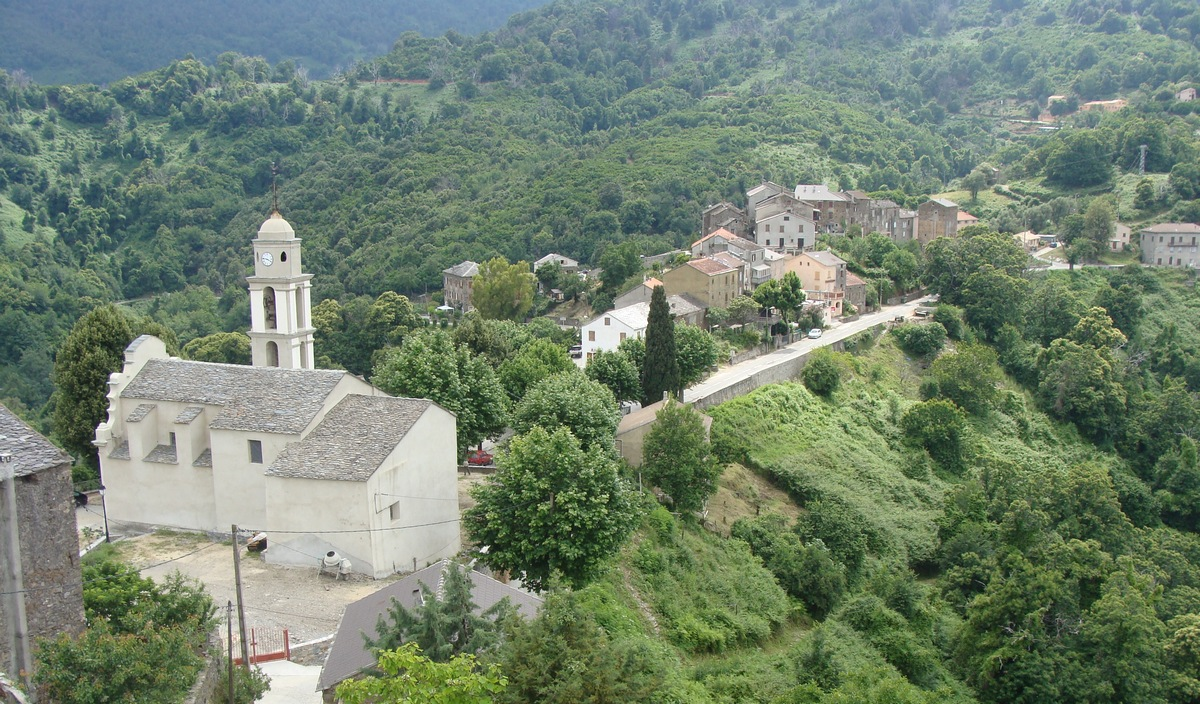
- The church and surrounding buildings in Chiatra
- Location of Chiatra
- Location within France Location within Corsica
- Coordinates: 42°17′34″N 9°28′34″E
- Country: France
- Region: Corsica
- Department: Haute-Corse
- Arrondissement: Corte
- Canton: Castagniccia

Government
  - Mayor (2020–2026): Pancrace Maurizi
- Area^{1}: 8.22 km^{2} (3.17 sq mi)
- Elevation: 408 m (1,339 ft)
- Highest elevation: 743 m (2,438 ft)
- Lowest elevation: 37 m (121 ft)
- Population (2023): 231
  - Density: 28.1/km^{2} (72.8/sq mi)
- Time zone: UTC+01:00 (CET)
  - Summer (DST): UTC+02:00 (CEST)
- INSEE/Postal code: 2B088 /20230
- ^{1} French Land Register data, which excludes lakes, ponds, glaciers > 1 km^{2} (0.386 sq mi or 247 acres) and river estuaries.

Chiatra (Italian pronunciation: [ˈkjaːtra], French: [kjatʁa]; Corsican: Chjatra) is a commune in the former Haute-Corse department of France on the island of Corsica.

The commune contains the Alesani Reservoir, formed by damming the Alesani River.

== Population ==
Historical population
Year	Pop.	±% p.a.
1968	229	—
1975	206	−1.50%
1982	194	−0.85%
1990	162	−2.23%
1999	190	+1.79%
2007	210	+1.26%
2012	206	−0.38%
2017	222	+1.51%
2023	231	+0.66%
Source: INSEE

== See also ==
- Communes of the Haute-Corse department
