= Zuani =

- Commune
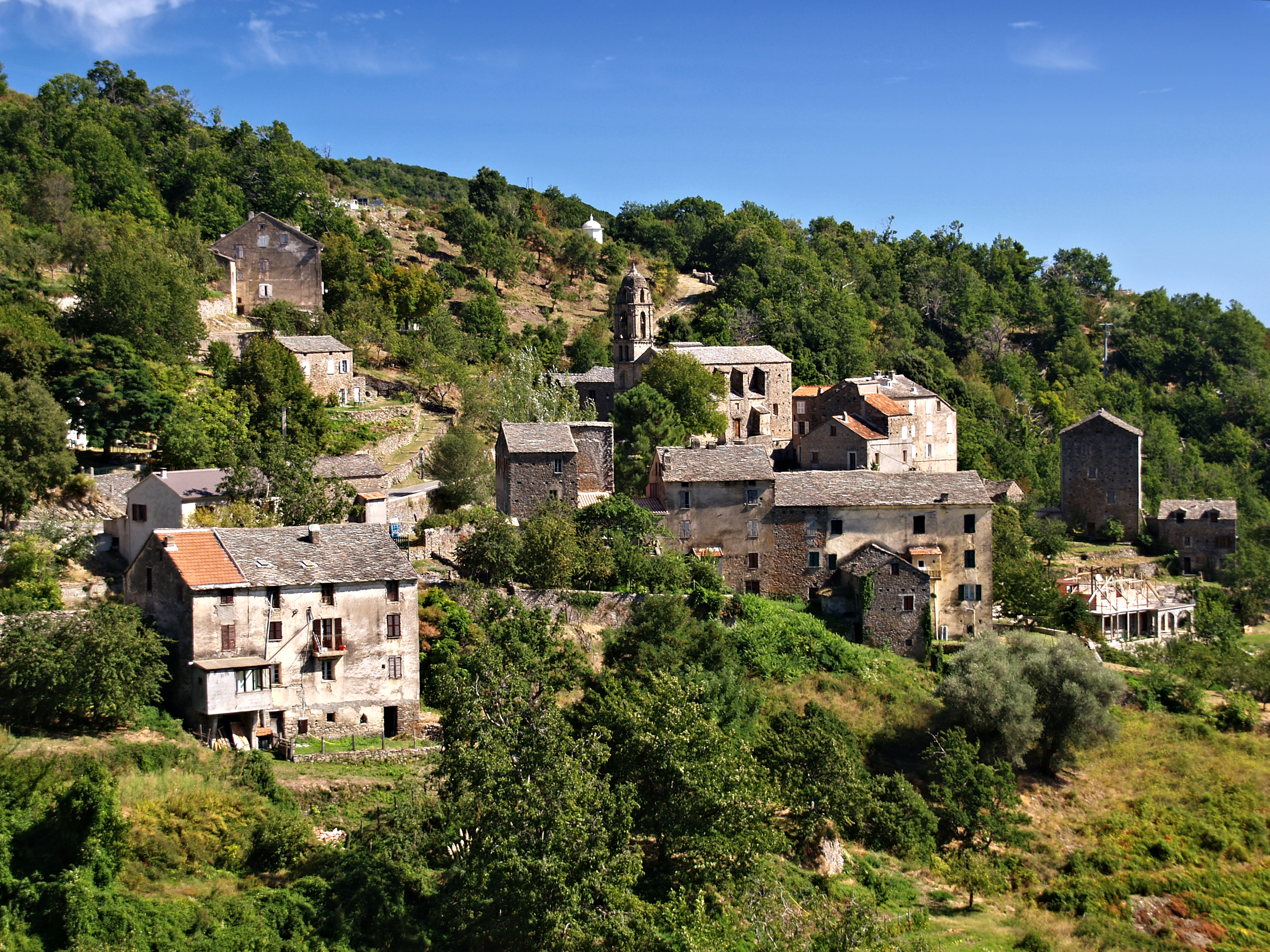
- A view of the centre of the village
- Location of Zuani
- Location within France Location within Corsica
- Coordinates: 42°16′20″N 9°20′49″E
- Country: France
- Region: Corsica
- Department: Haute-Corse
- Arrondissement: Corte
- Canton: Ghisonaccia
- Intercommunality: Oriente

Government
  - Mayor (2020–2026): Paul Giuganti
- Area^{1}: 5.16 km^{2} (1.99 sq mi)
- Elevation: 690 m (2,260 ft)
- Highest elevation: 1,013 m (3,323 ft)
- Lowest elevation: 411 m (1,348 ft)
- Population (2023): 37
  - Density: 7.2/km^{2} (19/sq mi)
- Demonym(s): Zuanais, Zuanaises
- Time zone: UTC+01:00 (CET)
  - Summer (DST): UTC+02:00 (CEST)
- INSEE/Postal code: 2B364 /20272
- ^{1} French Land Register data, which excludes lakes, ponds, glaciers > 1 km^{2} (0.386 sq mi or 247 acres) and river estuaries.

Zuani is a commune in the Haute-Corse department of France on the island of Corsica.

== Population ==
Historical population

Year	Pop.	±% p.a.
1800	276	—
1806	309	+1.90%
1821	217	−2.33%
1831	294	+3.08%
1836	343	+3.13%
1841	352	+0.52%
1846	357	+0.28%
1851	352	−0.28%
1856	341	−0.63%
1861	346	+0.29%
1866	368	+1.24%
1872	336	−1.50%
1876	346	+0.74%
1881	323	−1.37%
1886	407	+4.73%
1891	410	+0.15%
1896	503	+4.17%
1901	530	+1.05%

Year	Pop.	±% p.a.
1906	529	−0.04%
1911	540	+0.41%
1921	507	−0.63%
1926	507	+0.00%
1931	540	+1.27%
1936	199	−18.10%
1946	188	−0.57%
1954	120	−5.46%
1962	96	−2.75%
1968	95	−0.17%
1975	96	+0.15%
1982	100	+0.58%
1990	40	−10.82%
1999	51	+2.74%
2007	49	−0.50%
2012	30	−9.35%
2017	30	+0.00%
2023	37	+3.56%

Source: EHESS and INSEE

== See also ==
- Communes of the Haute-Corse department
