= Matra, Haute-Corse =

Matra
- Commune
- Location of Matra
- Location within France Location within Corsica
- Coordinates: 42°16′53″N 9°23′26″E
- Country: France
- Region: Corsica
- Department: Haute-Corse
- Arrondissement: Corte
- Canton: Ghisonaccia

Government
  - Mayor (2020–2026): Michel Palmieri
- Area^{1}: 6.49 km^{2} (2.51 sq mi)
- Elevation: 560 m (1,840 ft)
- Highest elevation: 1,120 m (3,670 ft)
- Lowest elevation: 240 m (790 ft)
- Population (2023): 54
  - Density: 8.3/km^{2} (22/sq mi)
- Time zone: UTC+01:00 (CET)
  - Summer (DST): UTC+02:00 (CEST)
- INSEE/Postal code: 2B155 /20270
- ^{1} French Land Register data, which excludes lakes, ponds, glaciers > 1 km^{2} (0.386 sq mi or 247 acres) and river estuaries.

Matra (French pronunciation: [matʁa]) is a commune in the Haute-Corse department of France on the island of Corsica.

== Population ==
Historical population
Year	Pop.	±% p.a.
1968	62	—
1975	72	+2.16%
1982	73	+0.20%
1990	63	−1.82%
1999	43	−4.15%
2007	50	+1.90%
2012	43	−2.97%
2017	44	+0.46%
2023	54	+3.47%
Source: INSEE

== See also ==
- Communes of the Haute-Corse department
