= Tallone =

- Commune
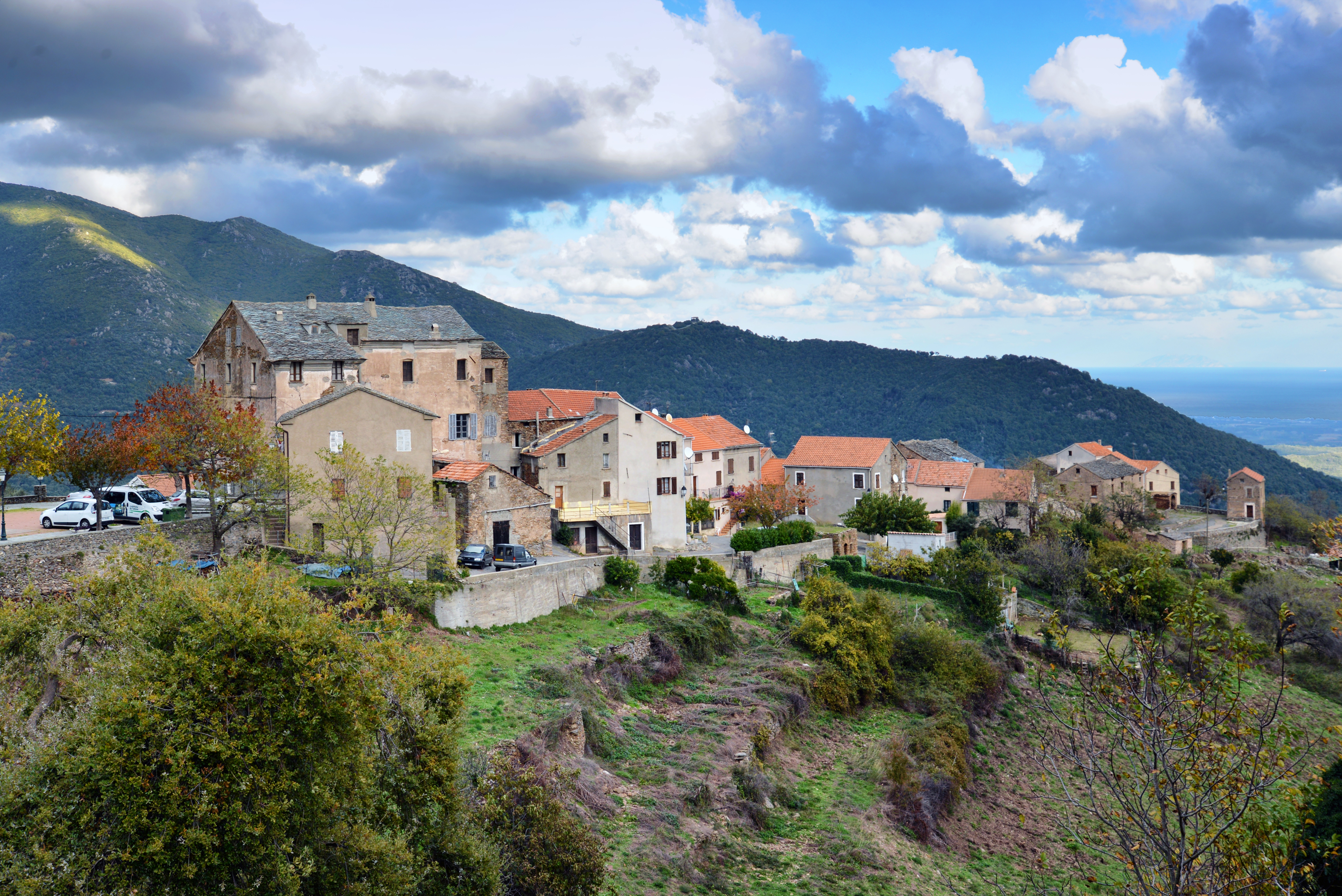
- A general view of Tallone, with the town hall and the church square on the left
- Location of Tallone
- Location within France Location within Corsica
- Coordinates: 42°13′55″N 9°24′53″E
- Country: France
- Region: Corsica
- Department: Haute-Corse
- Arrondissement: Corte
- Canton: Ghisonaccia

Government
  - Mayor (2020–2026): Christian Orsucci
- Area^{1}: 68.17 km^{2} (26.32 sq mi)
- Elevation: 465 m (1,526 ft)
- Highest elevation: 577 m (1,893 ft)
- Lowest elevation: 0 m (0 ft)
- Population (2023): 288
  - Density: 4.22/km^{2} (10.9/sq mi)
- Time zone: UTC+01:00 (CET)
  - Summer (DST): UTC+02:00 (CEST)
- INSEE/Postal code: 2B320 /20270
- ^{1} French Land Register data, which excludes lakes, ponds, glaciers > 1 km^{2} (0.386 sq mi or 247 acres) and river estuaries.

Tallone (French pronunciation: [talɔne]) is a commune in the Haute-Corse department of France on the island of Corsica.

== Population ==
Historical population
Year	Pop.	±% p.a.
1968	433	—
1975	637	+5.67%
1982	474	−4.13%
1990	469	−0.13%
1999	302	−4.77%
2007	309	+0.29%
2012	315	+0.39%
2017	315	+0.00%
2023	288	−1.48%
Source: INSEE

== See also ==
- Communes of the Haute-Corse department
- Former railway station
