= Campi, Haute-Corse =

Campi Campi
- Commune
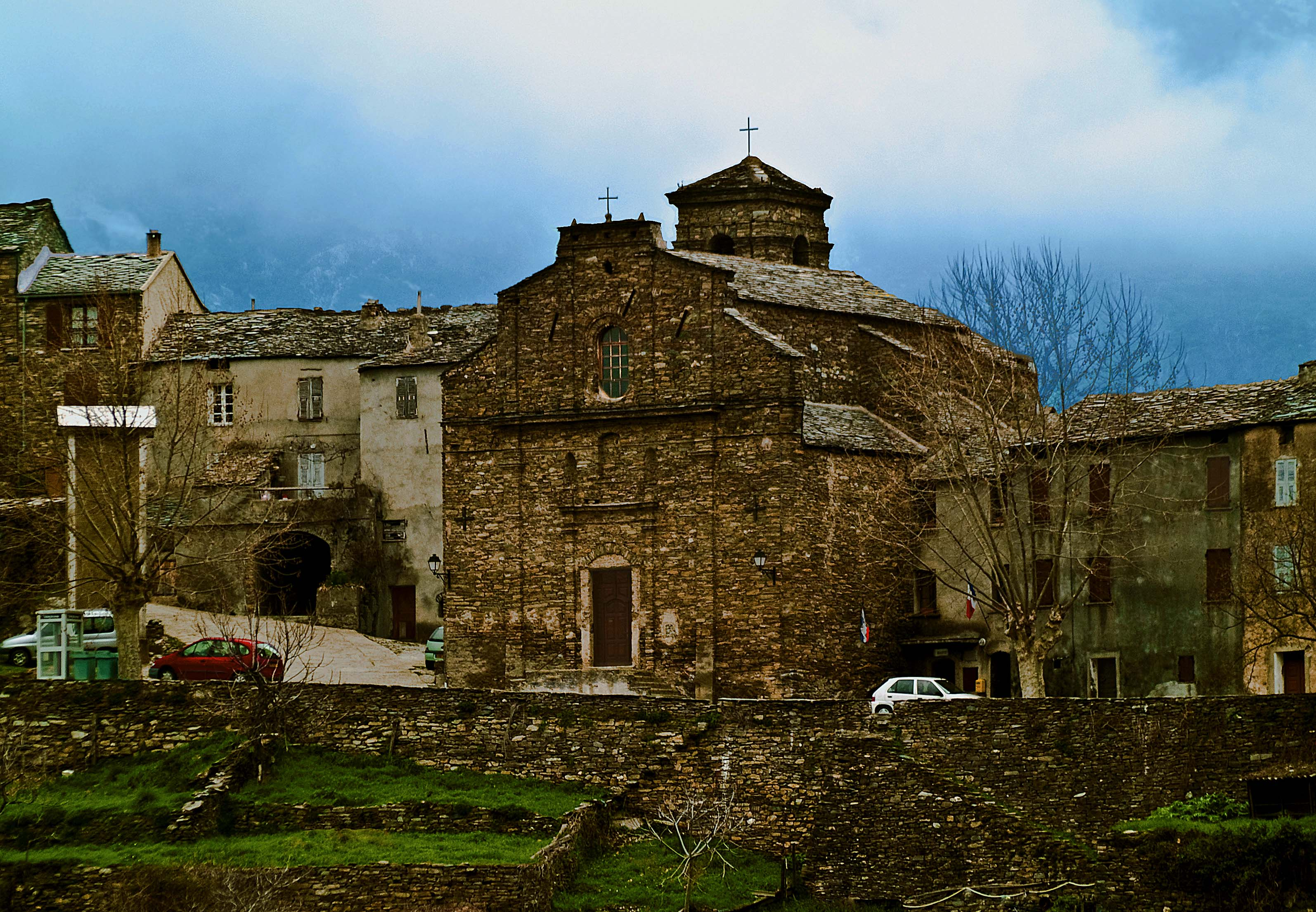
- Chapel of San Cervone
- Location of Campi
- Location within France Location within Corsica
- Coordinates: 42°16′09″N 9°25′25″E
- Country: France
- Region: Corsica
- Department: Haute-Corse
- Arrondissement: Corte
- Canton: Ghisonaccia

Government
  - Mayor (2020–2026): Ghislaine Pietri Filippi
- Area^{1}: 5 km^{2} (1.9 sq mi)
- Elevation: 554 m (1,818 ft)
- Highest elevation: 1,093 m (3,586 ft)
- Lowest elevation: 199 m (653 ft)
- Population (2023): 19
  - Density: 3.8/km^{2} (9.8/sq mi)
- Time zone: UTC+01:00 (CET)
  - Summer (DST): UTC+02:00 (CEST)
- INSEE/Postal code: 2B053 /20270
- ^{1} French Land Register data, which excludes lakes, ponds, glaciers > 1 km^{2} (0.386 sq mi or 247 acres) and river estuaries.

Campi is a commune in the Haute-Corse department of France on the island of Corsica.

== Administration ==
Campi is part of the canton of Ghisonaccia, together with 19 other communes.

== Geography ==
Campi is 2 kilometres (1.2 mi) to the southeast of Moïta. Its territory reaches the summit of Campana at 1,093 metres (3,586 ft). The village has beautiful old houses.

== Population ==
Historical population
Year	Pop.	±% p.a.
1968	78	—
1975	42	−8.46%
1982	40	−0.69%
1990	32	−2.75%
1999	28	−1.47%
2007	24	−1.91%
2012	18	−5.59%
2017	20	+2.13%
2023	19	−0.85%
Source: INSEE

== See also ==
- Communes of the Haute-Corse department
