= Pianello =

Pianello U Pianellu (Corsican)
- Commune
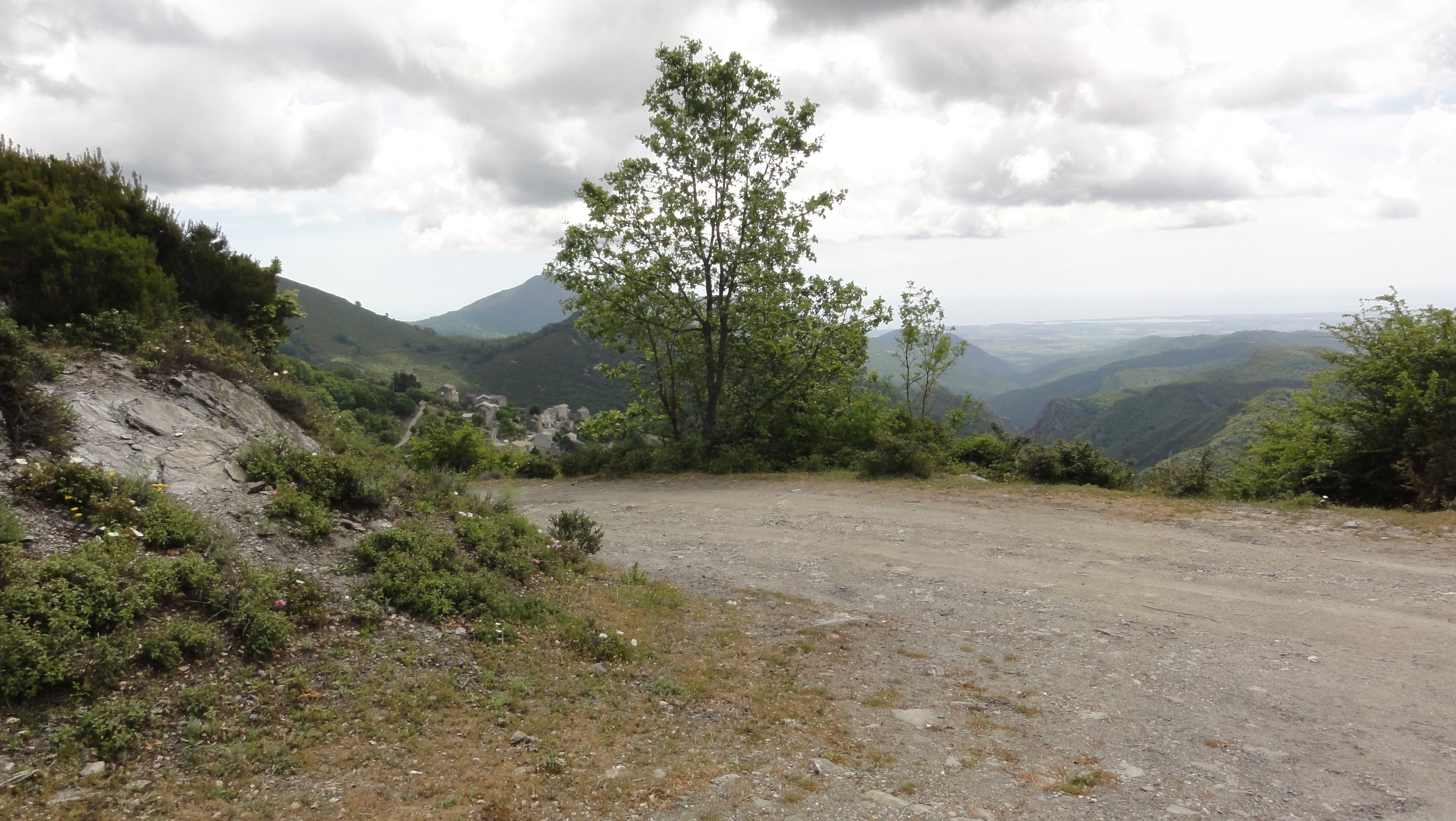
- Location of Pianello
- Location within France Location within Corsica
- Coordinates: 42°17′26″N 9°21′39″E
- Country: France
- Region: Corsica
- Department: Haute-Corse
- Arrondissement: Corte
- Canton: Ghisonaccia

Government
  - Mayor (2020–2026): Jean-François Paoli
- Area^{1}: 16.73 km^{2} (6.46 sq mi)
- Elevation: 811 m (2,661 ft)
- Highest elevation: 1,724 m (5,656 ft)
- Lowest elevation: 427 m (1,401 ft)
- Population (2023): 53
  - Density: 3.2/km^{2} (8.2/sq mi)
- Time zone: UTC+01:00 (CET)
  - Summer (DST): UTC+02:00 (CEST)
- INSEE/Postal code: 2B213 /20272
- ^{1} French Land Register data, which excludes lakes, ponds, glaciers > 1 km^{2} (0.386 sq mi or 247 acres) and river estuaries.

Pianello (French pronunciation: [pjanɛlo]; Corsican: U Pianellu, pronounced [u byɑ̃.ˈneː.lːu]) is a commune in the Haute-Corse department of France on the island of Corsica. The village is in the la Serra area, south east of Castagniccia.

== Population ==
Historical population
Year	Pop.	±% p.a.
1968	97	—
1975	86	−1.70%
1982	72	−2.51%
1990	83	+1.79%
1999	76	−0.97%
2007	80	+0.64%
2012	59	−5.91%
2017	70	+3.48%
2023	53	−4.53%
Source: INSEE

== See also ==
- Communes of the Haute-Corse department
