= Tox, Haute-Corse =

Tox Tocchisu
- Commune
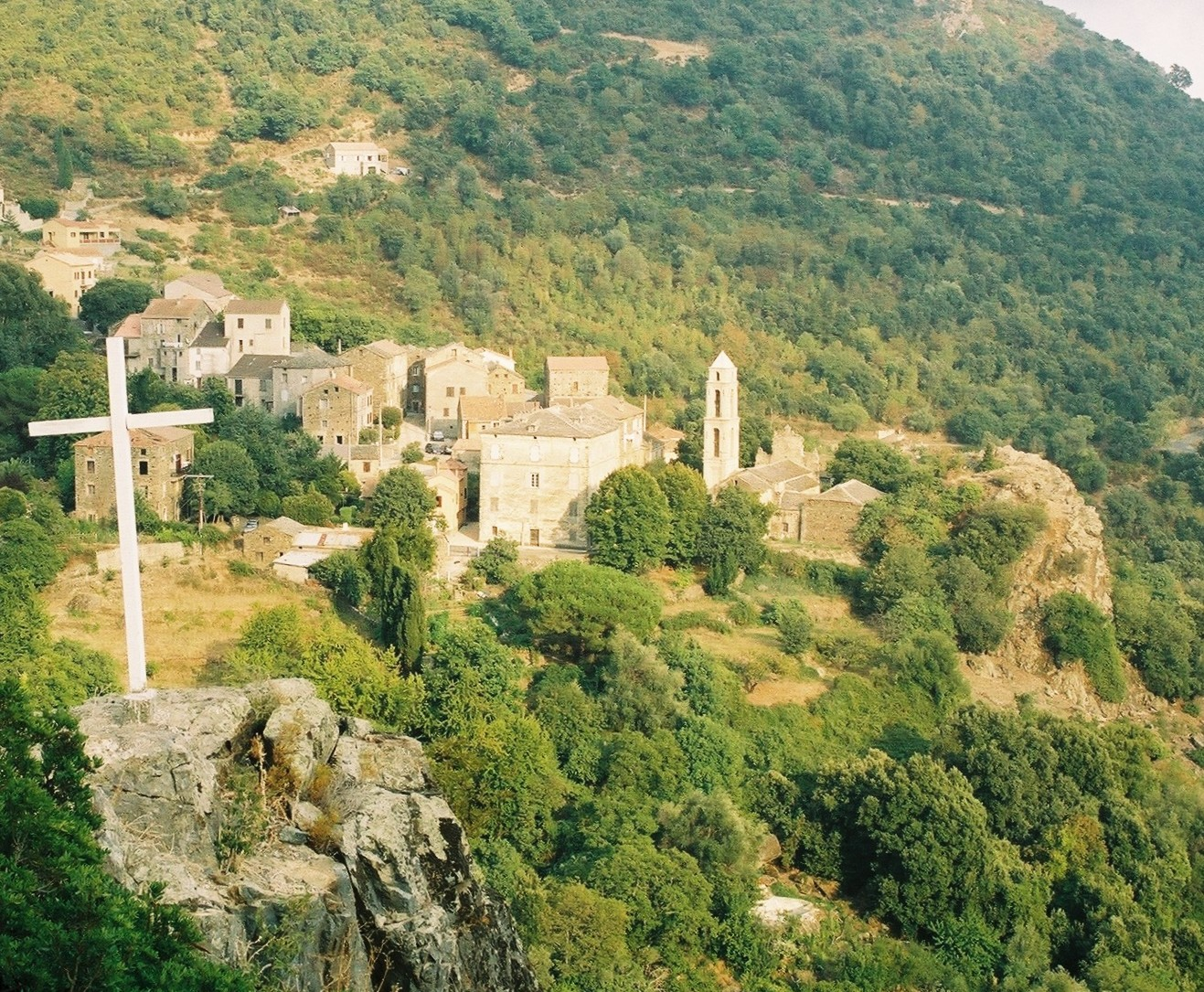
- Tox, seen from the road to Moïta
- Location of Tox
- Location within France Location within Corsica
- Coordinates: 42°15′07″N 9°25′51″E
- Country: France
- Region: Corsica
- Department: Haute-Corse
- Arrondissement: Corte
- Canton: Ghisonaccia

Government
  - Mayor (2020–2026): Pascal Chessa
- Area^{1}: 14.79 km^{2} (5.71 sq mi)
- Elevation: 440 m (1,440 ft)
- Highest elevation: 1,093 m (3,586 ft)
- Lowest elevation: 50 m (160 ft)
- Population (2023): 96
  - Density: 6.5/km^{2} (17/sq mi)
- Time zone: UTC+01:00 (CET)
  - Summer (DST): UTC+02:00 (CEST)
- INSEE/Postal code: 2B328 /20270
- ^{1} French Land Register data, which excludes lakes, ponds, glaciers > 1 km^{2} (0.386 sq mi or 247 acres) and river estuaries.

Tox is a commune in the Haute-Corse department of France on the island of Corsica.

== Population ==
Historical population
Year	Pop.	±% p.a.
1968	146	—
1975	148	+0.19%
1982	180	+2.84%
1990	169	−0.79%
1999	142	−1.92%
2007	111	−3.03%
2012	91	−3.90%
2017	96	+1.08%
2023	96	+0.00%
Source: INSEE

== See also ==
- Communes of the Haute-Corse department
