= Pietra-di-Verde =

- Commune
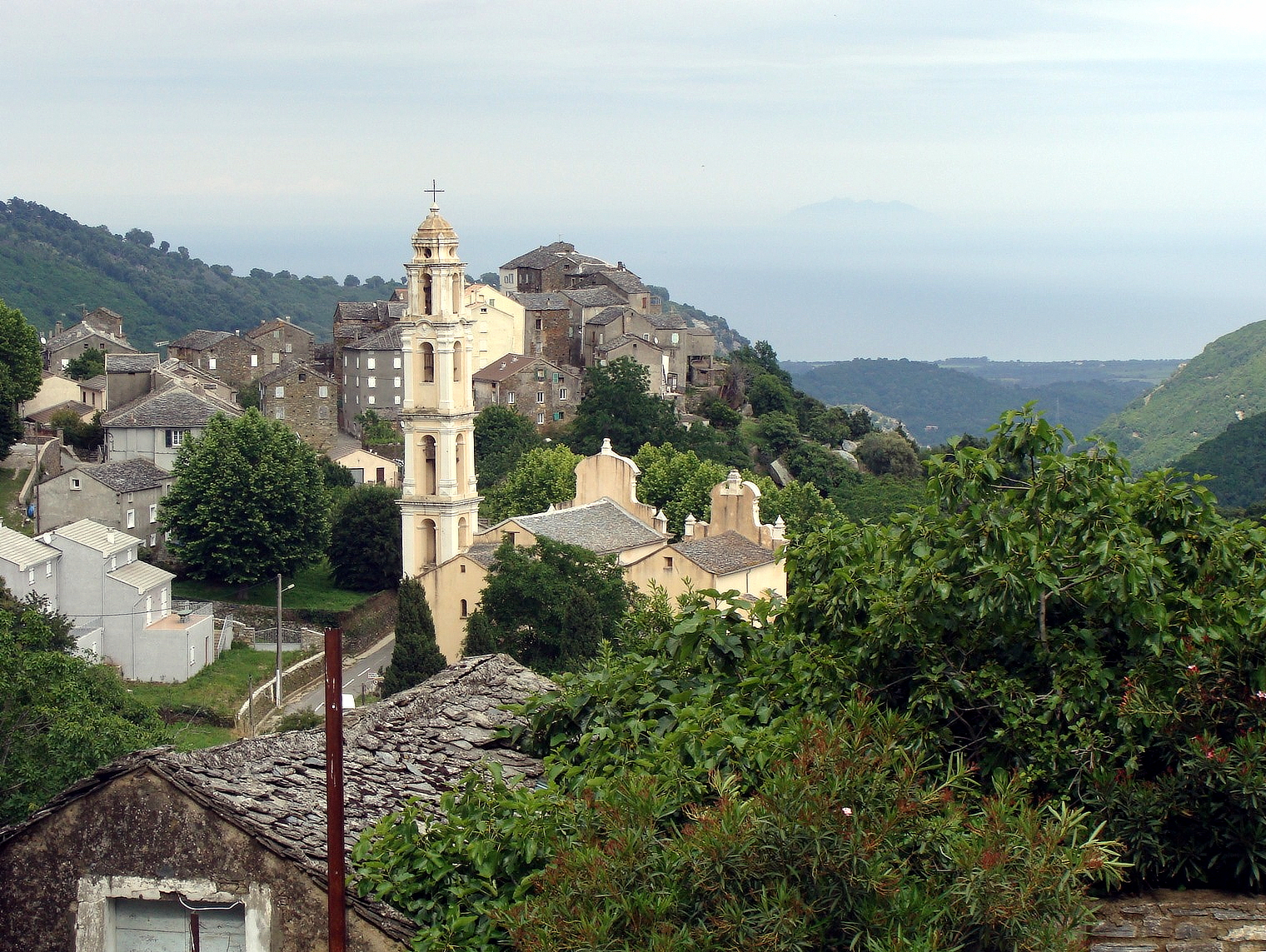
- The church and surrounding buildings in Pietra-di-Verde
- Location of Pietra-di-Verde
- Location within France Location within Corsica
- Coordinates: 42°17′57″N 9°27′03″E
- Country: France
- Region: Corsica
- Department: Haute-Corse
- Arrondissement: Corte
- Canton: Castagniccia

Government
  - Mayor (2020–2026): Jean Baptiste Santelli
- Area^{1}: 8.79 km^{2} (3.39 sq mi)
- Elevation: 480 m (1,570 ft)
- Highest elevation: 1,093 m (3,586 ft)
- Lowest elevation: 146 m (479 ft)
- Population (2023): 102
  - Density: 11.6/km^{2} (30.1/sq mi)
- Time zone: UTC+01:00 (CET)
  - Summer (DST): UTC+02:00 (CEST)
- INSEE/Postal code: 2B225 /20230
- ^{1} French Land Register data, which excludes lakes, ponds, glaciers > 1 km^{2} (0.386 sq mi or 247 acres) and river estuaries.

Pietra-di-Verde (French pronunciation: [pitʁa d(i) vɛʁd]) is a commune in the Haute-Corse department of France on the island of Corsica.

== Population ==
Historical population
Year	Pop.	±% p.a.
1968	196	—
1975	129	−5.80%
1982	79	−6.77%
1990	95	+2.33%
1999	115	+2.15%
2007	129	+1.45%
2012	111	−2.96%
2017	102	−1.68%
2023	102	+0.00%
Source: INSEE

== See also ==
- Communes of the Haute-Corse department
