= Zalana =

- Commune
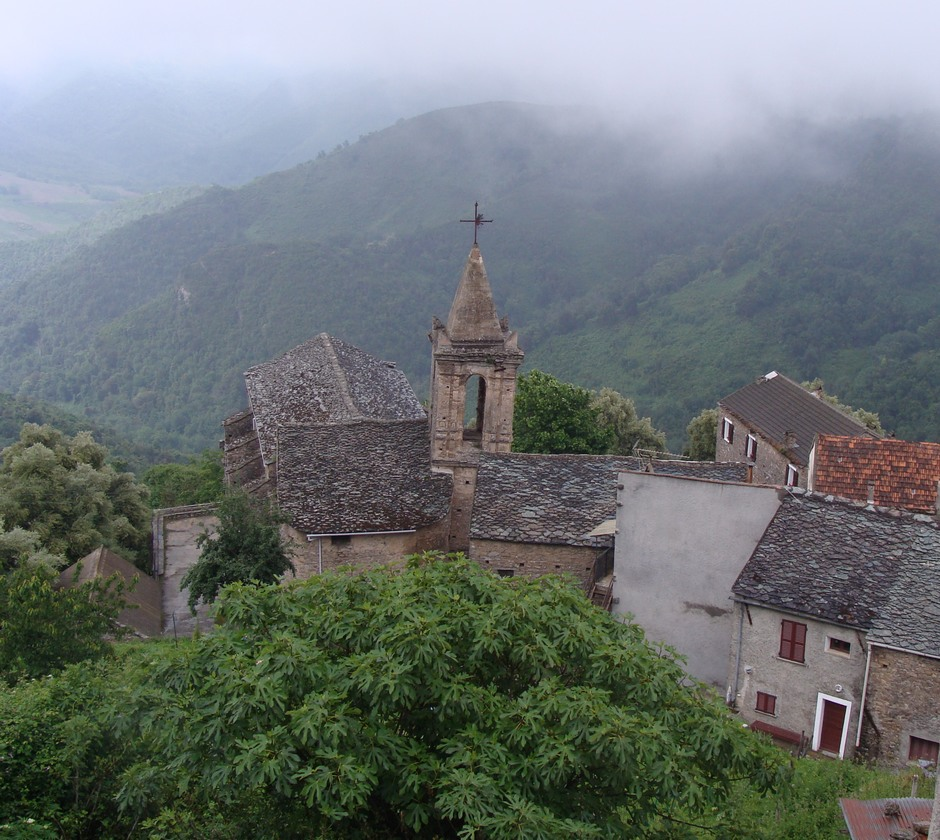
- The church of the Annunciation, before restoration, in A Belfasca
- Location of Zalana
- Location within France Location within Corsica
- Coordinates: 42°15′41″N 9°22′34″E
- Country: France
- Region: Corsica
- Department: Haute-Corse
- Arrondissement: Corte
- Canton: Ghisonaccia
- Intercommunality: Oriente

Government
  - Mayor (2020–2026): Clément Baggioni
- Area^{1}: 13.2 km^{2} (5.1 sq mi)
- Elevation: 600 m (2,000 ft)
- Highest elevation: 847 m (2,779 ft)
- Lowest elevation: 193 m (633 ft)
- Population (2023): 153
  - Density: 11.6/km^{2} (30.0/sq mi)
- Demonym(s): Zalanais, Zalanaises
- Time zone: UTC+01:00 (CET)
  - Summer (DST): UTC+02:00 (CEST)
- INSEE/Postal code: 2B356 /20272
- ^{1} French Land Register data, which excludes lakes, ponds, glaciers > 1 km^{2} (0.386 sq mi or 247 acres) and river estuaries.

Zalana is a commune in the Haute-Corse department of France on the island of Corsica.

== Geography ==
Zalana is in the Castagniccia region of Corsica in the Moïta-Verde canton. The village is located on the east coast of the island 22 km from the sea by road. The connecting road ends in the village. It is situated on the mountainside at an altitude of 675m and has a view over the sea. Located in the south of the Castagniccia region, it is a quiet, rural village away from the busy coastal cities and their tourists. Many pleasant walks begin in the village, including one that takes you to a typical Genoese bridge.

== Population ==
Historical population

Year	Pop.	±% p.a.
1800	494	—
1806	537	+1.40%
1821	491	−0.60%
1831	605	+2.11%
1836	607	+0.07%
1841	635	+0.91%
1846	644	+0.28%
1851	658	+0.43%
1856	747	+2.57%
1861	718	−0.79%
1866	701	−0.48%
1872	720	+0.45%
1876	695	−0.88%
1881	659	−1.06%
1886	732	+2.12%
1891	647	−2.44%
1896	1,039	+9.94%
1901	1,050	+0.21%

Year	Pop.	±% p.a.
1906	977	−1.43%
1911	824	−3.35%
1921	803	−0.26%
1926	832	+0.71%
1931	744	−2.21%
1936	864	+3.04%
1946	857	−0.08%
1954	362	−10.21%
1962	276	−3.33%
1968	243	−2.10%
1975	210	−2.06%
1982	164	−3.47%
1990	172	+0.60%
1999	128	−3.23%
2007	146	+1.66%
2012	135	−1.55%
2017	141	+0.87%
2023	153	+1.37%

Source: EHESS (1793-1999) and INSEE

== See also ==
- Communes of the Haute-Corse department
