= Linguizzetta =

- Commune
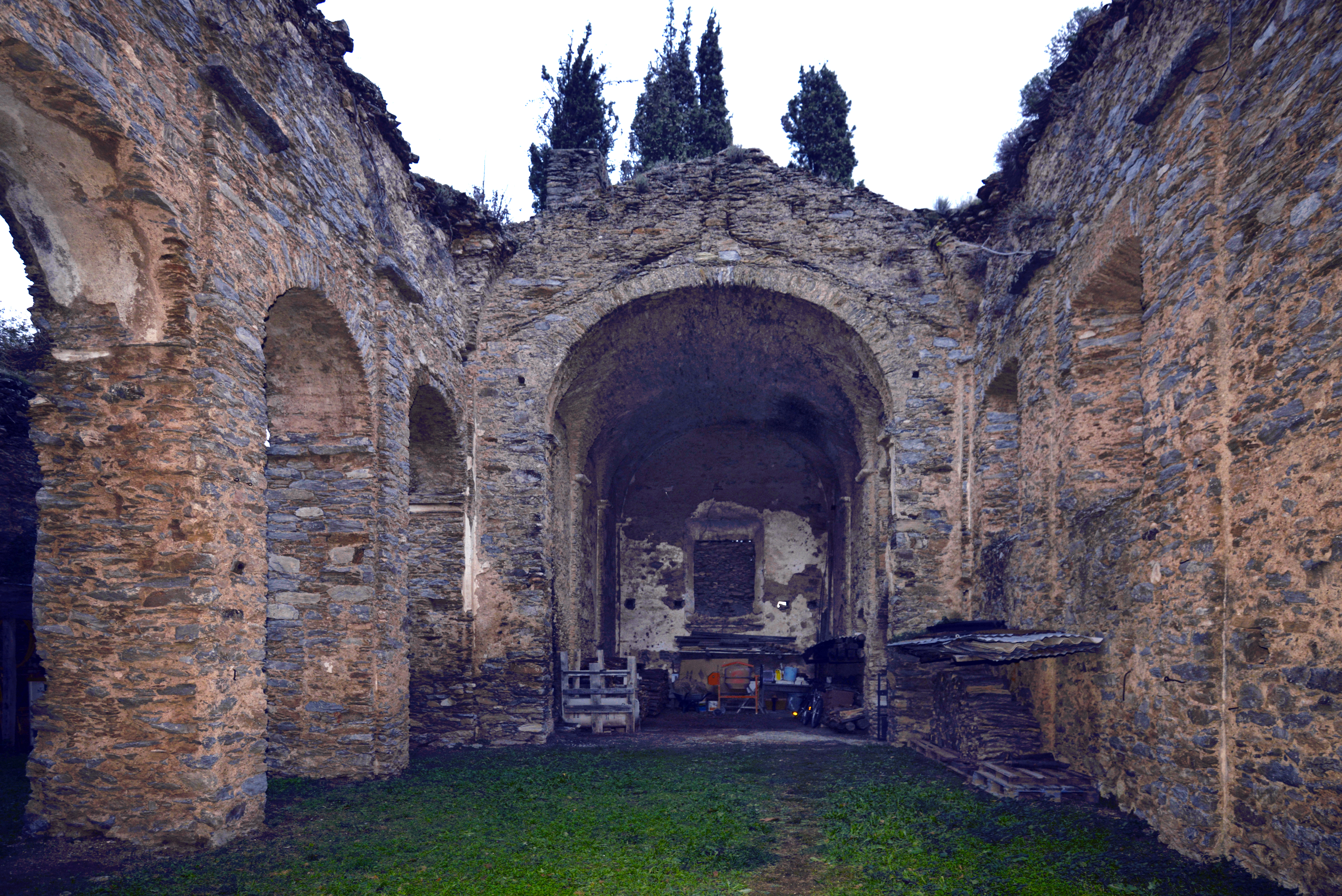
- The former convent of Verde, in Linguizzetta
- Location of Linguizzetta
- Location within France Location within Corsica
- Coordinates: 42°15′52″N 9°28′25″E
- Country: France
- Region: Corsica
- Department: Haute-Corse
- Arrondissement: Corte
- Canton: Ghisonaccia

Government
  - Mayor (2020–2026): Séverin Medori
- Area^{1}: 64.79 km^{2} (25.02 sq mi)
- Elevation: 170 m (560 ft)
- Highest elevation: 1,093 m (3,586 ft)
- Lowest elevation: 0 m (0 ft)
- Population (2023): 1,166
  - Density: 18.00/km^{2} (46.61/sq mi)
- Time zone: UTC+01:00 (CET)
  - Summer (DST): UTC+02:00 (CEST)
- INSEE/Postal code: 2B143 /20230
- ^{1} French Land Register data, which excludes lakes, ponds, glaciers > 1 km^{2} (0.386 sq mi or 247 acres) and river estuaries.

Linguizzetta is a commune in the Haute-Corse department of France on the island of Corsica.

== Population ==
Historical population
Year	Pop.	±% p.a.
1968	758	—
1975	1,053	+4.81%
1982	751	−4.71%
1990	755	+0.07%
1999	939	+2.45%
2007	1,015	+0.98%
2012	1,079	+1.23%
2017	1,107	+0.51%
2023	1,166	+0.87%
Source: INSEE

== See also ==
- Communes of the Haute-Corse department
- Tour de Bravone
