= List of waterbodies of Haute-Corse =

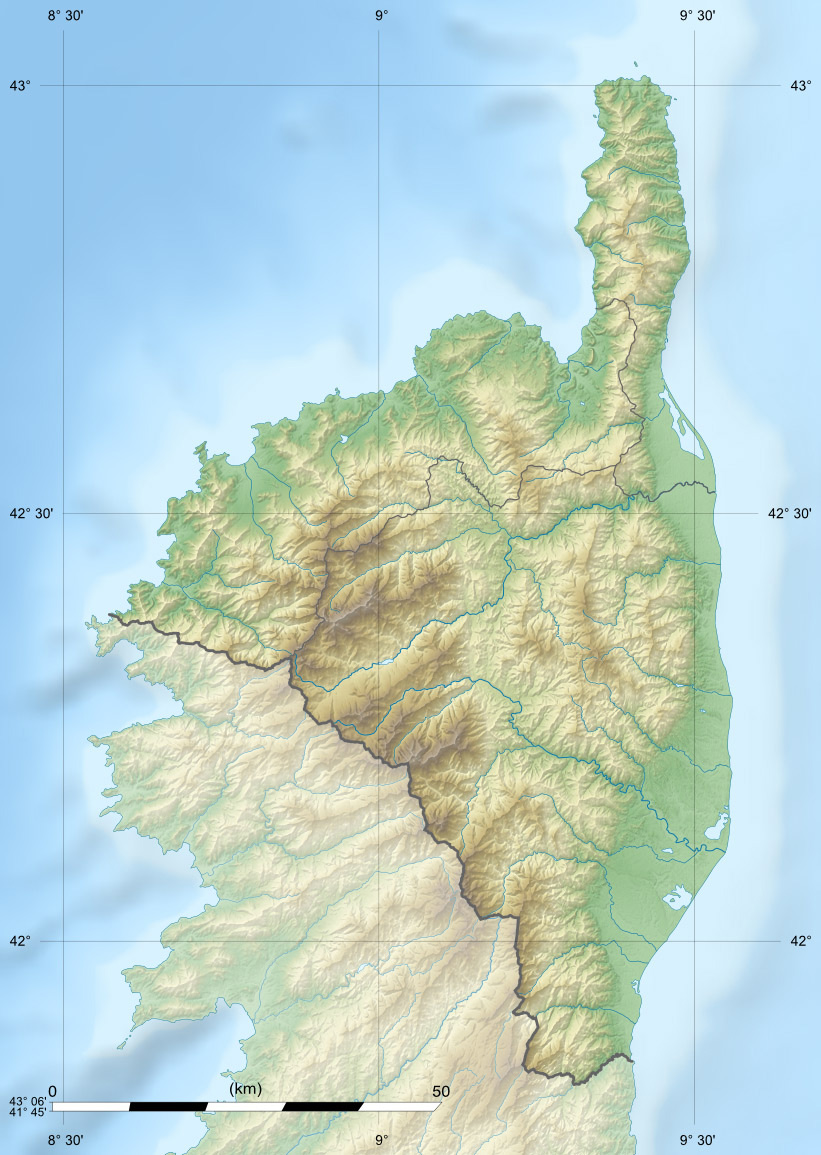
Haute-Corse

This list of waterbodies of Haute-Corse includes static bodies of water (lakes, reservoirs, coastal lagoons) and flowing bodies of water (rivers and streams) in the department of Haute-Corse on the island of Corsica.

== Static waterbodies ==
=== Natural lakes ===
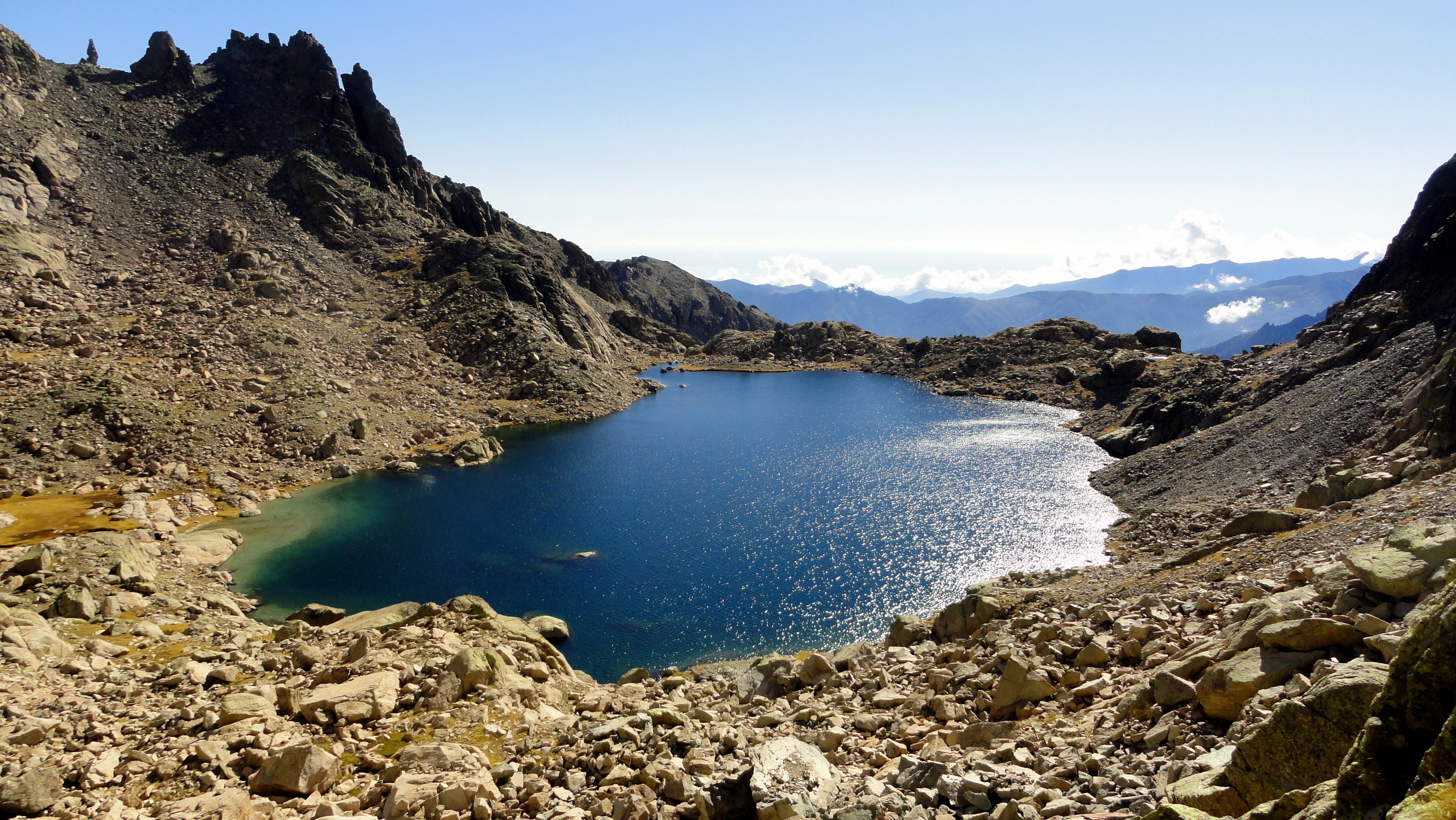
Lac de Bettaniella

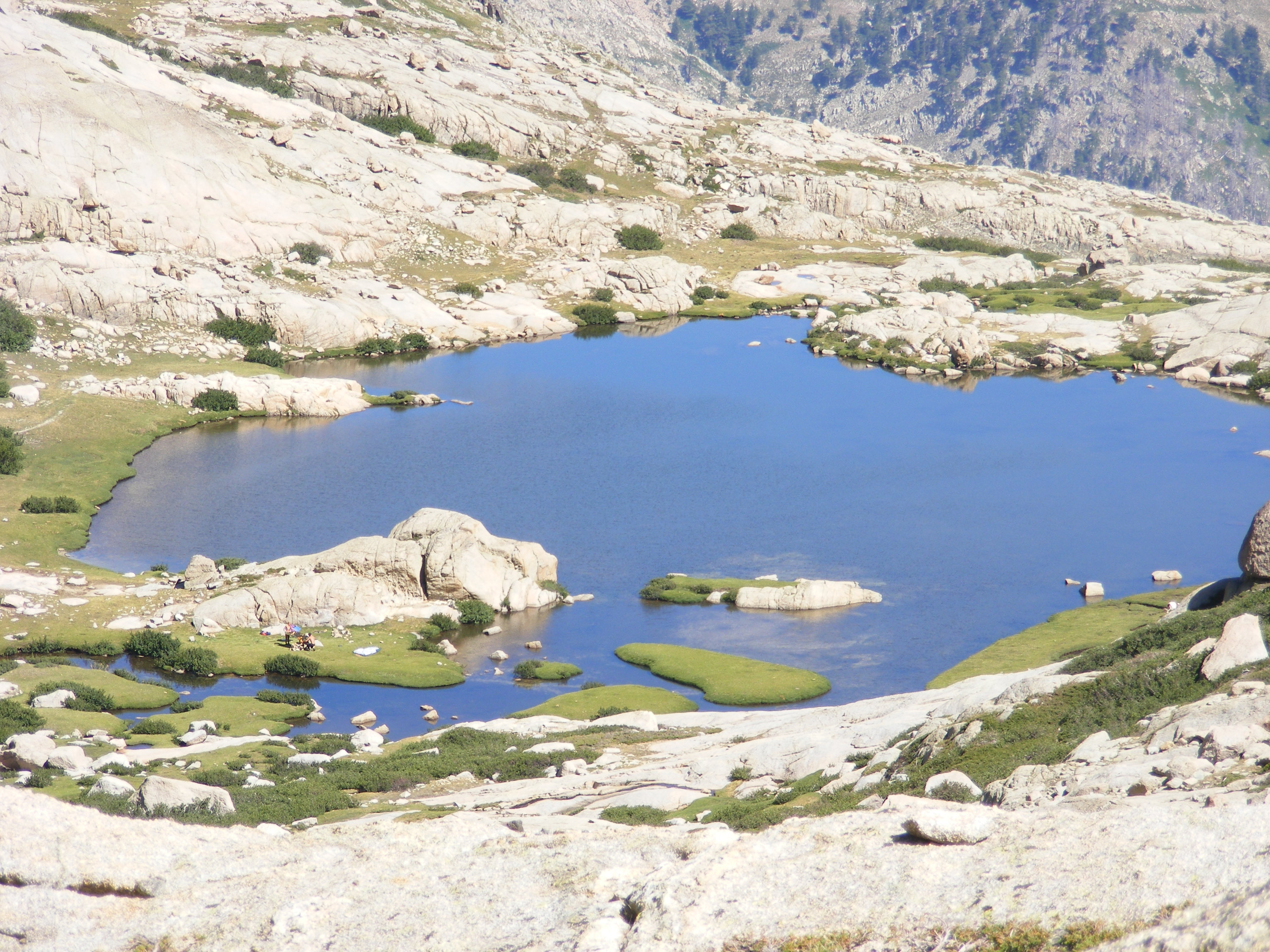
Lac de l'Oriente

Lakes in the Monte Cinto Massif include:

- Lac d'Argento (2,300 metres (7,500 ft))
- Lac du Ceppu (1,793 metres (5,883 ft))
- Lac du Cinto (2,289 metres (7,510 ft))
- Lac de Ghiarghe Rosse (2,175 metres (7,136 ft))
- Lac de Lancone Sottano (2,155 metres (7,070 ft))
- Lac Maggiore (2,267 metres (7,438 ft))
- Lac de la Muvrella (1,868 metres (6,129 ft))
- Lac d'Occhi Neri (2,165 metres (7,103 ft))
- Lac de la Paglia Orba (1,515 metres (4,970 ft))

Lakes in the Monte Rotondo Massif include:

- Lac de Bettaniella ou lac du Rotondo (2,321 metres (7,615 ft))
- Lac de Capitellu (1,930 metres (6,330 ft))
- Lac de Cavacciole (2,015 metres (6,611 ft))
- Lac de Galiera (2,442 metres (8,012 ft))
- Étang de Gialicatapiano (1,523 metres (4,997 ft))
- Lac de Goria (1,852 metres (6,076 ft))
- Lac de Lavigliolu (1,834 metres (6,017 ft))
- Lac de Melu (1,711 metres (5,614 ft))
- Lac de Nino (1,743 metres (5,719 ft))
- Lac de l'Oriente (2,061 metres (6,762 ft))
- Grand lac d'Oro (1,970 metres (6,460 ft))
- Petit lac d'Oro (1,563 metres (5,128 ft))
- Lac de Pozzolo (2,348 metres (7,703 ft))
- Grand lac de Rinoso (2,065 metres (6,775 ft))
- Petit lac de Rinoso (2,082 metres (6,831 ft))
- Lac de San Ciprianu (1,948 metres (6,391 ft))
- Lac de Scapuccioli (2,338 metres (7,671 ft))
- Lac de Soglia (1,870 metres (6,140 ft))
- Lac de Sorbi (2,060 metres (6,760 ft))

Lakes in the Monte Renoso Massif include:

- Lac d'Alzeta (1,690 metres (5,540 ft))
- Lac de Bastani (2,092 metres (6,864 ft))
- Lac de Nielluccio (1,919 metres (6,296 ft))
- Lac de Rina Soprano (1,882 metres (6,175 ft))
- Lac de Rina Sottano (1,806 metres (5,925 ft))

=== Artificial reservoirs ===
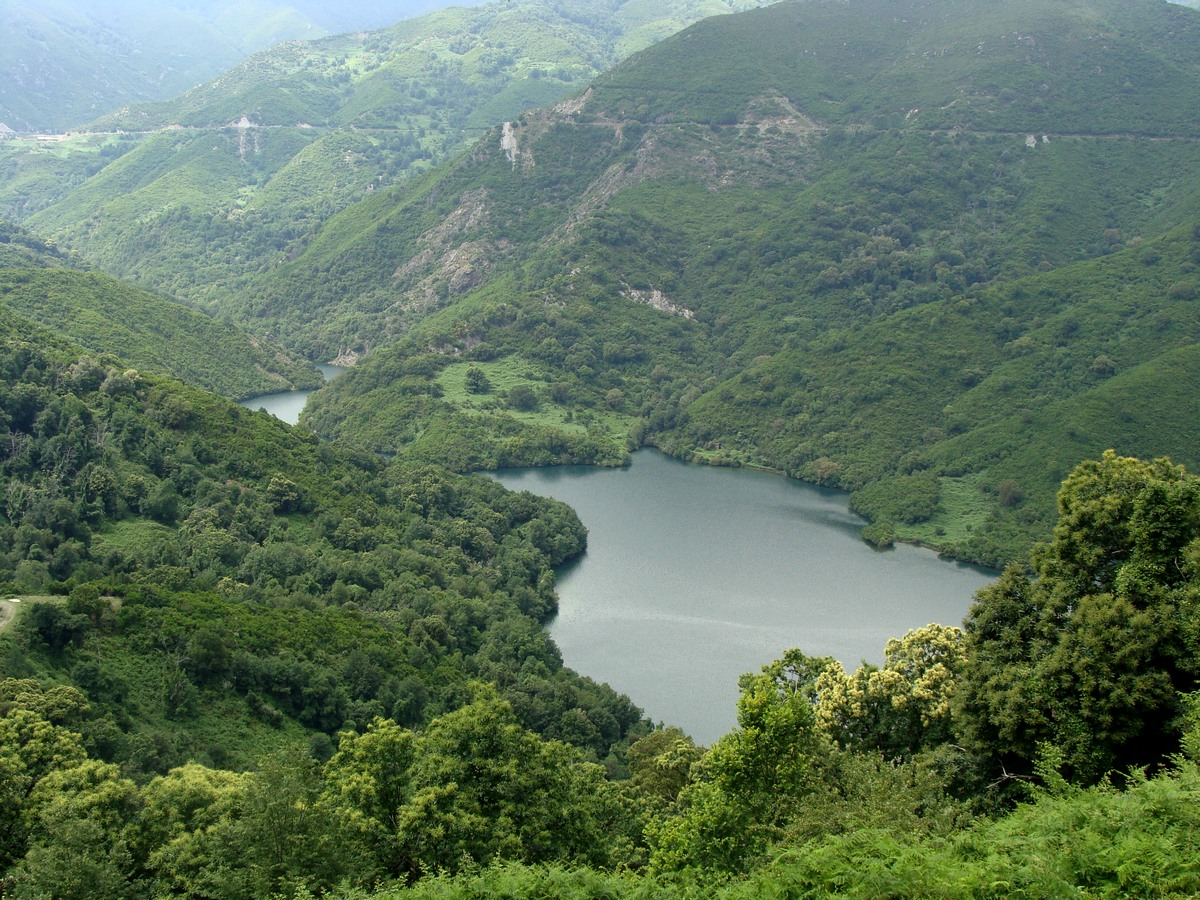
Alesani Reservoir

Artificial reservoirs built to store water for drinking, irrigation or hydroelectric power generation include:

- Alesani (147 metres (482 ft))
- Alzitone (62 metres (203 ft))
- Argentella (45 metres (148 ft))
- Bacciana (alt. 54 m)
- Calacuccia (793 metres (2,602 ft))
- Calca Tavulaghjiu (50 metres (160 ft))
- Codole (108 metres (354 ft))
- Corscia (673 m)
- Padula (60 metres (200 ft))
- Peri (76 metres (249 ft))
- Sampolo (365 metres (1,198 ft))
- Teppe Rosse (32 metres (105 ft))
- Trévadine (153 metres (502 ft))

=== Coastal lagoons ===
- Étang de Biguglia
- Étang de Crovani
- Étang de Diane
- Étang de Palo
- Étang del Sale
- Étang d'Urbino

== Rivers and streams ==
Rivers and streams (French: ruisseaux) in Haute-Corse are listed below in clockwise sequence, from west to north to east to south, with their main tributaries.

=== West coast ===
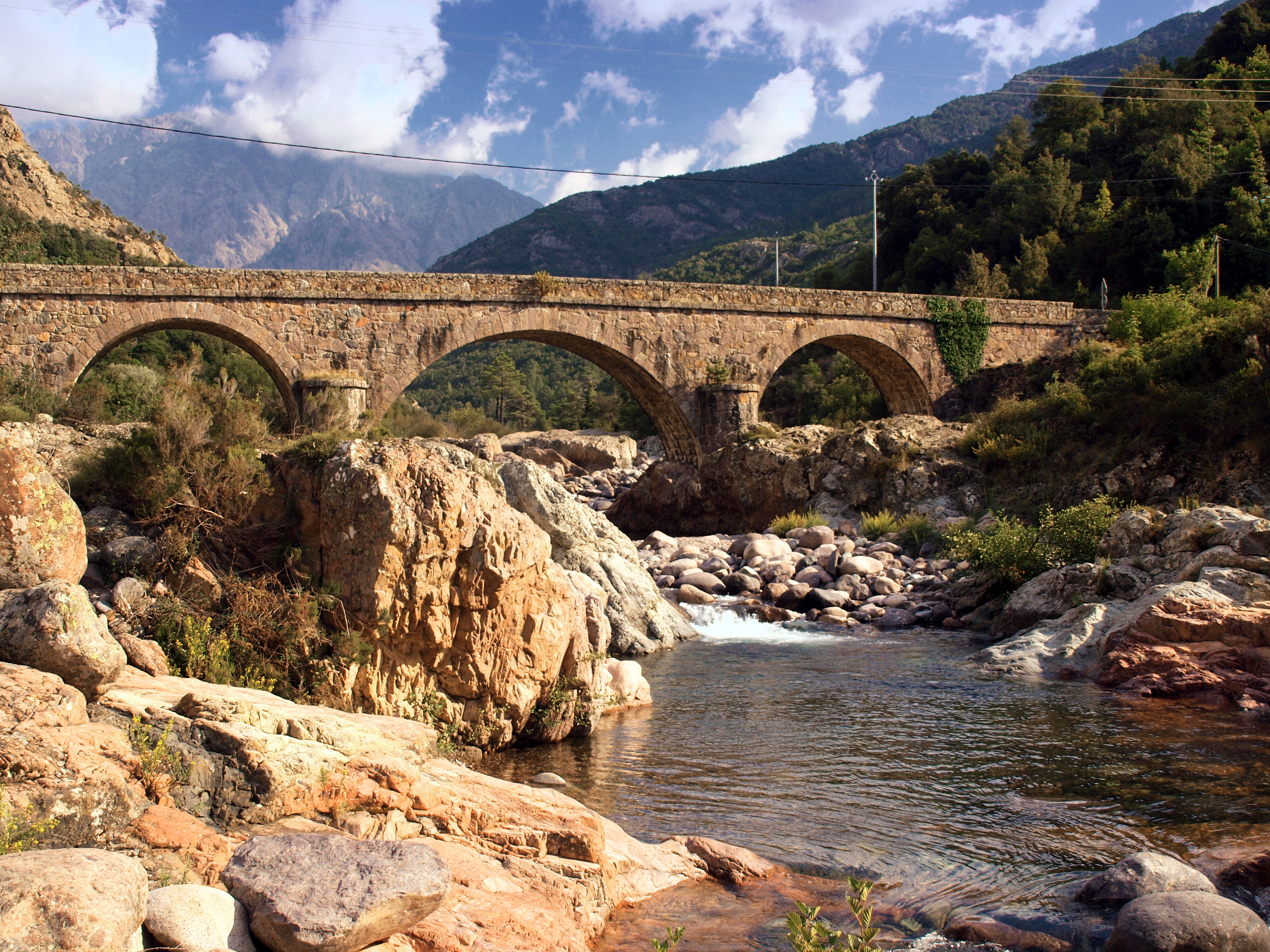
Fango: Pont de Manso

- Fango (22.72 kilometres (14.12 mi))
- Figarella
- Seccu
- Regino
- Ostriconi
- Liscu
- Santu
- Buggiu
- Aliso

=== Cap Corse ===
- Fium'Albino
- Olmeta
- Guadu Grande
- Acqua Tignese
- Luri
- Pietracorbara
- Sisco
- Poggiolo

=== East coast ===
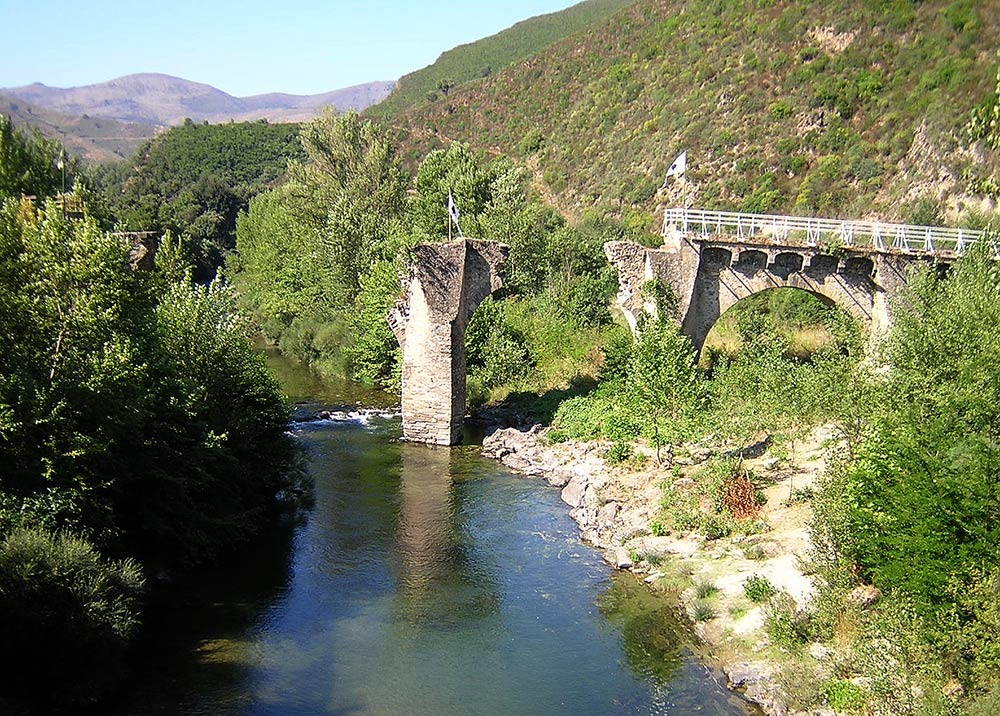
Old Golo bridge near Castello-di-Rostino

- Bevinco (31.23 km (19.41 mi))
- Golo (89.4 km (55.6 mi))
  - Asco
    - Tartagine
  - Casaluna
  - Erco
- Fium'Alto
- Buccatoggio
- Alesani
- Alistro
- Chiosura
- Bravone
- Tavignano (88.9 km (55.2 mi))
  - Corsiglièse
  - Restonica
  - Tagnone
  - Vecchio
- Fiumorbo (45.64 km (28.36 mi))
  - Saltaruccio
  - Varagno
- Abatesco (24.8 km (15.4 mi))
  - Aglia
- Travo
- Chiola
- Solenzara

== See also ==
- List of waterbodies of Corse-du-Sud
