= Chiola =

Stream in Haute-Corse, Corsica, France

- Location within Corsica Location within France

Location
- Country: France
- Region: Corsica
- Department: Haute-Corse

Physical characteristics
- Mouth: Tyrrhenian Sea
  - coordinates: 41.8864°N 9.4015°E

The Chiola (French: Ruisseau de Chiola) is a small coastal stream in the department of Haute-Corse, Corsica, France. It enters the Tyrrhenian Sea from the east of the island.

== Course ==
The Chiola is 11.63 kilometres (7.23 mi) long and flows through the commune of Solaro. It rises to the north of the 1,122 metres (3,681 ft) Punta Mozza and flows east-northeast, and then east, through the Foret Territoriale de Tova. It runs under the T10 coastal highway and enters the sea to the south of the Marine de Solaro resort. The Plage Chiola, a beach, extends south from the mouth of the stream. Its course is south of the Travo and north of the Solenzara.

== Tributaries ==
The following streams (ruisseaux) are tributaries of the Chiola (ordered by length):

- Arjaja: 2 km (1.2 mi)
- Capicoli: 2 km (1.2 mi)
- Petra Gialla: 2 km (1.2 mi)
- Ori: 2 km (1.2 mi)
- Licciola: 1 km (0.62 mi)

== Sources ==
- "Plage de Chiola à Solaro", plages.tv (in French)
- "Relation: Ruisseau de Chiola (8832071)", OpenStreetMap
- "Ruisseau de Chiola", Sandre (in French)
