= Fium'Albino =

River in the department of Haute-Corse, Corsica

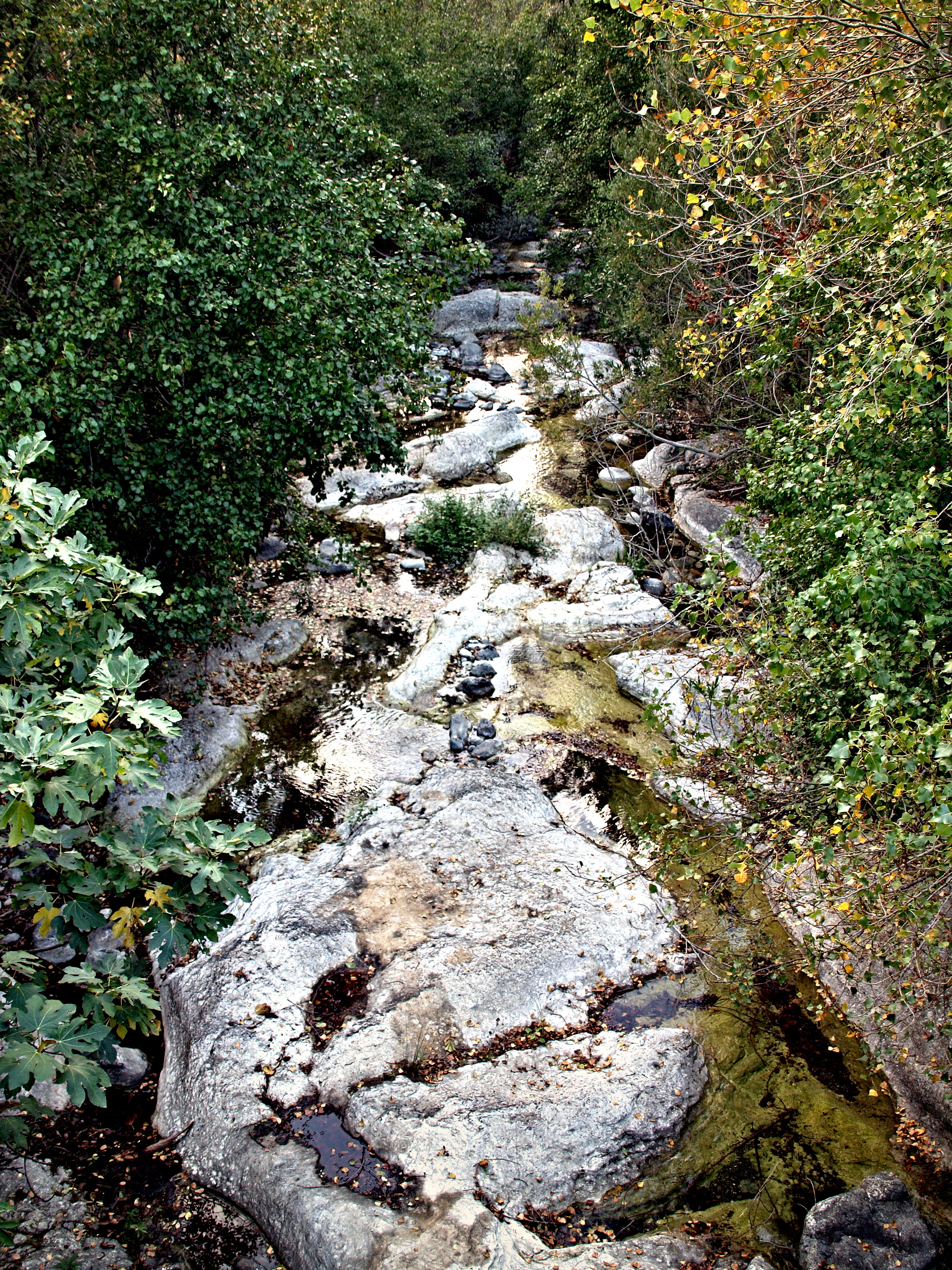
- Fium'Albino downstream of the Albino bridge from the D80 road

- Location within Corsica Location within France

Location
- Country: France
- Region: Corsica
- Department: Haute-Corse

Physical characteristics
- Mouth: Tyrrhenian Sea
  - coordinates: 42.7188°N 9.3302°E

The Fium'Albino is a small coastal river in the departments of Corse-du-Sud and Haute-Corse, Corsica, France. Its mouth opens into the Gulf of St Florent in the Mediterranean Sea on the west of the Cap Corse peninsula.

== Course ==
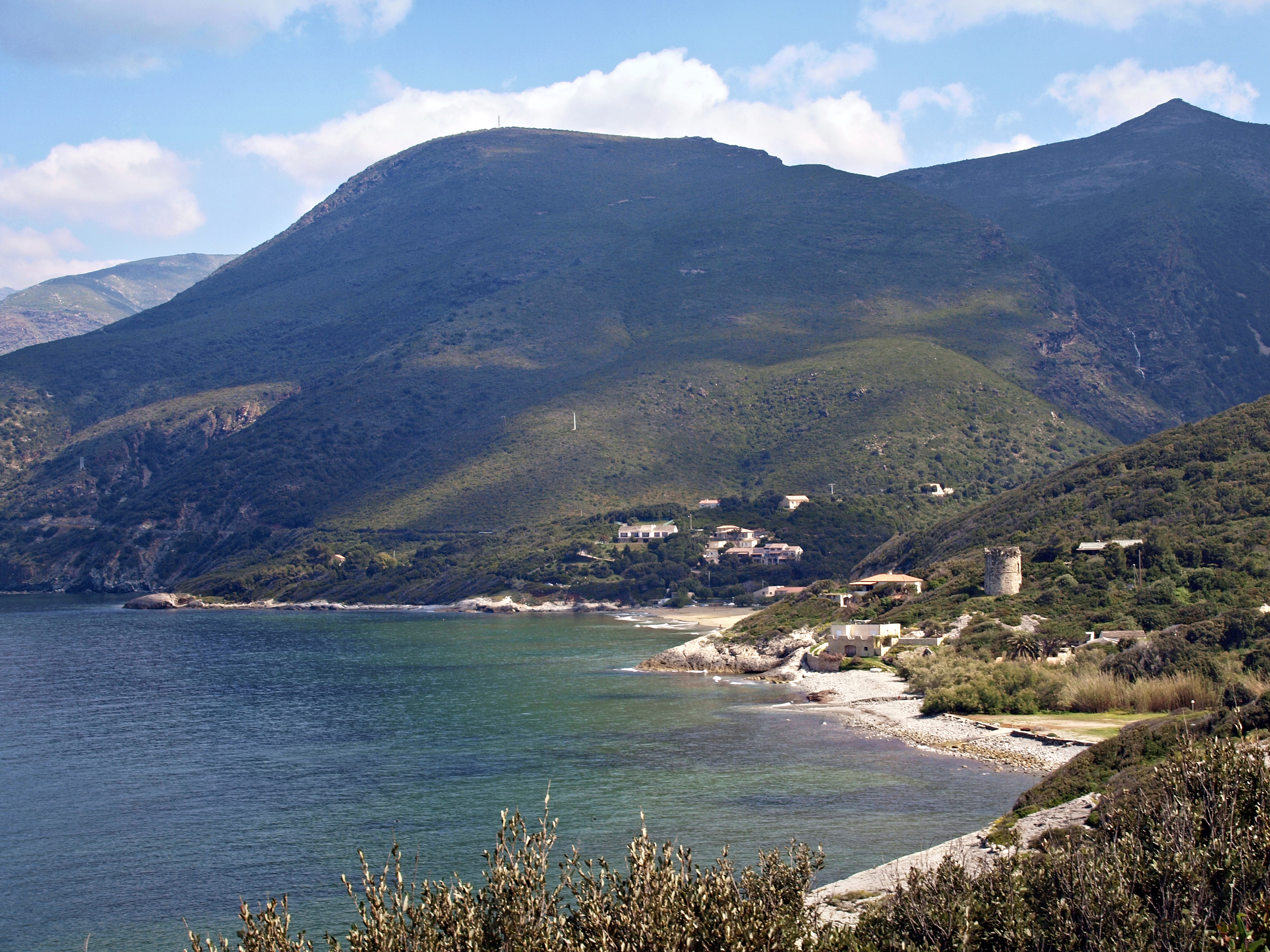
Coastline and mouth of Fium Albino

The Fium'Albino is 7.68 kilometres (4.77 mi) long. It crosses the communes of Farinole and Patrimonio. It forms from several streams that originate on the western slope of the ridge that forms the backbone of Cap Corse, and that meet to the east of the town of Patrimonio. The Ruiseau de Serpaio rises to the west of the 839 metres (2,753 ft) Monte San Columbano. It joins the Ruisseau di Monti Rossi to form the Fium'Albino. This flows in a generally southwest direction past the town of Patrimonio then northwest to enter the sea beside Punta di Saeta.

The Fium'Albino enters the Gulf of St-Laurent downstream from the Ponte Albino. From this point, a steep limestone ridge contains the south of the lower valley, and ends in the rocky headland Punta di Saeta. The Fium Albino flows intermittently, but downstream of the Ponte Albino it resembles a wadi with only seasonal surface runoff. In this section, the stream cuts through an old alluvial terrace made up of pebbles and blocks covered with a layer of finer alluvium. It has a pebble bed, and there are pebble beaches on both sides of its estuary, which is replaced by sand to the northeast.

== Geology ==
The river gives its name to the Fium Albino Formation, which outcrops in the Saint-Florent region and at Francardo. This was formed in the late early Miocene and early middle Miocene and consists of fluvial deposits of Alpine-derived detritus, with subordinate foreland-derived volcanic detritus. It is found in depressions cut by erosion into the underlying Nebbio nappe, and consists of pebble conglomerate and very coarse- to coarse-grained sandstone. The formation is found inland in a narrow strip that crosses the river from north to south. The lower course of the river runs through the Torra and Monte Sant'Angelo Formation, where carbonate intrabasinal detritus predominates. Above the Fium Albino Formation are rocks of the Late Carboniferous–Permian Volcanic Succession and finally Upper Schistes Lustrés in the higher land.

== Hydrology ==
Between 2012 and 2021, the river was observed between May and September from the RD333 bridge. Once in June and three times in August the river had dried up. Four more times in August or September there was no discernible flow.

== Environment ==
"Ponte Albino et abords" has been designated as a Zone naturelle d'intérêt écologique, faunistique et floristique (ZNIEFF). This includes the last part of the lower valley of Fium Albino and the limestone slope which overhangs it on the left (south) bank from Ponte Albino.

The natural vegetation of the edges of the watercourse includes wild garlic (Allium vineale), lavender-leaved anthyllis (Anthyllis hermanniae), Arabian pea (Bituminaria bituminosa), shrubby hare's-ear (Bupleurum fruticosum), thorny broom (Calicotome spinosa), pink rock-rose (Cistus creticus), Montpellier cistus (Cistus monspeliensis), fragrant virgin's bower (Clematis flammula), French lavender (Lavandula stoechas), honeysuckle (Lonicera implexa) and rosemary (Rosmarinus officinalis). In the downstream section, the riparian forest is mainly shrub. Further upstream, there are trees such as Italian alder (Alnus cordata), black poplar (populus nigra) and South European flowering ash (Fraxinus ornus).

In October 1981, Bogidiella cyrnensis, a new amphipoda species of the family Bogidiellidae was found in fine gravel and silt in the river bed under the D333 road bridge. The specific name cyrnensis refers to Cyrnos (Kûpvoç), the classical Greek name for Corsica.

== Tributaries ==
The following streams (ruisseaux) are tributaries of the Fium'Albino (ordered by length):

- Culaia 3 km (1.9 mi)
- Monti Rossi 2 km (1.2 mi)
- Porcilelli 2 km (1.2 mi)

== Sources ==
- Cavazza, William; DeCelles, Peter G.; Giuditta Fellin, Maria; Paganelli, Luigi (2007), "The Miocene Saint-Florent Basin in northern Corsica: stratigraphy, sedimentology, and tectonic implications" (PDF), Basin Research (19): 507–527, doi:10.1111/j.1365-2117.2007.00334.x
- "Fium'Albino", Sandre (in French)
- Hovenkamp, F.; Hovenkamp, W.; van der Heide, J.J. (1983), "Two new hyporheic amphipods, Bogidiella (Bogidiella) cyrnensis n. sp. and Bogidiella (Medigidiella?) paolii n. sp., from Corsica" (PDF), Bijdragen tot de Dierkunde, 53 (1): 82–92
- Le Fium Albino au pont de la RD 333 (in French), Office français de la biodiversité
- "Relation: Fium'Albino (9417789)", OpenStreetMap
- Teyssedre, Gilles (8 April 2013), Ponte Albino et abords (940031071) (PDF) (in French), Paris: INPN, SPN-MNHN, pp. 10 pages
