= Vecchio (river) =

River in the department of Haute-Corse, Corsica

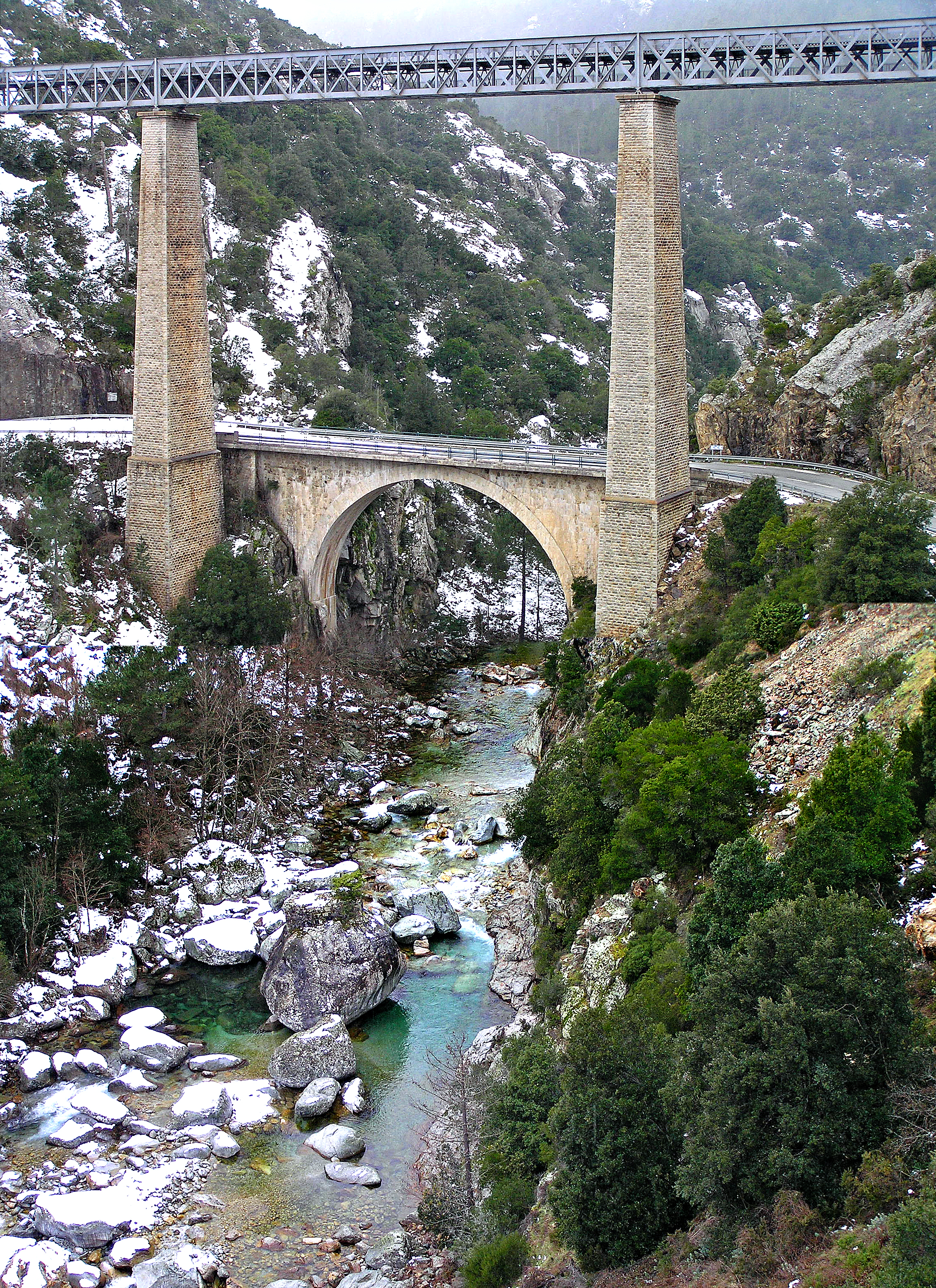
- Pont Eiffel on the Vecchio

- Location within Corsica Location within France
- Native name: U Vechju (Corsican)

Location
- Country: France
- Region: Corsica
- Department: Haute-Corse

Physical characteristics
- Mouth: Tavignano
  - coordinates: 42°13′40″N 9°14′43″E

Basin features
- Progression: Tavignano→ Tyrrhenian Sea

The Vecchio (Corsican: U Vechju) is a river in the department of Haute-Corse, Corsica, France. It is a tributary of the river Tavignano.

== Course ==
The Vecchio is 24.27 kilometres (15.08 mi) long. It crosses the communes of Muracciole, Noceta, Venaco and Vivario.

The Vecchio rises to the north of the 2,112 metres (6,929 ft) Punta dell'Oriente in the commune of Vivario. Its upper section is called the Ruisseau de Fulminato. It runs north or north-northeast through the Foret de Vizzavona past the village of Vizzavona to a point south of Santo-Pietro-di-Venaco where it turns to the east and flows to the Tavignano. For most of its upper course it is followed by the T20 road. After it turns east it is followed by the D143 road.

== Bridges ==
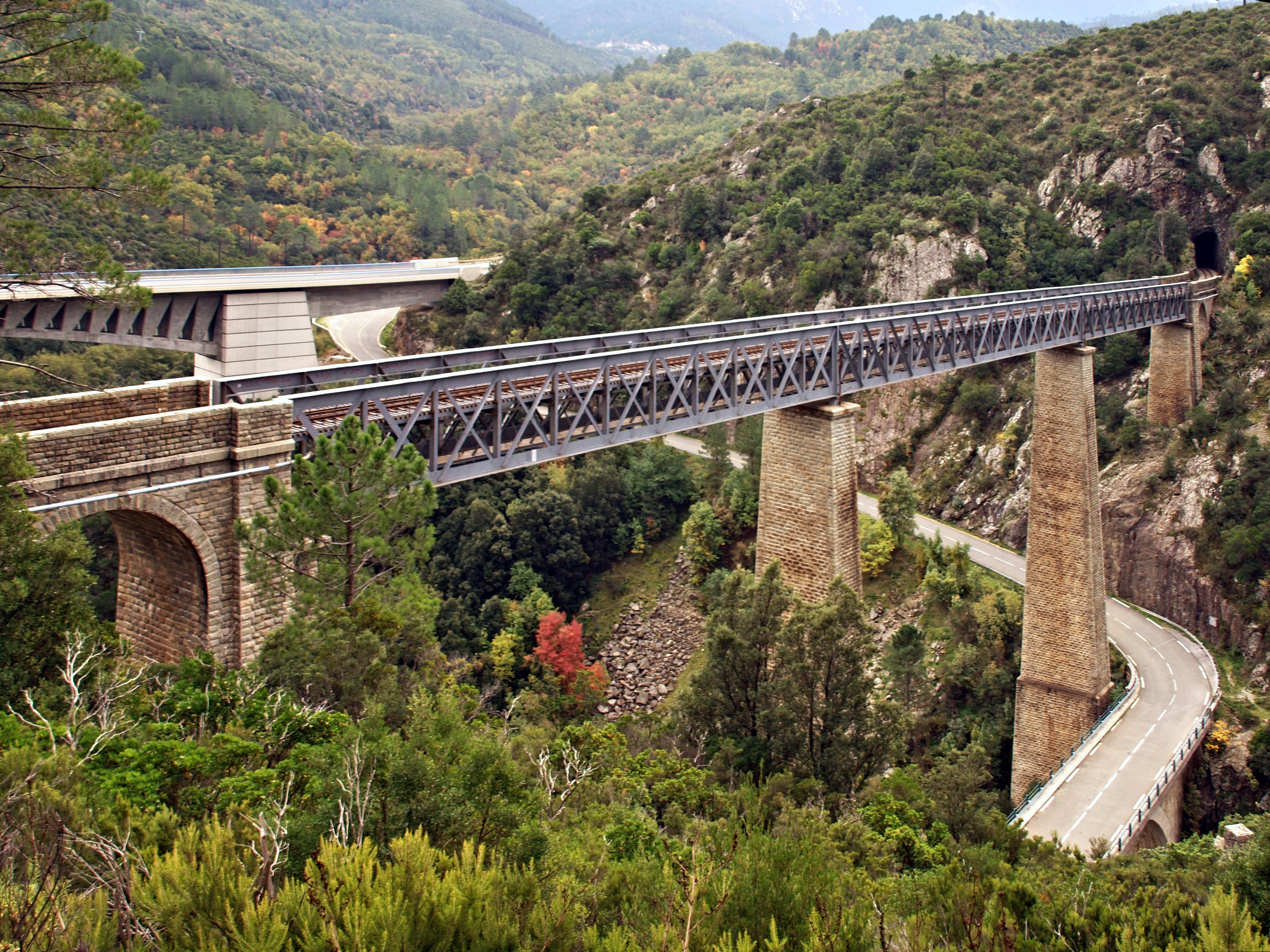
Three bridges: Eiffel bridge in foreground

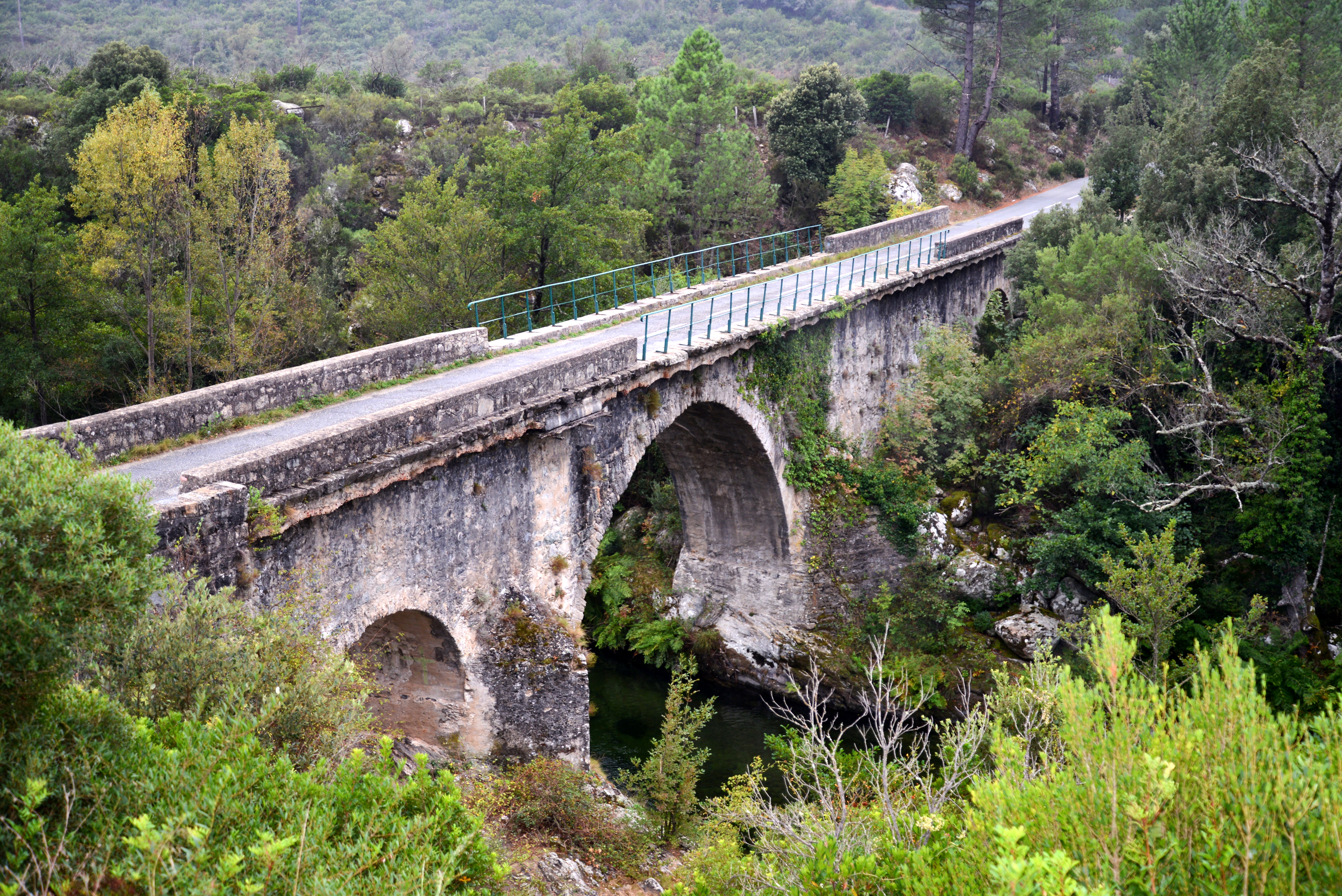
Noceta bridge

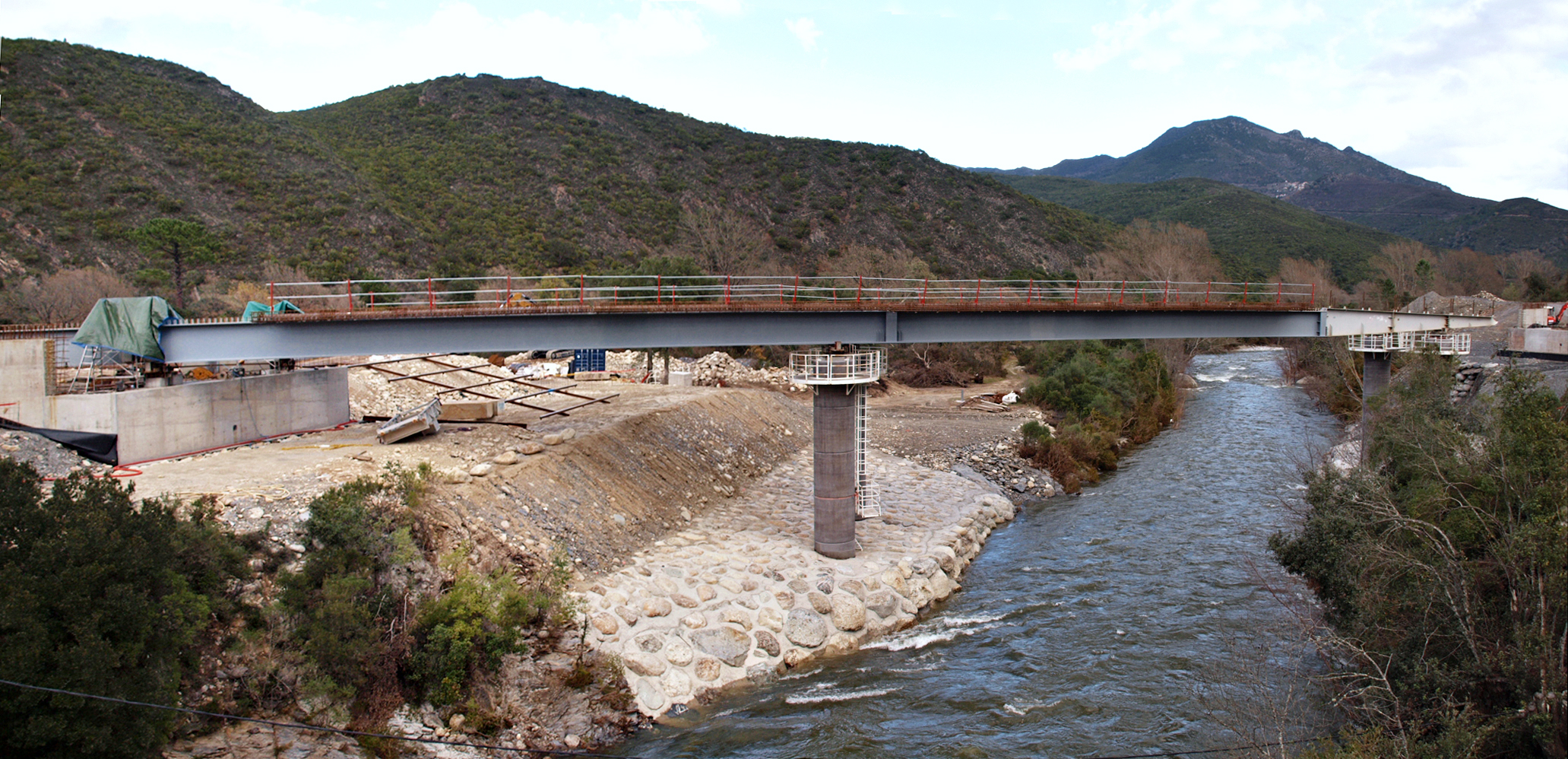
Ajiunta bridge

The viaduct over the Vecchio, or Eiffel bridge, in the commune of Vivario was built between 1891 and 1893 by Gustave Eiffel. It is a metal railway viaduct with three interdependent spans, running between abutments hollowed out by double arches and supported by two piers. The work was undertaken by the contractor Vignolle. The bridge was classified as a Monument historique on 29 July 1976.

The viaduct runs above the old road bridge on a loop of the RN 193 between Venaco and Vivario, built between 1826 and 1827. It was replaced by a new bridge in 1999 and is now only used by cyclists and pedestrians. The new bridge on the RN 193 is downstream from the old bridge, built between 1996 and 1999. Other bridges are:

- The Noceta bridge on the D43 road, 5 kilometres (3.1 mi) below the village of Noceta
- The Ajiunta bridge on the RT50, near the confluence of the Vecchio with the Tavignano, built in 2011-2012 to replace the old single-lane bridge.
- The Mulinello bridge in the town of Vivario on the D23 leading to the hamlet of Canaglia
- The Forest trail bridge in Vizzavona Forest, on the archaeological trail to the Southwell Vault.

== Hydrology ==
Measurements of the river flow were taken at the Venaco [Pont de Noceta] station from 1960 to 2021. The watershed above this station covers 147 square kilometres (57 sq mi). Annual precipitation was calculated as 1,061 millimetres (41.8 in). The average flow of water throughout the year was 4.93 cubic metres per second (174 cu ft/s).

Average flow (cubic meters per second) by month for the period 1979 to 1999
Month	Flow
Jan	6.850
Feb	7.220
Mar	7.370
Apr	7.760
May	6.420
Jun	2.780
Jul	0.924
Aug	0.542
Sep	1.080
Oct	3.280
Nov	6.770
Dec	8.310

== Tributaries ==
The following streams (ruisseaux) are tributaries of the Vecchio, ordered by length, and sub-tributaries:

- Manganello 11 kilometres (6.8 mi)
  - Meli 3 kilometres (1.9 mi)
  - Giargialiccia 2 kilometres (1.2 mi)
  - Grottacia 3 kilometres (1.9 mi)
    - Mazzola 1 kilometre (0.62 mi)
  - Busso 3 kilometres (1.9 mi)
  - Pantanelle 2 kilometres (1.2 mi)
  - Scalelli 1 kilometre (0.62 mi)
- Verjello 9 kilometres (5.6 mi)
  - Querceto 3 kilometres (1.9 mi)
  - Ondella 2 kilometres (1.2 mi)
  - Petra Rotta 1 kilometre (0.62 mi)
- Agnone river 7 kilometres (4.3 mi)
  - Tineta 3 kilometres (1.9 mi)
- Forcaticcio 6 kilometres (3.7 mi)
  - Larice 3 kilometres (1.9 mi)
- Cardiglione 6 kilometres (3.7 mi)
- Quarcigrosso 6 kilometres (3.7 mi)
- Piobico 5 kilometres (3.1 mi)
  - Monte Grosso 3 kilometres (1.9 mi)
- Granaja 4 kilometres (2.5 mi)
- Speloncello 3 kilometres (1.9 mi)
  - Basse di Speloncello 1 kilometre (0.62 mi)
- Omenino 3 kilometres (1.9 mi)
- Rio Secco 3 kilometres (1.9 mi)
- Spelonca 3 kilometres (1.9 mi)
- Chiarasola 2 kilometres (1.2 mi)
- Bagliacone 2 kilometres (1.2 mi)
- Gradule 2 kilometres (1.2 mi)
- Rossi 2 kilometres (1.2 mi)
- Avalanche de Fulminato 1 kilometre (0.62 mi)
- Ferletto 1 kilometre (0.62 mi)

== Sources ==
- "Le Vecchio à Venaco [Pont de Noceta]", eaufrance (in French), Ministère de l'Ecologie, du Développement Durable et de l'Energie
- "Le Vecchio", Sandre (in French)
- "Relation: Le Vecchio (8481495)", OpenStreetMap
- Viaduc sur le Vecchio ou pont Eiffel (in French), Ministry of Culture
