= Guadu Grande =

Stream in the department of Haute-Corse, Corsica

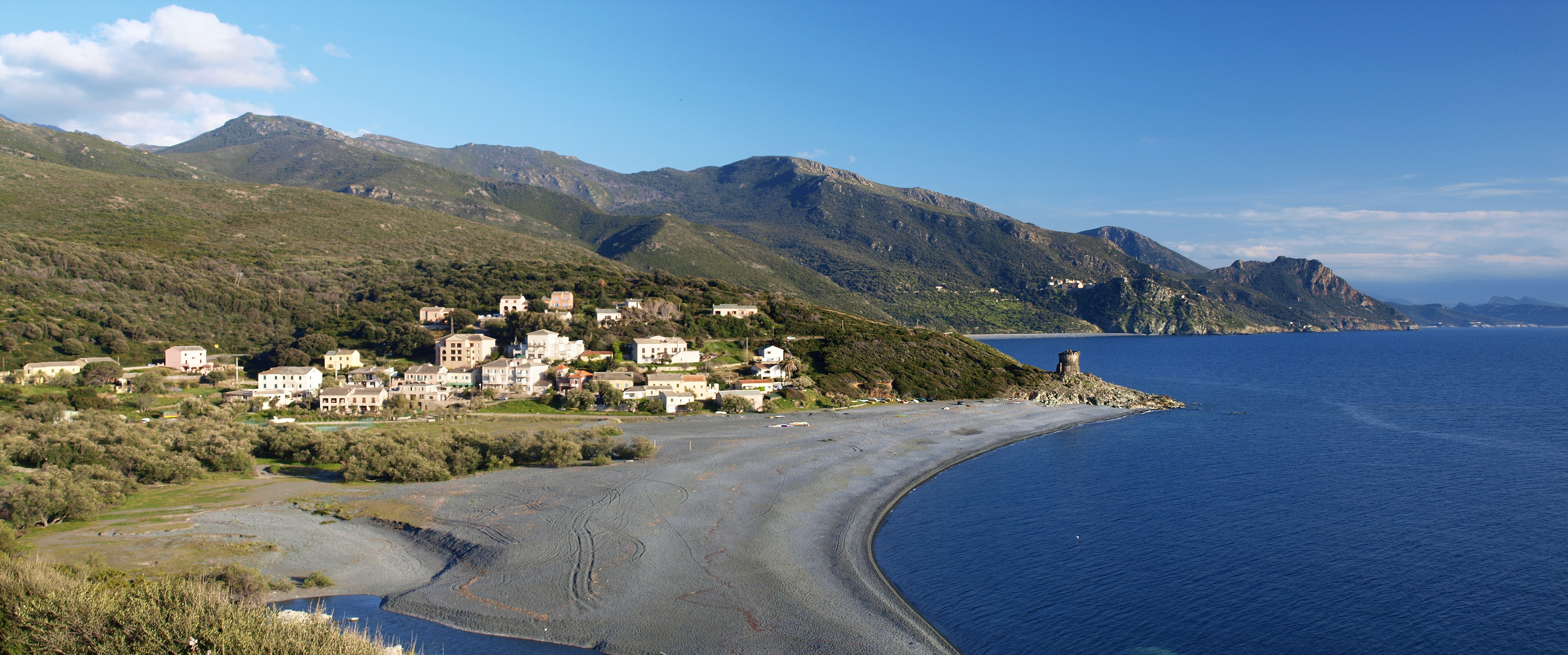
- Guadu Grande at its mouth in Albo marina. Nonza in rear.

- Location within Corsica Location within France
- Native name: U Guadu Grande (Corsican)

Location
- Country: France
- Region: Corsica
- Department: Haute-Corse

Physical characteristics
- Mouth: Mediterranean Sea
  - coordinates: 42.81126°N 9.3321°E

The Guadu Grande (Corsican: U Guadu Grande) is a small coastal stream in the department of Haute-Corse, Corsica, France. It enters the Mediterranean Sea from the west of the Cap Corse peninsula.

== Course ==
The Guadu Grande is 9.49 kilometres (5.90 mi) long and flows through the communes of Brando, Ogliastro and Olcani. It rises to the north of the 1,307 metres (4,288 ft) Monte Stello in the west of the commune of Brando. It flows in a generally northwest direction past the villages of Olcani and Ogliastro, then turns to the southwest and enters the sea at the north end of the beach of the Marine d'Albo. The last section of its course flows through a wetland, The Torra d'Albu stands at the south end of the beach. The D233 road follows the lower course of the river.

The lower part of the river valley and the Marine d'Albo have been designated a Zone naturelle d'intérêt écologique, faunistique et floristique (ZNIEFF) covering 15 hectares (37 acres). It includes the dunes and beach, the estuary, the river and the river banks. There is extensive grazing in the wetland downstream. The sides of the valley at the Marine d'Albo have been modified to allow walking near a parking area for motor homes, and a camping area is planned just upstream of the ZNIEFF, but there does not seem to be a large number of visitors.

== Tributaries ==
The following streams (ruisseaux) are tributaries of the Guadu Grande (ordered by length):

- Cetro: 4 km (2.5 mi)
- Alberghi: 3 km (1.9 mi)
- San Giuvanni: 3 km (1.9 mi)
- Cocolo: 3 km (1.9 mi)
- Immola: 2 km (1.2 mi)
- Terre Rosse: 2 km (1.2 mi)
- Olmu: 2 km (1.2 mi)
- Piedicanale: 2 km (1.2 mi)

== Sources ==
- "Relation: U Guadu Grande (9423063)", OpenStreetMap
- "u Guadu Grande", Sandre (in French)
- "ZNIEFF 940030886 Basse vallée du u Guadu Grande - Marine d'Albo", Inventaire national du patrimoine naturel (INPN) (in French), MNHN & OFB
