= Chiosura =

Stream in Haute-Corse, Corsica, France

- Location within Corsica Location within France

Location
- Country: France
- Region: Corsica
- Department: Haute-Corse

Physical characteristics
- Mouth: Tyrrhenian Sea
  - coordinates: 42.239°N 9.553°E

The Chiosura (French: Ruisseau de Chiosura) is a small coastal stream in the department of Haute-Corse, Corsica, France. It enters the Tyrrhenian Sea from the east of the island.

== Course ==
The Chiosura is 12.16 kilometres (7.56 mi) long and flows through the commune of Linguizzetta. It rises to the south of the 1,093 metres (3,586 ft) Pointe de Campana and to the north of the 1,012 metres (3,320 ft) Pointe de Mufuncello. It flows southeast past the village of Linguizzetta, passes under the T10 coastal highway, then turns north and flows through wet meadows (Marais de Chiosura) behind the beach before cutting across the beach to the sea.

== Wetland ==
The land around the lower part of the Chiosura, known as the Marais de Giustignana, has been classified as a Zone naturelle d'intérêt écologique, faunistique et floristique (ZNIEFF). It extends along the river on both sides of the T10 coastal highway, and along its Campo Vecchio and Bottari tributaries. The wetland occupies a depression in the coastal plain. It is mostly wooded with black alders 15 to 20 metres (49 to 66 ft) high rising among marsh irises, loosestrife, hops, willowherb and sedges. There are a few wet meadows to the east of the coastal road. The Chiosura drains the marsh, then runs for about 500 metres (1,600 ft) through a reed bed along a degraded sandy lido (coastal dunes) before entering the sea.

== Tributaries ==
The following streams (ruisseaux) are tributaries of the Chiosura (ordered by length) and sub-tributaries:

- Campo Vecchio: 6 km (3.7 mi)
  - Bottari: 3 km (1.9 mi)
- Farinaccio: 5 km (3.1 mi)
- Sculimerda: 2 km (1.2 mi)

== Sources ==
- 940004081 Marais de Giustignana (in French), INPN
- "Relation: Ruisseau de Chiosura (8832337)", OpenStreetMap
- "Ruisseau de Chiosura", Sandre (in French)
- "ZNIEFF 940004081 Marais de Giustignana", Inventaire national du patrimoine naturel (INPN) (in French), MNHN & OFB
