= Lac de Calca Tavulaghjiu =

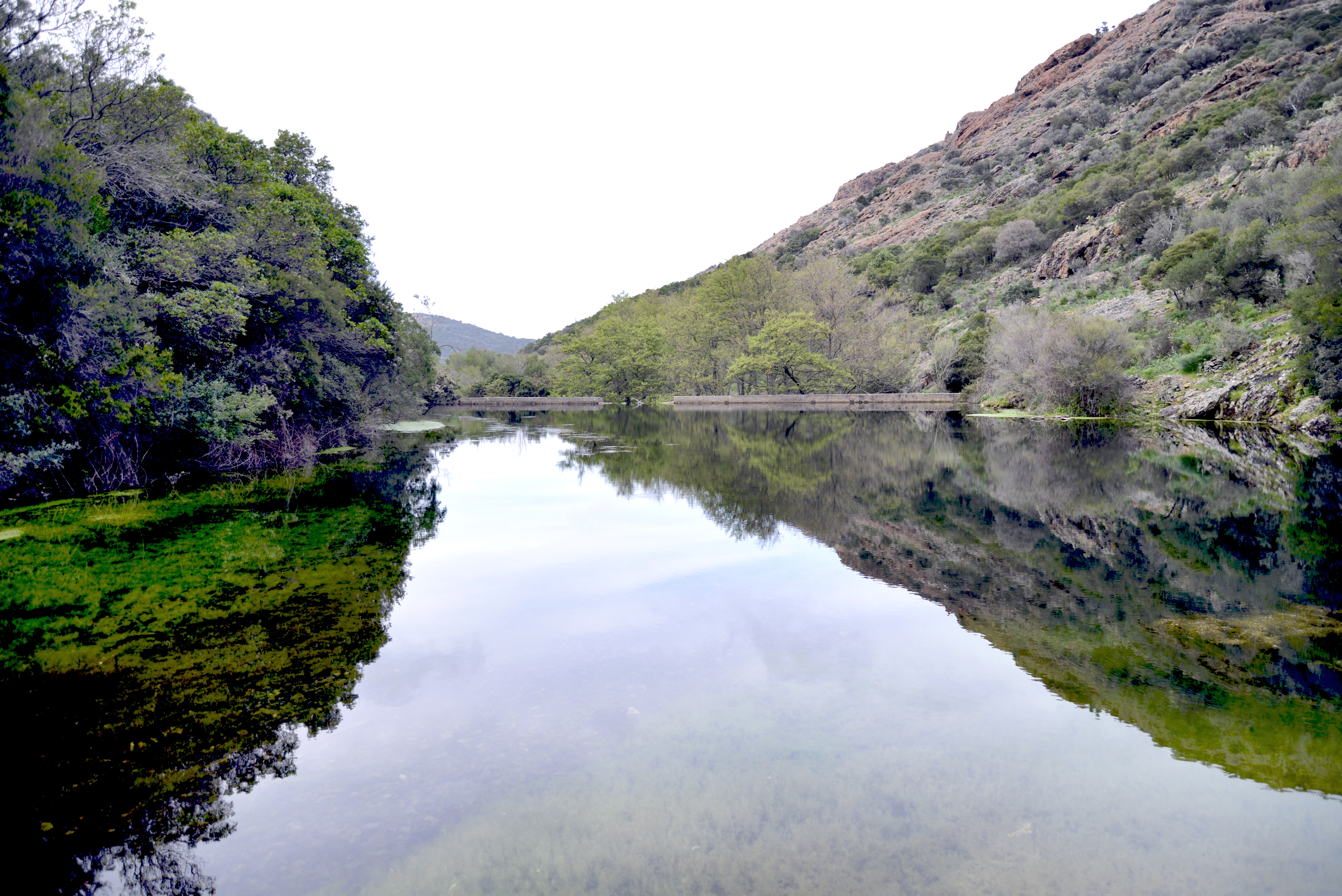
- Dam of Calca Tavulaghjiu

- Location within Corsica Location within France
- Location: Corsica
- Coordinates: 42°23′52″N 8°38′41″E
- Type: Reservoir
- Primary inflows: Ruisseau de Tavulaghjiu
- Primary outflows: Ruisseau de Tavulaghjiu
- Basin countries: France
- Surface area: 0.19 ha (0.47 acres)
- Surface elevation: 50 m (160 ft)

Lac de Calca Tavulaghjiu is a reservoir in the Haute-Corse department of France.

== Location ==
The reservoir is formed by a gravity dam on the Ruisseau de Tavulaghiu. This is a 5.06 kilometres (3.14 mi) stream that flows north through the commune of Galéria to enter the Mediterranean sea in the village of Galéria.

== History ==
The dam was built to supply the village with water during the summer seasons. The outlet at the base of the structure brought water to the village by a pipeline running along the steep right bank of the stream. This required masonry work to support the conduit along the rock face, as well as construction of a small aqueduct on arrival in the village. These walls serve as a path.

The dam was no longer needed for municipal water after two reservoirs were built at an altitude of 100 metres (330 ft) on the northern flanks of the "Scopa Femmine" in the small massif of Capu Tondu (839 metres (2,753 ft)) to the south-east of the village. Subacquatic flora and fauna have thus developed. Protected species include European pond turtles (Emys orbicularis), and the shallow waters around the edge of the reservoir hold watercress and many common frogs.

The dam is an obstacle to the flow of water and prevents fish going upstream. Its outlet is near the center of the dike. Except in the dry period, the overflow forms a waterfall about ten meters high.

== Gallery ==
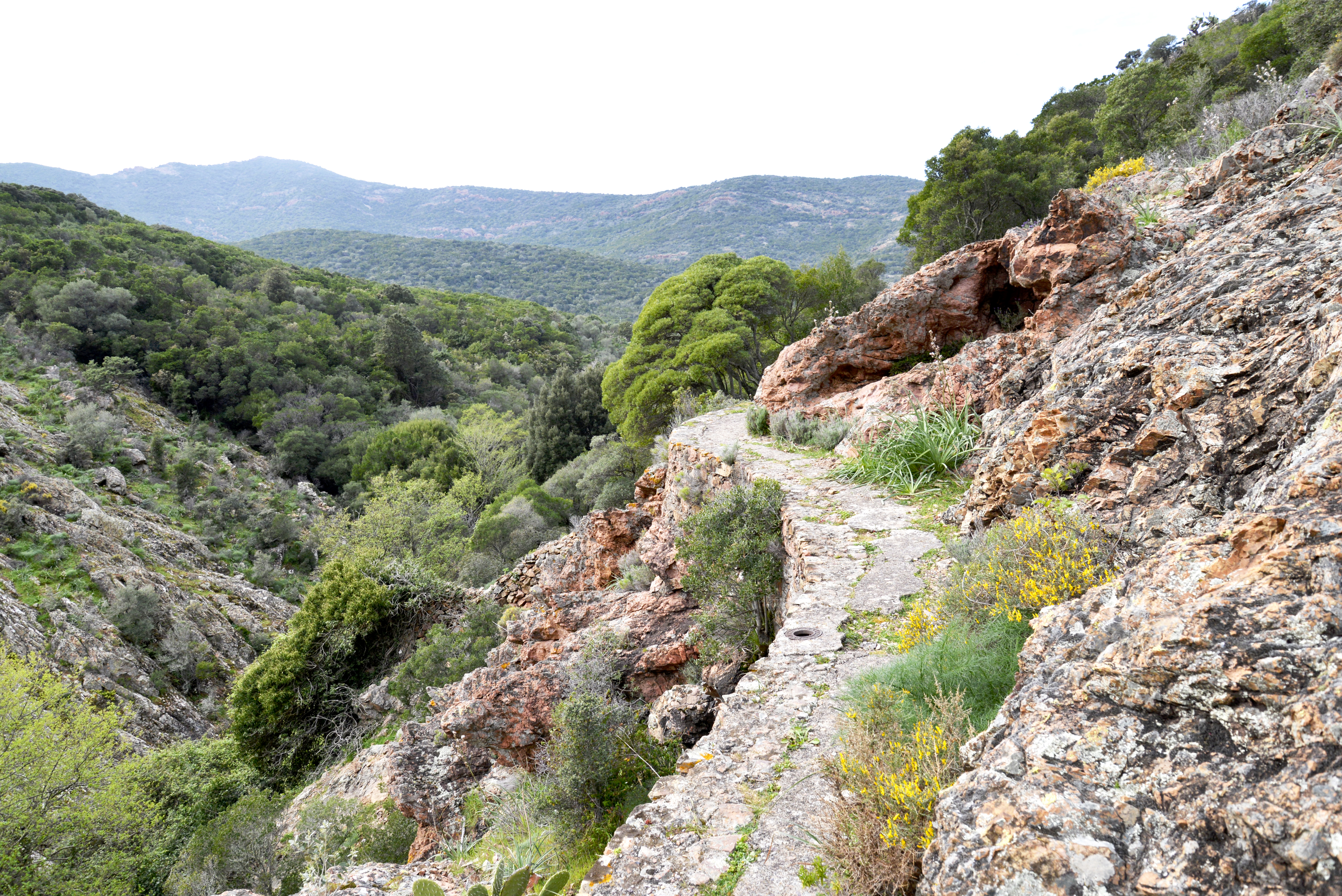
Access path to the dam

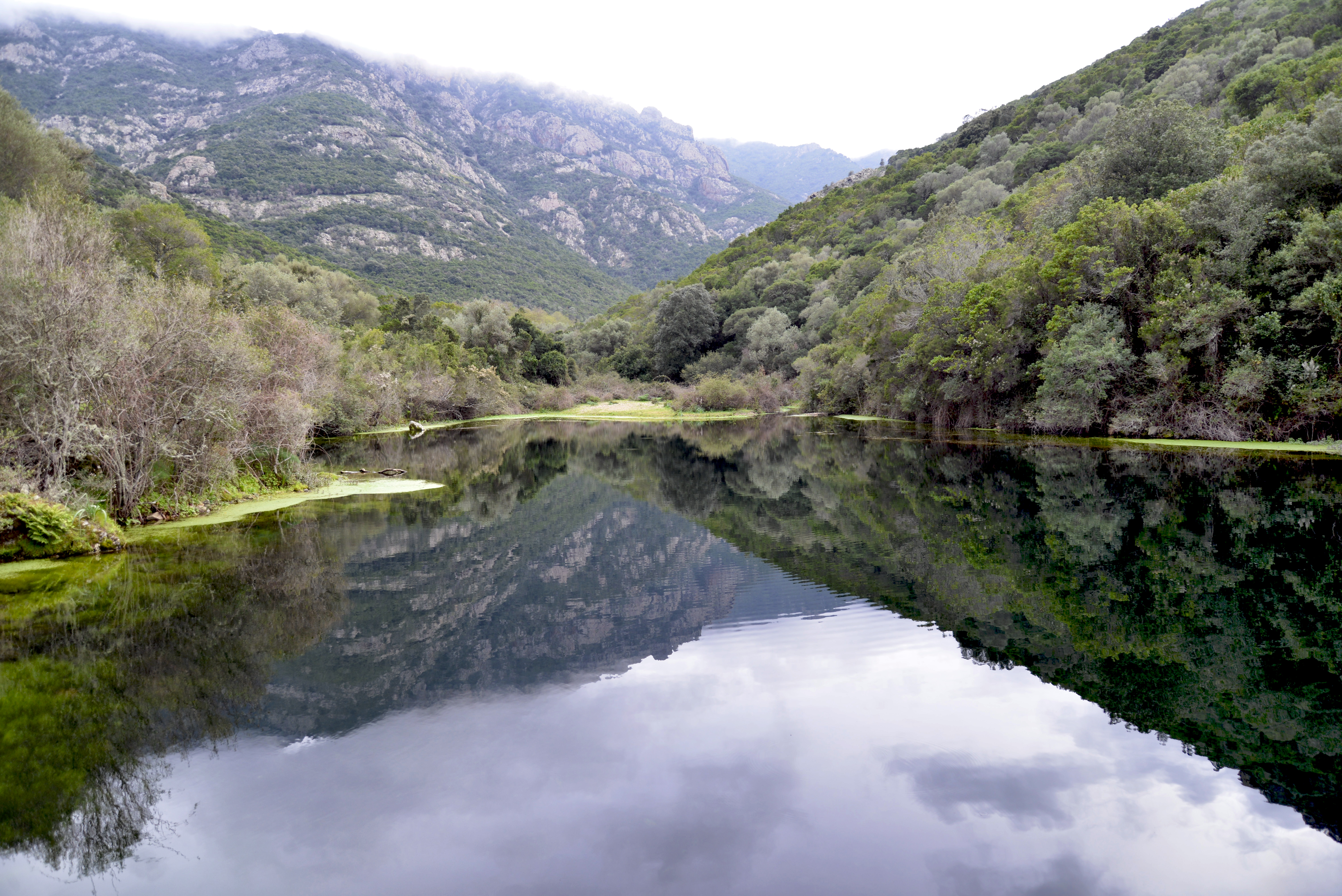
View of the lake looking upstream

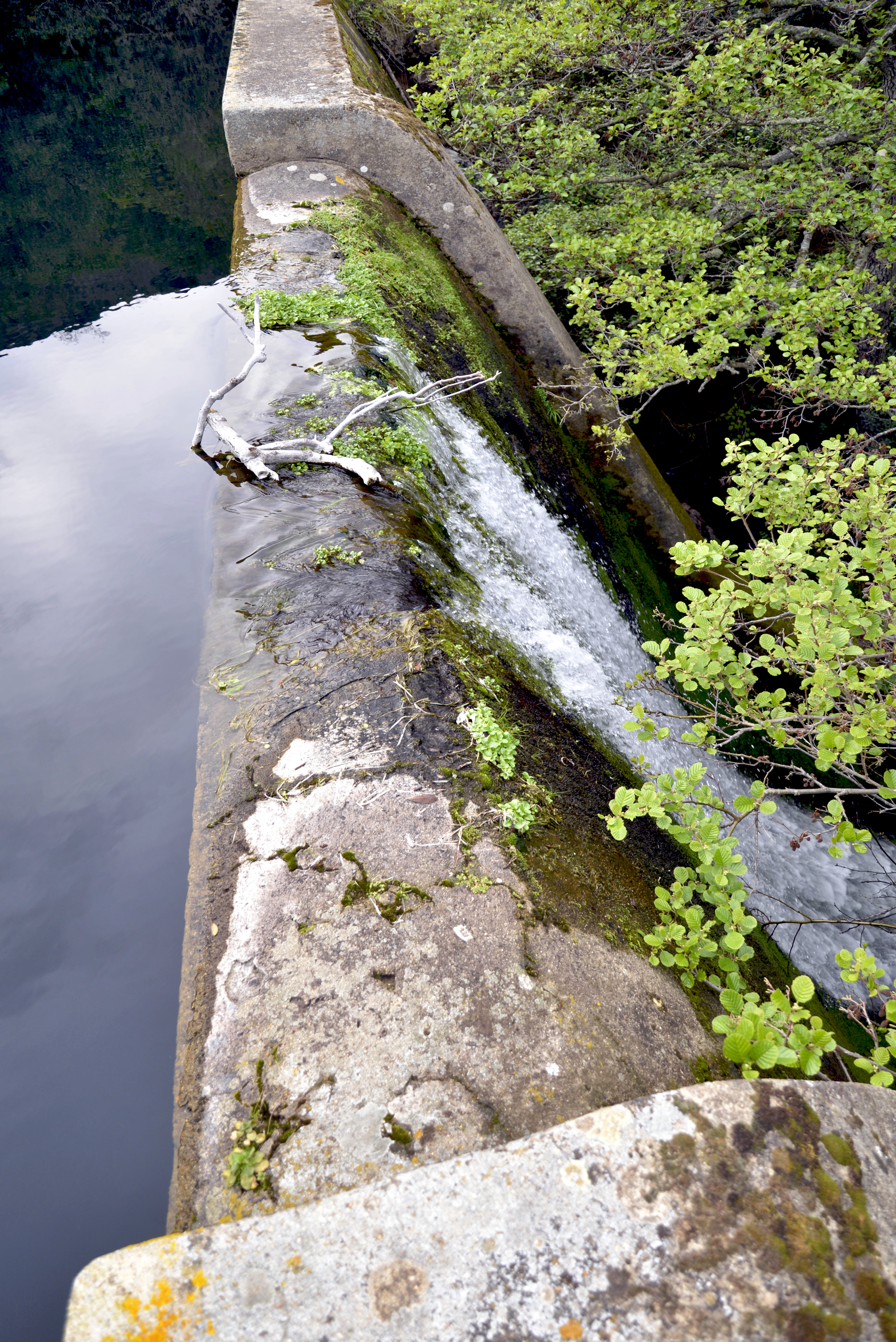
Exit of the Ruisseau de Tavulaghiu

== Sources ==
- "Ruisseau de Tavulaghiu", Sandre (in French)
- "barrage de Calca Tavulaghjiu", Sandre (in French)
- "Way: Lac de Calca Tavulaghjiu (499464609)", OpenStreetMap
