= Liscu =

Stream in the department of Haute-Corse, Corsica

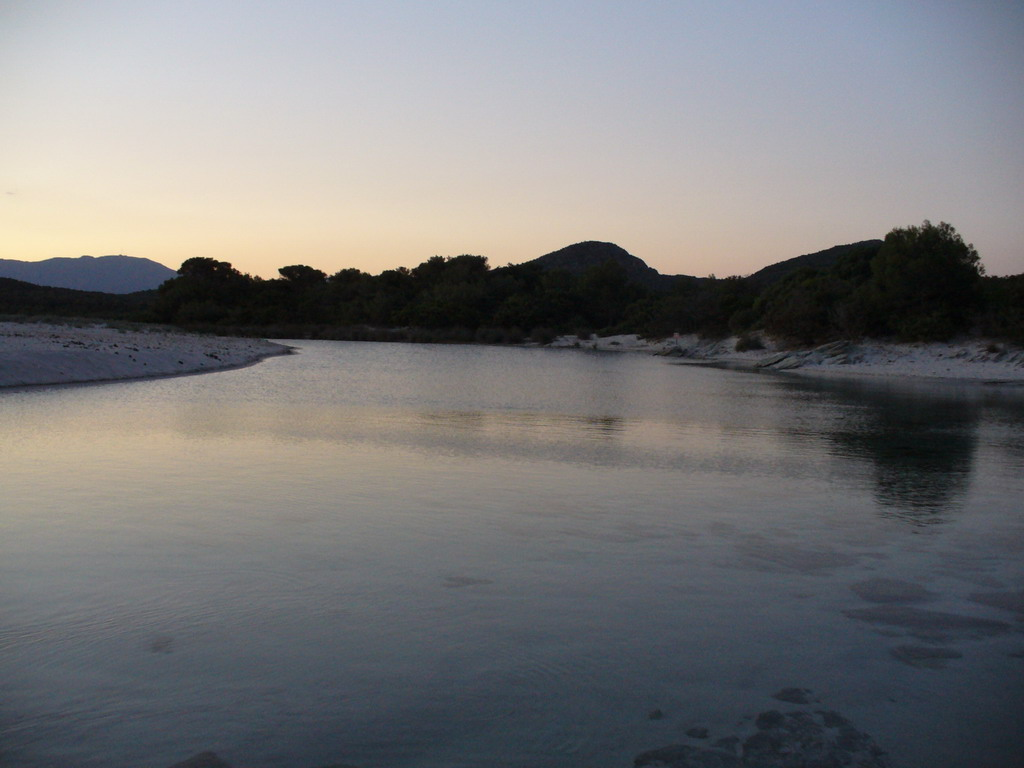
- Saleccia and the Padulella Marshes

- Location within Corsica Location within France

Location
- Country: France
- Region: Corsica
- Department: Haute-Corse

Physical characteristics
- Mouth: Mediterranean Sea
  - coordinates: 42.725°N 9.1987°E
- Length: 10.66 kilometres (6.62 mi)

The Liscu (French: Rivière Le Liscu)) is a small coastal river in the north of the department of Haute-Corse, Corsica, France.

== Course ==
The Liscu is 10.66 kilometres (6.62 mi) long. It crosses the commune of Santo-Pietro-di-Tenda. Its source is at an altitude of 304 metres (997 ft). The Ruisseau de Monti Rossi, as it is called in its upper section, rises to the north of the 311 metres (1,020 ft) Bocca di Vezzu and flows in a generally northeast direction. It is marshy in its lower course. Near the coast it turns north and flows through the Marais de Pardinella and Marais du Padulella, wetlands, before turned west and entering the sea at the west end of the Plage de Saleccia, a beach.

== Region ==
The Liscu river separates the western and eastern halves of the Agriates Desert. This is a region of marshes, maquis shrubland and forests between the Serra di Tenda mountain range and the Mediterranean Sea. The western part has small, rounded mountains, while the eastern part is less rugged, mainly composed of granite rocks. Some parts of the eastern part are cultivated.

== Saleccia-Loto wetland ==
The Saleccia-Loto wetland (Zone humide de Saleccia-Loto) is a large wetland around the lower Liscu River that is classified as a Zone naturelle d'intérêt écologique, faunistique et floristique (ZNIEFF). It contains several marshes and ponds between Saleccia beach to the west, and Loto beach to the east:

- Saleccia beach is a long sandy beach bordered by large dunes holding Aleppo pines and junipers grow.
- The mouth of the Liscu forms the Padullella marsh behind the Saleccia dunes. It drains to the sea intermittently. The marsh has a maximum depth of about 1 metre (3 ft 3 in).
- The Pardinella swamp is a depression further upstream, connected to the Liscu. It is covered with aquatic vegetation such as bulrushes and rushes, and has no open water.
- The Cannuta swamp is a depression to the east of the Pardinella swamp, which is probably flooded by fresh water in connection with the other two marshes.
- The Loto lagoon (Étang du Loto) is a shallow lagoon further east behind the Loto beach that receives some water from its immediate watershed and some via a channel from the Cannuta swamp.
- The Panecalellu lagoon (Étang de Panecalellu) is a shallow temporary lagoon behind the Loto beach few by a small stream.

A sample of sediments at 27 stations around the coast of Corsica reported in 2006 found the lowest level of silt at the Liscu station, and the lowest level of total organic carbon.

== Tributaries ==
The following streams (ruisseaux) are tributaries of the Liscu, ordered by length, and sub-tributaries:

- Piergolacciu: 9 km (5.6 mi)
  - Laculaia: 4 km (2.5 mi)
  - Terrazzole: 4 km (2.5 mi)
    - Ravin de Baccialu: 1 km (0.62 mi)
  - Rosaiola: 2 km (1.2 mi)
  - Ormelli: 1 km (0.62 mi)
- Peru Mansu: 3 km (1.9 mi)
  - Gremma: 2 km (1.2 mi)
- Venzaru: 2 km (1.2 mi)
- Costa Secca: 2 km (1.2 mi)
- Saleccia: 2 km (1.2 mi)
  - Sincasaccie: 1 km (0.62 mi)
- Penterubbiu: 1 km (0.62 mi)
  - Cacciatori: 2 km (1.2 mi)
- Catrea: 1 km (0.62 mi)
- Fontana Buona: 1 km (0.62 mi)
- Prunalbu: 1 km (0.62 mi)
- Caru: 1 km (0.62 mi)

== Sources ==
- Galgani, F.; Chiffoleau, J.F.; Orsoni, V.; Costantini, L.; Boissery, P.; Calendini, S.; Andral, B. (August 2006), "Chemical contamination and sediment toxicity along the coast of Corsica", Chemistry and Ecology, 22 (4), Taylor & Francis: 299–312, doi:10.1080/02757540600812156, S2CID 54603359
- Le "désert" des Agriates (in French), Corsica Linea
- "Le Liscu", Sandre (in French)
- "Relation: Le Liscu (9415641)", OpenStreetMap (in French)
- "ZNIEFF 940004073 Zone humide de Saleccia-Loto", Inventaire national du patrimoine naturel (INPN) (in French), MNHN & OFB
