= Seccu =

Stream in the department of Haute-Corse, Corsica

Seccu River
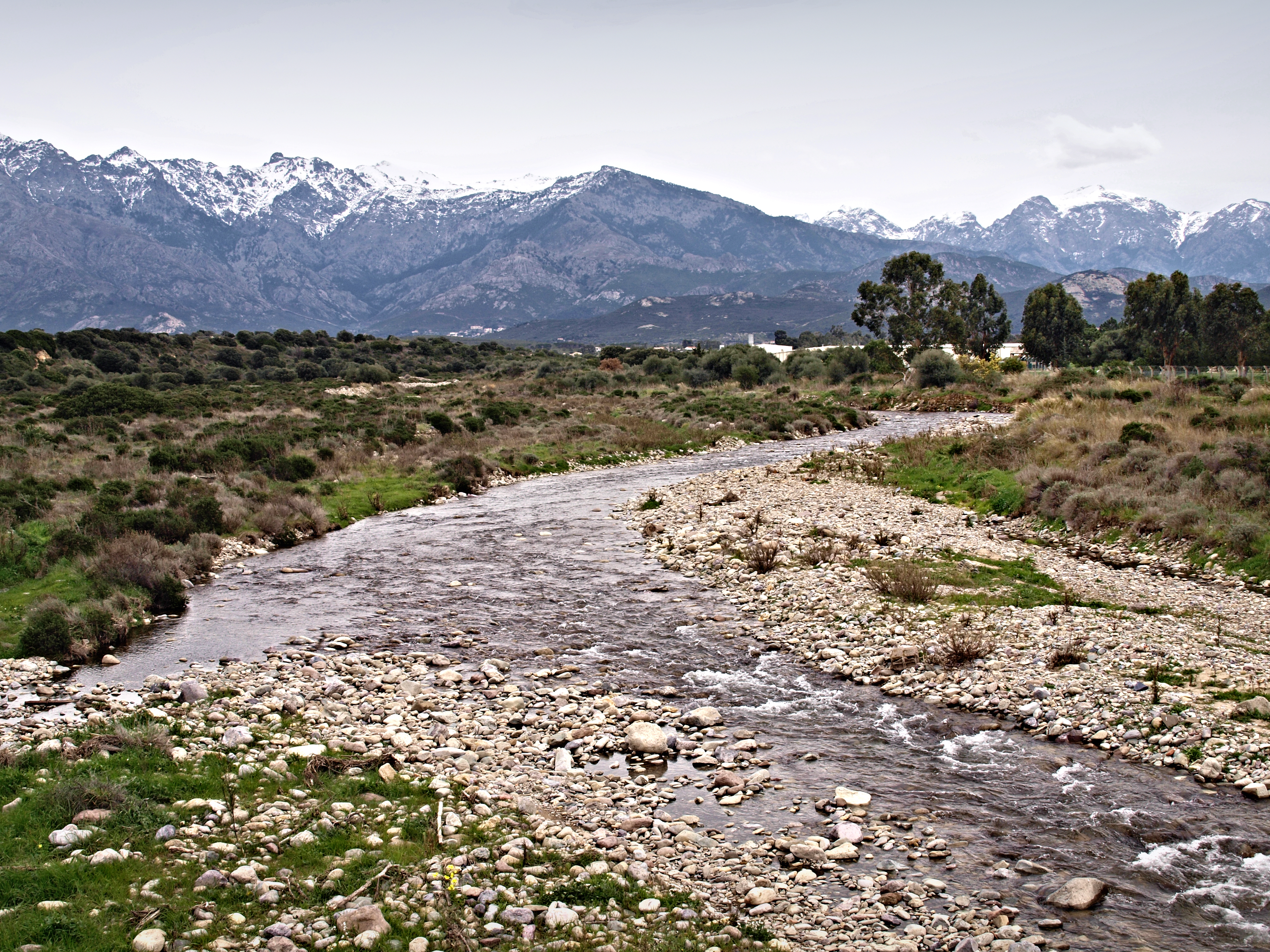

- Location within Corsica Location within France
- Native name: Fiume Seccu (Corsican)

Location
- Country: France
- Region: Corsica
- Department: Haute-Corse

Physical characteristics
- Mouth: Mediterranean Sea
  - coordinates: 42.56673°N 8.79999°E
- Length: 15.75 kilometres (9.79 mi)

The Seccu River (Corsican: Fiume Seccu) is a small coastal river in the department of Haute-Corse, Corsica, France.

== Course ==
The Seccu is 15.75 kilometres (9.79 mi) long. It crosses the communes of Calenzana, Lumio and Montegrosso. It rises in the commune of Calenzana to the south of the 1,937 metres (6,355 ft) Monte Grosso. At first it flows southwest, but then flows in a generally northwest direction to enter the sea in the Golfe de Calvi.

== Human impacts ==
In the late 19th century the decline in agriculture led to croplands and pasture being replaced by wild undergrowth and woods, which reduced the amount of erosion and run-off. This in turn led to less sediment being carried to the mouth of the river. In the 1970s in-channel gravel mining began in the river. The gravel pit traps sediment, and has caused braided channels to be replaced by a single channel. An alder forest colonized the gravel pit, trapping most of the sand from the watershed and creating a flood risk. Downstream, the result has been erosion of the beach, which started in the 19th century and is likely to continue for several decades, destroying a tourist attraction.

The area around the mouth of the river has been designated a ZNIEFF covering 44 hectares (110 acres) to the northeast of Camp Raffalli. The area is very vulnerable to damage by tourists and the local population, who have created tracks, paths and parking lots. This has caused deterioration of the environment and landscape, and has disturbed waterbirds during their nesting and migration period.

== Tributaries ==
The following streams (ruisseaux) are tributaries of the Seccu, ordered by length, and sub-tributaries:

- Canapile: 6 km (3.7 mi)
  - Caparone: 3 km (1.9 mi)
  - Falasca: 1 km (0.62 mi)
  - Pastricciola: 1 km (0.62 mi)
- Ponte: 4 km (2.5 mi)
  - Lette: 5 km (3.1 mi)
    - Teghia: 4 km (2.5 mi)
      - Tributoio: 2 km (1.2 mi)
    - Maria: 3 km (1.9 mi)
  - Bucignogni: 3 km (1.9 mi)
  - Caldaje: 2 km (1.2 mi)
  - Canale: 2 km (1.2 mi)
  - Mezzanu: 1 km (0.62 mi)
- Riu: 4 km (2.5 mi)
- Rotta Longa: 3 km (1.9 mi)
- Spavravelli: 2 km (1.2 mi)
- Figa Mara: 2 km (1.2 mi)
- Aghioa: 1 km (0.62 mi)
- Curagliette: 1 km (0.62 mi)
- Meu: 1 km (0.62 mi)
- Manganu: 1 km (0.62 mi)

== Sources ==
- Gaillot, S.; Piégay, H. (Summer 1999), "Impact of Gravel-Mining on Stream Channel and Coastal Sediment Supply: Example of the Calvi Bay in Corsica (France)", Journal of Coastal Research, 15 (3), Coastal Education & Research Foundation, Inc.: 774–788
- "Relation: Ruisseau u Fiume Seccu (8734680)", OpenStreetMap
- "Ruisseau u Fiume Seccu", Sandre
- "ZNIEFF 940013127 Embouchure du Fiume Secco", Inventaire national du patrimoine naturel (INPN) (in French), MNHN & OFB
