= Alzitone Reservoir =

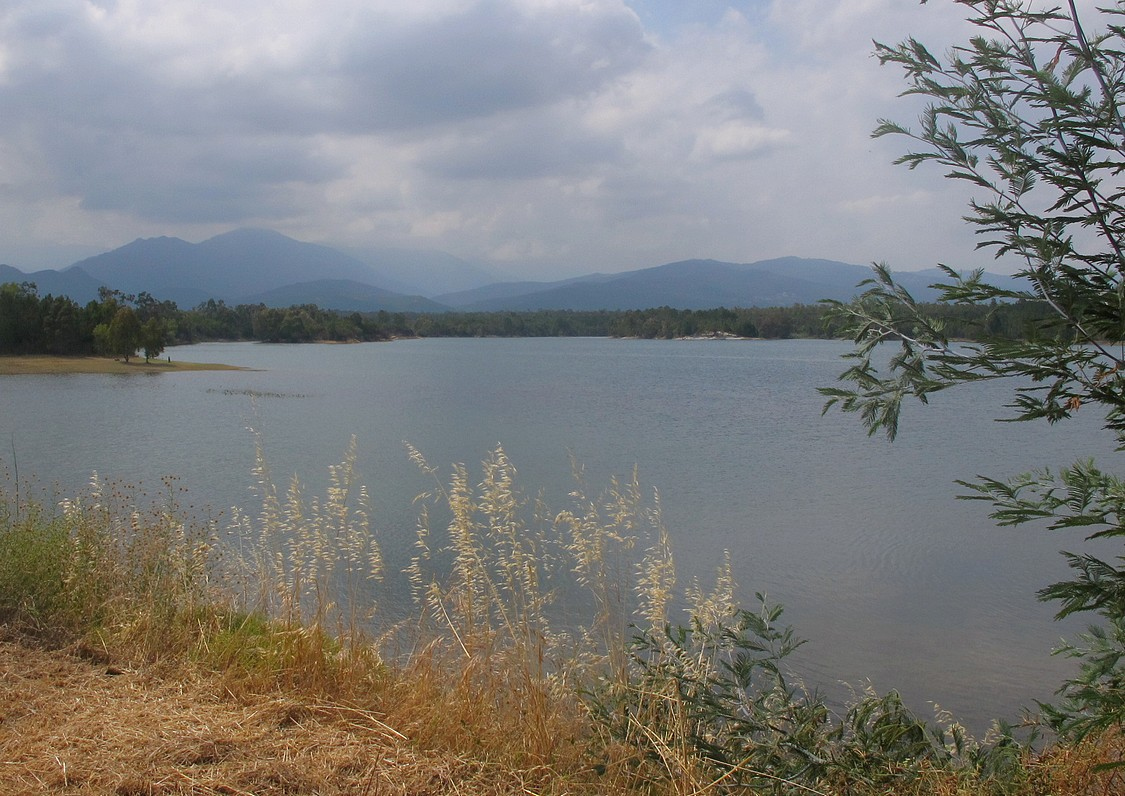
- Alzitone reservoir seen from near the dam, looking west

- Location within Corsica Location within France
- Location: Corsica
- Coordinates: 42.06896°N 9.42813°E
- Type: Reservoir
- Primary inflows: Pedocchino
- Primary outflows: Pedocchino
- Basin countries: France
- Surface area: 49 ha (120 acres)
- Surface elevation: 62.5 m (205 ft)

The Alzitone Reservoir (French: Réservoir d'Alzitone, Retenue d'Alzitone) is a reservoir in the Haute-Corse department of France. It dams the Pedocchino stream, but most of the water is supplied from the Réservoir de Trévadine on the Fiumorbo river. It supplies water for drinking and for irrigation, which during the summer low water is delivered using a pumping station.

== Location ==
The reservoir is in the eastern coastal plain of Corsica. It is in the south of the commune of Aghione to the north of the T10 Route de Bastia. The Étang d'Urbino is on the opposite side of the highway. The reservoir is surrounded by a communal forest with very accessible paths. From the crest of the dam, there is an excellent view of the coast and the Tyrrhenian Sea.

== Dam ==
The Alzitone Dam (French: Barrage d'Alzitone) is owned and operated by the Office d’Equipement Hydraulique de Corse. It came into service in 1965, and supplies drinking and irrigation water. It is an earth dam 32.3 metres (106 ft) high and 307 metres (1,007 ft) long. The crest altitude is 62.5 metres (205 ft). The dam impounds the Pedocchino stream to form a 49 hectares (120 acres) reservoir holding 5,600,000 cubic metres (200,000,000 cu ft) of water. Excluding the feed from the Fium'Orbu, the drainage basin covert just 2.5 square kilometres (0.97 sq mi).

== Ecology ==
The Alzitone Reservoir has low biological importance. Flora include silver wattle (Acacia dealbata), southern blue gum (Eucalyptus globulus) and common reed (Phragmites australis). Birds include the black-headed gull (Chroicocephalus ridibundus).

== Reservoir operations ==
The Alzitone Reservoir is the largest reservoir of raw water in the south of the eastern plain. A dam on the Fium'Orbu just downstream from the Sampolo hydroelectric complex creates the Trévadine Reservoir and allows filling the reservoirs in the plain, the 2,300,000 cubic metres (81,000,000 cu ft) Bacciana, the 4,300,000 cubic metres (150,000,000 cu ft) Teppe Rosse and the 5,500,000 cubic metres (190,000,000 cu ft) Alzitone. The reservoirs in turn deliver water using gravity. About 900 litres per second (32 cu ft/s) of water is taken from the Fium'Orbu in winter with occasional peaks of as much as 1,200 litres per second (42 cu ft/s) In summer the Fium'Orbu continue to supply 250 to 400 litres per second (8.8 to 14.1 cu ft/s) to the reservoirs, but delivery of water to users requires operation of pumping stations.

== Gallery ==
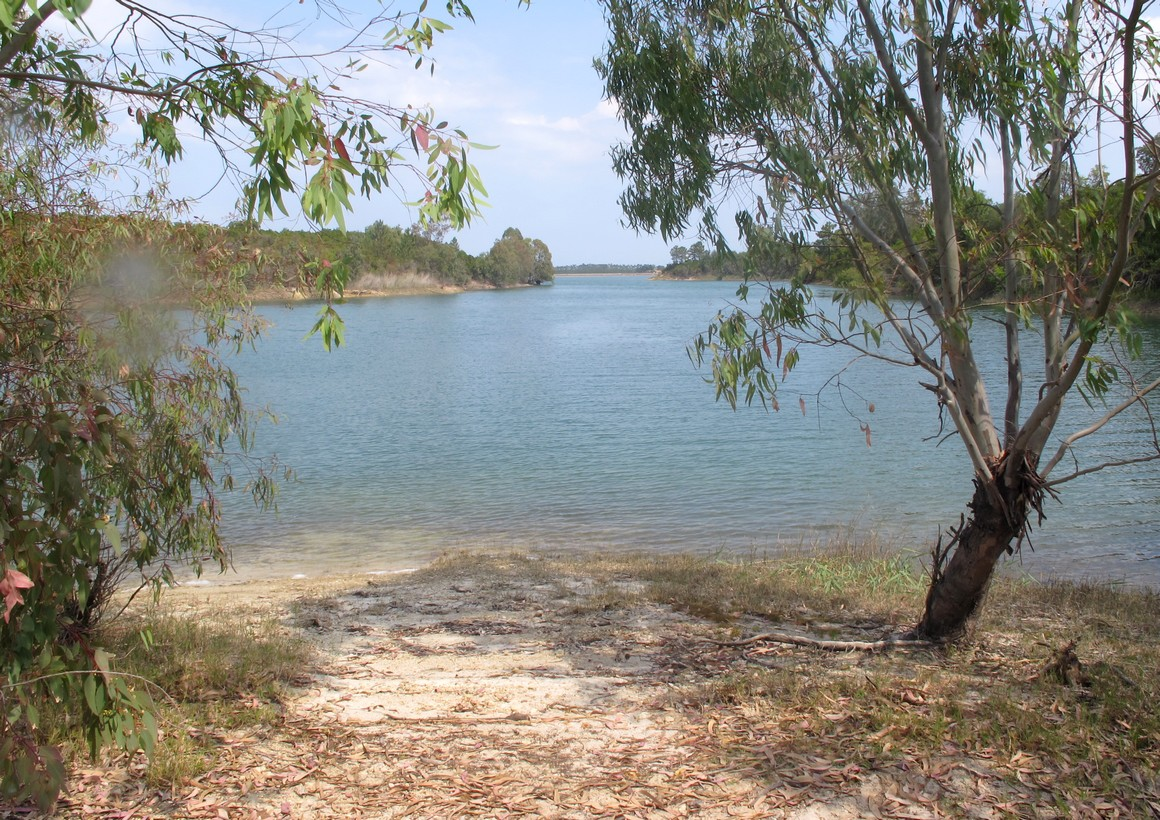
View from the south shore looking east

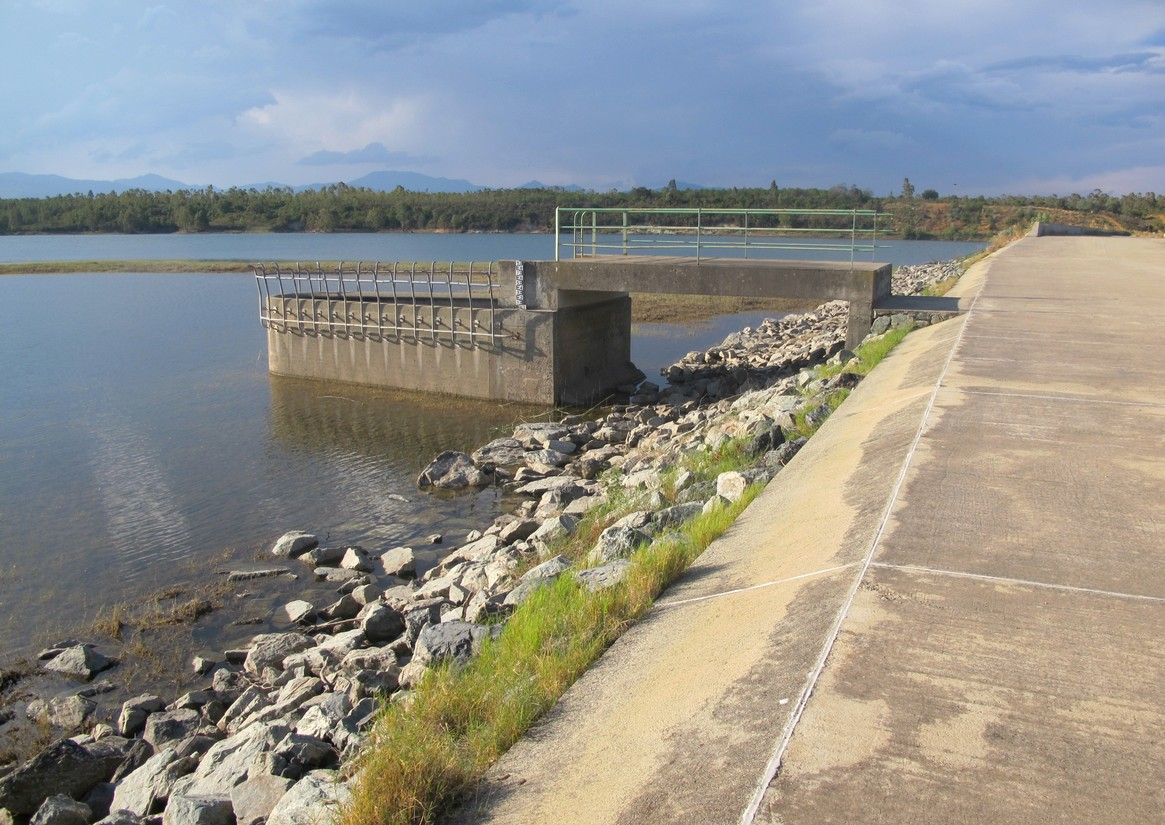
Control structure

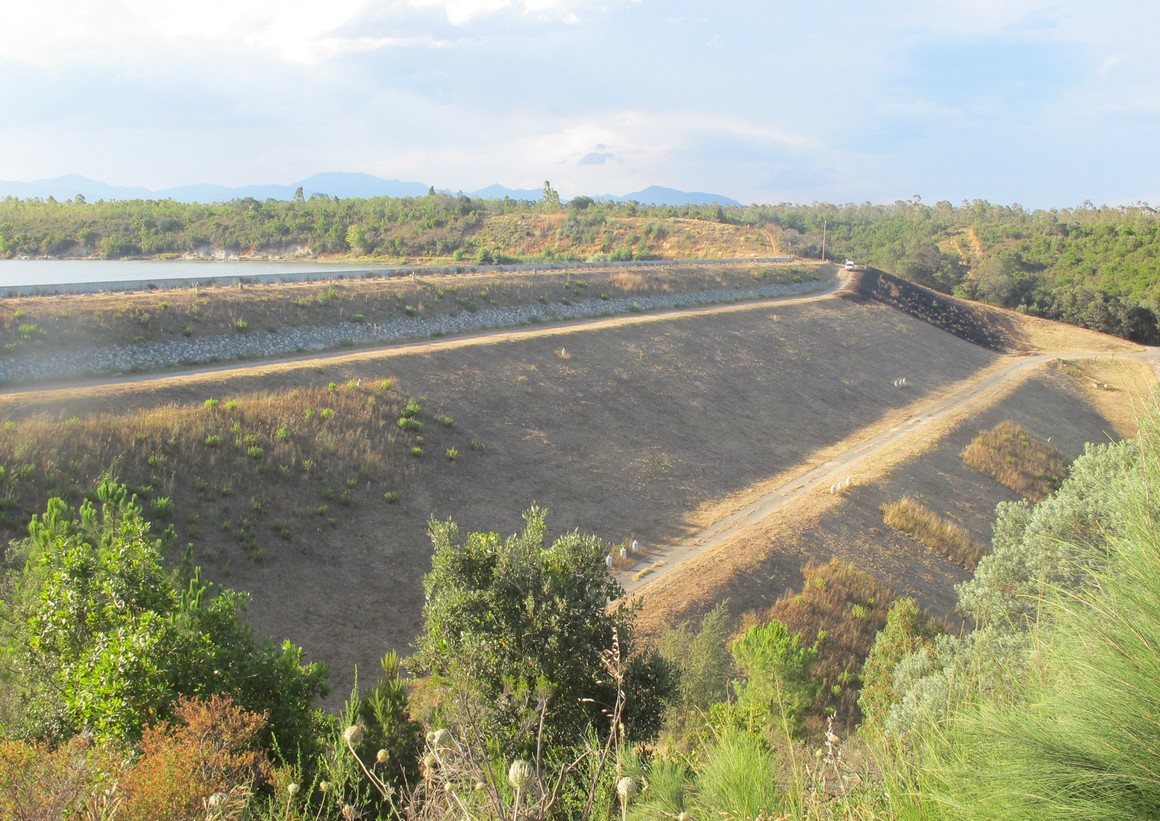
dam from below

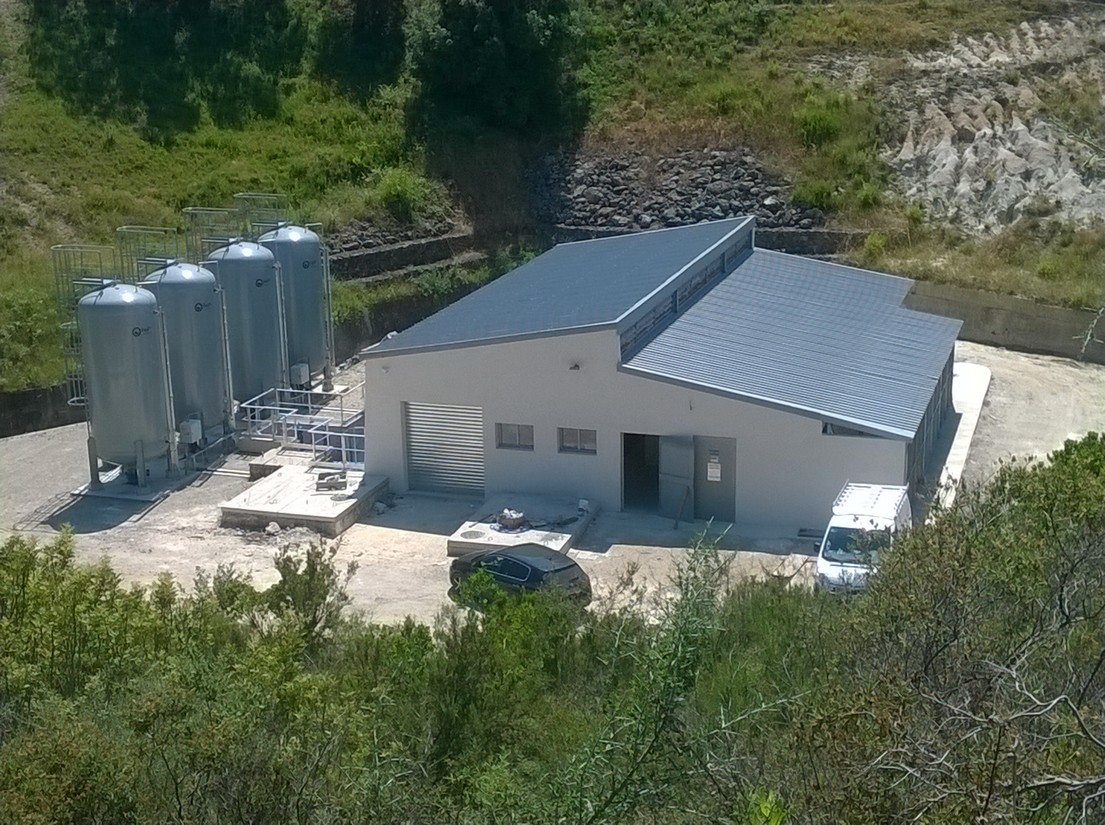
Pumping station below the dam, north side

== Sources ==
- "Corse : Barrage d'Alzitone", eaufrance (in French)
- Découverte zones humides artificielles (in French), Office de Tourisme Fium'Orbu
- FR835COR086 - Retenue d'Alzitone (in French), Initiative PIM, Office de l’Environnement de la Corse (OEC), 2019
- "Relation: Réservoir d'Alzitone (4676319)", OpenStreetMap
- Travaux de sécurisation du site d'Alzitone (PDF) (in French), Office d'Équipement Hydraulique de Corse, 2020
