= Lac du Cinto =

Lake in Corsica, France

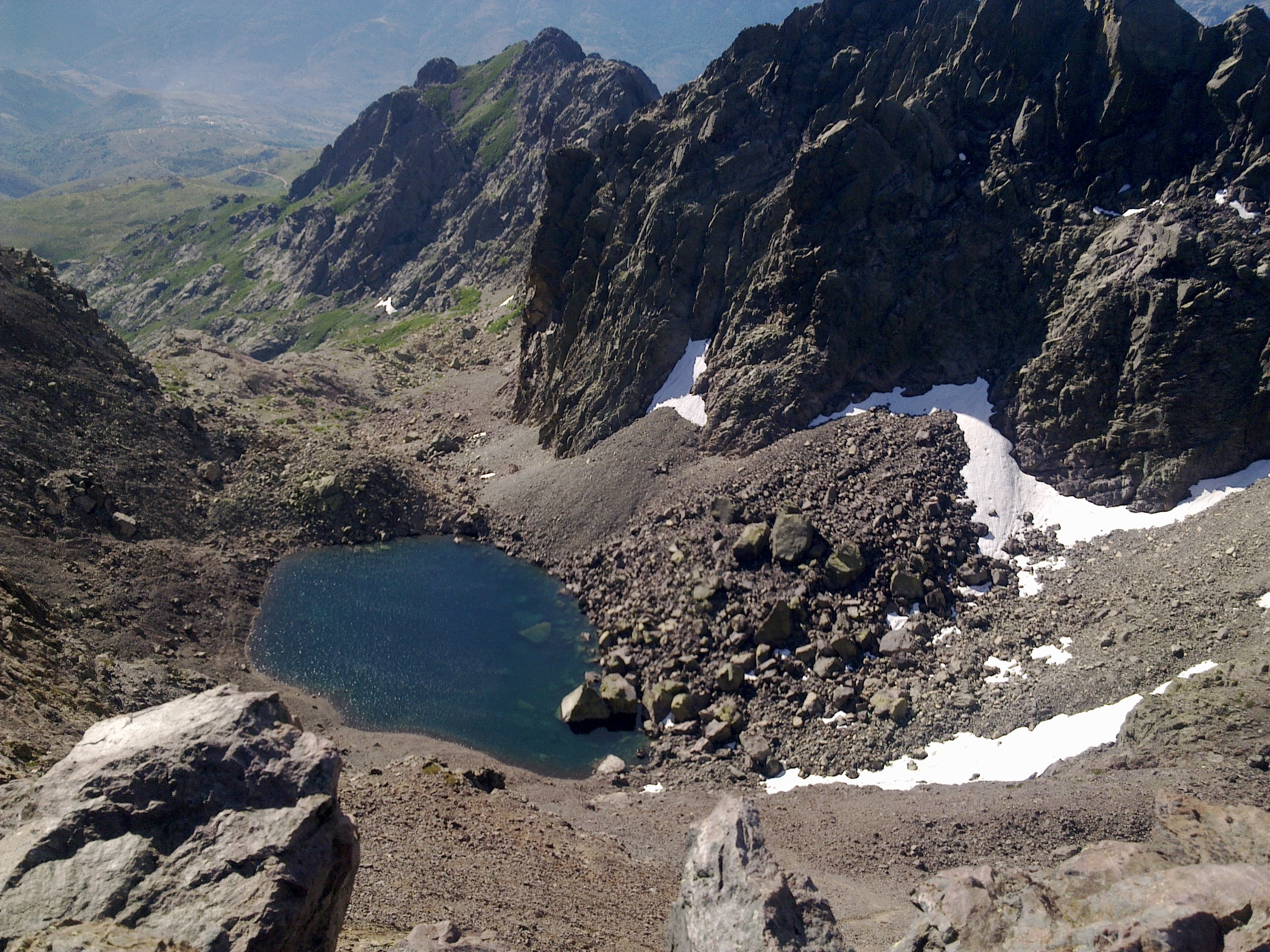

- Location within Corsica
- Location: Corsica
- Coordinates: 42°22′15″N 8°56′02″E
- Type: glacial
- Basin countries: France
- Surface elevation: 2,460 m (8,070 ft)

Lac du Cinto is a lake in Corsica, France.
