= Lac de Bettaniella =

Lake in Corsica, France

- Lavu à a Vetta Niella (Corsican)
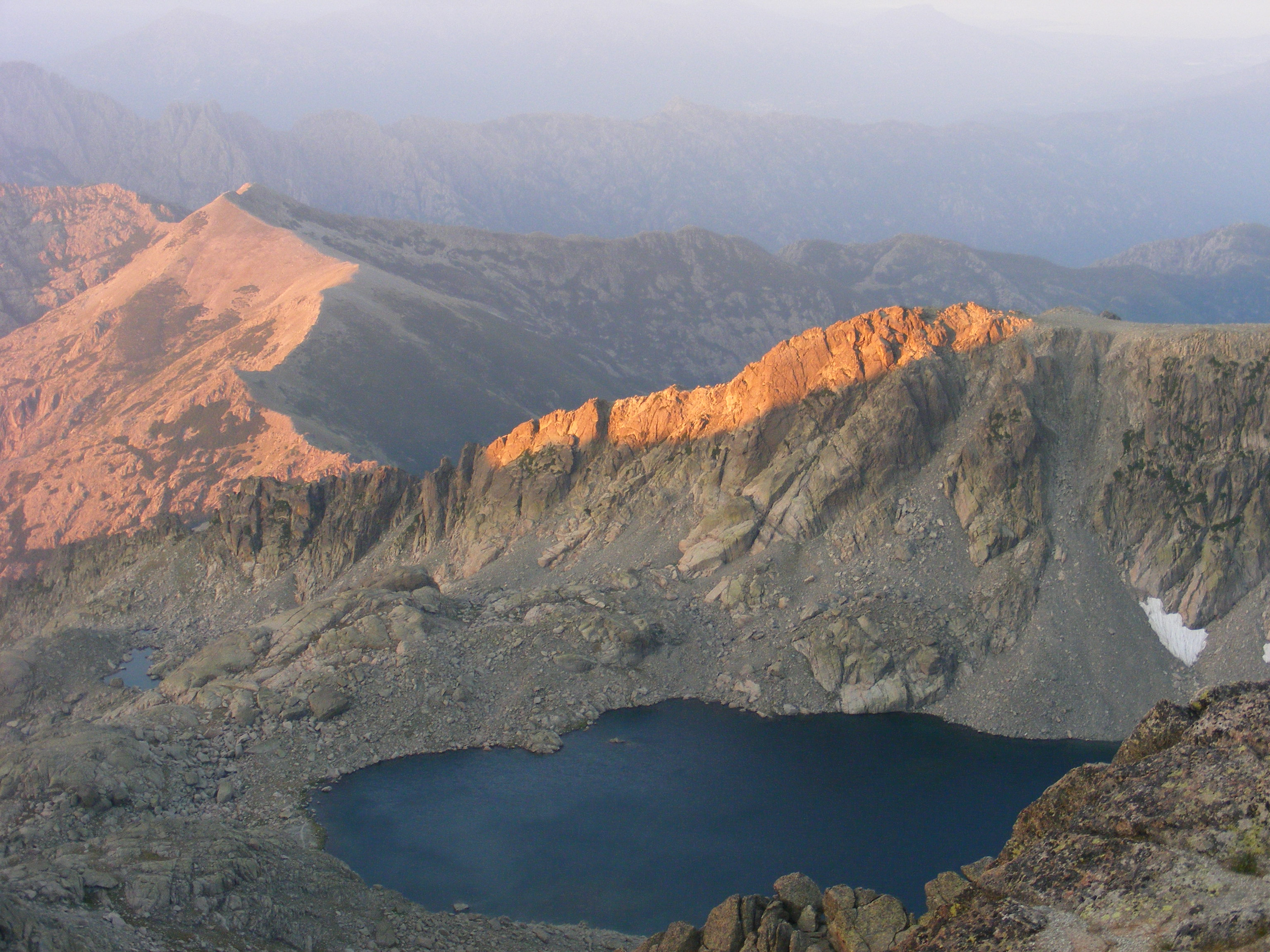

- Location within Corsica Location within France
- Location: Corsica
- Coordinates: 42°12′38″N 9°3′16″E
- Type: glacial
- Basin countries: France
- Surface area: 0.075 km^{2} (0.029 sq mi)
- Max. depth: 32 m (105 ft)
- Surface elevation: 2,321 m (7,615 ft)

Lac de Bettaniella (Corsican: Lavu à a Vetta Niella) is a lake in Corsica, France. At an elevation of 2321 m, its surface area is 0.075 km². In French, it is sometimes alternatively known as Lac de Bellebone or Lac du Rotondo. It is the largest natural lake in Corsica. La de Bettaniella is an endorheic lake and is glacial in origin. The lake is in the Monte Rotondo Massif.
