= Solenzara =

River in the department of Haute-Corse, Corsica

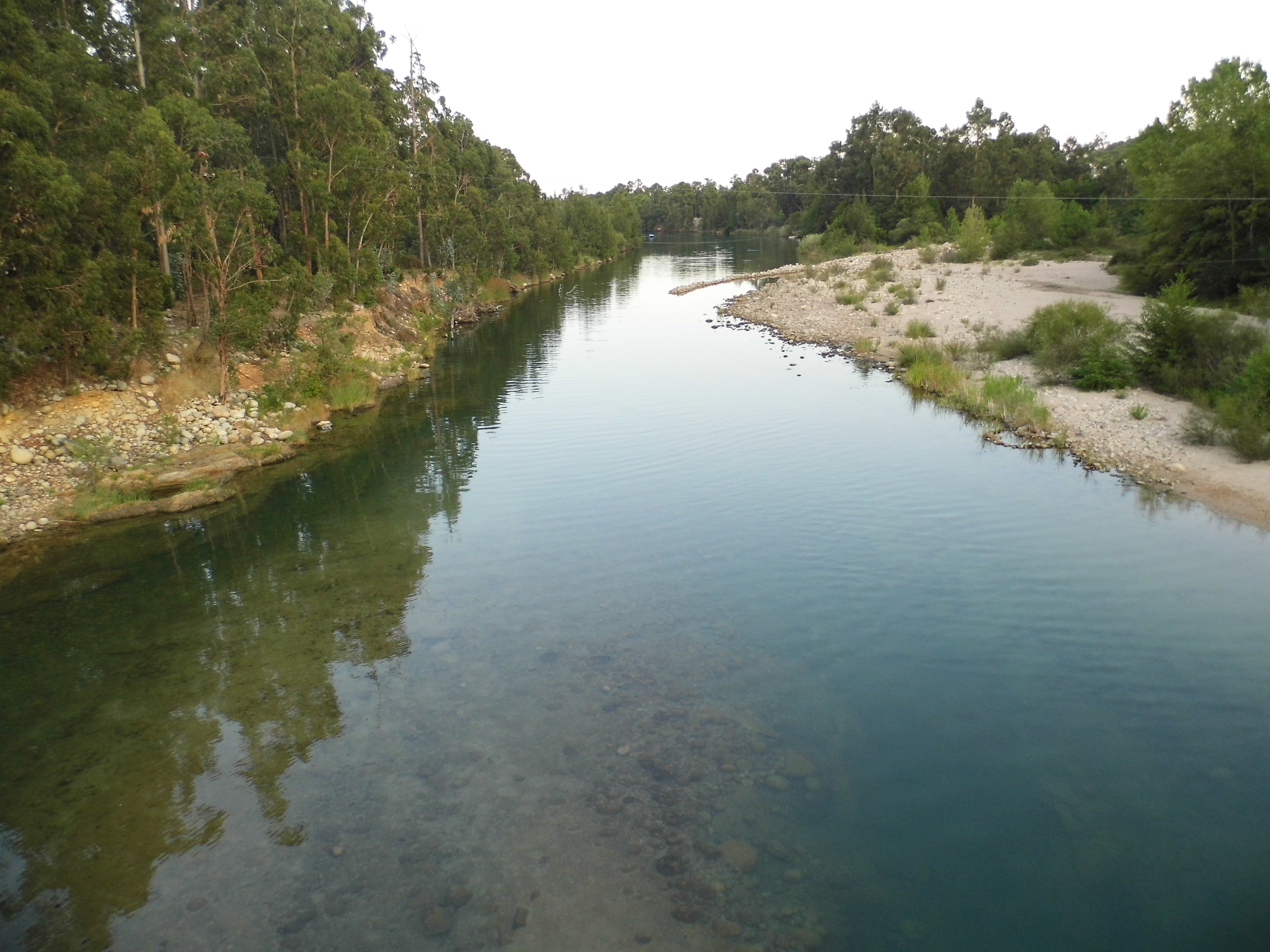
- Solenzara River

- Location within Corsica Location within France

Location
- Country: France
- Region: Corsica
- Department: Corse-du-Sud, Haute-Corse

Physical characteristics
- Mouth: Tyrrhenian Sea
  - coordinates: 41.8592°N 9.402°E

The Solenzara is a small coastal river in the departments of Corse-du-Sud and Haute-Corse, Corsica, France.

== Course ==
The Solenzara River is 21.96 kilometres (13.65 mi) long. It crosses the communes of Quenza and Sari-Solenzara in Corse-du-Sud and Solaro in Haute-Corse. The Solenzara rises to the southeast of the 1,451 metres (4,760 ft) Punta Bigornu and to the north of the village of Bavella in the commune of Quenza, Corse-du-Sud. It flows northeast, paralleled by the D268 road. For about half its length it forms the border between Corse-du-Sud and Haute-Corse. It enters the sea to the north of the town of Solenzara.

The river is popular with tourists, who come to enjoy bathing in the natural basins. Some of them have cliffs that can be used for jumping or diving from up to 8 metres (26 ft).

== Hydrology ==
Measurements of the river flow were taken at the Sari-Solenzara [Canniciu] station from 1974 to 2021. The watershed above this station covers 99.7 square kilometres (38.5 sq mi). Annual precipitation was calculated as 764 millimetres (30.1 in). The average flow of water throughout the year was 2.41 cubic metres per second (85 cu ft/s).

Average flow (cubic meters per second) by month for the period 1961 to 1999
Month	Flow
Jan	3.980
Feb	3.790
Mar	3.380
Apr	2.620
May	1.800
Jun	0.692
Jul	0.279
Aug	0.258
Sep	0.762
Oct	2.660
Nov	4.050
Dec	4.690

== Tributaries ==
The following streams (ruisseaux) are tributaries of the Solenzara (ordered by length) and sub-tributaries:

- Marsolinu 12 km (7.5 mi)
- Fiumicelli 7 km (4.3 mi)
  - Litichine 3 km (1.9 mi)
    - Bujacone 2 km (1.2 mi)
    - Ciuntrone 2 km (1.2 mi)
  - Larone 2 km (1.2 mi)
- Gaglioli 6 km (3.7 mi)
  - Padulella 2 km (1.2 mi)
- San Petru 6 km (3.7 mi)
- Purcaraccia 6 km (3.7 mi)
- Jallicu 5 km (3.1 mi)
  - Ferriate 4 km (2.5 mi)
    - Finosella 1 km (0.62 mi)
  - Frasselli 3 km (1.9 mi)
  - Cateraccia 2 km (1.2 mi)
  - Buzzichellu 2 km (1.2 mi)
    - Jallichellu 2 km (1.2 mi)
- Ciuffatu 5 km (3.1 mi)
  - Utriolu 2 km (1.2 mi)
- Polischellu 4 km (2.5 mi)
- Vadina Francese 3 km (1.9 mi)
  - Prunellu 2 km (1.2 mi)
- Scalzu 3 km (1.9 mi)
  - Fossi 2 km (1.2 mi)
- Castellucciu 3 km (1.9 mi)
  - Macchine 2 km (1.2 mi)
- Malaspina 3 km (1.9 mi)
  - Plutone 2 km (1.2 mi)
- Olmiccia 3 km (1.9 mi)
- Petra Grossa 2 km (1.2 mi)
- Pampalone 2 km (1.2 mi)
  - Trovone 1 km (0.62 mi)
- Quercitellu 2 km (1.2 mi)
- Buccarona 2 km (1.2 mi)
- Capannelle 2 km (1.2 mi)
- Nidicale 2 km (1.2 mi)
- Cannicciu 2 km (1.2 mi)
- Perellu 1 km (0.62 mi)

== Sources ==
- "La Solenzara à Sari-Solenzara [Canniciu]", eaufrance (in French), Ministère de l'Ecologie, du Développement Durable et de l'Energie
- "La Solenzara", Sandre (in French)
- "Relation: La Solenzara (8376445)", OpenStreetMap
- "Solenzara", Paradisu
