= Lac de Padula =

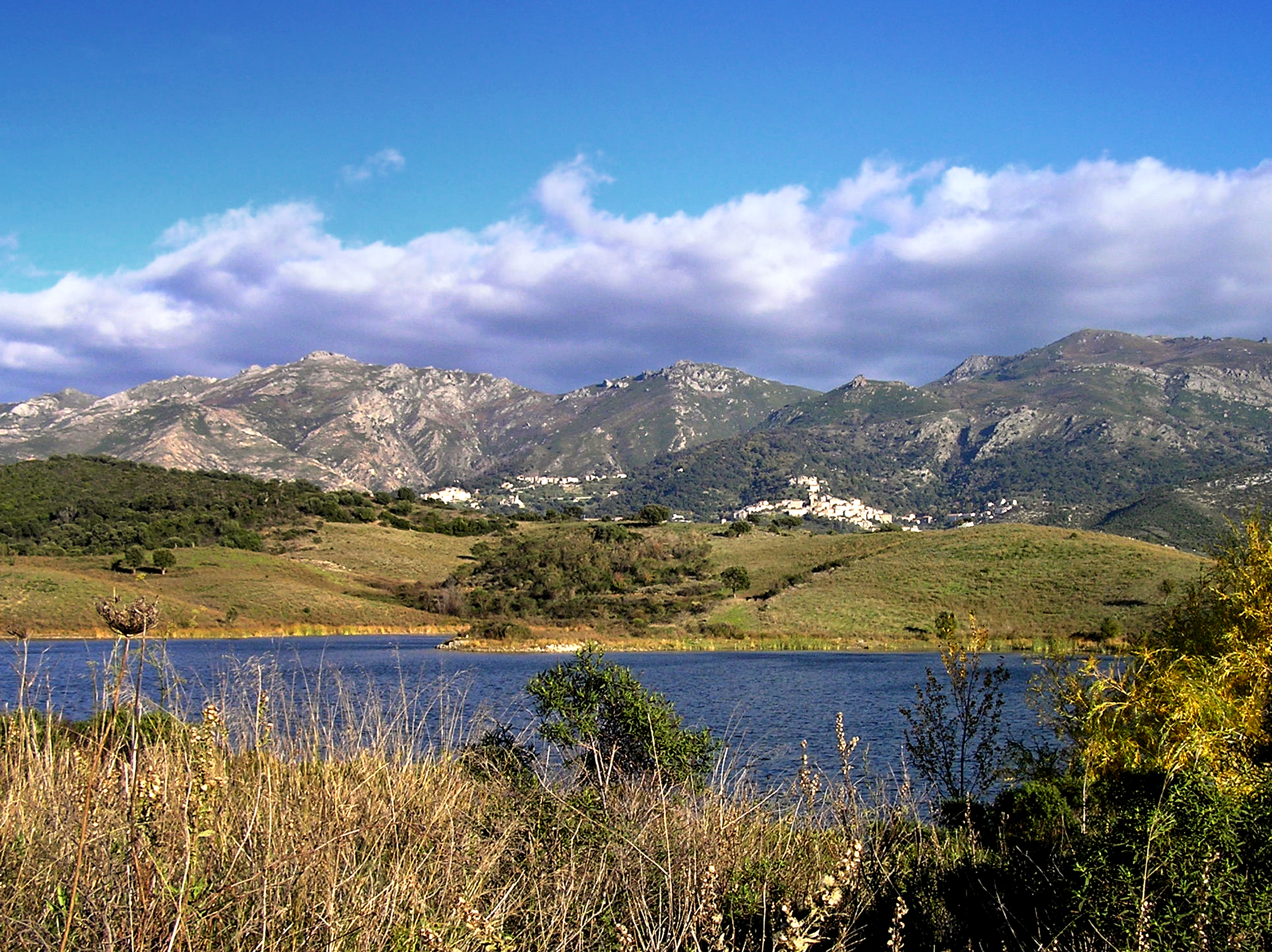
- Lake Padula and the village of Oletta

- Location within Corsica Location within France
- Location: Haute-Corse, Corsica, France
- Coordinates: 42°37′41″N 9°19′22″E
- Type: Reservoir
- Basin countries: France

Lac de Padula is a reservoir in the Haute-Corse department of France, on the island of Corsica. It was built to supply water for irrigation and firefighting, but now also provides drinking water during the summer tourist peak.

== Location ==
Lac de Padula is in the commune of Oletta apart from two small parts of its southern shore, which are in the commune of Olmeta-di-Tuda. The D262 road from the village of Oletta to the east crosses the eastern arm of the lake and then runs along its south shore. The lake is formed by a dam across the Ruisseau de Furmicaiola, a tributary of the Ruisseau Salinelle, which in turn is a tributary of the Aliso River. Other inflows are the Vitte and Vomera streams (ruisseaux).

== Dam ==
After a fire in the Nebbio in 1989, the water tables in the Saint-Florent plain were empty. The reservoir was created to provide water for irrigation and firefighting. The dam was commissioned in 1991 and began to supply an irrigation network in the Oletta plain.

Requirements for drinking water in the nearby tourist center of Saint-Florent began to rise. An order of 9 November 2005 authorized use of water from the Aliso river and the Padula reservoir for human consumption. The Office d'Equipement Hydraulique de Corse (OEHC) was authorised to withdraw and treat up to 2,000,000 cubic metres (71,000,000 cu ft) of water during the peak summer tourist period in the Nebbio region. The land around the reservoir was protected.

== Reservoir ==
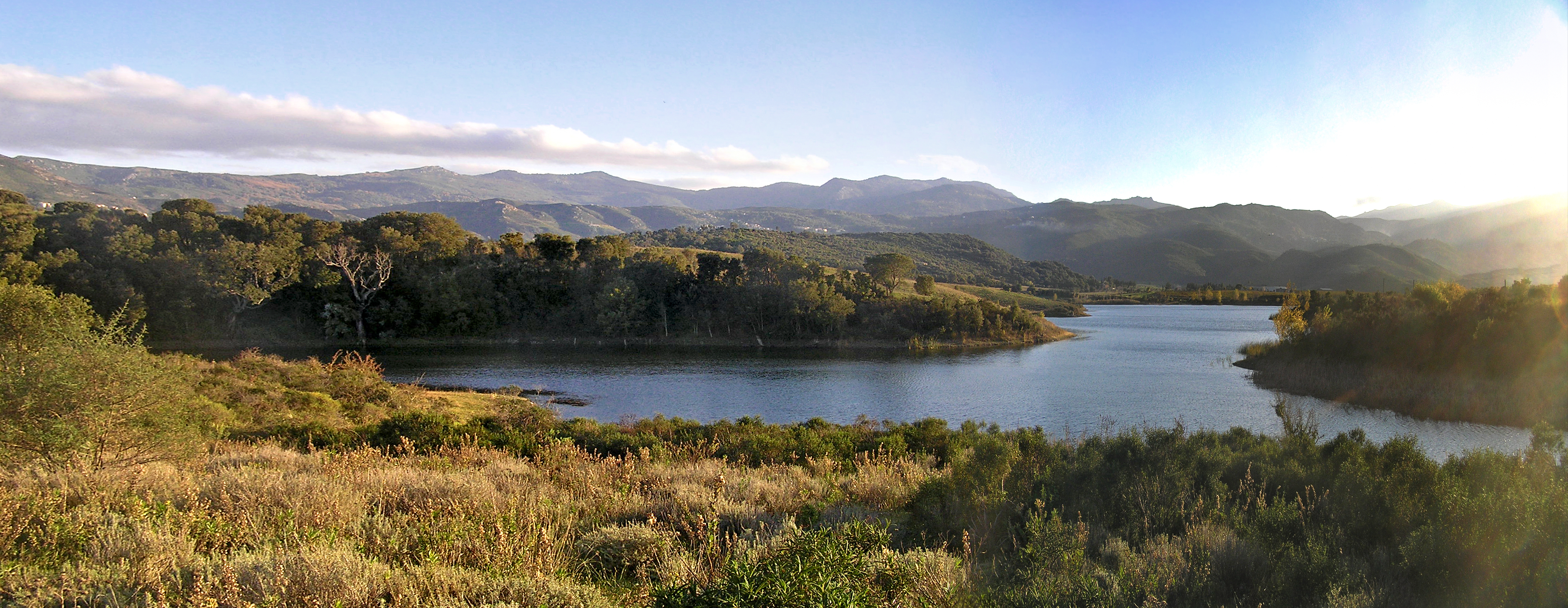
Panorama of the lake

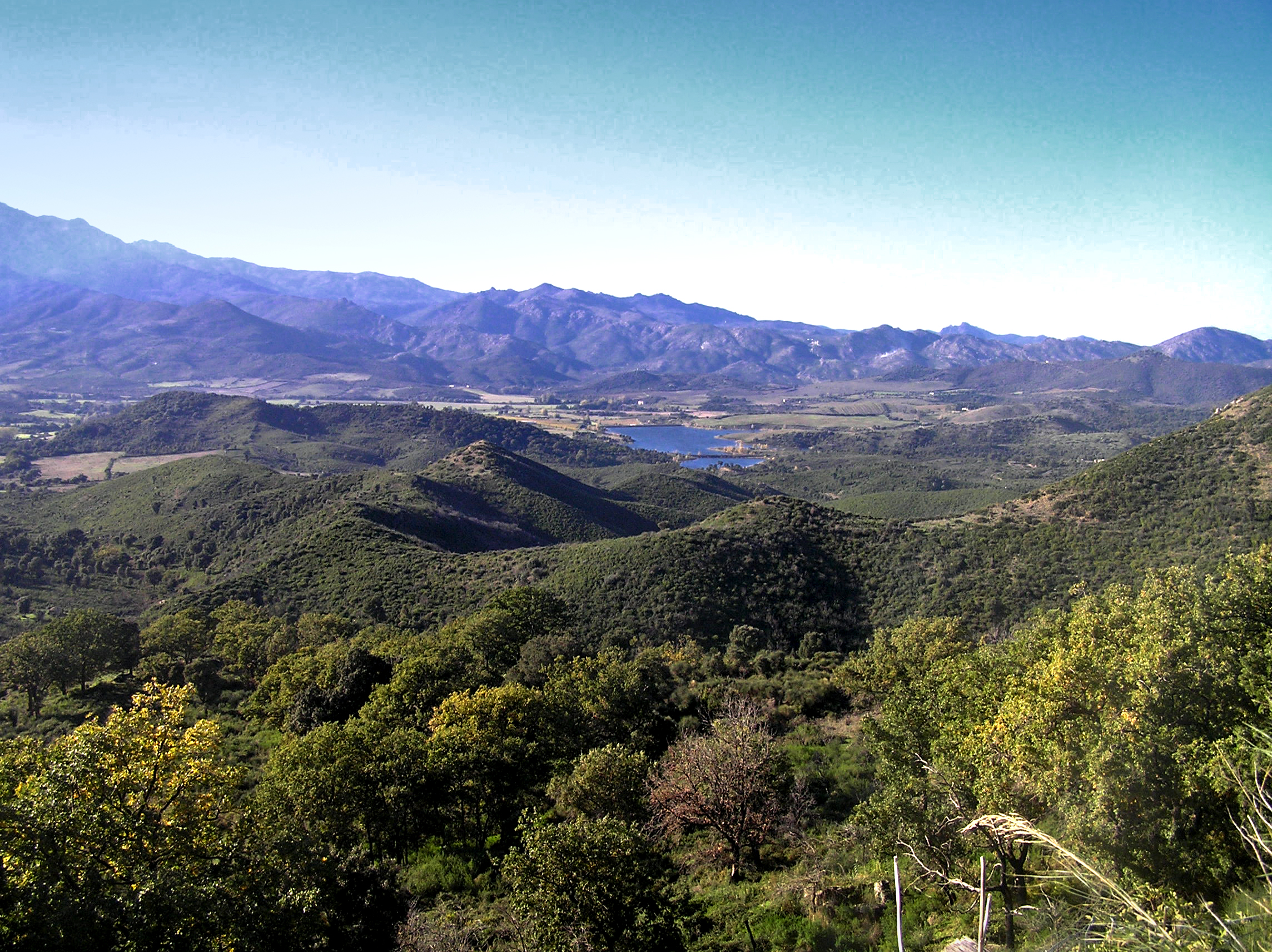
View from a distance

The lake lies among mountains and is surrounded by meadows, forest and wild plants. It covers 26 hectares (64 acres). The villages of Oletta and Olmeta-di-Tuda look over the lake from higher ground. Repopulation of the lake with fish is allowed, as is fishing. However, the lake may only be approached on foot, and swimming and all types of boating are prohibited.

The volume of water in the reservoir in the period from 2003 to 2009 fluctuated from a minimum of 800,000 cubic metres (28,000,000 cu ft) to a maximum of 1,900,000 cubic metres (67,000,000 cu ft). Average volumes were 1,100,000 to 1,800,000 cubic metres (39,000,000 to 64,000,000 cu ft).

The reservoir is upstream from the Aliso-Oletta Natura 2000 site. It has the effect of disrupting the natural flow of the Aliso river. Releases of water cause rapid influxes of water. In summer a small reserved flow of 0.007 cubic metres per second (0.25 cu ft/s) from the dam creates a minimum flow in the tributary and to some extent in the Aliso.

== Sources ==
- Arrêté n° 2005-313-5 en date du 9 novembre 2005 (PDF) (in French), DDAFHC
- Averty, Marnie (18 November 2020), 13 balades autour de Bastia (in French)
- Balkiara (September 2016), "Lac de Padula en Haute Corse", Joueb.com (in French)
- "Relation: Lac de Padula (5543655)", OpenStreetMap
- Situation hydroclimatique en Corse pour le mois de Mai 2010 (in French), DREAL Corse, Service de l’Eau, 2010
- Zone Spéciale de Conservation N° FR9400601 « Aliso-Oletta » (PDF) (in French), Commune d'Oletta, 2 December 2010
