= Sandre =

French public administration

Sandre stands for Service d'administration nationale des données et des référentiels sur l'eau, or National Service for Water Data and Common Repositories Management of France. The Sandre service establishes the common water data language of the French national Water Information System (SIE: Système d’information sur l’eau).

Sandre is a division of the National Agency of Water and Aquatic Environments (Onema: Office national de l’eau et des milieux aquatiques). Its technical secretariat is entrusted to the International Office for Water (OIE: Office International de l’Eau).

== Missions ==
The Sandre is in charge of describing water data and defining technical scenarios to allow data interchange between producers, users and databanks. These data are based on reference datasets (code lists) managed by the Sandre.

== Services ==
The Sandre makes available specification documents (1) free of charge for water data interchanges. It maintains a permanent helpdesk for implementation of these (2). It manages reference datasets (code lists - ex : taxa, monitoring parameters...) (3).

(1) Sandre specification documents are specifications freely available for the definition, interchange and dissemination of water data and datasets. These documents help designing databases, exchange files, web services, etc.

(2) Sandre technical support is a helpdesk for the use of Sandre’s specifications. The Sandre proposes especially compliance checks. Compliance checks are test sets implemented and applied to a system (software, databases, etc) to check its compliance to Sandre‘s specifications.

(3) Sandre reference datasets are elementary alphanumerical (ex : chemical substances code lists ) or geographic information (BDCarthage via the online metadata catalogue or the geoviewer) whose use is free of charge, and necessary for the well functioning of a system (software such as LIMS, databases, etc).

== See also ==
- Water supply and sanitation in France
