= Teppe Rosse Reservoir =

Reservoir on Corsica, France

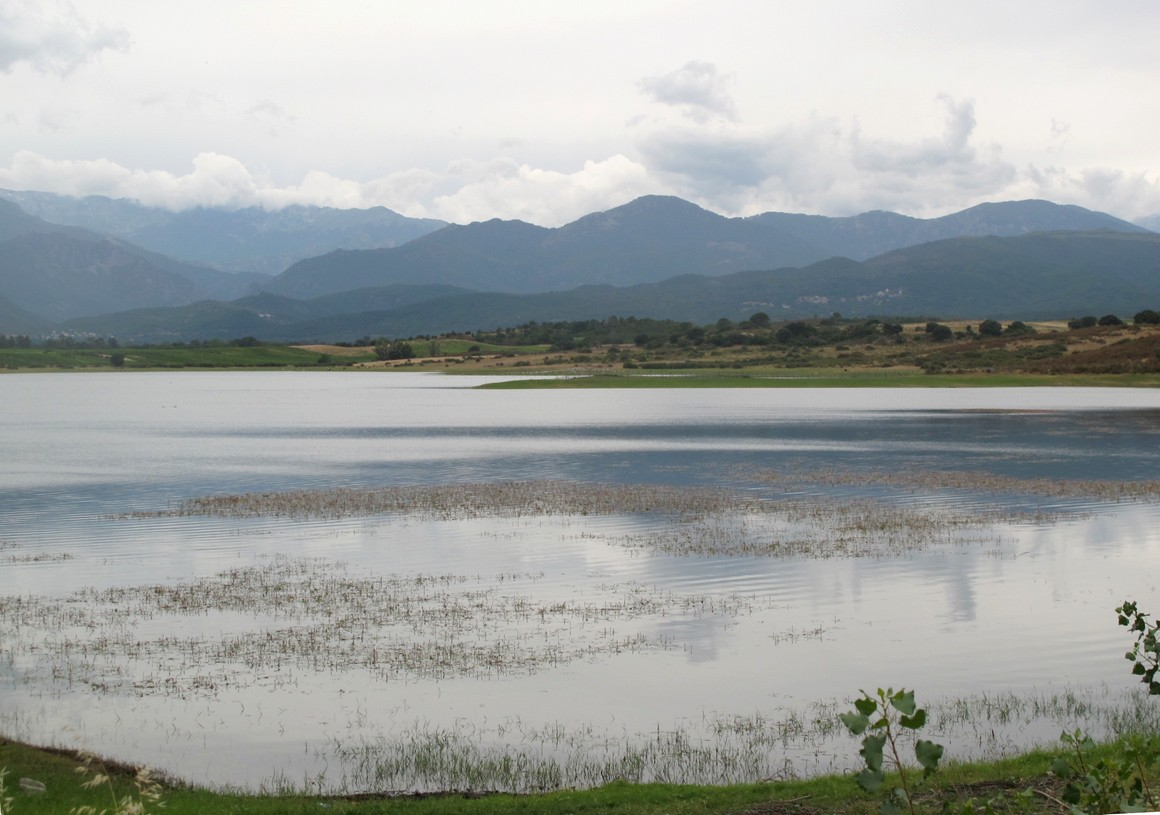
- The Teppe-Rosse reservoir seen from the east. Behind, the interior massifs of the island

- Location within Corsica Location within France
- Location: Haute-Corse, Corsica
- Coordinates: 42.10167°N 9.46444°E
- Type: Reservoir
- Basin countries: France

Teppe Rosse Reservoir (French: Réservoir de Teppe Rosse, Retenue de Teppe Rosse) is a reservoir in the Haute-Corse department of France, on the island of Corsica. It supplies water for drinking and irrigation.

== Dam ==
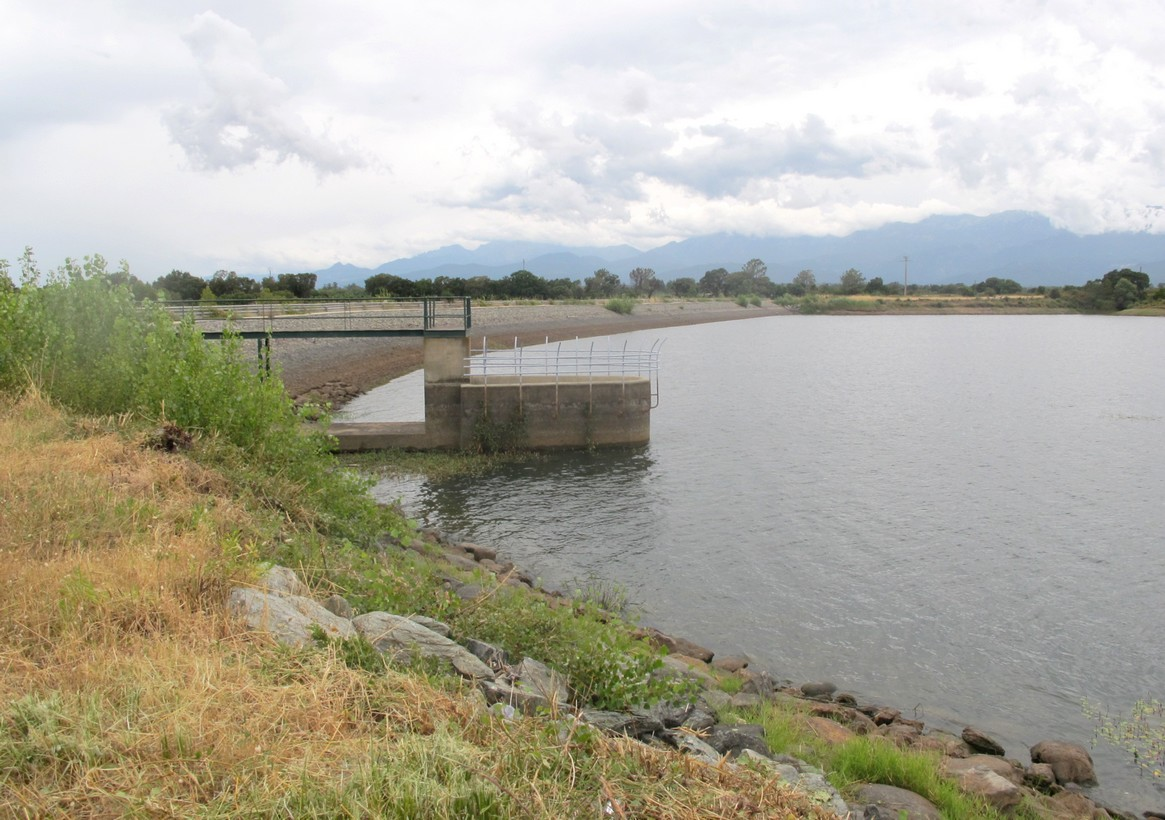
Dam, control structure

The reservoir is in the eastern coastal plain of Corsica. It is mainly in the commune of Aléria, with the southwest portion in the commune of Aghione.} It is southeast of the Bacciana Reservoir and northeast of the Tagnone river. The embankment dam came into service in 1964. It is 16 metres (52 ft) high and 900 metres (3,000 ft) long, with a crest elevation of 34.5 metres (113 ft). It retains 4,350,000 cubic metres (154,000,000 cu ft) of water. The reservoir covers 60 hectares (150 acres) in a drainage basin of 2.35 square kilometres (0.91 sq mi).

== Operations ==
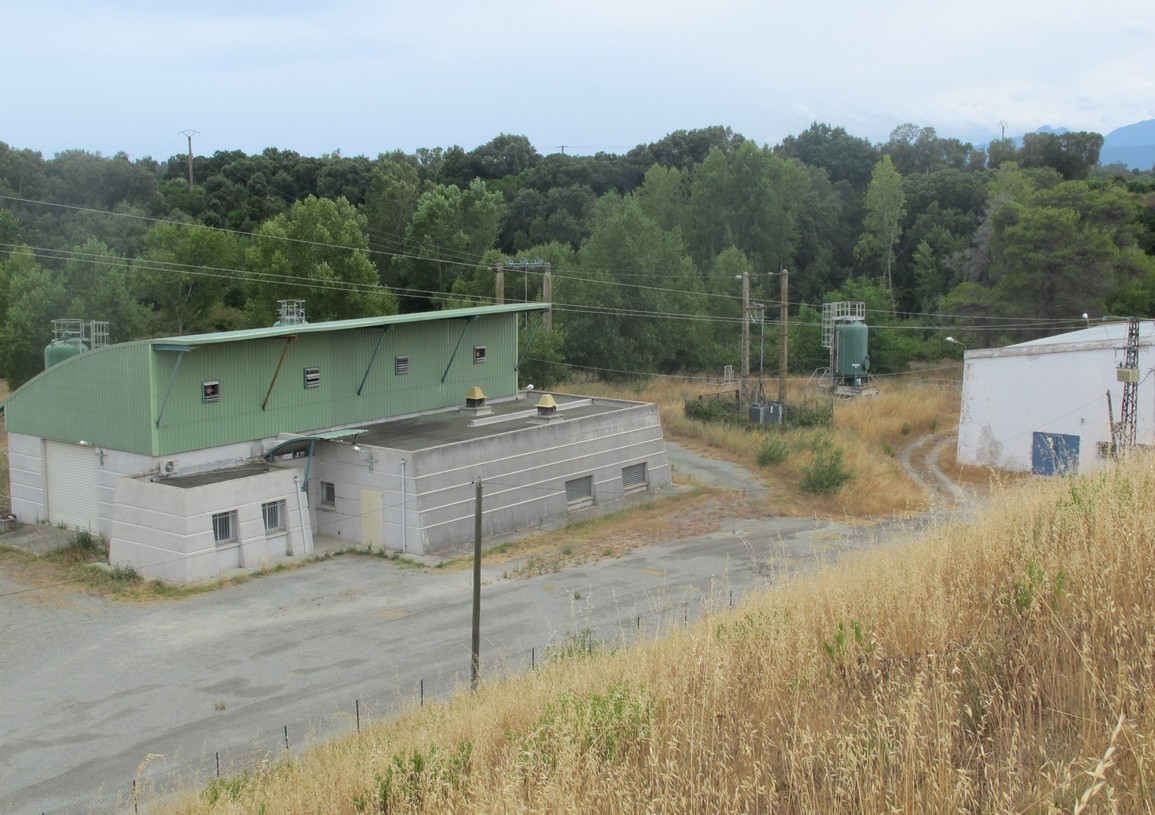
Pumping station below the dam

The dam is managed by the Office d’Équipement Hydraulique de Corse. A dam on the Fium'Orbu just downstream from the Sampolo hydroelectric complex creates the Trévadine Reservoir and allows filling the reservoirs in the plain, the 2,350,000 cubic metres (83,000,000 cu ft) Bacciana Reservoir, the 4,300,000 cubic metres (150,000,000 cu ft) (Note: The 2020 report on Travaux de sécurisation du site d’Alzitone gives the capacity of the reservoir as 2,300,000 cubic metres (81,000,000 cu ft). This is inconsistent with other sources that give the capacity as 4,300,000 cubic metres (150,000,000 cu ft) or 4,350,000 cubic metres (154,000,000 cu ft).) Teppe Rosse Reservoir and the 5,500,000 cubic metres (190,000,000 cu ft) Alzitone Reservoir. The reservoirs in turn deliver water using gravity.

In winter an outlet in the Trévadine Reservoir supplies an 800 millimetres (31 in) above-ground steel pipe that runs for a distance of 7.5 kilometres (4.7 mi) to the reservoirs of Alzitone, Teppe Rosse and Bacciana. It is able to carry about 0.9 cubic metres (32 cu ft) per second. Downstream a network of distribution pipes carries water to users in the municipalities of Prunelli-di-Fiumorbo, Serra-di-Fiumorbo, Ventiseri and Solaro.

About 900 litres per second (32 cu ft/s) of water is taken from the Fium'Orbu in winter with occasional peaks of as much as 1,200 litres per second (42 cu ft/s). In summer the Fium'Orbu continue to supply 250 to 400 litres per second (8.8 to 14.1 cu ft/s) to the reservoirs, but delivery of water to users requires operation of pumping stations.

== Ecology ==
The reservoir has medium biological significance. Flora include sedges (Carex species), yellow fleabane (Dittrichia viscosa), water knotweed (Persicaria amphibia), common reed (Phragmites australis), black poplar (Populus nigra), roses (Rubus species), lakeshore bulrush (Schoenoplectus lacustris), rough bindweed (Smilax aspera) and broadleaf cattail (Typha latifolia). Birds include red kite (Milvus milvus), European bee-eater (Merops apiaster), Eurasian coot (Fulica atra), carrion crow (Corvus corone), grey heron (Ardea cinerea) and great crested grebe (Podiceps cristatus). Amphibians include the pool frog (Pelophylax lessonae bergeri).

Fishing is allowed in most of the reservoir. It is limited to angling or casting from the shore, fishing from a flat-bottomed boat (oar, scull or pedal), and float tube fishing under some conditions.

== Sources ==
- Corse : Barrage de Teppe Rosse (in French), CFBR Comité Français des Barrages et Réservoirs
- Dossier d'utilité publique du Fium'orbu (PDF) (in French), OEHC, archived from the original (PDF) on 2021-12-29
- FR835COR077 - Retenue de Teppe Rosse, PIM Initiative, Corsican Environment Office (OEC), 2019
- Liste des sites (in French), OEHC : Office d’Équipement Hydraulique de Corse
- Travaux de sécurisation du site d'Alzitone (PDF) (in French), Office d'Équipement Hydraulique de Corse, 2020
- "Way: Réservoir de Teppe Rosse (27119072)", OpenStreetMap
