= Bacciana Reservoir =

Reservoir on Corsica, France

- Location within Corsica Location within France
- Location: Haute-Corse, Corsica
- Coordinates: 42.1145°N 9.4471°E
- Type: Reservoir
- Basin countries: France
- Surface area: 37 hectares (91 acres)
- Water volume: 2,350,000 cubic metres (83,000,000 cu ft)
- Surface elevation: 54 metres (177 ft)

Bacciana Reservoir (French: Réservoir de Bacciana, Retenue de Bacciana) is a reservoir in the Haute-Corse department of France, on the island of Corsica. It supplies water for drinking and irrigation.

== Dam ==
The Bacciana Reservoir is in the commune of Aléria in the eastern coastal plain of Corsica. It is north of the Teppe Rosse Reservoir and northeast of the Tagnone river. The dam is semi-circular, extending round the east of the reservoir. The earthfill dam came into service in 2002. It is 15 metres (49 ft) high and 890 metres (2,920 ft) long, with a crest elevation of 54 metres (177 ft). It retains 2,350,000 cubic metres (83,000,000 cu ft) of water. The reservoir covers 37 hectares (91 acres). Its watershed covers 1.14 square kilometres (0.44 sq mi).

== Operations ==
The dam is managed by the Office d’Équipement Hydraulique de Corse. A dam on the Fium'Orbu just downstream from the Sampolo hydroelectric complex creates the Trévadine Reservoir and allows filling the reservoirs in the plain, the Bacciana, the 4,300,000 cubic metres (150,000,000 cu ft) Teppe Rosse Reservoir and the 5,500,000 cubic metres (190,000,000 cu ft) Alzitone Reservoir. The reservoirs in turn deliver water using gravity.

In winter an outlet in the Trévadine Reservoir supplies an 800 millimetres (31 in) above-ground steel pipe that runs for a distance of 7.5 kilometres (4.7 mi) to the reservoirs of Alzitone, Teppe Rosse and Bacciana. It is able to carry about 0.9 cubic metres (32 cu ft) per second. Downstream a network of distribution pipes carries water to users in the municipalities of Prunelli-di-Fiumorbo, Serra-di-Fiumorbo, Ventiseri and Solaro.

About 900 litres per second (32 cu ft/s) of water is taken from the Fium'Orbu in winter with occasional peaks of as much as 1,200 litres per second (42 cu ft/s). In summer the Fium'Orbu continue to supply 250 to 400 litres per second (8.8 to 14.1 cu ft/s) to the reservoirs, but delivery of water to users requires operation of pumping stations.

== Ecology ==
The reservoir has low biological significance. Flora include sedges (Carex species), yellow fleabane (Dittrichia viscosa), water knotweed (Persicaria amphibia), common reed (Phragmites australis), black poplar (Populus nigra), roses (Rubus species), lakeshore bulrush (Schoenoplectus lacustris), rough bindweed (Smilax aspera) and broadleaf cattail (Typha latifolia). Birds include red kite (Milvus milvus), European bee-eater (Merops apiaster), Eurasian coot (Fulica atra), carrion crow (Corvus corone), grey heron (Ardea cinerea) and great crested grebe (Podiceps cristatus). Amphibians include the pool frog (Pelophylax lessonae bergeri).

Fishing is allowed in the western half of the reservoir. It is limited to angling or casting from the shore, fishing from a flat-bottomed boat (oar, scull or pedal), and float tube fishing under some conditions.

== Sources ==
- Corse : Barrage de Bacciana (in French), CFBR Comité Français des Barrages et Réservoirs
- Dossier d'utilité publique du Fium'orbu (PDF) (in French), OEHC
- FR835COR076 - Retenue de Bacciana, PIM Initiative, Corsican Environment Office (OEC), 2019
- Liste des sites (in French), OEHC : Office d’Équipement Hydraulique de Corse
- Travaux de sécurisation du site d'Alzitone (PDF) (in French), Office d'Équipement Hydraulique de Corse, 2020
- "Way: Réservoir de Bacciana (27119059)", OpenStreetMap
