= Saltaruccio =

Stream in the department of Haute-Corse, Corsica

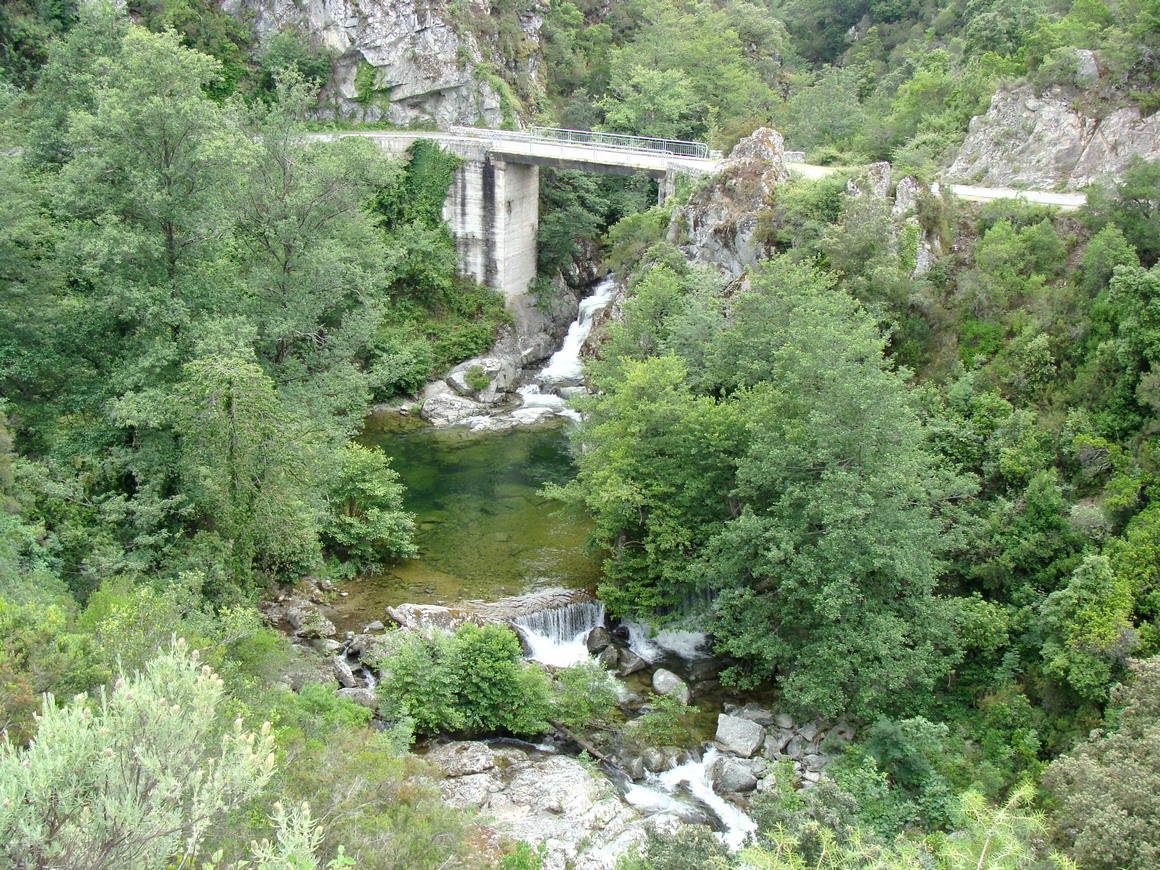
- Bridge on the road from Poggio-di-Nazza to Lugo-di-Nazza the only bridge on the Saltaruccio

- Location within Corsica Location within France

Location
- Country: France
- Region: Corsica
- Department: Haute-Corse

Physical characteristics
- Mouth: Fiumorbo
  - coordinates: 42.0488°N 9.3669°E

Basin features
- Progression: Fiumorbo→ Tyrrhenian Sea

The Saltaruccio (French: Ruisseau de Saltaruccio) is a stream in the department of Haute-Corse, Corsica, France. It is a tributary of the Fiumorbo.

== Course ==
The Saltaruccio is 14.97 kilometres (9.30 mi) long and flows through the communes of Lugo-di-Nazza and Poggio-di-Nazza. It rises to the northeast of the 1,769 metres (5,804 ft) Punta di Taoria and flows northeast and then east between the villages of Poggio-di-Nazza and Lugo-di-Nazza. The D44 linking these villages crosses the stream. It continues in a generally east-southeast direction to its confluence with the Fiumorbo to the northwest of the town of Ghisonaccia.

== Environment ==
The Saltaruccio flows through the Forêts du Fiumorbu, designated as a Zone naturelle d'intérêt écologique, faunistique et floristique (ZNIEFF). This includes the upper and middle watershed of the Abatesco and tributaries of the Fium'Orbu river such as the Saltaruccio and Varagno streams. The higher parts of the area are mainly covered with beech forest (Fagus sylvatica), birch groves, fir forests and laricio pines (Pinus nigra laricio). Lower down there are stands of maritime pines (Pinus pinaster) and holm oaks (Quercus ilex).

== Tributaries ==
The following streams (ruisseaux) are tributaries of the Varagno (ordered by length) and sub-tributaries:

- Poletrella: 4 km (2.5 mi)
- Buoni Pargoli: 4 km (2.5 mi)
- Sambuchi: 3 km (1.9 mi)
- Ternale: 2 km (1.2 mi)
- Caniozzo: 2 km (1.2 mi)
- Pane Casciolo: 2 km (1.2 mi)
- Salto Leandro: 2 km (1.2 mi)
- Nevalpiana: 1 km (0.62 mi)

== Sources ==
- Moneglia, P.; Pastinelli, A.M., Forêts du Fiumorbu (PDF) (in French), Paris: INPN, SPN-MNHN
- "Relation: Ruisseau de Saltaruccio (9719775)", OpenStreetMap
- "Ruisseau de Saltaruccio", Sandre (in French)
