= Poggio =

Poggio is an Italian word meaning "knoll". It may refer to:

== Places ==
=== France ===
- Poggio-di-Nazza, Haute-Corse, Corsica
- Poggio-di-Venaco, Haute-Corse, Corsica
- Poggio-d'Oletta, Haute-Corse, Corsica
- Poggio-Marinaccio, Haute-Corse, Corsica
- Poggio-Mezzana, Haute-Corse, Corsica
- Santa-Maria-Poggio, Haute-Corse, Corsica

=== Italy ===
==== Municipalities (comuni) ====
- Poggio a Caiano, Prato, Tuscany
- Poggio Berni, Rimini, Emilia-Romagna
- Poggio Bustone, Rieti, Lazio
- Poggio Catino, Rieti, Lazio
- Poggio Imperiale, Foggia, Apulia
- Poggio Mirteto, Rieti, Lazio
- Poggio Moiano, Rieti, Lazio
- Poggio Nativo, Rieti, Lazio
- Poggio Picenze, L'Aquila, Abruzzo
- Poggio Renatico, Ferrara, Emilia-Romagna
- Poggio Rusco, Mantova, Lombardy
- Poggio San Lorenzo, Rieti, Lazio
- Poggio San Marcello, Ancona, Marche
- Poggio San Vicino, Macerata, Marche
- Poggio Sannita, Isernia, Molise
- Poggiodomo, Perugia, Umbria
- Poggiofiorito, Chieti, Abruzzo
- Poggiomarino, Naples, Campania
- Poggioreale, Trapani, Sicily
- Poggiorsini, Bari, Apulia
- Poggiridenti, Sondrio, Lombardy

==== Civil parishes (frazioni), quarters, localities ====
- Poggio, Castello di Annone, Asti, Piedmont
- Poggio, Marciana, Livorno, Tuscany
- Poggio di Ancona, Ancona, Marche
- Poggio Buco, archaeological site in Pitigliano, Grosseto, Tuscany
- Poggio dei Pini, a frazione of Capoterra, Cagliari, Sardinia
- Poggio di San Remo, a frazione of San Remo, Imperia, Liguria
- Poggio Filippo, a frazione of Tagliacozzo, L'Aquila, Abruzzo
- Poggio Primocaso, a frazione of Cascia, Perugia, Umbria
- Poggio Rattieri, a frazione of Torricella Sicura, Teramo, Abruzzo
- Poggio Santa Maria, a frazione of L'Aquila, L'Aquila, Abruzzo
- Poggio Umbricchio, a frazione of Crognaleto, Teramo, Abruzzo
- Poggioreale, Naples, a quarter of Naples, Campania

=== Lakes and mountains ===
- Poggio Civitate, a hill in the commune of Murlo, Tuscany
- Poggio Sommorto, a mountain of the Marche
- Lago di Poggio Perotto a lake in the province of Grosseto, Tuscany

=== San Marino ===
- Poggio Casalino, a civil parish (curazia) of Chiesanuova
- Poggio Chiesanuova, a civil parish (curazia) of Chiesanuova

== Buildings and structures ==
- Poggio Reale (villa), a villa near Naples
- Poggioreale, the main cemetery of Naples
- Villa del Poggio Imperiale, a former grand ducal villa in Florence

== People ==
- Carla Del Poggio (1925–2010), Italian actress
- Febo di Poggio, Italian model associated with Michelangelo
- Poggio Bracciolini (1380–1459), Renaissance humanist
- Julieta Poggio (born 2002), Argentine model, actress and dance teacher
- Tomaso Poggio (born 1947), Italian-born neuroscientist
- Poggio Di Poggio (born 1968), contemporary minimalist artist. Inspired by nature and years of Buddhist monastic life, he creates paintings and sculptures that invite stillness. His artworks open spaces of silence, offering calm, reconnection, and a form of the sacredness. Publications: Monography 2016-2022, Odyssey

== Other ==
- Poggio II, a horse; see Equestrian at the 2004 Summer Olympics – Team eventing

== See also ==
- Poggi
