= Varagno =

Stream in the department of Haute-Corse, Corsica

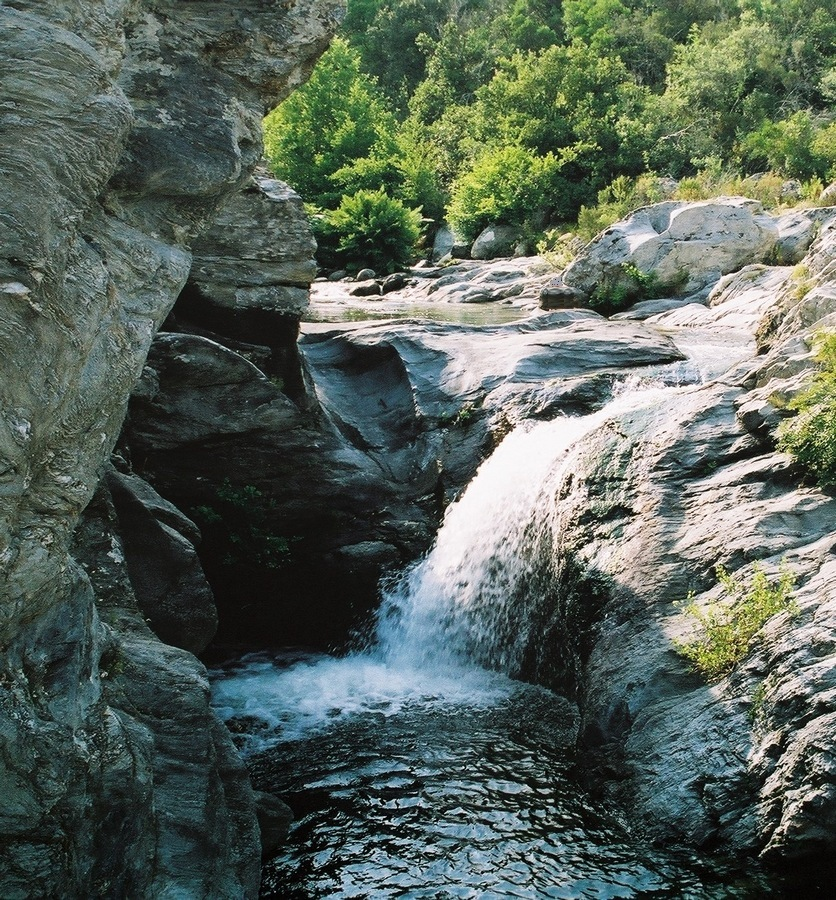
- The "devil's hole" on the Varagno

- Location within Corsica Location within France

Location
- Country: France
- Region: Corsica
- Department: Haute-Corse

Physical characteristics
- Mouth: Fiumorbo
  - coordinates: 42.0346°N 9.3665°E

Basin features
- Progression: Fiumorbo→ Tyrrhenian Sea

The Varagno (French: Ruisseau de ´Varagno) is a stream in the department of Haute-Corse, Corsica, France. It is a tributary of the Fiumorbo.

== Course ==
The Varagno is 16.78 kilometres (10.43 mi) long and flows through the communes of Isolaccio-di-Fiumorbo, Poggio-di-Nazza and Prunelli-di-Fiumorbo. The stream, known in its upper section as the Ruisseau d'Albarelli, rises to the east of the 1,769 metres (5,804 ft) Punta di Taoria. It flows southeast and then east past the village of Ajola, and continues east to its junction with the Fiumorbo to the northeast of the town of Ghisonaccia. It is crossed by the D44 near Ajola and by the D244 further down, but no roads follow its course.

== Environment ==
The Varagno flows through the Forêts du Fiumorbu, designated as a Zone naturelle d'intérêt écologique, faunistique et floristique (ZNIEFF). This includes the upper and middle watershed of the Abatesco and tributaries of the Fium'Orbu river such as the Saltaruccio and Varagno streams. The higher parts of the area are mainly covered with beech forest (Fagus sylvatica), birch groves, fir forests and laricio pines (Pinus nigra laricio). Lower down there are stands of maritime pines (Pinus pinaster) and holm oaks (Quercus ilex).

== Hydrology ==
The Varagno was observed at the Pont de Coty, where it is crossed by the D244, between May and September from 2012 to 2021. There was low visible flow in August 2012, 2013 and 2015, and in September 2015.

== Tributaries ==
The following streams (ruisseaux) are tributaries of the Varagno (ordered by length) and sub-tributaries:

- Agnone: 11 km (6.8 mi)
  - Debbione: 2 km (1.2 mi)
  - Carpinetti: 2 km (1.2 mi)
  - Chizzo: 2 km (1.2 mi)
- Nursoli: 6 km (3.7 mi)
  - Argentuccio: 2 km (1.2 mi)
  - Pincioni: 2 km (1.2 mi)
  - Giovanni: 1 km (0.62 mi)
- Stazzale: 4 km (2.5 mi)
- Alzone: 4 km (2.5 mi)
  - Conca: 1 km (0.62 mi)
- Pettinelli: 2 km (1.2 mi)
- Biciancola: 2 km (1.2 mi)
- Monte: 1 km (0.62 mi)
- Suartello: 1 km (0.62 mi)
- Ajola: 1 km (0.62 mi)
- Latelli: 1 km (0.62 mi)

== Sources ==
- "Le Varagno au pont de Coti", Observatoire national des étiages (in French), Office français de la biodiversité
- Moneglia, P.; Pastinelli, A.M., Forêts du Fiumorbu (PDF) (in French), Paris: INPN, SPN-MNHN
- "Relation: Ruisseau de Varagno (9719822)", OpenStreetMap
- "Ruisseau de Varagno", Sandre (in French)
