= Poggiale =

Poggiale is a French-Italian name derived as a diminutive form of Italian poggio for hill.

- Antoine Baudoin Poggiale (1808–1879), French chemist
- San Giorgio in Poggiale, Bologna

== See also ==
- Poggiali, a surname
