= Fiumorbo =

River in the department of Haute-Corse, Corsica

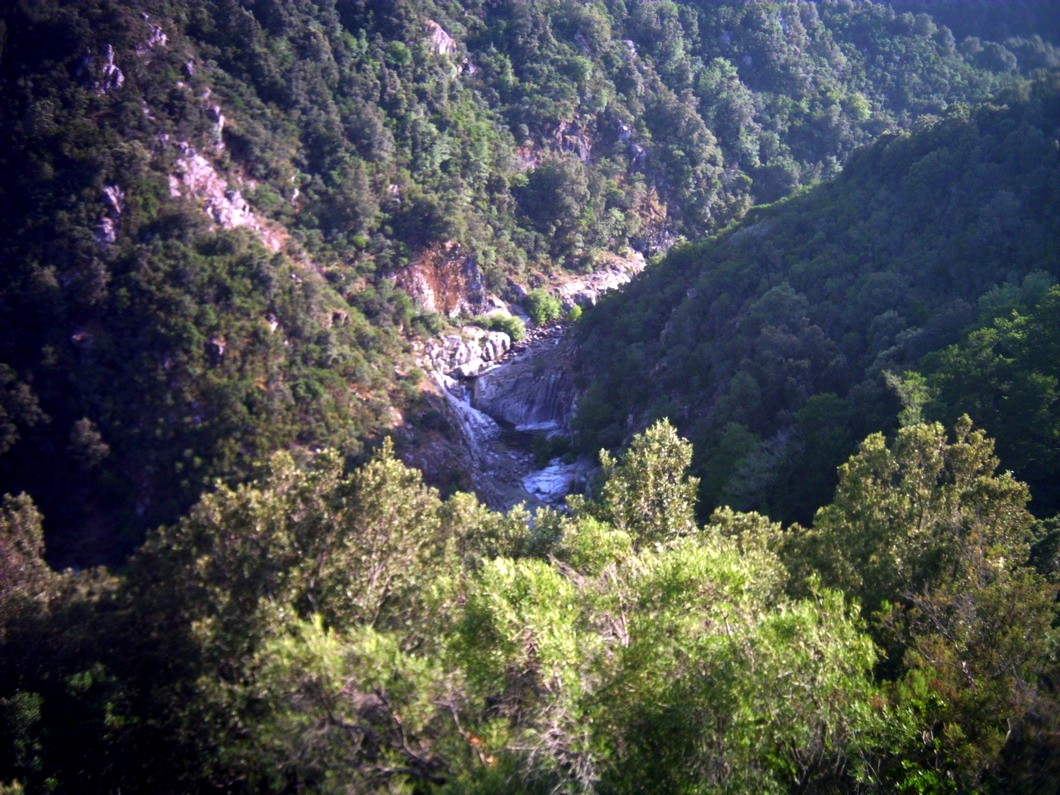
- Défilé des Strette below Ghisoni

- Location within Corsica Location within France
- Native name: U Fium'Orbu (Corsican)

Location
- Country: France
- Region: Corsica
- Department: Haute-Corse

Physical characteristics
- Mouth: Tyrrhenian Sea
  - coordinates: 41°59′16″N 9°26′24″E

The Fiumorbo (Corsican: U Fium'Orbu) is a coastal river in the department of Haute-Corse, Corsica, France. It is dammed in two places to supply irrigation water and hydroelectricity. Between the two dams it runs through the spectacular Défilé de l’Inzecca, a Natura 2000 site.

== Course ==
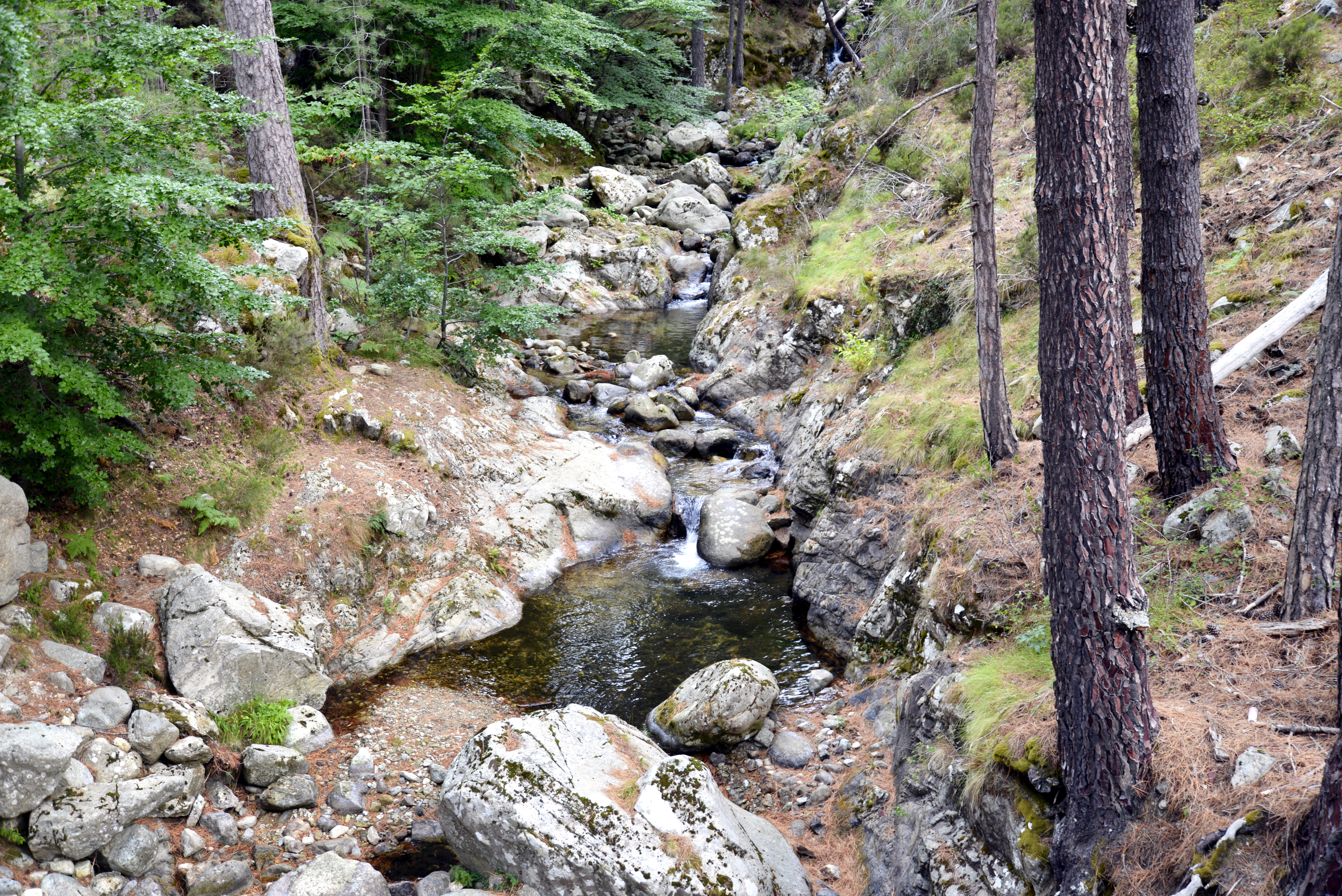
In the Canali forest, the Alzitone (or Regolo) stream upstream of the Canali bridge on the D69 road

The Fiumorbo is 45.64 kilometres (28.36 mi) long. It crosses the communes of Bastelica, Palneca, Ghisonaccia, Ghisoni, Lugo-di-Nazza, Poggio-di-Nazza, Prunelli-di-Fiumorbo and Serra-di-Fiumorbo.

The Fiumorbo rises in the commune of Palneca, Corse-du-sud, to the north of the 1,950 metres (6,400 ft) Monte Giovanni. It forms the border between Palneca and Bastelica as it flows north, then northeast, entering the commune of Ghisoni, Haute-Corse. It continues northeast and north through the Forêt de Marmano, then turns east to the hamlet of Sampolo, where it is dammed to form the Réservoir de Sampolo. Below the Barrage de Sampolo it flows east through the Défilé de l'Inzecca down to the coastal plain, where it is dammed by the Barrage de Trevadine. In this section it forms the border between Ghisoni and Lugo-di-Nazza.

Below the Barrage de Trevadine the river continues east to the commune of Ghisonaccia, then turns south, forming the border between Lugo-di-Nazza and Ghisonaccia, then between Poggio-di-Nazza and Ghisonaccia, and then between Prunelli-di-Fiumorbo and Ghisonaccia. It turns to the southeast, passes between the towns of Ghisonaccia and Migliacciaro, enters the sea to the northeast of the Marais de Canna, a wetland. In the Forêt de Marmano the D69 road runs to the west of the river. From Ghisoni down to Ghisonaccia the D344 road runs to the northeast of the river.

== Reservoirs ==
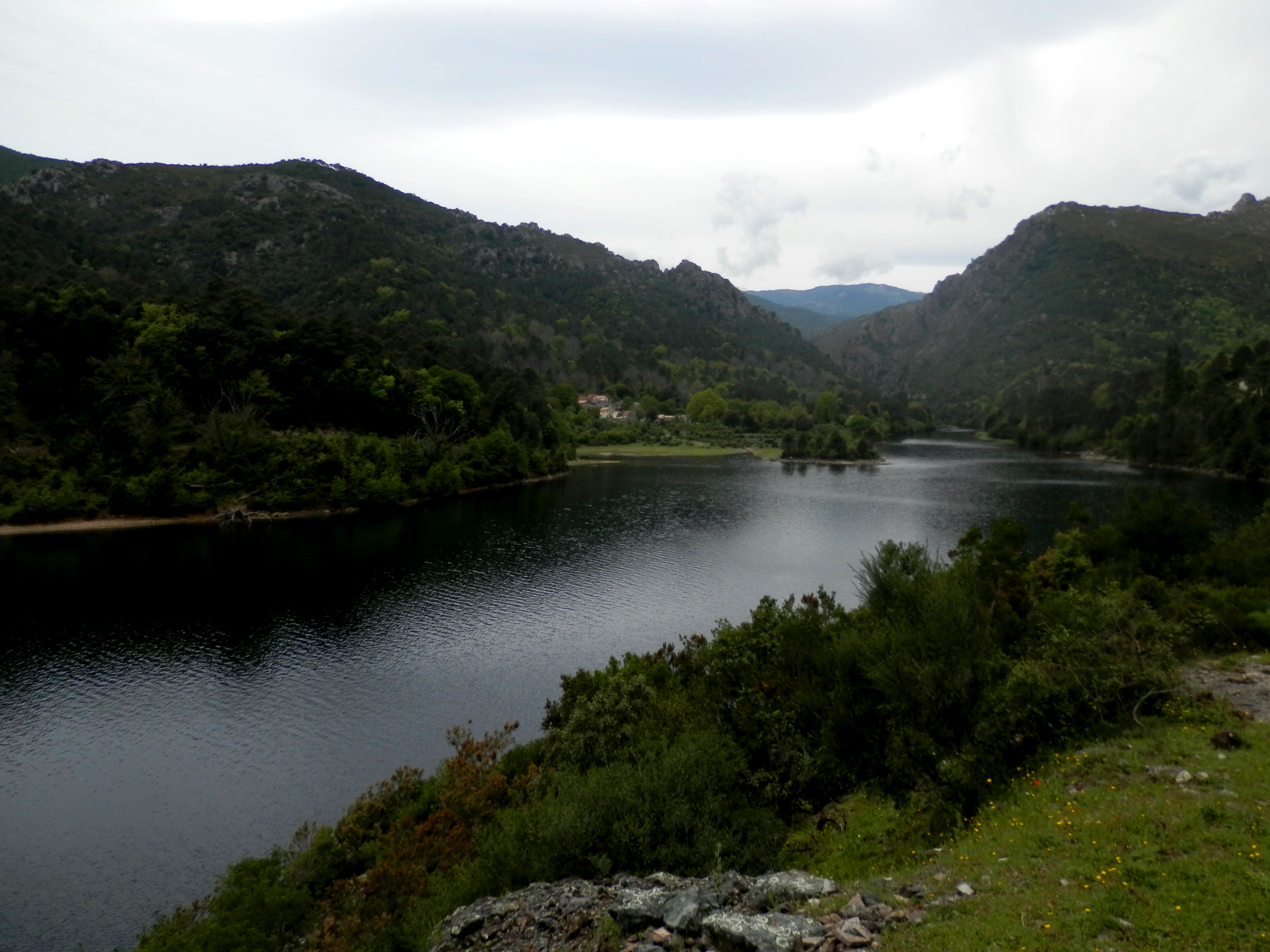
Sampolo reservoir

The Lac de Sampolo, or Réservoir de Sampolo, is formed by the Barrage du Sampolo, which dams the Fiumorbo river below the village of Sampolo. The dam was built between 1987 and 1991 and went into service in 1992. The concrete gravity dam is owned by Électricité de France (EDF) and is used for hydroelectricity and irrigation. It is 32.5 metres (107 ft) high and 93 metres (305 ft) long, with a crest elevation of 378 metres (1,240 ft) above sea level. The dam holds 2,000,000 cubic metres (71,000,000 cu ft) of water. It has a surface area of 24.5 hectares (61 acres) and a catchment area of 128 square kilometres (49 sq mi). The dam is checked regularly to confirm safety. Variations in the flow of the river downstream of the dams are controlled.

Below the site is another dam, the Barrage de Trévadine, where the river emerges onto the coastal plain. The Barrage de Trévadine came into service in 1991 and is also owned by EDF. It provides hydroelectricty and irrigation water. It is a concrete gravity dam 17 metres (56 ft) high and has a crest length of 145 metres (476 ft). The crest is at an altitude of 153 metres (502 ft). The reservoir covers 5 hectares (12 acres) and holds 247,000 cubic metres (8,700,000 cu ft) of water. The catchment area is 135 square kilometres (52 sq mi).

== Protected areas ==
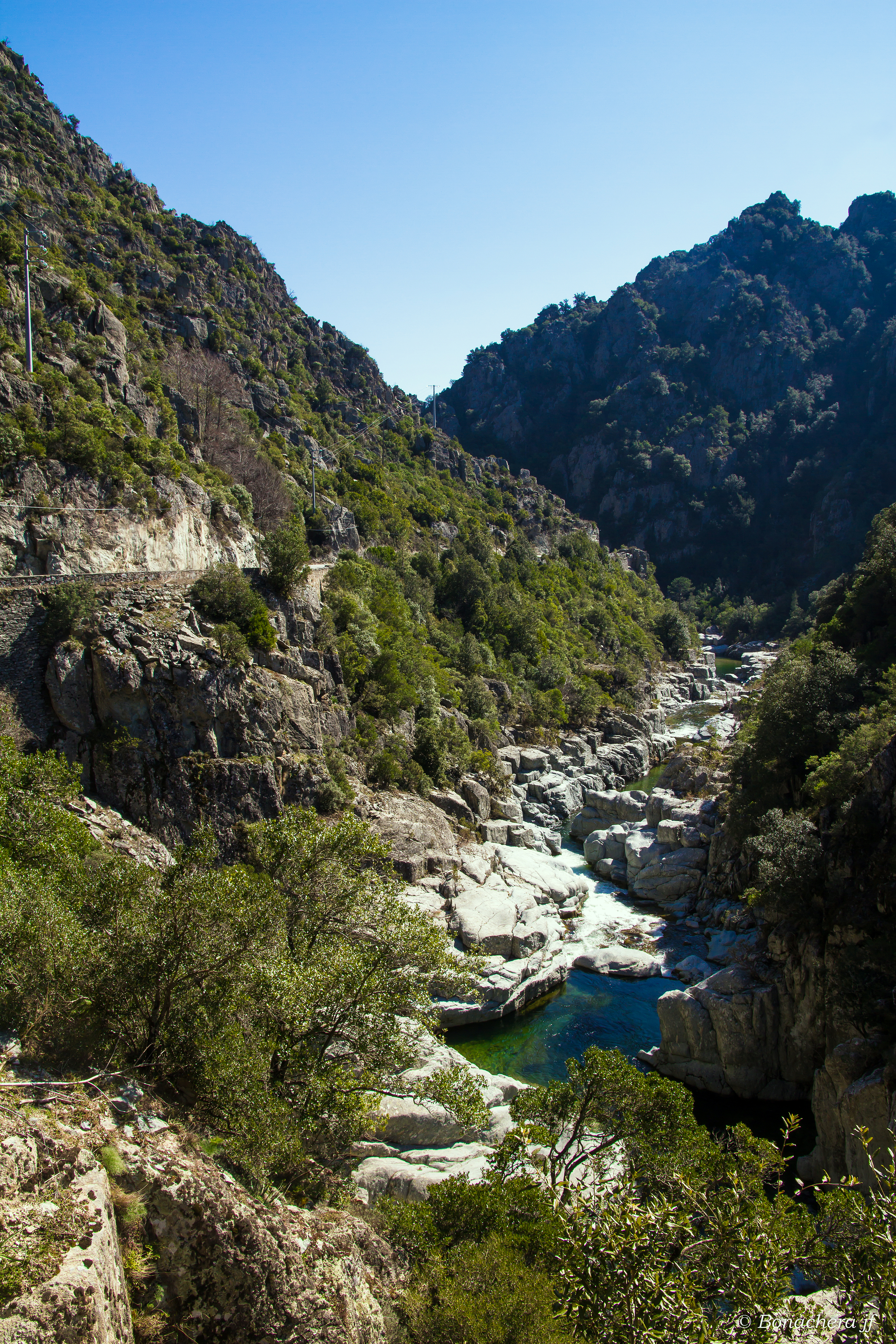
Défilé de l'Inzecca

Above and below the Sampolo dam the river has cut two series of rocky gorges. A small pool between the two has now been covered by the reservoir. The upper gorge, the Défilé des Strette, is less dramatic than the lower Défilé de l’Inzecca. The northern side of the Défilé de l’Inzecca is a Natura 2000 site. The Inzecca gorge has unique geological and floristic aspects found nowhere else in Corsica or France.

The Forets du Fiumorbu is classified as a Zone naturelle d'intérêt écologique, faunistique et floristique (ZNIEFF). This area overlooks the eastern coastal plain at Ghisonaccia. It encompasses the Territorial Forest of Fiumorbu, the Territorial Forest of Pietrapiana, the Communal Forest of Poggio di Nazza and the private forests that border the villages of Fiumorbu from San Gavino di Fiumorbu to Lugo di Nazza. Higher up the ZNIEFF is located on the eastern slope of the ridge separating it from the territorial forests of Sant'Antone and Marmano. The ZNIEFF includes the upper and middle watersheds of the Abatesco and some tributaries of the Fium'Orbu river such as the Saltaruccio and Varagno streams. The area is mainly covered with beech forest (Fagus sylvatica), birch groves, fir trees and laricio pines (Pinus nigra laricio) at high altitude. Lower down there are stands of maritime pines (Pinus pinaster) and holm oaks (Quercus ilex).

The coastline and wetlands from the mouth of the Fiumorbo southwest past the mouth of the Abatesco is classified as a ZNIEFF covering 161 hectares (400 acres). The lido (coastal sand dunes) is heavily used by tourists in the summer, particularly near recently built marinas in the northern half.

== Hydrology ==
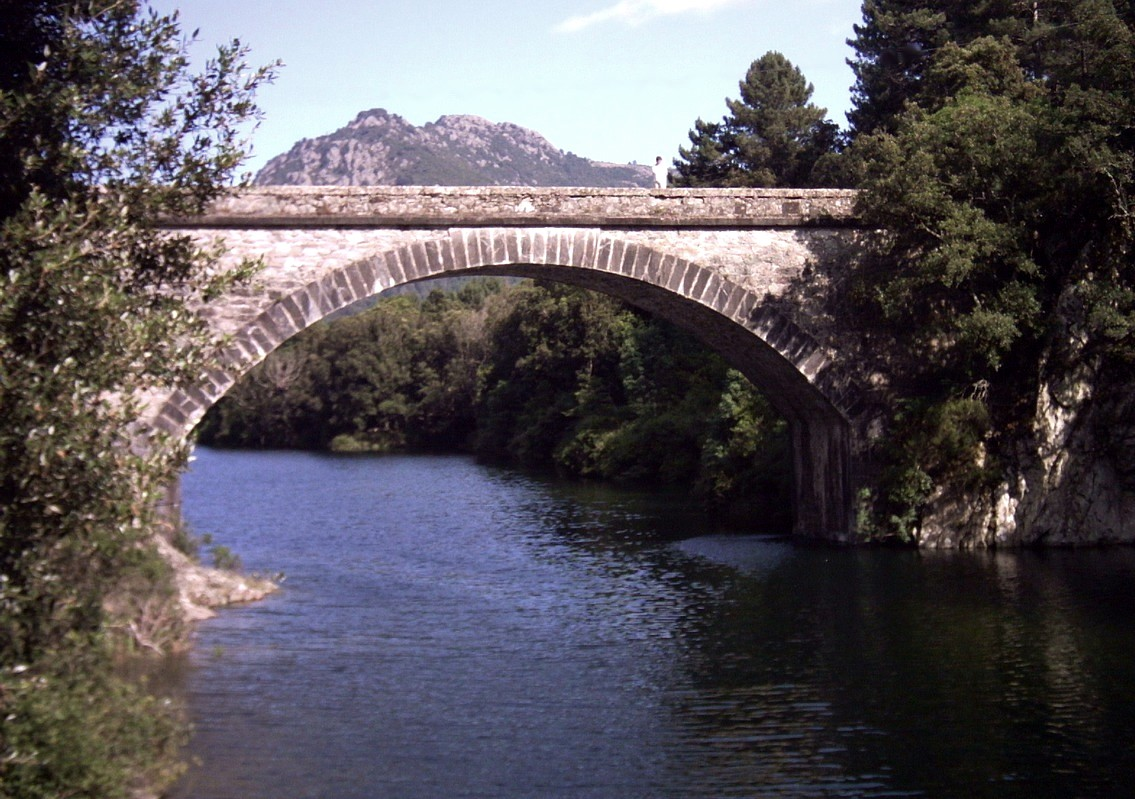
Sampolo bridge

Average flows have been measured at Ghisoni [Sampolo] between 1960 and 2021. This station is at an elevation of 378 metres (1,240 ft) above sea level. At this point the catchment covers 115 square kilometres (44 sq mi). The annual average is 3.730 cubic metres per second (131.7 cu ft/s). Monthly flows are:

Average flow (cubic meters per second) by month for the period 1960 to 2021
Month	Flow
Jan	4.900
Feb	5.350
Mar	5.390
Apr	5.880
May	5.470
Jun	2.740
Jul	1.150
Aug	0.711
Sep	0.921
Oct	1.900
Nov	4.690
Dec	5.790

== Tributaries ==
The following streams (ruisseaux) are tributaries of the Fiumorbo:

- Varagno: 17 kilometres (11 mi)
  - Agnone: 11 kilometres (6.8 mi)
    - Debbione: 2 kilometres (1.2 mi)
    - Carpinetti: 2 kilometres (1.2 mi)
    - Chizzo: 2 kilometres (1.2 mi)
  - Nursoli: 6 kilometres (3.7 mi)
    - Argentuccio: 2 kilometres (1.2 mi)
    - Pincioni: 2 kilometres (1.2 mi)
    - Giovanni: 1 kilometre (0.62 mi)
  - Stazzale: 4 kilometres (2.5 mi)
  - Alzone: 4 kilometres (2.5 mi)
    - Conca: 1 kilometre (0.62 mi)
  - Pettinelli: 2 kilometres (1.2 mi)
  - Biciancola: 2 kilometres (1.2 mi)
  - Monte: 1 kilometre (0.62 mi)
  - Suartello: 1 kilometre (0.62 mi)
  - Ajola: 1 kilometre (0.62 mi)
  - Latelli: 1 kilometre (0.62 mi)
- Saltaruccio: 15 kilometres (9.3 mi)
  - Poletrella: 4 kilometres (2.5 mi)
  - Buoni Pargoli: 4 kilometres (2.5 mi)
  - Sambuchi: 3 kilometres (1.9 mi)
  - Ternale: 2 kilometres (1.2 mi)
  - Caniozzo: 2 kilometres (1.2 mi)
  - Pane Casciolo: 2 kilometres (1.2 mi)
  - Salto Leandro: 2 kilometres (1.2 mi)
  - Nevalpiana: 1 kilometre (0.62 mi)
- Ruello: 9 kilometres (5.6 mi)
  - Galgaccio: 4 kilometres (2.5 mi)
    - Nebbia: 4 kilometres (2.5 mi)
  - Tiglio: 3 kilometres (1.9 mi)
    - Giuncutello: 1 kilometre (0.62 mi)
  - Susinelle: 3 kilometres (1.9 mi)
  - Zuccarello: 2 kilometres (1.2 mi)
- Regolo: 8 kilometres (5.0 mi)
  - Alzitone: 3 kilometres (1.9 mi)
  - Vadina: 3 kilometres (1.9 mi)
  - Assatojo: 2 kilometres (1.2 mi)
- Chigheri: 7 kilometres (4.3 mi)
  - Giargalozeo: 2 kilometres (1.2 mi)
    - Scarpaceja: 3 kilometres (1.9 mi)
  - Rodi Mela: 2 kilometres (1.2 mi)
  - Pruno: 1 kilometre (0.62 mi)
- Serracinella: 6 kilometres (3.7 mi)
- Casso: 5 kilometres (3.1 mi)
  - Tomba: 4 kilometres (2.5 mi)
  - Forno: 2 kilometres (1.2 mi)
- Cannareccia: 5 kilometres (3.1 mi)
  - Lischetto: 4 kilometres (2.5 mi)
- Forno: 4 kilometres (2.5 mi)
- Casa Calva: 4 kilometres (2.5 mi)
  - Petrapola: 4 kilometres (2.5 mi)
- Casillilli: 4 kilometres (2.5 mi)
  - Camelle: 2 kilometres (1.2 mi)
- Monte Grosso: 4 kilometres (2.5 mi)
  - Sampolo: 2 kilometres (1.2 mi)
- Giargolo: 3 kilometres (1.9 mi)
- Alzitana: 3 kilometres (1.9 mi)
- Vaglie: 3 kilometres (1.9 mi)
- Alzeta: 3 kilometres (1.9 mi)
  - Cortina: 2 kilometres (1.2 mi)
- Trevadine: 3 kilometres (1.9 mi)
  - Tavone: 1 kilometre (0.62 mi)
- Rosse: 3 kilometres (1.9 mi)
- Ariola: 3 kilometres (1.9 mi)
- Rivusecco: 3 kilometres (1.9 mi)
- Pedivaldo: 3 kilometres (1.9 mi)
- Tibiani Bujosa: 3 kilometres (1.9 mi)
  - Casetta: 2 kilometres (1.2 mi)
- Arresto: 2 kilometres (1.2 mi)
- Ciuntrone: 2 kilometres (1.2 mi)
- Grotta del Prete: 2 kilometres (1.2 mi)
- Sampolo: 2 kilometres (1.2 mi)
- Guado Alla Macchia: 2 kilometres (1.2 mi)
- Olmiccia: 2 kilometres (1.2 mi)
- Radicello: 2 kilometres (1.2 mi)
  - Lattugona: 1 kilometre (0.62 mi)
- Tramonte: 2 kilometres (1.2 mi)
- Occhio-Griggio: 2 kilometres (1.2 mi)
- Capanella: 2 kilometres (1.2 mi)
- Paganello: 1 kilometre (0.62 mi)
  - Finosa: 3 kilometres (1.9 mi)
- Puralbello: 1 kilometre (0.62 mi)
- Scarrone: 1 kilometre (0.62 mi)
- Paglione: 1 kilometre (0.62 mi)
- Zoppi: 1 kilometre (0.62 mi)
- Roncatojo: 1 kilometre (0.62 mi)
  - Campo Piano: 2 kilometres (1.2 mi)

== Gallery ==
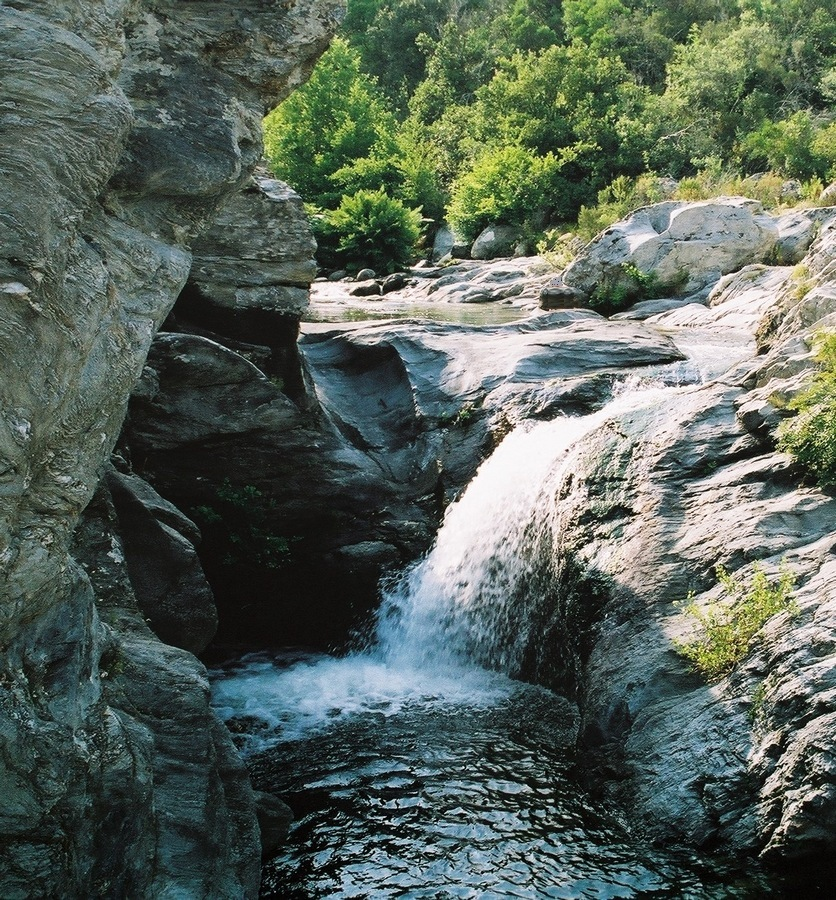
The "trou du diable" on the Varagno tributary

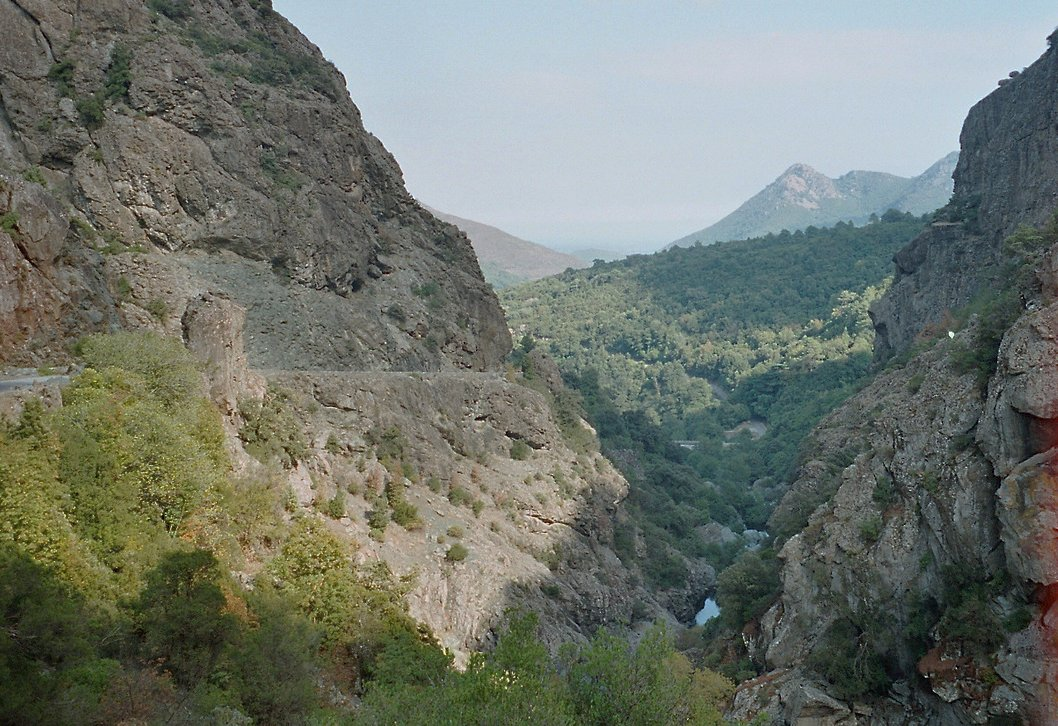
Défilé de l'Inzecca

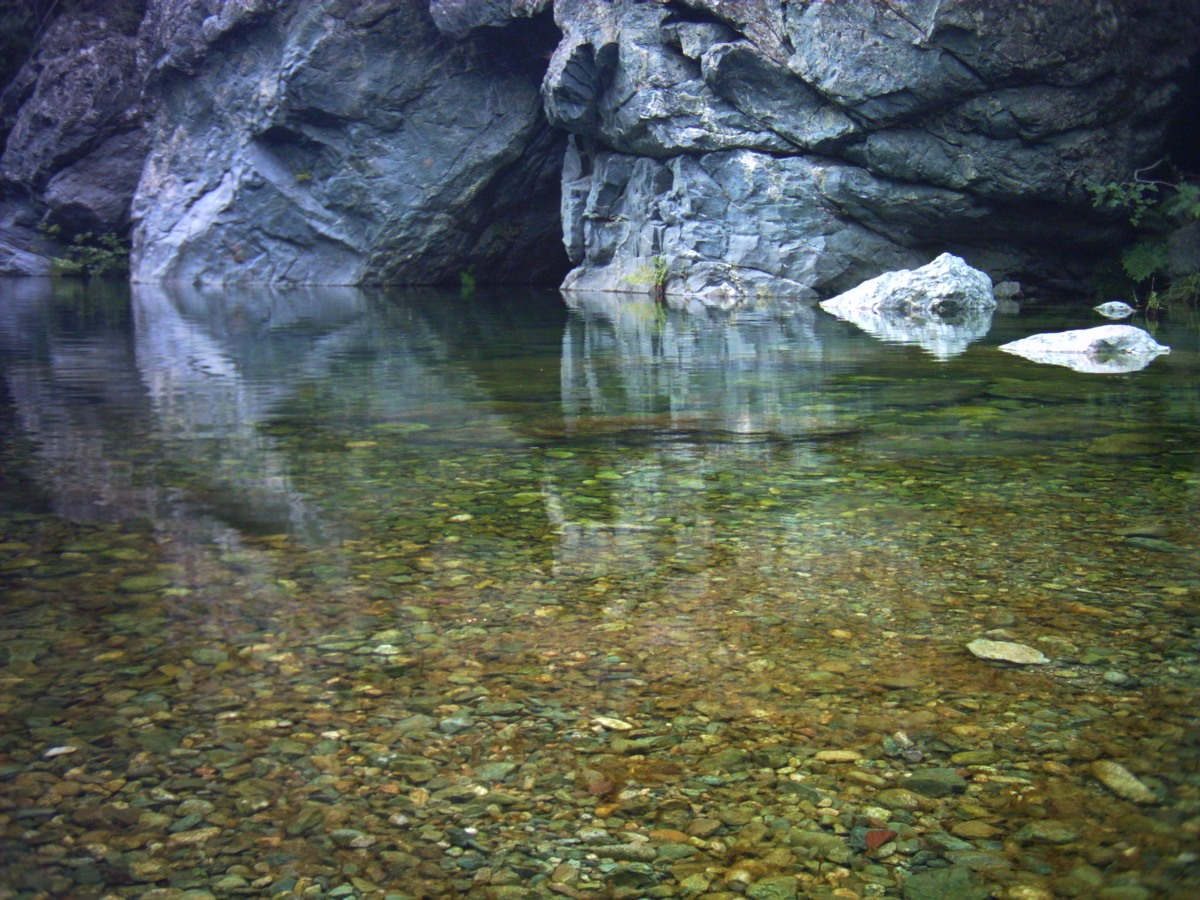
Calm water on the Fiumorbo upstream of the Pinzalone bridge

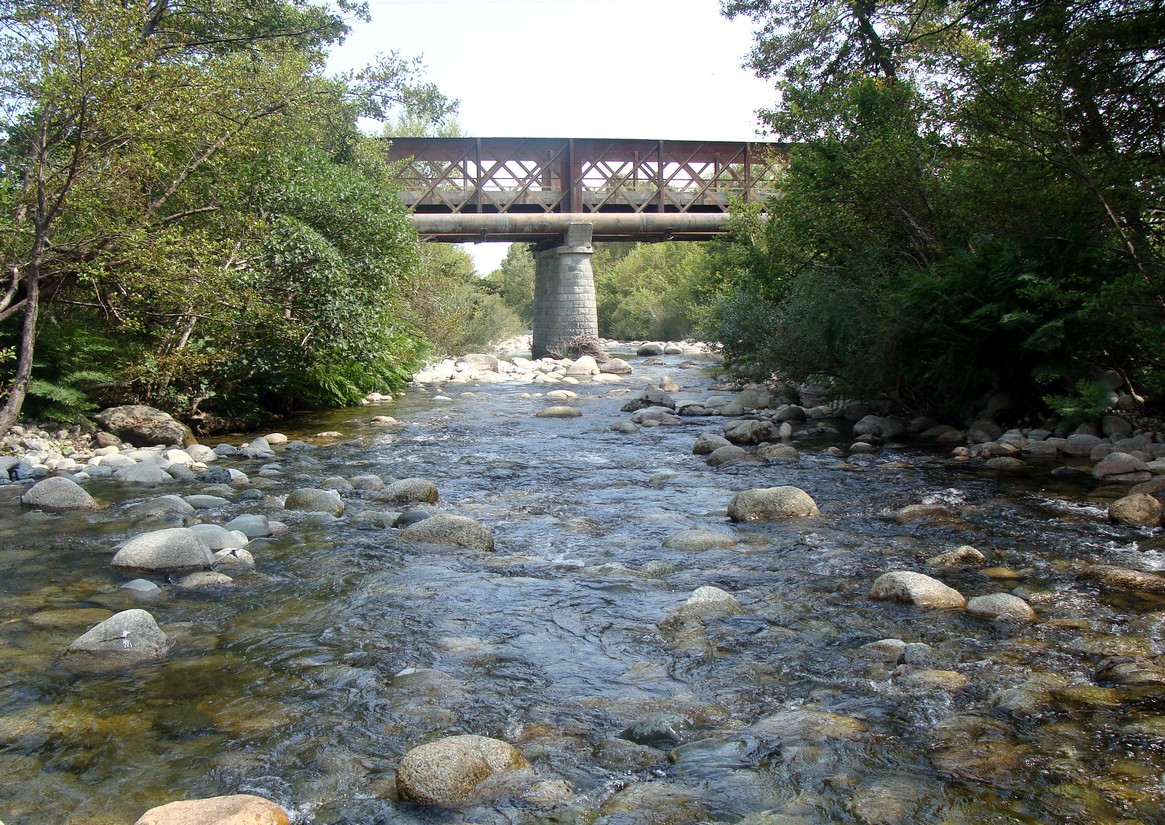
Viaduct of Fiumorbo

== Sources ==
- Corse : Barrage de Sampolo (in French), Comité Français des Barrages et Réservoirs
- Corse : Barrage de Trévadine (in French), Comité Français des Barrages et Réservoirs
- "Le Fium-Orbo à Ghisoni [Sampolo]", eaufrance (in French), Ministère de l'Ecologie, du Développement Durable et de l'Energie
- Loïc Ardiet (22 January 2010), Site Natura 2000 « Defile de l'Inzecca » (PDF) (in French), Biotope
- "Relation: Fiumorbo (2999740)", OpenStreetMap
- "u Fium'Orbu", Sandre (in French)
- "Way: Barrage du Sampolo (26842087)", OpenStreetMap
- "ZNIEFF 940004090 Embouchures et zones humides du Fium'Orbu et de l'Abatesco", Inventaire national du patrimoine naturel (INPN) (in French)
- "ZNIEFF 940004157 Forets du Fiumorbu", Inventaire national du patrimoine naturel (INPN) (in French)
