= Poggioreale =

Poggioreale or Poggio reale may refer to:

- Poggio Reale (villa), a royal summer residence in Naples
- Poggioreale, Naples, a neighbourhood of Naples, Italy
  - Cemetery of Poggioreale
  - Poggioreale railway station
  - Poggioreale station, a planned metro station
- Poggioreale, Trapani, a ghost town in Sicily, Italy

== See also ==
- Poggio (disambiguation)
