= Trévadine Reservoir =

Reservoir on Corsica, France

- Location within Corsica Location within France
- Location: Haute-Corse, Corsica
- Coordinates: 42.09321°N 9.31744°E
- Type: Reservoir
- Basin countries: France

Trévadine Reservoir (French: Réservoir de Trévadine, Retenue de Trévadine) is a reservoir in the Haute-Corse department of France, on the island of Corsica. It stores water for drinking and irrigation, which is fed to reservoirs in the coastal plain.

== Dam ==
The Trévadine Reservoir is in the commune of Ghisoni. The dam impounds the Fiumorbo river below the Sampolo Reservoir and the Défilé de l'Inzecca. The D344 road passes its northeast shore. The dam is owned and operated by Électricité de France (EDF), and came into service in 1991. The gravity dam is 17 metres (56 ft) high and 145 metres (476 ft) long, with a crest elevation of 153 metres (502 ft). It impounds 247,000 cubic metres (8,700,000 cu ft) of water. The reservoir covers 5 hectares (12 acres). It is fed from a drainage basin of 135 square kilometres (52 sq mi).

The 44 MW Trévadine hydroelectric plant, which receives water from the Sampolo Reservoir, discharges into the south of the Trévadine Reservoir. The plant and the downstream water reservoir have been the main economic driver for the village of Lugo-di-Nazza to the south.

== Operations ==
The reservoir supplies water to the reservoirs in the plain: the 2,350,000 cubic metres (83,000,000 cu ft) Bacciana Reservoir, the 4,300,000 cubic metres (150,000,000 cu ft) (Note: The 2020 report on Travaux de sécurisation du site d’Alzitone gives the capacity of the Teppe Rosse reservoir as 2,300,000 cubic metres (81,000,000 cu ft). This is inconsistent with other sources that give the capacity as 4,300,000 cubic metres (150,000,000 cu ft) or 4,350,000 cubic metres (154,000,000 cu ft).) Teppe Rosse Reservoir and the 5,500,000 cubic metres (190,000,000 cu ft) Alzitone Reservoir. The reservoirs in turn deliver water using gravity.

In winter an outlet in the Trévadine Reservoir supplies an 800 millimetres (31 in) above-ground steel pipe that runs for a distance of 7.5 kilometres (4.7 mi) to the reservoirs of Alzitone, Teppe Rosse and Bacciana. It is able to carry about 0.9 cubic metres (32 cu ft) per second. Downstream a network of distribution pipes carries water to users in the municipalities of Prunelli-di-Fiumorbo, Serra-di-Fiumorbo, Ventiseri and Solaro.

About 900 litres per second (32 cu ft/s) of water is taken from the Fium'Orbu in winter with occasional peaks of as much as 1,200 litres per second (42 cu ft/s). In summer the Fium'Orbu continue to supply 250 to 400 litres per second (8.8 to 14.1 cu ft/s) to the reservoirs, but delivery of water to users requires operation of pumping stations.

== Ecology ==
The reservoir has low biological significance. Flora include Montpellier cistus (Cistus monspeliensis), yellow flatsedge (Cyperus flavescens), wild carrot (Daucus carota), yellow fleabane (Dittrichia viscosa), black poplar (Populus nigra) and rough cocklebur (Xanthium strumarium).

== Sources ==
- August Marine (2020), Lugo-di-Nazza (in French)
- Corse : Barrage de Teppe Rosse (in French), CFBR Comité Français des Barrages et Réservoirs
- Corse : Barrage de Trévadine (in French), CFBR Comité Français des Barrages et Réservoirs
- Dossier d'utilité publique du Fium'orbu (PDF) (in French), OEHC
- FR835COR458 - Lac de barrage de Trévadine, PIM Initiative, Corsican Environment Office (OEC), 2019
- Le Système Électrique Corse (in French), CEAC, 30 January 2019
- Travaux de sécurisation du site d'Alzitone (PDF) (in French), Office d'Équipement Hydraulique de Corse, 2020
- "Way: Réservoir de Trévadine (26841546)", OpenStreetMap
