= Capoterra =

Capoterra Cabuderra (Sardinian)
- Comune
- Comune di Capoterra
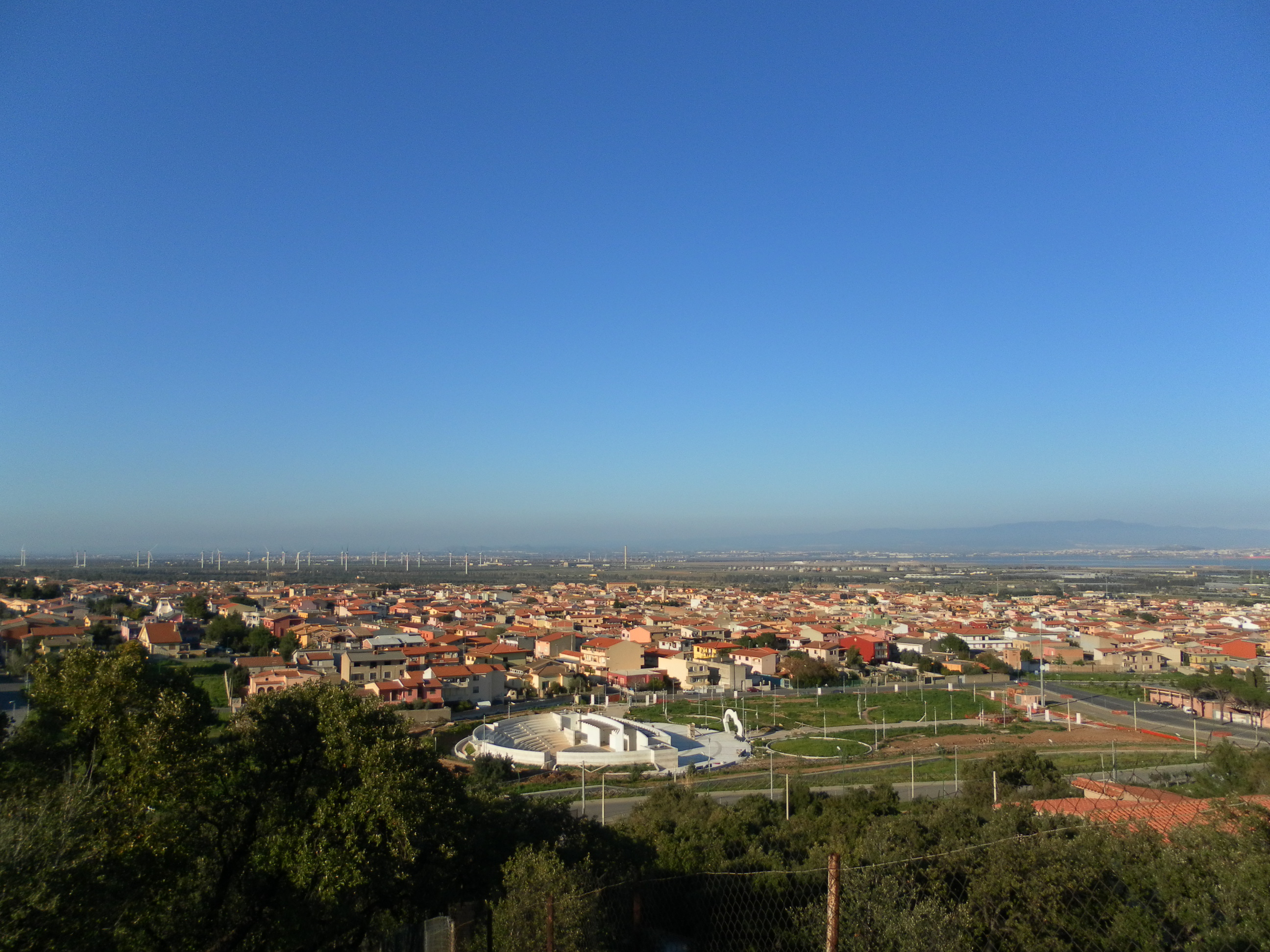
- Panorama of Capoterra

- Coat of arms

- Location within Sardinia
- Coordinates: 39°10′28″N 8°58′16″E
- Country: Italy
- Region: Sardinia
- Metropolitan city: Cagliari (CA)
- Frazioni: Poggio dei Pini, La Maddalena, Frutti d'Oro, San Leone, Torre degli Ulivi, Su Spantu, Rio San Girolamo, Rio Santa Lucia, Sa Perda Su Gattu, Su Spantu

Government
  - Mayor: Beniamino Garau

Area
  - Total: 68.49 km^{2} (26.44 sq mi)
- Elevation: 54 m (177 ft)

Population (2025)
  - Total: 23,088
  - Density: 337.1/km^{2} (873.1/sq mi)
- Demonym: Capoterrese(i)
- Time zone: UTC+1 (CET)
  - Summer (DST): UTC+2 (CEST)
- Postal code: 09012
- Dialing code: 070
- Patron saint: Sant'Efisio
- Saint day: 15 January
- Website: Official website

Capoterra (Italian: [kapoˈtɛrra]: Sardinian: Cabuderra [kaβuˈðɛra]; from Latin Caput Terrae, "head of the Earth") is a town and comune (municipality) in the Metropolitan City of Cagliari, Sardinia, Italy. It has 23,088 inhabitants.

It is located on the western arm of the Golfo degli Angeli, about 15 kilometres (9 mi) from Cagliari. Economy is mostly based on services, although the tourism sector has grown notably in the past decades.

== Etymology ==
The name of the town derives from the Latin Caput terrae: in Roman times, the urban centre (perhaps an oppidum) developed near the lagoon. In the Judicial period, it was a villa of the curatorate of Nora and, from 1120, of the giudicato of Cagliari. After passing to the Pisan seigniory and later the Aragonese conquest, the town was destroyed and uninhabited for three centuries. Until the mid-seventeenth century when Baron Girolamo Torrelas decided to repopulate it, granting families from other parts of Sardinia plots of land and 'good conditions' to escape pendencies with the minor justice system.

Within the town, the parish church of Sant'Efisio, the town's patron saint, whose original nucleus was not by chance called Villa sant'Efisio, stands out for its history and tradition. Identity and legend materialise in the Romanesque church of santa Barbara de Montes, erected on the eastern slopes of the Capoterra mountains. Fifty metres from the church, Basilian monks built a chapel, where it is said that the martyr Barbara was beheaded during the Christian persecution. The head, falling off, is said to have originated a spring, still active today, sa Scabizzada (the beheaded). The area around it became the summer residence of Cagliari families in the 20th century.

== History ==
Extending at the foot of Mount Arcosu and bathed by the Cagliari pond - known as Santa Gilla - Capoterra is a centre of about 23,000 inhabitants on the south-western outskirts of the capital of Sardinia. In its vast territory, inhabited since pre-Nuragic times, nature and history intertwine. On the Arcosu there are enchanting and remarkable landscapes, almost four thousand hectares of forest, with a 'heart' of holm oaks and cork oaks, surrounded by Mediterranean scrub, where Sardinian deer and fallow deer roam undisturbed. The park is irrigated by streams and waterfalls. Within the 1300 hectares of the Cagliari lagoon, one of Europe's most important avifauna oases, is the Capoterra pond, where flamingos and black-winged stilts can be observed. Nearby, at Cuccuru Ibba, there are traces dating back to the Neolithic period: a lithic workshop and circular huts. In various localities, there are ruins from the Nuragic period, necropolis and towers, in particular the Monti Arrubiu nuraghe. A settlement at su Loi and a necropolis at Sant'Antonio date back to the Punic period (5th-4th century B.C.). From history to astrophysics: in the hills near the hamlet of Poggio dei Pini stands the astronomical observatory frequented by international teams of scientists.

== Demographics ==
Historical population

Year	Pop.	±%
1861	1,151	—
1871	1,244	+8.1%
1881	1,429	+14.9%
1901	1,780	+24.6%
1911	2,318	+30.2%
1921	2,831	+22.1%
1931	3,228	+14.0%
1936	3,710	+14.9%

Year	Pop.	±%
1951	4,820	+29.9%
1961	6,355	+31.8%
1971	8,028	+26.3%
1981	12,208	+52.1%
1991	16,428	+34.6%
2001	21,391	+30.2%
2011	23,255	+8.7%
2021	23,235	−0.1%

Source: ISTAT

== Twin towns ==
- Peschiera del Garda, Italy

== See also ==
- Cagliari metropolitan area
