= Poggiali =

Poggiali is an Italian surname. Notable people with the surname include:

- Manuel Poggiali (born 1983), Sanmarinese motorcycle racer
- Roberto Poggiali (born 1941), Italian cyclist

== See also ==
- 39864 Poggiali, main-belt minor planet
- Poggioli
