= Sampolo Reservoir =

- Lavu di Sampolu (Corsican)
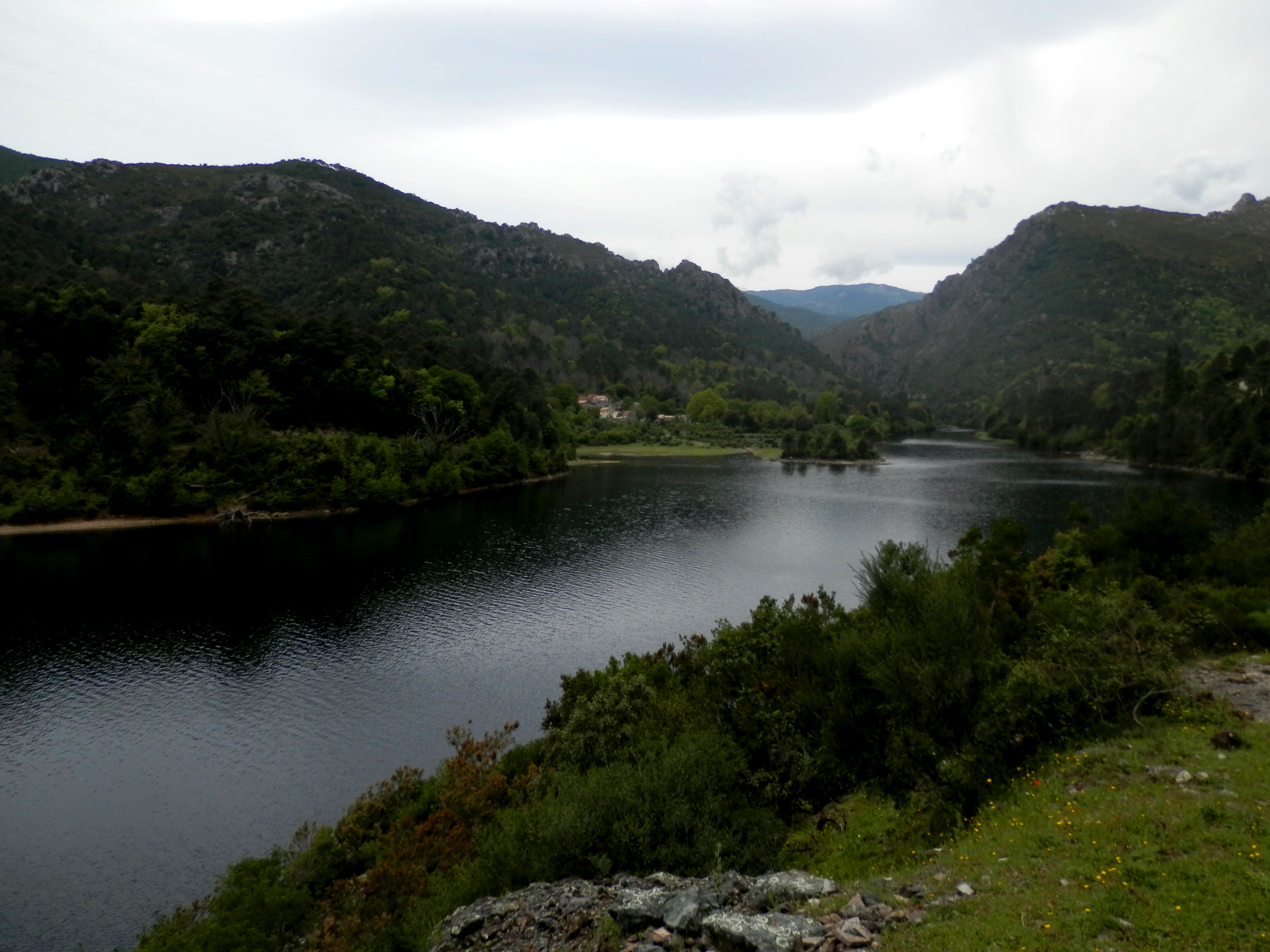
- Lake and village of Sampolo

- Location within Corsica Location within France
- Location: Corsica
- Coordinates: 42°05′45″N 9°16′43″E
- Type: Reservoir
- Primary inflows: Fiumorbo
- Primary outflows: Fiumorbo
- Basin countries: France

The Sampolo Reservoir (French: Réservoir de Sampolo, Corsican: Lavu di Sampolu) is a reservoir in the Haute-Corse department of Corsica, France. It is formed by damming the Fiumorbo (or Fium'Orbu) river by the Barrage du Sampolo. The reservoir provides hydroelectricity and water for irrigation. The gallery of the dam is home to important bat colonies.

== Location ==
The Lac de Sampolo, or Réservoir de Sampolo, is formed by the Barrage du Sampolo, which dams the Fiumorbo river below the village of Sampolo. The dam and east end of the reservoir are in the commune of Lugo-di-Nazza. The remainder of the reservoir is in the commune of Ghisoni. The D344 road from Ghisonaccia to Ghisoni runs along the north shore. The dam is just above the gorge named the Défilé de l’Inzecca, a Natura 2000 site. Below the site is another dam, the Barrage de Trévadine, where the river emerges onto the coastal plain.

== Hydrology ==
The dam was built between 1987 and 1991 and went into service in 1992. The concrete gravity dam is owned by Électricité de France (EDF) and is used for hydroelectricity and irrigation. It is 32.5 metres (107 ft) high and 93 metres (305 ft) long, with a crest elevation of 378 metres (1,240 ft) above sea level. The dam holds 2,000,000 cubic metres (71,000,000 cu ft) of water. It has a surface area of 24.5 hectares (61 acres) and a catchment area of 128 square kilometres (49 sq mi). The dam is checked regularly to confirm safety. Variations in the flow of the river downstream of the dams are controlled.

== Fish ==
As of 2010 a fishing lodge was planned in the village of Sampolo. The reservoir can be fished for trout, eel and common barbel.

== Bats ==
As of 2010 the dam cornice was home to a colony of 50 common pipistrelle (Pipistrellus pipistrellus) bats. The technical gallery of the dam is one of Corsica's major bat lodges, frequented by five species that number more than 3,000 individuals. These include about 100 long-fingered bats (Myotis capaccinii). Common bent-wing bats (Miniopterus schreibersi) are present in large numbers in the gallery, and greater noctule bats (Nyctalus lasiopterus) are also present. The bats fly down the gorge to their nocturnal hunting sites in the coastal lagoons, wetlands and forests. As of 2010 the bats were vulnerable to accidental or deliberate changes to their lodging place.

== Sources ==
- Corse : Barrage de Sampolo (in French), Comité Français des Barrages et Réservoirs
- Loïc Ardiet (22 January 2010), Site Natura 2000 « Defile de l'Inzecca » (PDF) (in French), Biotope
- "Way: Barrage du Sampolo (26842087)", OpenStreetMap
