= Tagnone =

River in the department of Haute-Corse, Corsica

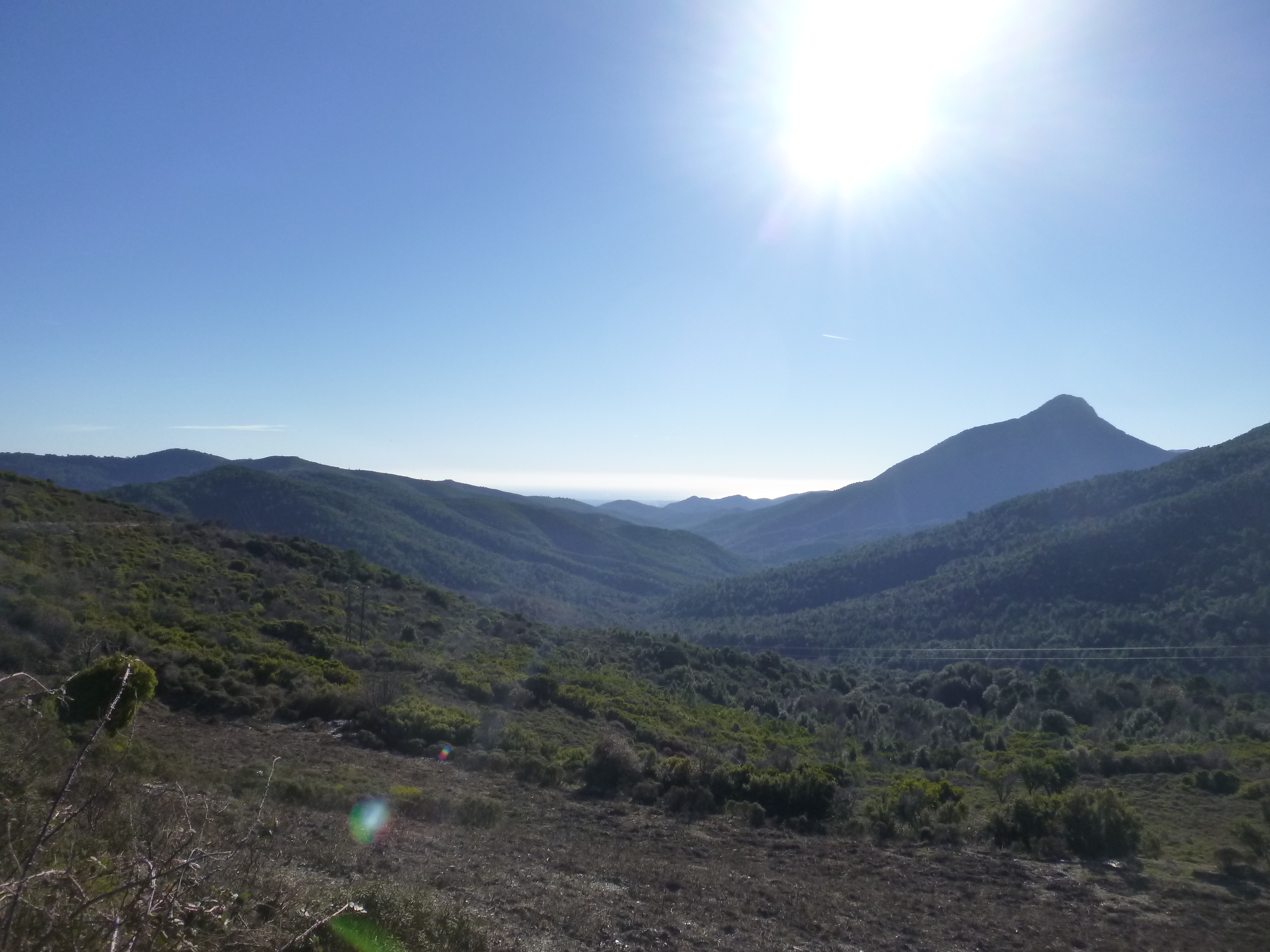
- Tagnone valley

- Location within Corsica Location within France

Location
- Country: France
- Region: Corsica
- Department: Haute-Corse

Physical characteristics
- Mouth: Tavignano
  - location: Aléria
  - coordinates: 42.10454°N 9.50606°E

Basin features
- Progression: Tavignano→ Tyrrhenian Sea

The Tagnone is a small river in the department of Haute-Corse, Corsica, France. It is a tributary of the river Tavignano.

== Course ==
The Tagnone is 35.14 kilometres (21.83 mi) long. It crosses the communes of Aghione, Aléria, Pietroso and Vezzani. The Tagnone rises in the commune of Vezzani to the northeast of the 1,532 metres (5,026 ft) Punta Paglia. It run east past the village of Vezzani, then runs in a generally southeast direction to its confluence with the Tavignano south of Aléria, near the mouth of the Tavignano on the Tyrrhenian Sea. The D343 road follows the Tagnone for much of its course.

== Valley ==
The Tagnone valley lies between the Tavignanu and Fium'Orbu valleys. It is smaller than these valleys and more isolated. The head of the valley is the ridge that connects the 824 metres (2,703 ft) Punta della Pinghella to the 1,524 metres (5,000 ft) Punta Paglia. To the north the valley is flanked by relatively low slopes. To the south it is separated from the Fium'Orbu valley by a line of heights that are above 1,000 metres (3,300 ft) high until the edge of the coastal plain. The villages of Vezzani and Pietroso cling to the slopes in the upper part of the narrow valley.

The environment on the north-facing slopes favors forestry, and laricio pines of the Rospa-Sorba national forest grow on the foothills of Punta Paglia above the villages. The valley floor is not wide and flat enough for agriculture, which is confined to terraces around Vezzani, Pietroso and a few hamlets. The slopes and river banks are covered by maquis shrubland. There are some traces of copper mining beside the RD343.

== Hydrology ==
The river has been measured at Aghione [Pont RD443] from 2018 to 2021. At this point it has a basin of 66 square kilometres (25 sq mi). The maximum instantaneous flow was recorded on 1 November 2018 as 67.7 cubic metres per second (2,390 cu ft/s). The maximum daily flow was record on 24 January 2020 as 16.3 cubic metres per second (580 cu ft/s).

== Tributaries ==
The following streams (ruisseaux) are tributaries of the Tagnone (ordered by length) and sub-tributaries:

- Codolo 9 km (5.6 mi)
- Puzzichello 8 km (5.0 mi)
  - Spallina 2 km (1.2 mi)
  - Caselle 2 km (1.2 mi)
  - Don Carlo 1 km (0.62 mi)
- La Bacciana 7 km (4.3 mi)
  - San Salvadore 2 km (1.2 mi)
- Barello 4 km (2.5 mi)
  - Alziccia 2 km (1.2 mi)
- Botte 4 km (2.5 mi)
- Santa Maria 4 km (2.5 mi)
- Samuleto 4 km (2.5 mi)
- Aghione 3 km (1.9 mi)
- Forcalo 3 km (1.9 mi)
- Pietra Piana 3 km (1.9 mi)
- Le Vieux Tagnone 3 km (1.9 mi)
- Forci 2 km (1.2 mi)
- Lojani 2 km (1.2 mi)
- Bicolani 2 km (1.2 mi)
- Catastajo 2 km (1.2 mi)
- Vetrice 2 km (1.2 mi)
- Affitte 1 km (0.62 mi)

== Sources ==
- "3.12 - Vallées du Tavignanu, de Tagnone et de Fium'Orbu", Atlas des paysages de la region Corse (PDF) (in French), Direction régionale de l’environnement, de l’aménagement et du logement, 2013
- "Le Tagnone à Aghione [Pont RD443]", eaufrance (in French), Ministère de l'Ecologie, du Développement Durable et de l'Energie
- "Le Tagnone", Sandre (in French)
- "Relation: Le Tagnone (7391161)", OpenStreetMap
