= Poggio dei Pini =

Coordinates: 39°09′0″N 8°58′10″E

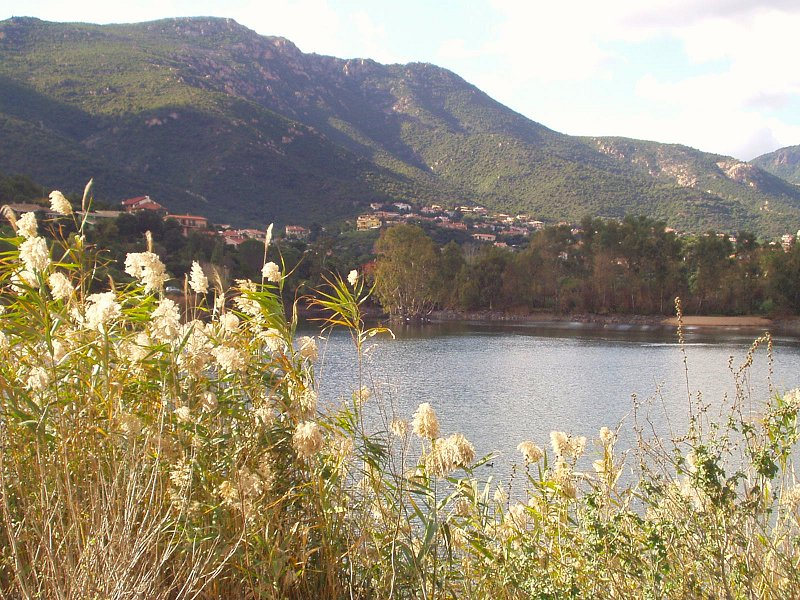
Poggio dei Pini

Poggio dei Pini, literally “Pine Knoll” is a locality situated in south-west Sardinia, about 15 km from Cagliari, the island's capital. It is a frazione of the municipality Capoterra.

The village, with about 4,000 inhabitants, is of a type unique in Sardinia, and unusual in Italy. It is not an ancient settlement; rather it was founded in the 1960s and 1970s when a group of people who loved nature and the countryside decided to make it their home. Gradually the infrastructure was developed and residents arrived. The community is organised as a cooperative which, it is said, has resulted in a higher standard of services that would otherwise have been expected.

Poggio dei Pini lies within a hollow formed by the mountainous arc of Monte Arrubiu, Monte Santa Barbara and Monte Pauliara. The countryside, already attractive, was enhanced by planting a luxuriant pine wood around a small lake. The sea is some 4 km to the east; the beaches of Nora (20 km) and Chia (35 km) can be reached by the SS. 195. Nearby is the designated park and nature reserve, the mountainous "Parco Del Sulcis" forest area, a popular location for walking, trekking and mountain biking.

Two eighteenth-century edifices stand out in this area: the churches of Santa Barbara and of San Girolamo (Saint Jerome). The former is especially an object of devotion as, according to local legend, it was in this neighbourhood that Saint Barbara was decapitated.

Poggio dei Pini is notable as the former home of the Osservatorio Astronomico di Cagliari. Since the observatory relocated, the site has no become popular with the Sardinian Amateur Astronomers Association.
