= Poggio Sommorto =

Mountain in Italy

- Location within Italy

Highest point
- Elevation: 1,392 m (4,567 ft)
- Coordinates: 42°52′34″N 13°08′26″E

Geography
- Location: Marche, Italy

Poggio Sommorto is a mountain of Marche, Italy.
