= Poggio Rattieri =

Coordinates: 42°38′32″N 13°35′30″E

- Frazione
- Interactive map of Poggio Rattieri
- Country: Italy
- Region: Abruzzo
- Province: Teramo
- Commune: Torricella Sicura
- Time zone: UTC+1 (CET)
  - Summer (DST): UTC+2 (CEST)

Poggio Rattieri is a frazione of Torricella Sicura in the Province of Teramo in the Abruzzo region of Italy. The local church is Parocchia San Nicola, Poggio Rattieri.
