= Poggioli =

Poggioli is an Italian surname. Some notable people with the surname include:

- Armando Poggioli (1888–1967), Italian discus and hammer thrower
- Carlo Poggioli, Canadian costume designer
- Ferdinando Maria Poggioli (1897–1945), Italian screenwriter, film editor and director
- Renato Poggioli (1907–1963), Italian academic
- Sylvia Poggioli (born 1946), American journalist
