= Palneca =

Commune in Corsica, France

- Commune
- Location of Palneca
- Location within France Location within Corsica
- Coordinates: 41°58′14″N 9°10′26″E
- Country: France
- Region: Corsica
- Department: Corse-du-Sud
- Arrondissement: Ajaccio
- Canton: Taravo-Ornano

Government
  - Mayor (2020–2026): Pierre Santoni
- Area^{1}: 43.81 km^{2} (16.92 sq mi)
- Elevation: 900 m (3,000 ft)
- Highest elevation: 2,036 m (6,680 ft)
- Lowest elevation: 692 m (2,270 ft)
- Population (2023): 133
  - Density: 3.04/km^{2} (7.86/sq mi)
- Time zone: UTC+01:00 (CET)
  - Summer (DST): UTC+02:00 (CEST)
- INSEE/Postal code: 2A200 /20134
- ^{1} French Land Register data, which excludes lakes, ponds, glaciers > 1 km^{2} (0.386 sq mi or 247 acres) and river estuaries.

Palneca (French pronunciation: [palneka]; Corsican: Palleca, [palːeka]) is a commune in the Corse-du-Sud department of France on the island of Corsica.

== Population ==
Historical population
Year	Pop.	±% p.a.
1968	378	—
1975	276	−4.39%
1982	204	−4.23%
1990	147	−4.01%
1999	156	+0.66%
2007	154	−0.16%
2012	166	+1.51%
2017	161	−0.61%
2023	133	−3.13%
Source: INSEE

== See also ==
- Communes of the Corse-du-Sud department
