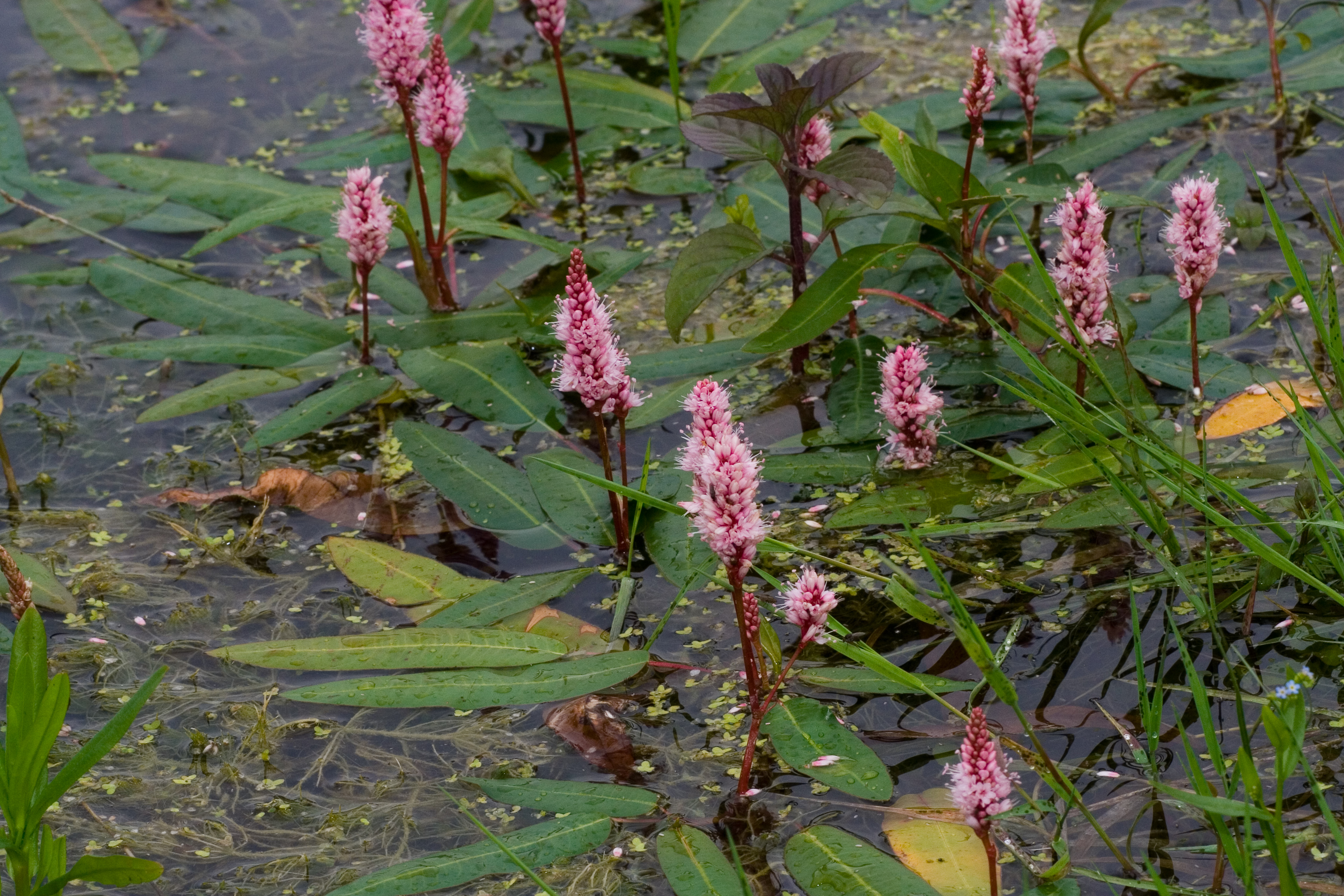
- Persicaria amphibia var. stipulacea

Conservation status
- Secure (NatureServe)

Scientific classification
- Kingdom: Plantae
- Clade: Tracheophytes
- Clade: Angiosperms
- Clade: Eudicots
- Order: Caryophyllales
- Family: Polygonaceae
- Genus: Persicaria
- Species: P. amphibia

Binomial name
- Persicaria amphibia (L.) Delarbre

Synonyms
- List: Chulusium amphibium (L.) Raf.; Persicaria amurensis (Korsh.) Nieuwl.; Persicaria fluitans Montandon; Persicaria fluitans (Eaton) Greene; Persicaria hartwrightii (A.Gray) Greene; Persicaria insignis Greene; Persicaria natans Moldenke; Polygonum amphibium L.; Polygonum amurense (Korsh.) Vorosch.; Polygonum aquaticum A.Gray ex Meisn.; Polygonum cardiophyllum Gand.; Polygonum fluitans Eaton; Polygonum hartwrightii A.Gray; Polygonum insigne (Greene) Fedde; Polygonum inundatum Raf.; Polygonum lanceolatum Gand.; Polygonum longifolium Gand.; Polygonum natans Gueldenst.; Polygonum natans Hegetschw.; Polygonum natans Eaton; Polygonum platyphyllum Gand.; Polygonum purpureum Gilib.; Polygonum rigidulum Gand.; Polygonum salicifolium Schur; Polygonum setiferum Gand.; Polygonum tenuinaevum Gand.; Polygonum terrestre (Leyss.) Hegetschw.

= Persicaria amphibia =

Plant species in the buckwheat family

Persicaria amphibia (syn. Polygonum amphibium) is a species of flowering plant in the knotweed family known by several common names, including longroot smartweed, water knotweed, water smartweed, and amphibious bistort. It is native to much of North America, Asia, Europe, and parts of Africa, and it grows elsewhere as an introduced species and sometimes a noxious weed.

== Distribution and habitat ==
Persicaria amphibia is native to a large area across the northern hemisphere, including Europe, Asia, North America, and parts of Africa. It has been introduced elsewhere, such as South America and other parts of Africa.

It grows in many types of wet habitat, such as ponds, streams, and marshes. It is a rhizomatous perennial herb which takes a variety of forms and is quite variable in morphology. It may be an aquatic plant, growing submerged or floating in water bodies, it may grow in muddy and wet areas which are periodically inundated, and it may grow in moist spots on land, such as in meadows.

Dry-land and fully aquatic plants are sometimes considered different named varieties of the species.

== Description ==
Persicaria amphibia produces a thick stem from its rhizome. The stem may creep, float, or grow erect, rooting at stem nodes that come in contact with moist substrate. Stems are known to reach 3 meters (10 feet) long in aquatic individuals. The stems are ribbed and may be hairless to quite hairy in texture.

Leaves are lance-shaped or take various other shapes and are borne on petioles. They may be over 30 centimeters (1 foot) in length. The inflorescence is a dense terminal cluster of many five-lobed pink flowers.

Plants may have bisexual or unisexual flowers, with some plants bearing only male or only female flowers. The fruit is a shiny brown rounded achene around 3 mm (0.12 in) long.

== Varieties ==
Two varieties are recognized by Plants of the World Online, but some authorities consider Persicaria coccinea to be a variety named emersa.

- P. a. var. stipulacea – Plants aquatic, usually with floating stems and leaves; ocreae with flared apices (when stranded); aerial leaves (when present) nearly sessile with somewhat cordate bases and blunt apices; inflorescence spikes usually 1, greater than 4 cm (1.6 in) long. In North America, P. a. var. stipulacea does not grow south of the Laurentide Ice Sheet except in the mountain west and Mexico.
- P. a. var. amphibia – European
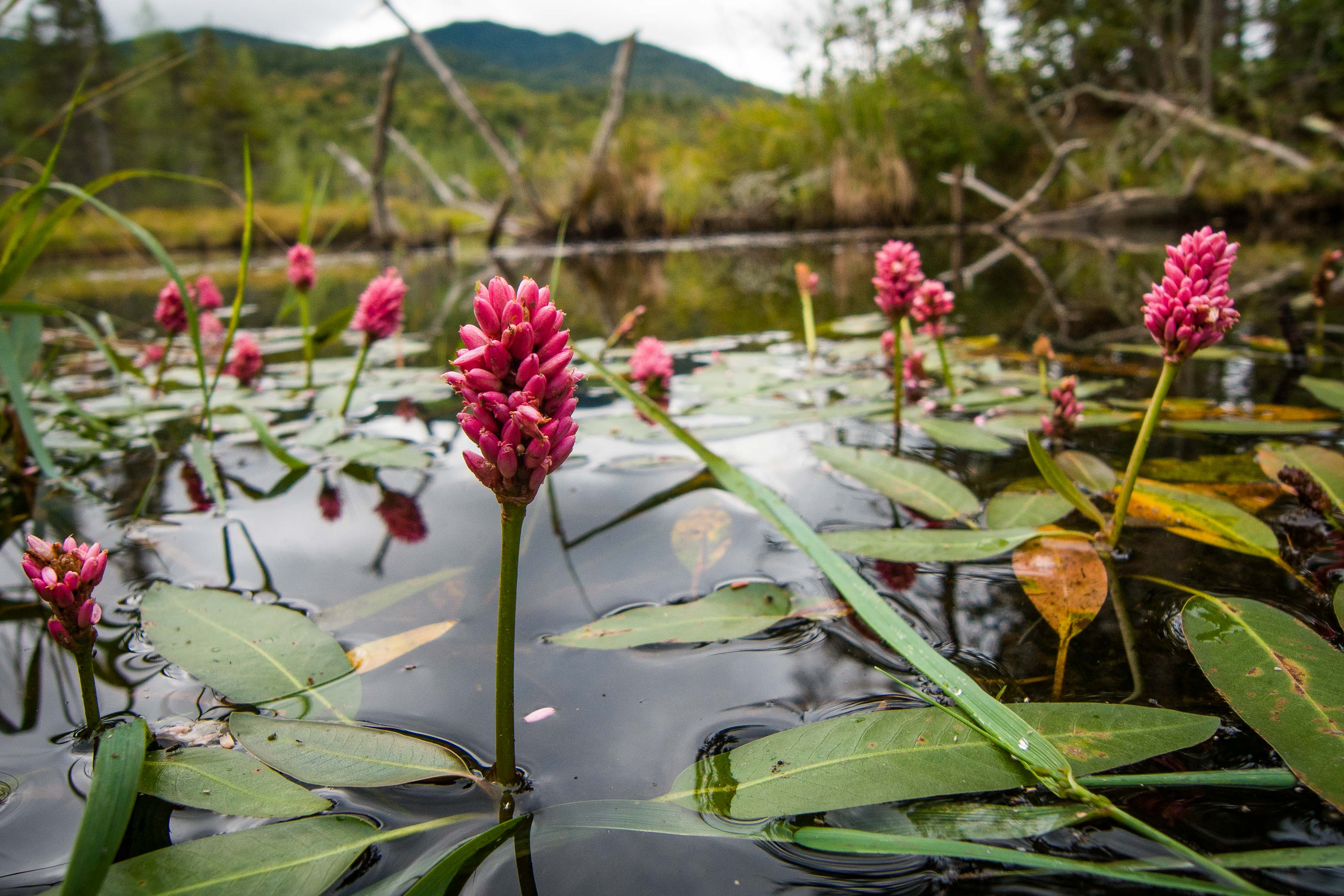
P. a. var. stipulacea aquatic form

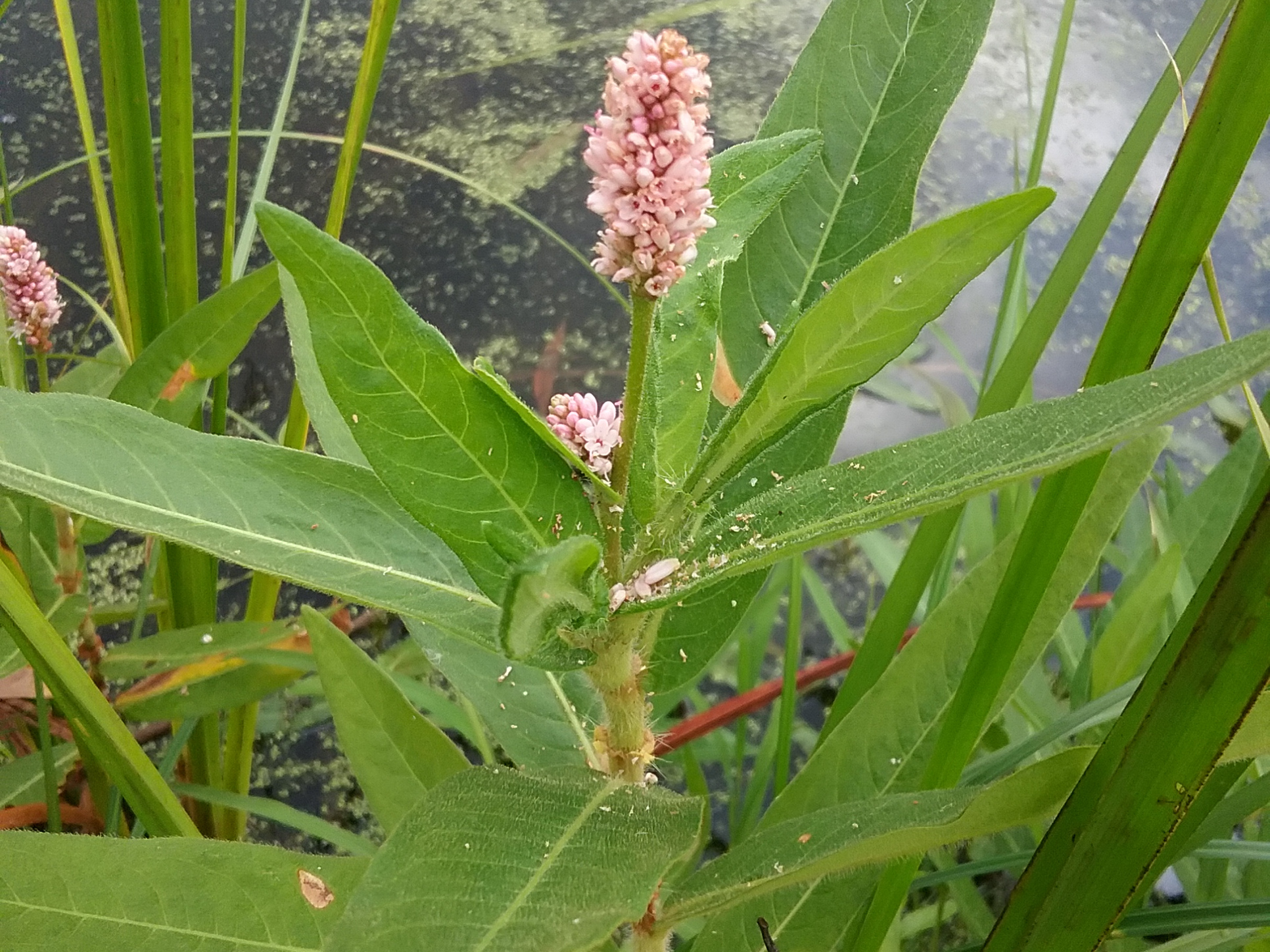
P. a. var. stipulacea terrestrial form

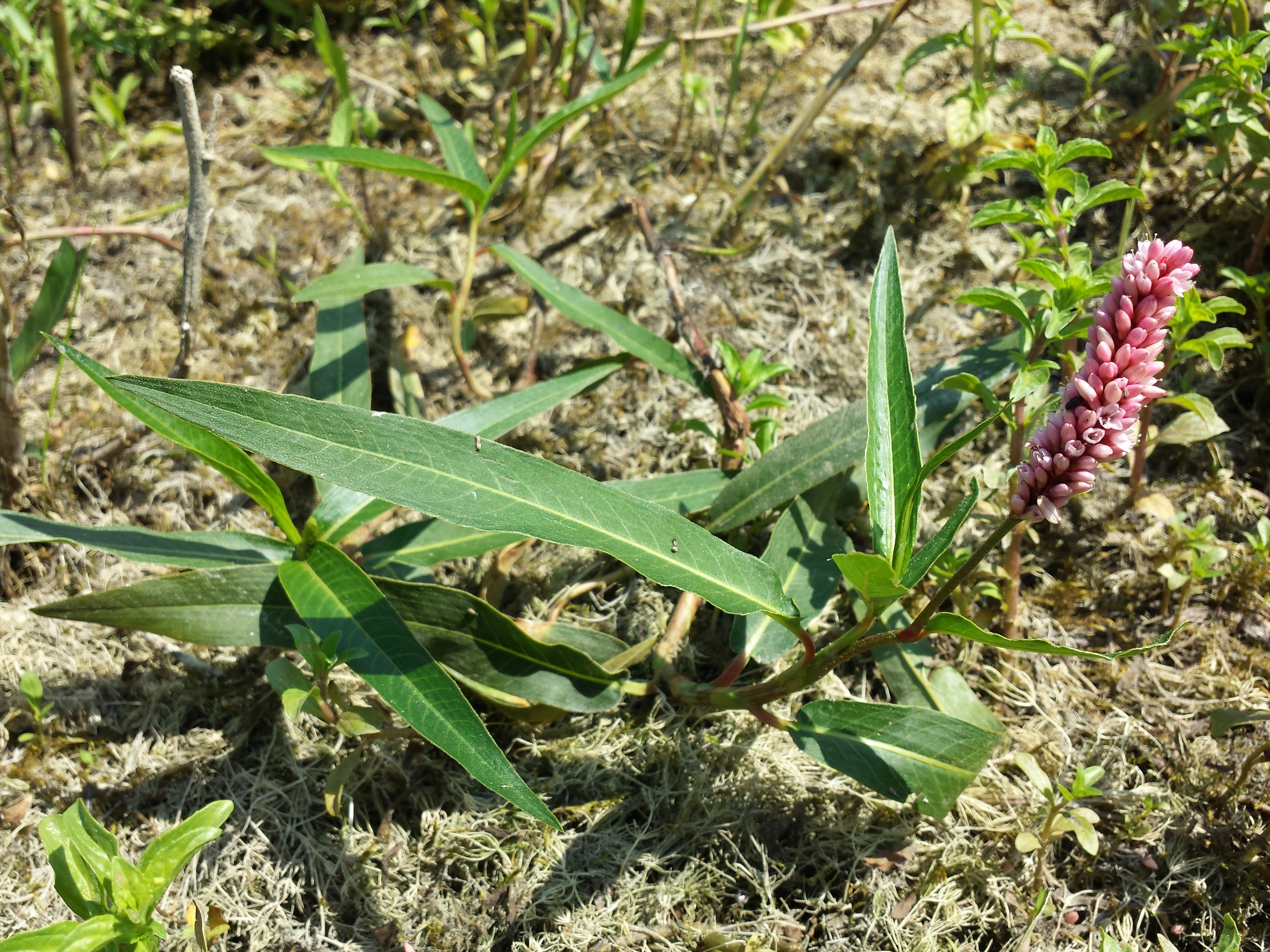
P. a. var. amphibia

== Uses ==
Various parts of this plant were used by several Native American groups as medicinal remedies and sometimes as food.
