= Solaro, Haute-Corse =

Solaro U Sulaghju
- Commune
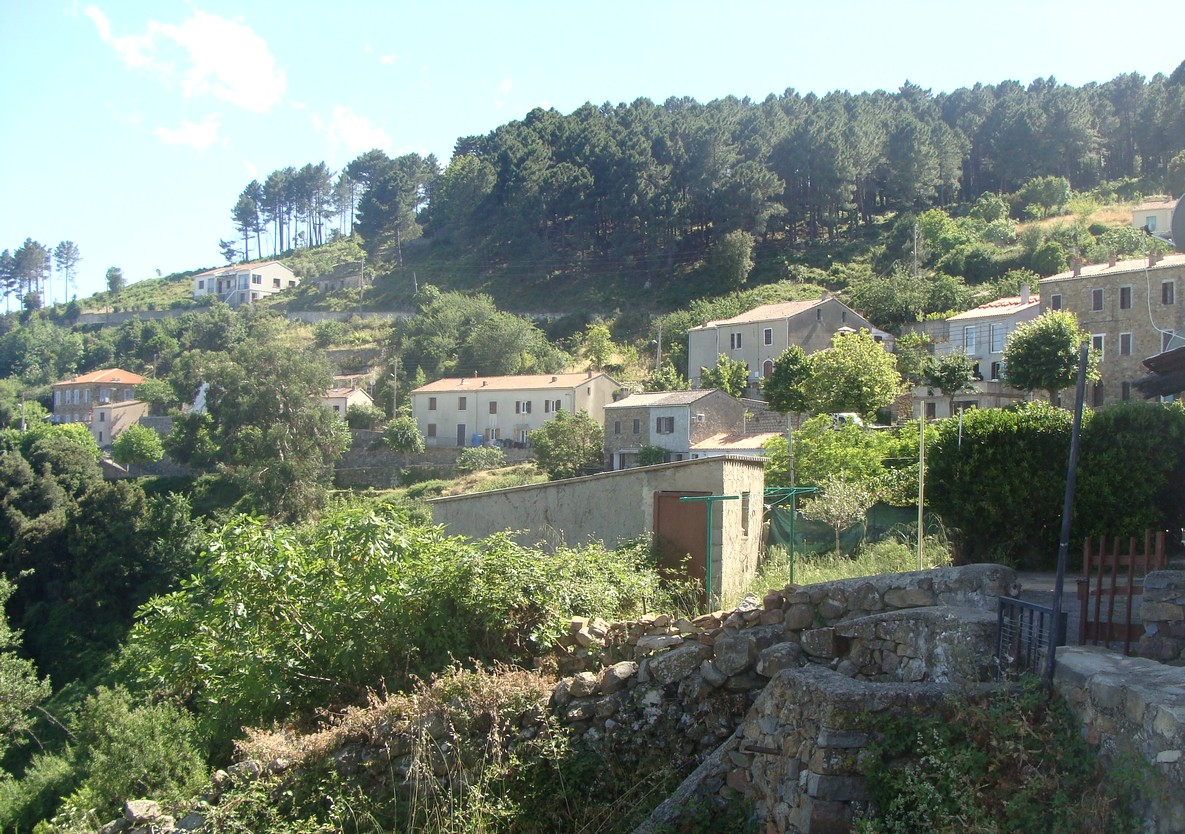
- A view of the village of Solaro
- Location of Solaro
- Location within France Location within Corsica
- Coordinates: 41°54′17″N 9°19′37″E
- Country: France
- Region: Corsica
- Department: Haute-Corse
- Arrondissement: Corte
- Canton: Fiumorbo-Castello

Government
  - Mayor (2020–2026): Guy Moulin-Paoli
- Area^{1}: 93.36 km^{2} (36.05 sq mi)
- Elevation: 497 m (1,631 ft)
- Highest elevation: 2,018 m (6,621 ft)
- Lowest elevation: 0 m (0 ft)
- Population (2023): 736
  - Density: 7.88/km^{2} (20.4/sq mi)
- Time zone: UTC+01:00 (CET)
  - Summer (DST): UTC+02:00 (CEST)
- INSEE/Postal code: 2B283 /20240
- ^{1} French Land Register data, which excludes lakes, ponds, glaciers > 1 km^{2} (0.386 sq mi or 247 acres) and river estuaries.

Solaro (Italian pronunciation: [soˈlaro]; Corsican: U Sulaghju) is a commune in the Haute-Corse department of France on the island of Corsica.

== Population ==
Historical population
Year	Pop.	±% p.a.
1968	291	—
1975	309	+0.86%
1982	477	+6.40%
1990	476	−0.03%
1999	583	+2.28%
2007	646	+1.29%
2012	682	+1.09%
2017	706	+0.69%
2023	736	+0.70%
Source: INSEE

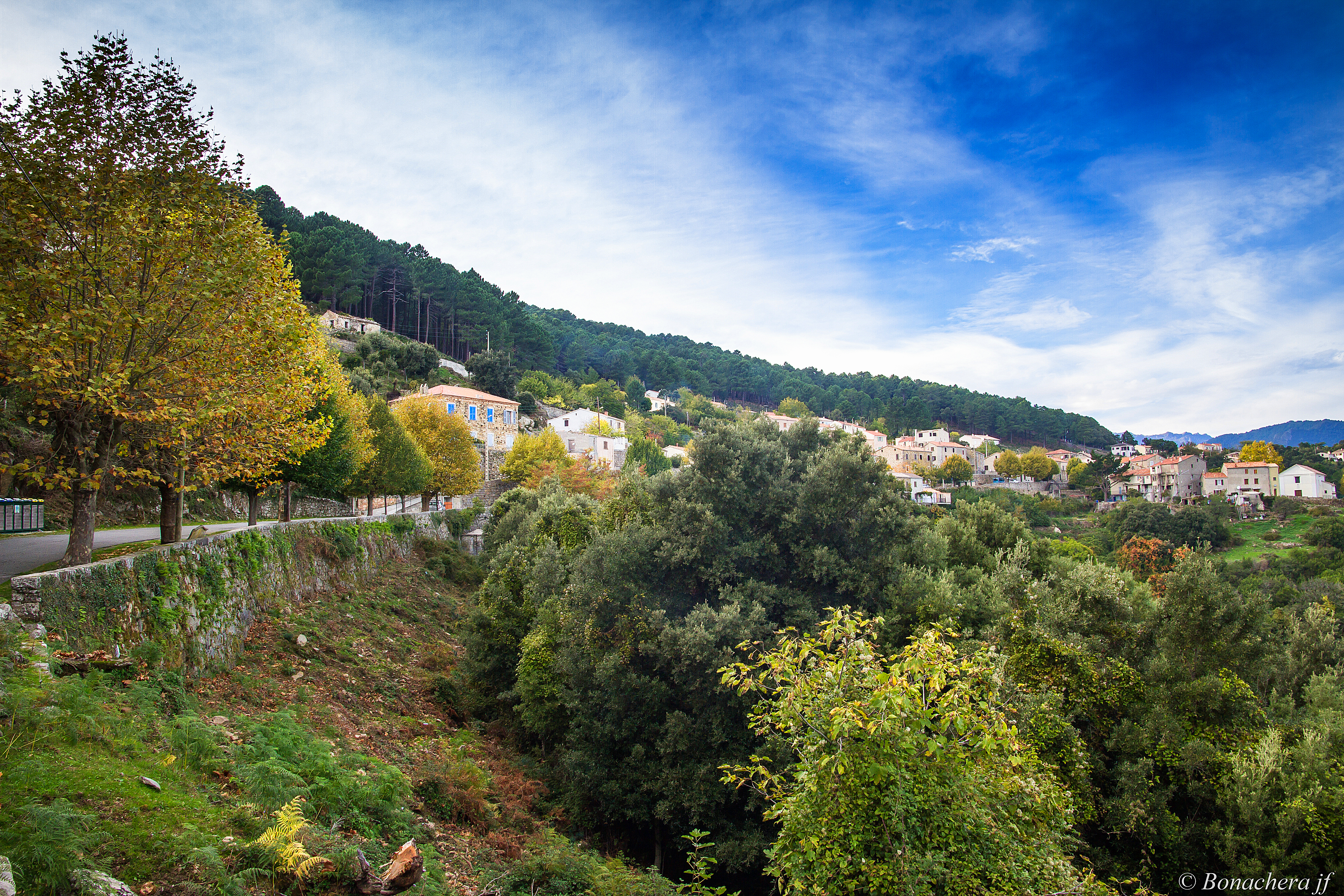
Entrance to the village

== See also ==
- Communes of the Haute-Corse department
- Aiguilles de Bavella
