= Lugo-di-Nazza =

- Commune
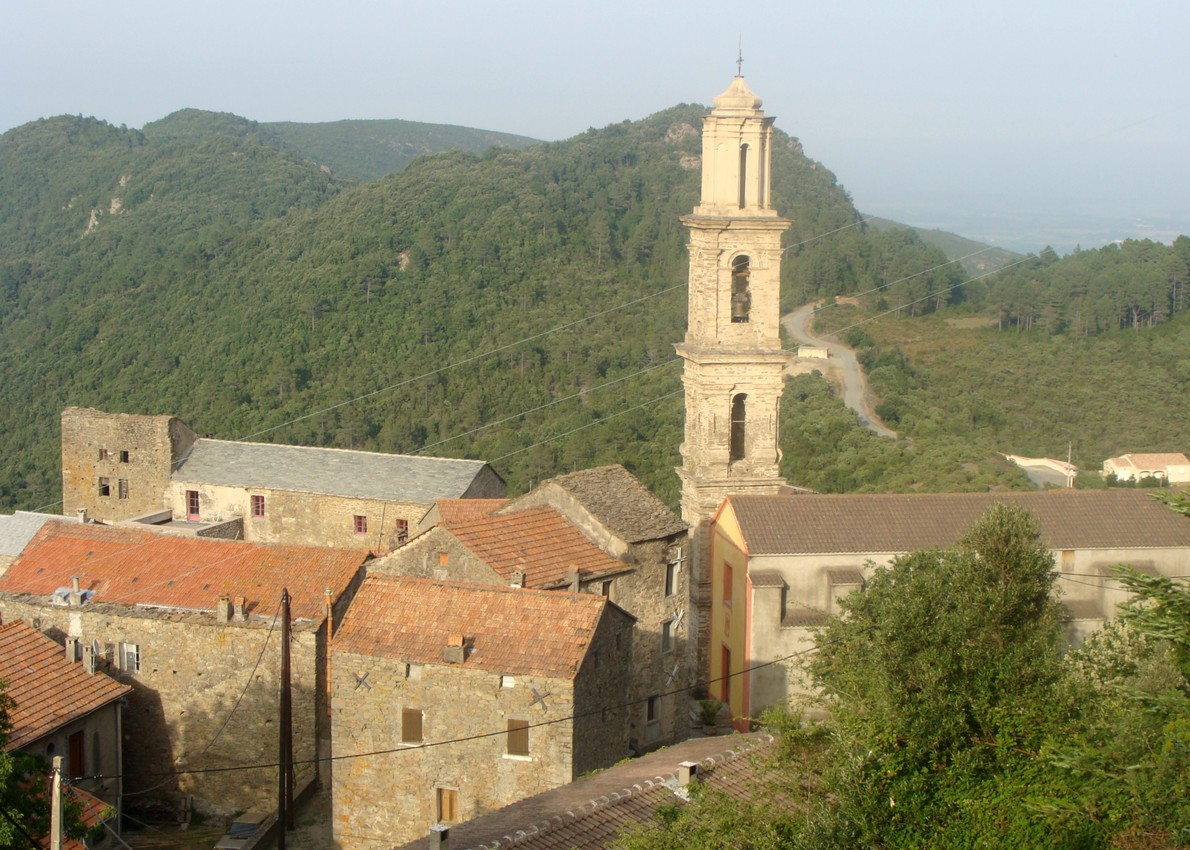
- A view of the old village
- Location of Lugo-di-Nazza
- Location within France Location within Corsica
- Coordinates: 42°04′30″N 9°18′05″E
- Country: France
- Region: Corsica
- Department: Haute-Corse
- Arrondissement: Corte
- Canton: Fiumorbo-Castello

Government
  - Mayor (2020–2026): François Benedetti
- Area^{1}: 25.41 km^{2} (9.81 sq mi)
- Elevation: 420 m (1,380 ft)
- Highest elevation: 1,054 m (3,458 ft)
- Lowest elevation: 38 m (125 ft)
- Population (2023): 85
  - Density: 3.3/km^{2} (8.7/sq mi)
- Time zone: UTC+01:00 (CET)
  - Summer (DST): UTC+02:00 (CEST)
- INSEE/Postal code: 2B149 /20240
- ^{1} French Land Register data, which excludes lakes, ponds, glaciers > 1 km^{2} (0.386 sq mi or 247 acres) and river estuaries.

Lugo-di-Nazza (Corsican: U Lugu di Nazza) is a commune in the Haute-Corse department of France on the island of Corsica.

== Population ==
Historical population
Year	Pop.	±% p.a.
1968	105	—
1975	90	−2.18%
1982	100	+1.52%
1990	105	+0.61%
1999	103	−0.21%
2007	114	+1.28%
2012	115	+0.17%
2017	78	−7.47%
2023	85	+1.44%
Source: INSEE

== See also ==
- Communes of the Haute-Corse department
