= Ghisonaccia =

Ghisonaccia Ghnisunaccia (Corsican)
- Commune
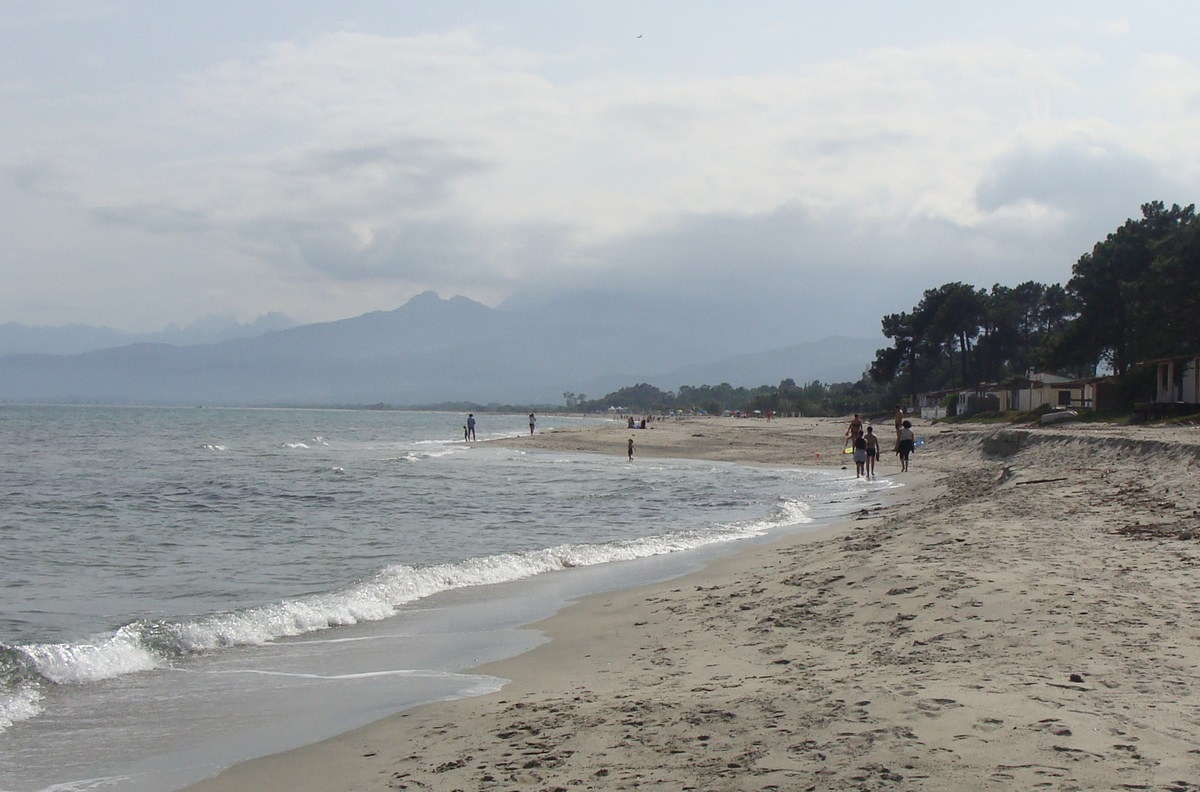
- Vignale Beach
- Location of Ghisonaccia
- Location within France Location within Corsica
- Coordinates: 42°01′03″N 9°24′20″E
- Country: France
- Region: Corsica
- Department: Haute-Corse
- Arrondissement: Corte
- Canton: Ghisonaccia

Government
  - Mayor (2020–2026): Francis Giudici
- Area^{1}: 68.25 km^{2} (26.35 sq mi)
- Elevation: 16 m (52 ft)
- Highest elevation: 329 m (1,079 ft)
- Lowest elevation: 0 m (0 ft)
- Population (2023): 4,405
  - Density: 64.54/km^{2} (167.2/sq mi)
- Time zone: UTC+01:00 (CET)
  - Summer (DST): UTC+02:00 (CEST)
- INSEE/Postal code: 2B123 /20240
- ^{1} French Land Register data, which excludes lakes, ponds, glaciers > 1 km^{2} (0.386 sq mi or 247 acres) and river estuaries.

Ghisonaccia (French pronunciation: [ɡizonatʃ(a)]; Corsican: Ghisunaccia) is a commune of the Haute-Corse department of France on the island of Corsica.

== Population ==
Historical population
Year	Pop.	±% p.a.
1968	2,473	—
1975	3,240	+3.93%
1982	3,297	+0.25%
1990	3,270	−0.10%
1999	3,168	−0.35%
2007	3,360	+0.74%
2012	3,892	+2.98%
2017	4,225	+1.66%
2023	4,405	+0.70%
Source: INSEE

== See also ==
- Communes of the Haute-Corse department
- Former railway station
