= Poggio-di-Nazza =

- Commune
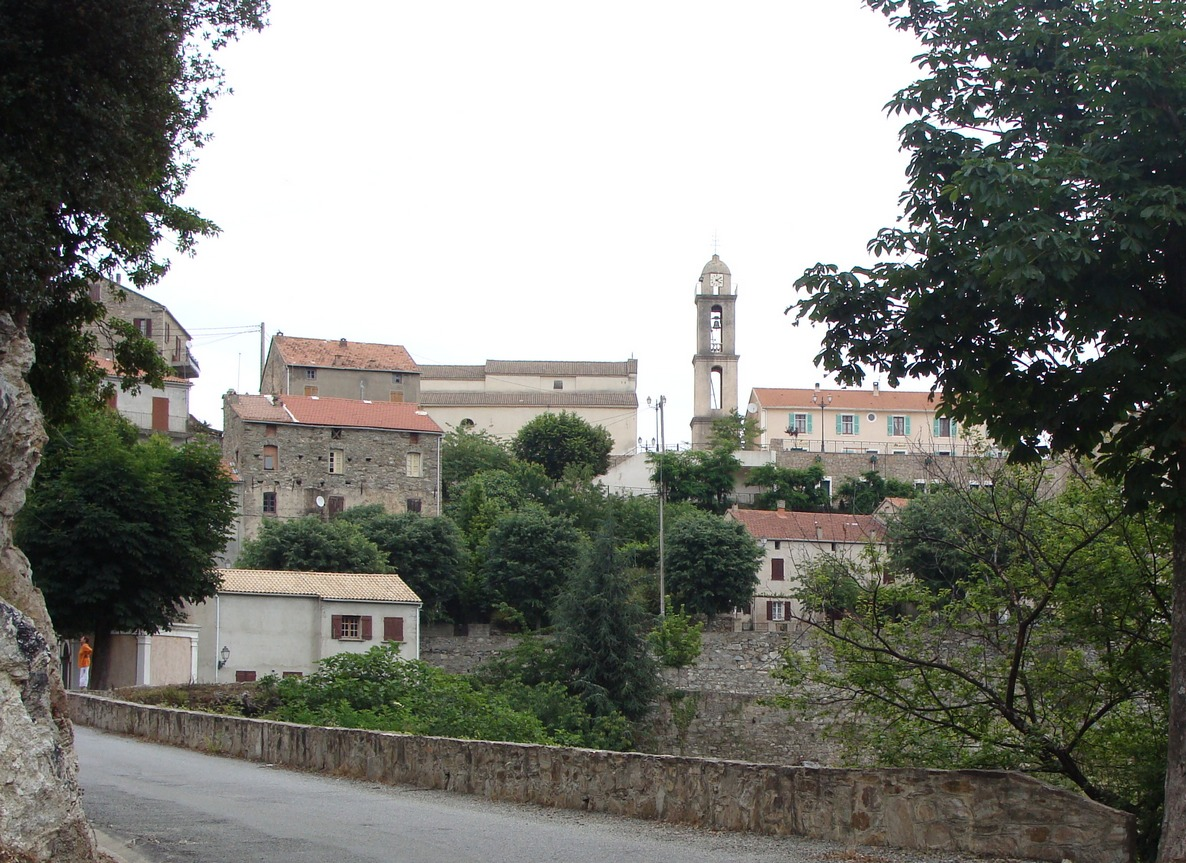
- Poggio-di-Nazza, seen from the road up to the hamlet of Abbazia
- Location of Poggio-di-Nazza
- Location within France Location within Corsica
- Coordinates: 42°03′24″N 9°17′50″E
- Country: France
- Region: Corsica
- Department: Haute-Corse
- Arrondissement: Corte
- Canton: Fiumorbo-Castello

Government
  - Mayor (2020–2026): Jean-Noël Guidici
- Area^{1}: 32.79 km^{2} (12.66 sq mi)
- Elevation: 375 m (1,230 ft)
- Highest elevation: 1,720 m (5,640 ft)
- Lowest elevation: 21 m (69 ft)
- Population (2023): 187
  - Density: 5.70/km^{2} (14.8/sq mi)
- Time zone: UTC+01:00 (CET)
  - Summer (DST): UTC+02:00 (CEST)
- INSEE/Postal code: 2B236 /20240
- ^{1} French Land Register data, which excludes lakes, ponds, glaciers > 1 km^{2} (0.386 sq mi or 247 acres) and river estuaries.

Poggio-di-Nazza is a commune in the Haute-Corse department of France on the island of Corsica.

== Population ==
Historical population
| Year | Pop. | ±% p.a. |
|---|---|---|
| 1968 | 305 | — |
| 1975 | 288 | −0.82% |
| 1982 | 224 | −3.53% |
| 1990 | 165 | −3.75% |
| 1999 | 185 | +1.28% |
| 2007 | 180 | −0.34% |
| 2012 | 173 | −0.79% |
| 2017 | 176 | +0.34% |
| 2023 | 187 | +1.02% |
Source: INSEE

== See also ==
- Communes of the Haute-Corse department
