= List of Genoese towers in Corsica =

This is a list of Genoese towers in Corsica, a series of coastal defense towers constructed by the Republic of Genoa between 1530 and 1620 to defend against attacks by Barbary pirates.

Map showing location of the towers

Name	Commune	Constructed	Historical Monument	Integrity	Notes
Tour d'Agnello	Rogliano	end of 16th century	No	Whole	
Tour d'Albo	Ogliastro	1562	Yes	Whole	
Tour d'Alistro	Canale-di-Verde		No	Ruined	
Tour d'Ancone	Calcatoggio	1581	No	Ruined	Private property, included in the French "General Inventory of Cultural Heritage"
Tour d'Aspretto	Ajaccio	1582	No	No longer extant	Built for Agostino Bonaparte
Tour de Bravone	Linguizzetta		No	Traces	
Tour de la Calanca	Olmeto		No	Whole	
Tour de Caldanu	Lumio		No	Partial	
Tour de Caldarello	Pianottoli-Caldarello	end of 16th century	Yes	Whole	Property of the commune
Tour de Campomoro	Belvédère-Campomoro	1585	Yes	Whole	Property of Conservatoire du littoral
Tour de Canton Grosso			No	No longer extant	
Tour de Capannella	Serra-di-Ferro		No	Whole	Public property, included in the French "General Inventory of Cultural Heritage"
Tour de Capigliolo	Casaglione	1582	No	Partial	Private property, included in the French "General Inventory of Cultural Heritage"
Tour de Capitello	Grosseto-Prugna	1552	Yes	Whole	Property of the commune
Tour de Capo di Feno	Ajaccio		No	Partial	
Tour de Capriona	Serra-di-Ferro		No	Partial	
Tour de Capu di Muru	Coti-Chiavari	1600	Yes	Whole	Owned and maintained by the Collectivité Territoriale de Corse in agreement with the Conservatoire du littoral
Tour de Capu Neru	Coti-Chiavari	1597	Yes	Whole	
Torra di Cargali			No	Whole	
Tour de Cargèse	Cargèse	1605	No	Base only	Property of Conservatoire du littoral
Tour de la Castagna	Coti-Chiavari	1600	No	Whole	
Tour de Castellare	Pietracorbara		No	Partial	
Tour de Castelluccio	Ajaccio	before 1597	No	Whole	
Tour de Centuri	Centuri		No	Base only	
Tour de Diana	Aléria	1582	No	Ruined	
Tour d'Elbo	Osani		No	Ruined	
Tour d'Erbalunga	Brando	c. 1600	Yes	Ruined	Rebuilt over a tower destroyed in 1553
Tour de Farinole	Farinole	1562	Yes	Whole	
Tour de Fautea	Zonza	before 1601	Yes	Whole	Owned and maintained by the Collectivité Territoriale de Corse in agreement with the Conservatoire du littoral
Tour de Finocchiarola	Rogliano		No	Whole	
Tour de Fiorentina	San-Giuliano	1575	No	Base only	Public property, included in the French "General Inventory of Cultural Heritage"
Torra di Fornali	Saint-Florent, Haute-Corse		No	Whole	
Tour de Furiani	Furiani	16th century	Yes	Whole	Square tower within village away from coast
Tour de Galéria	Galéria	1551-1573	Yes	Ruined	
Tour de Gargali	Osani		No	Ruined	
Tour de Giottani	Barrettali		No	Ruined	
Tour de Giraglia	Ersa	1584	Yes	Whole	Unusual square shape. Property of the French state
Tour de Girolata	Osani	1552	Yes	Whole	
Tour de Grisgione	San-Martino-di-Lota	c. 1532	No	No longer extant	
Tour d'Isolella	Pietrosella	1608	Yes	Whole	Property of the commune
Tour de L'Île-Rousse	L'Île-Rousse		No	Ruined	
Tour de Lozari	Belgodère		No	Base only	Only the base survives
Tour de Meria	Meria		No	Whole	
Tour de Micalona	Olmeto		No	Whole	
Tour de Miomo	Santa-Maria-di-Lota	1561	Yes	Whole	
Tour de Mortella	Saint-Florent	1563	Yes	Partial	Property of Conservatoire du littoral
Tour de Negru	Olmeta-di-Capocorso	1560	Yes	Whole	
Tour de Nonza	Nonza	before 1617	Yes	Whole	
Tour d'Olmeto	Monacia-d'Aullène		No	Ruined	
Tour d'Omigna	Cargèse	1505	Yes	Whole	Property of Conservatoire du littoral
Tour d'Orchinu	Cargèse	1605	No	Ruined	Property of Conservatoire du littoral
Tour de l'Osse	Cagnano	1599	Yes	Whole	
Tour de Padulella	San-Nicolao	1565	No	No longer extant	Included in the French "General Inventory of Cultural Heritage"
Tour de la Parata	Ajaccio	1550	No	Whole	
Tour de Pelusella	Appietto		No	Partial	
Tour de Pianosa	Occhiatana	around 1578	No	Base only	Unusual square-shaped base. Included in the French "General Inventory of Cultural Heritage"
Tour de Pietranera	San-Martino-di-Lota		No	No longer extant	
Tour de Pinarellu	Zonza	c. 1595	Yes	Whole	Property of Conservatoire du littoral
Tour de Poggio	Ersa	1550-1600	No	Whole	Private property within hamlet not on coast. Included in the French "General Inventory of Cultural Heritage"
Tour de Porto	Ota	1551	Yes	Whole	Unusual square shape
Tour de Prunete	Cervione		No	Whole	Privately owned and converted into a house. Included in the French "General Inventory of Cultural Heritage"
Tour de Punta d'Arcu	Borgo		No	Partial	
Tour de Roccapina	Sartène	1609	Yes	Ruined	
Tour de Rogliano	Rogliano	15th century	Yes	Whole	In village away from coast. Privately owned.
Tour de Sacro	Brando		No	Ruined	Only part of the base survives
Tour de Sagone	Vico	1581	Yes	Ruined	Privately owned
Tour de Saleccia	Monticello		No	Ruined	Only part of the base survives
Tour de San Benedettu	Lecci		No	Traces	
Tour de San Ciprianu	Lecci	1589	Yes	Partial	Unusual square shape. Privately owned
Tour de San Pellegrino	Penta-di-Casinca		No	No longer extant	Included in the French "General Inventory of Cultural Heritage"
Tour de Sant'Amanza	Bonifacio		No	Base only	
Tour de Santa Maria della Chiappella	Rogliano	1548	Yes	Partial	Owned and maintained by the Collectivité Territoriale de Corse in agreement with the Conservatoire du littoral.
Tour de Scalo	Pino		No	Ruined	
Tour du Sel	Calvi	1483	Yes	Whole	Part of the ramparts of a citadel
Tour de Sénèque	Luri		Yes	Ruined	Property of the commune
Tour de Senetosa	Sartène	1610	Yes	Whole	Property of Conservatoire du littoral
Tour de Solenzara	Sari-Solenzara		No	No longer extant	
Tour de Spano	Lumio		No	Base only	
Tour de Sponsaglia	Bonifacio		No	Base only	
Tour de Tizzano	Sartène		Yes	Ruined	Privately owned
Tour de Toga	Ville-di-Pietrabugno		No	No longer extant	Ruins demolished in the 20th century.
Tour de Tollare	Ersa		No	Whole	
Tour de Turghiu	Piana	1608	No	Ruined	
Torra di Vallitone			No		
Tour de Vignale	Ghisonaccia		No	No longer extant	

== Sources ==
- Graziani, Antoine-Marie (2000). "Les ouvrages de défense en Corse contre les Turcs (1530-1650)". In Vergé-Franceschi, Michel; Graziani, Antoine-Marie (eds.). La guerre de course en Méditerranée (1515-1830) (in French). Paris: Presses de l'Université Paris IV-Sorbonne. ISBN 2-84050-167-8.
- Chabot, Laurent (2010). Tours & Citadelles de Corse (in French). Edisud. ISBN 978-2-7449-0864-4.
