= Torra di Pianosa =

Genoese coastal defence tower in Corsica

Tower of Pianosa
- Torra di Pianosa (Corsican)
- Location within Corsica
- 42°38′24″N 8°59′15″E

History
- Built: Second half of 16th century

The Tower of Pianosa or Tower of Cala Rossa (Corsican: Torra di Pianosa) is a ruined Genoese tower located in the commune of Occhiatana on the west coast of the Corsica. Only the base survives. It sits at a height of 33 metres (108 ft) overlooking the sea.

The tower was built in around 1578. It was one of a series of coastal defences constructed by the Republic of Genoa between 1530 and 1620 to stem the attacks by Barbary pirates.

In 2012 the tower was added to the "General Inventory of Cultural Heritage" (Inventaire général du patrimoine culturel) maintained by the French Ministry of Culture. The Conservatoire du littoral, the French government agency responsible for the protection of outstanding natural areas on the coast, has announced that it intends to purchase the headland and adjacent coastline. As of 2017 it had acquired 66 hectares (160 acres).

== See also ==
- List of Genoese towers in Corsica
