= Torra di Prunete =

Genoese coastal defence tower in Corsica

Tower of Prunete
- Torra di Prunete (Corsican)
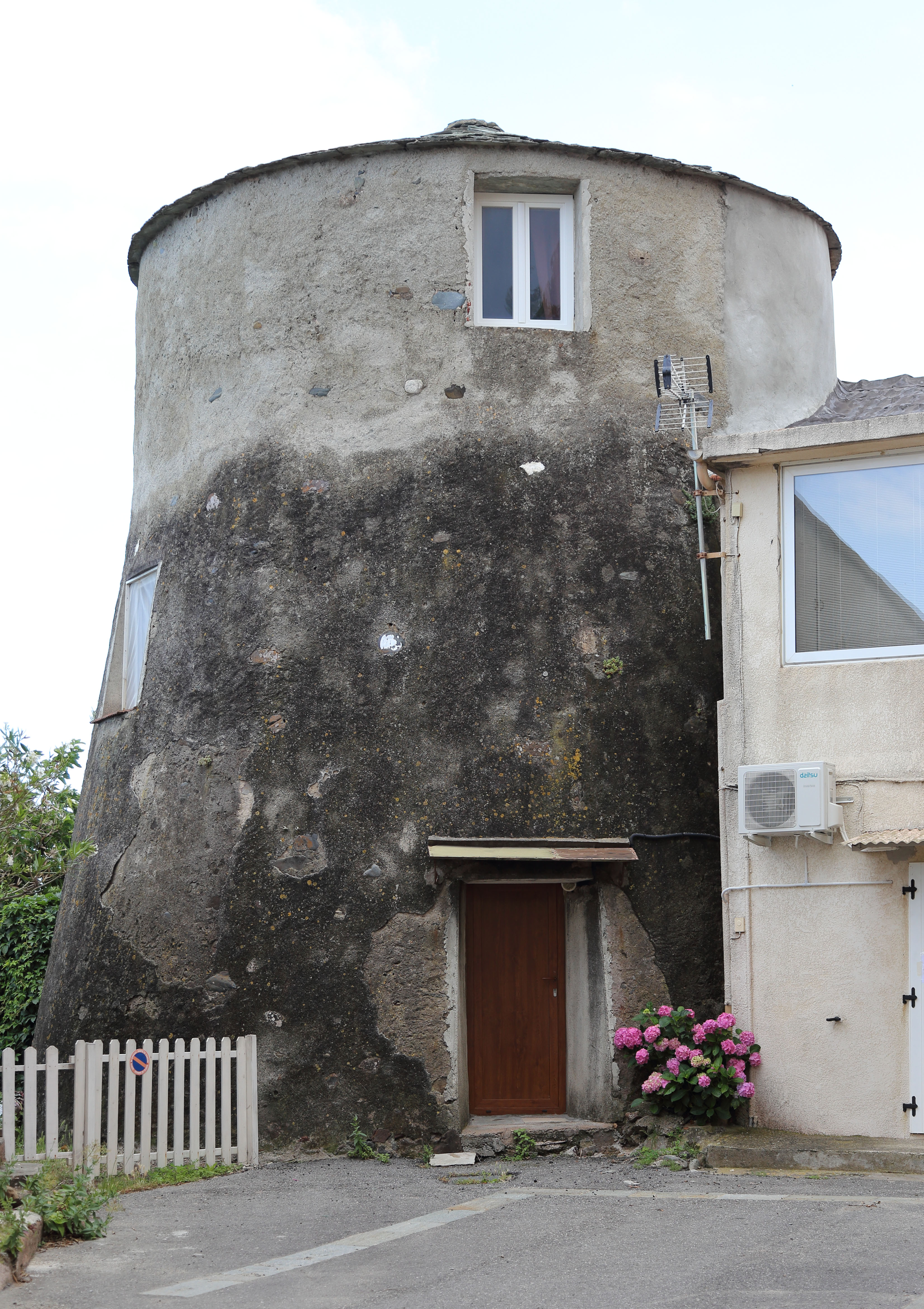

- Location within Corsica
- 42°19′16.9″N 9°32′44.6″E

History
- Built: Second half of 16th century

The Tower of Prunete or Tower of Scalo Vecchio (Corsican: Torra di Prunete) is a Genoese tower located in the commune of Cervione on the east coast of the Corsica. The tower has been converted into a house.

The tower was completed in around 1580 and then restored in 1710. It was one of a series of coastal defences constructed by the Republic of Genoa between 1530 and 1620 to stem the attacks by Barbary pirates.

In 2003 the tower was added to the "General Inventory of Cultural Heritage" (Inventaire général du patrimoine culturel) maintained by the French Ministry of Culture. The tower is privately owned.

== See also ==
- List of Genoese towers in Corsica
