= Torra di Lozari =

Genoese coastal defence tower in Corsica

Tower of Lozari
- Torra di Lozari (Corsican)
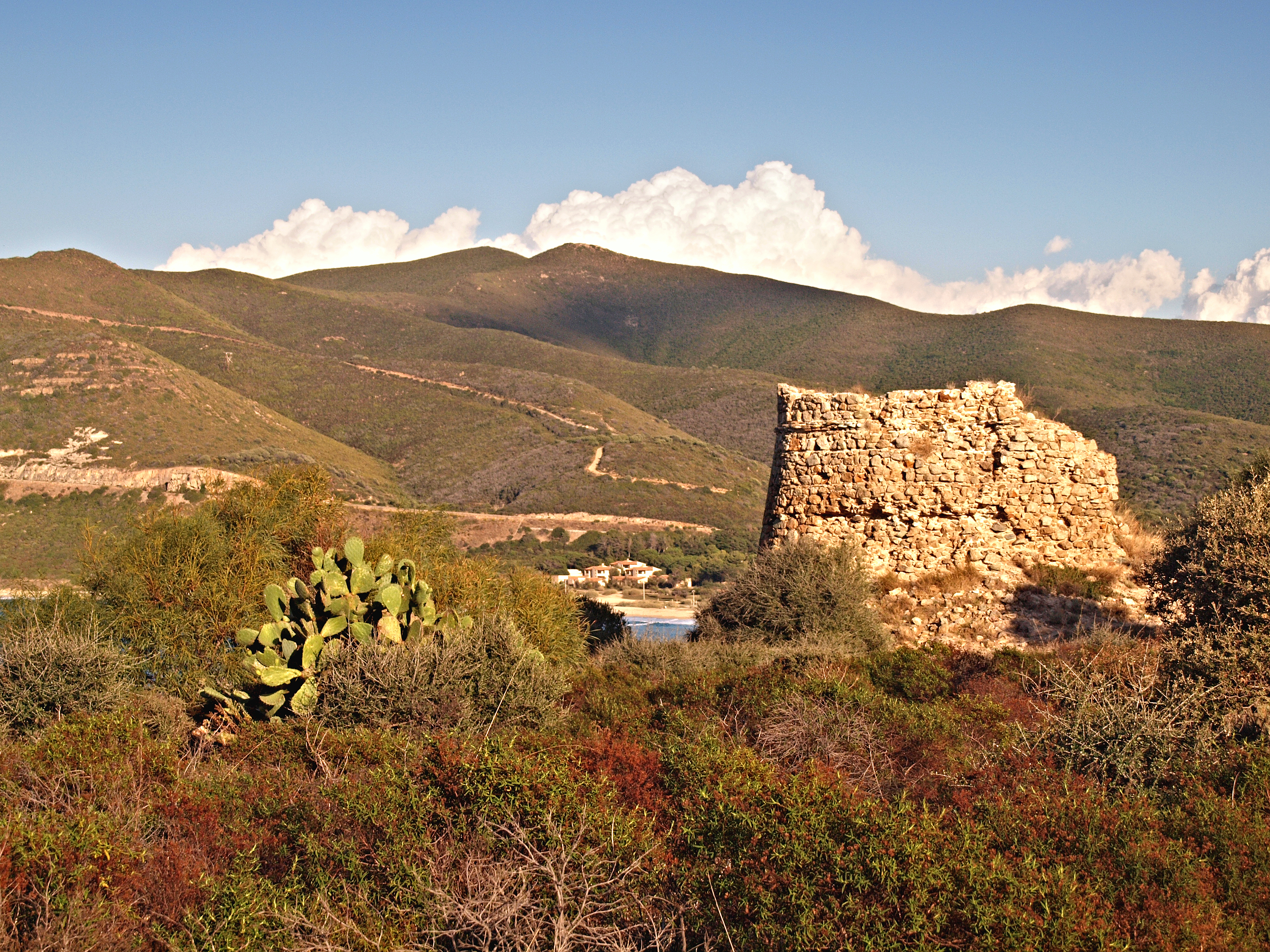

- Location within Corsica
- 42°38′29″N 9°0′20″E

History
- Built: Second half 16th century

The Tower of Lozari (Corsican: Torra di Lozari) is a ruined Genoese tower located in the commune of Belgodère on the west coast of the French island of Corsica. Only the base of the tower has survived. It sits on the headland at a height of 32 metres (105 ft) overlooking the sea.

The tower was one of a series of coastal defences constructed by the Republic of Genoa between 1530 and 1620 to stem the attacks by Barbary pirates.

The Conservatoire du littoral, a French government agency responsible for the protection of outstanding natural areas on the coast, has announced that it intends to purchase the headland and adjacent coastline. As of 2017 it had acquired 66 hectares (160 acres).

== See also ==
- List of Genoese towers in Corsica
