= Tour de Capigliolo =

Genoese coastal defence tower in Corsica

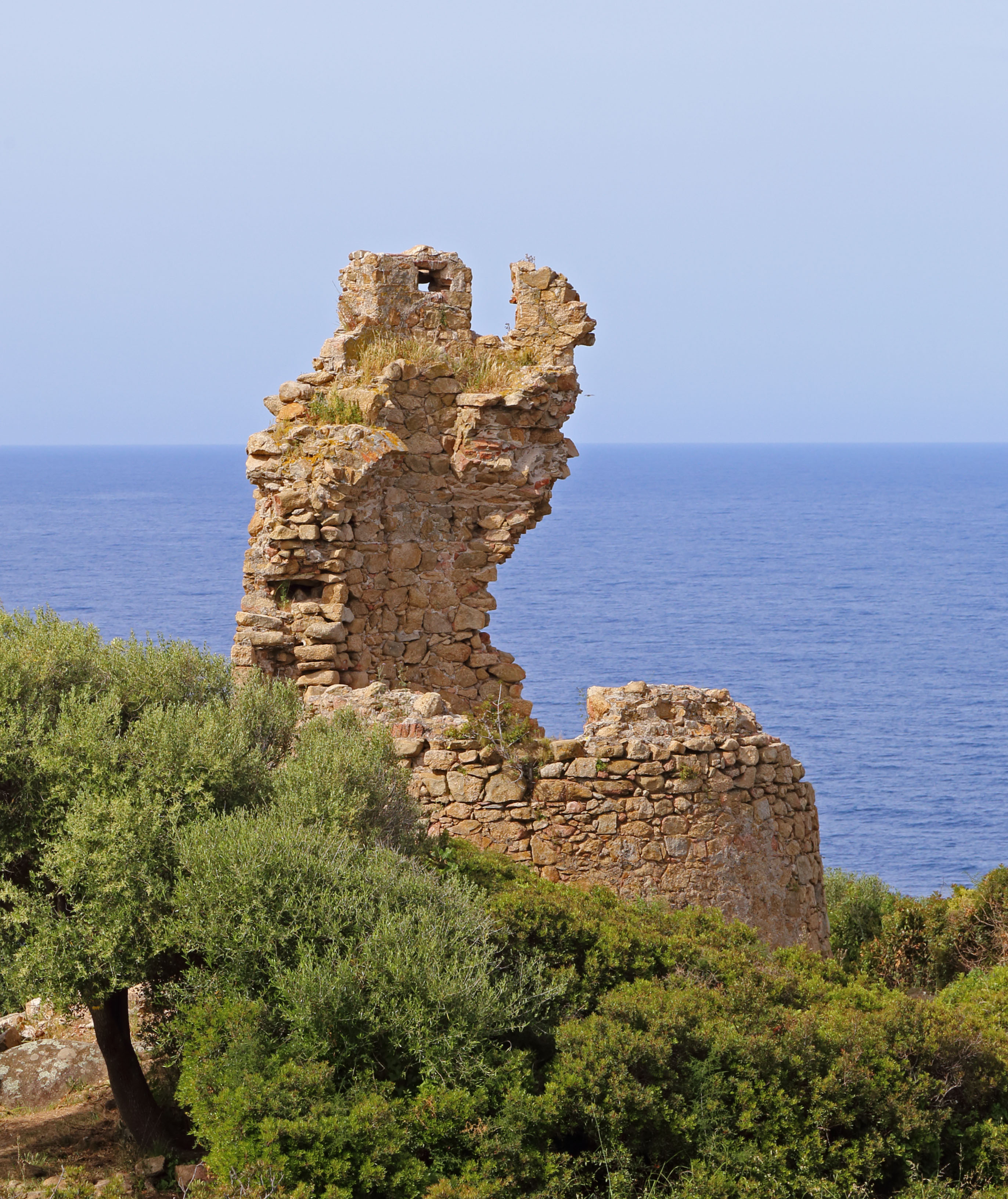

- Location within Corsica
- 42°3′55.6″N 8°43′22.3″E

History
- Built: 1582

The Tour de Capigliolo (Corsican: Torra di Capigliolu) is a ruined Genoese tower located in the commune of Casaglione (Corse-du-Sud) on the west coast of the French island of Corsica. The tower sits at a height of 91 metres (299 ft) on the Punta Capigliolo headland to the north of the Golfu di a Liscia.

The construction of the tower was begun in 1582. It was one of a series of coastal defences constructed by the Republic of Genoa between 1530 and 1620 to stem the attacks by Barbary pirates. In 2007 the tower was added to the General Inventory of Cultural Heritage (Inventaire général du patrimoine culturel) maintained by the French Ministry of Culture. The tower is privately owned.

== See also ==
- List of Genoese towers in Corsica
