= Torra di Spanu =

Genoese coastal defence tower in Corsica

Tower of Spanu
- Torra di Spanu (Corsican)
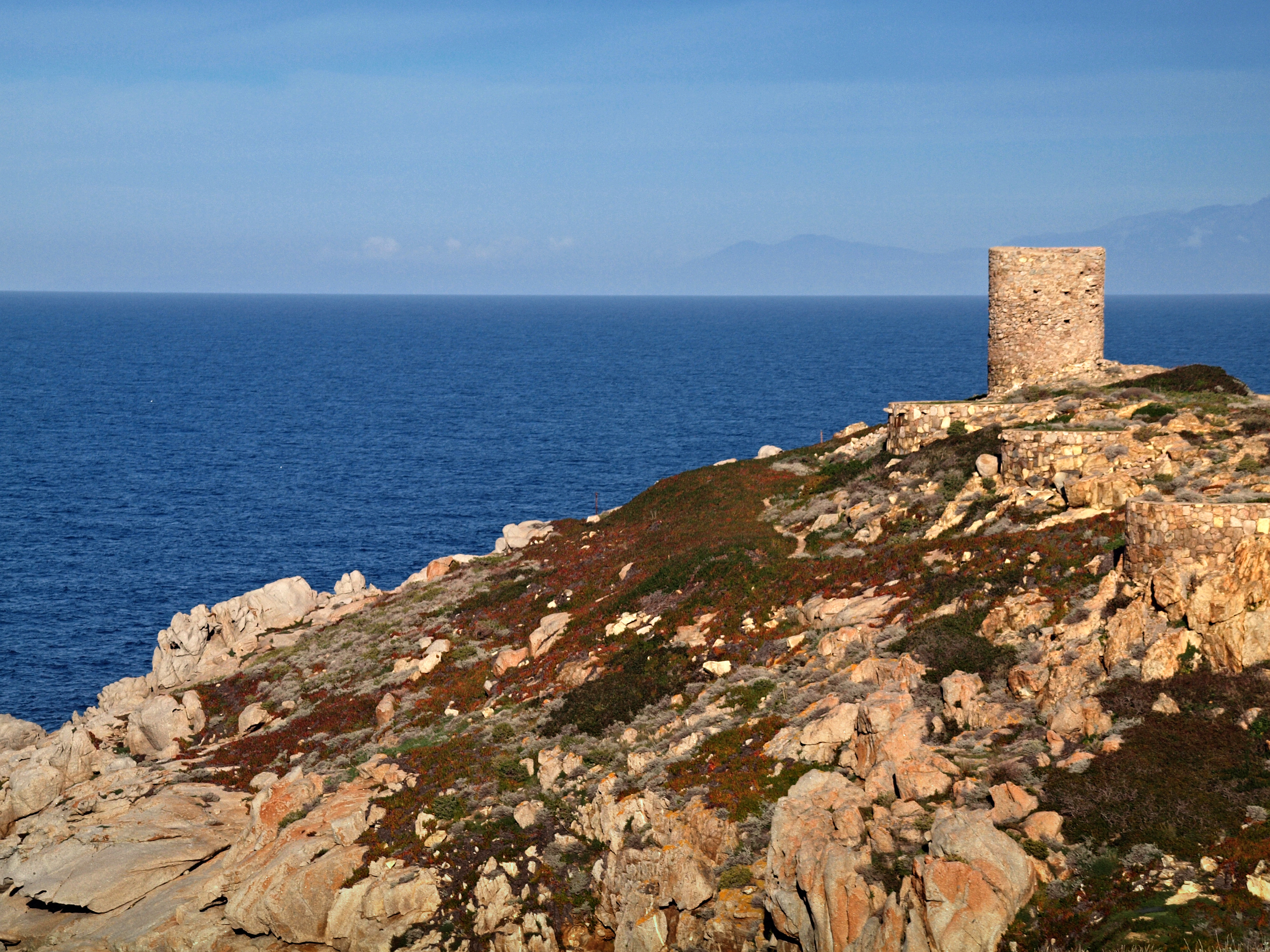

- Location within Corsica
- 42°36′11″N 8°48′23″E

History
- Built: Second half of 16th century

The Tower of Spanu (Corsican: Torra di Spanu) is a ruined Genoese tower located in the commune of Lumio on the west coast of the Corsica. It sits on the Punta Spano headland at a height of 25 metres (82 ft) above the sea. Only the lower portion of the tower survives.

The tower was one of a series of coastal defences constructed by the Republic of Genoa between 1530 and 1620 to stem the attacks by Barbary pirates.

The Conservatoire du littoral, a French government agency responsible for the protection of outstanding natural areas on the coast, has announced that it intends to purchase the Punta Spano headland. As of 2017 it had acquired 66 hectares (160 acres).

== See also ==
- List of Genoese towers in Corsica
