= Torra di Roccapina =

Genoese coastal defence tower in Corsica

Tower of Roccapina
- Torra di Roccapina (Corsican)
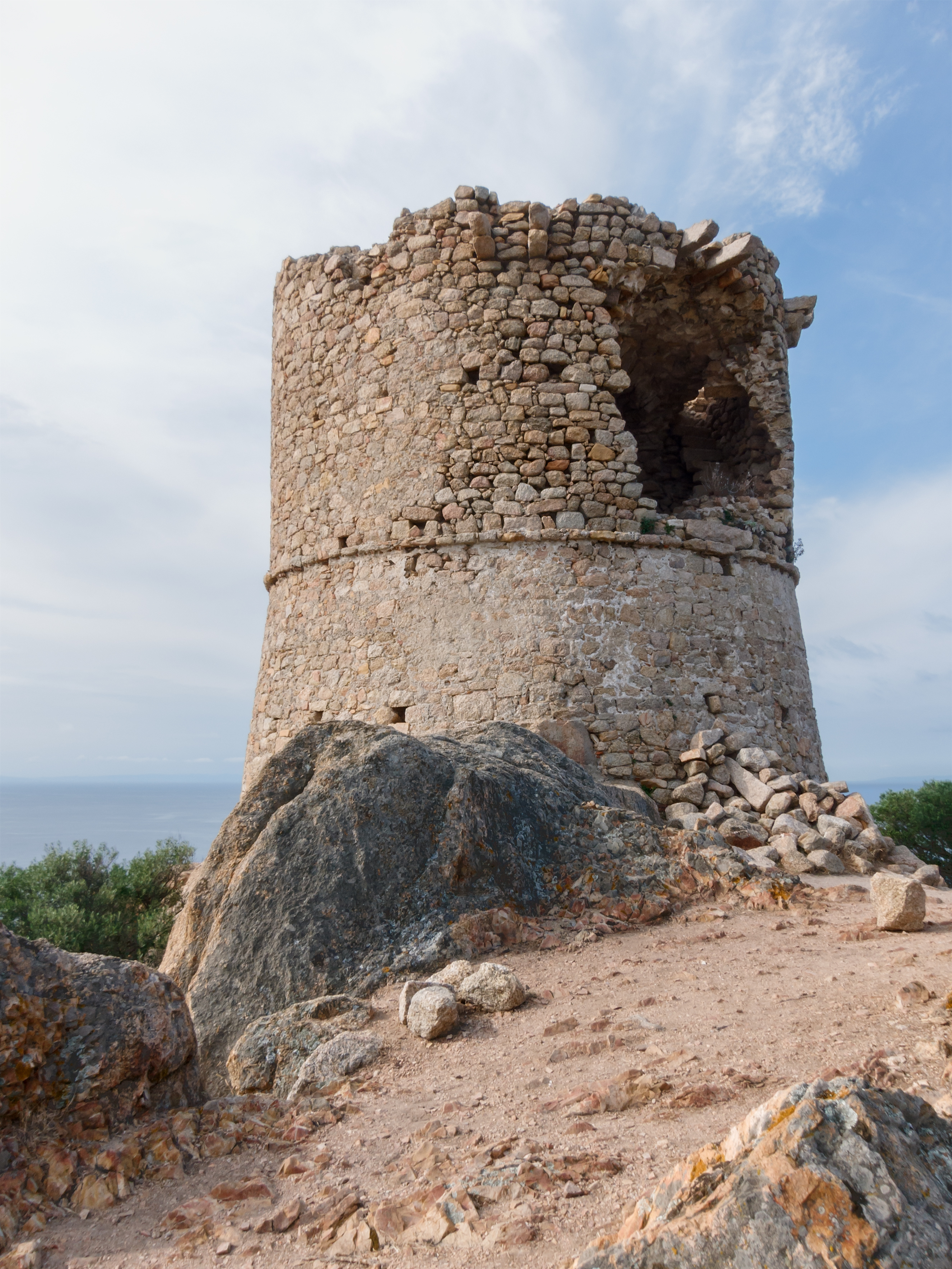

- Location within Corsica
- 41°29′44″N 8°55′44″E

History
- Built: 1609

Monument historique
- Designated: 29 July 1994
- Reference no.: PA00132604

The Tower of Roccapina (Corsican: Torra di Roccapina) is a ruined Genoese tower located in the commune of Sartène (Corse-du-Sud) on the southwest coast of Corsica. The tower sits at an elevation of 100 metres (330 ft) on the Cappu di Roccapina headland.

Construction of the tower began in 1609. It was one of a series of coastal defences built by the Republic of Genoa between 1530 and 1620 to stem attacks by Barbary pirates. In 1994 the tower was listed as one of the official historical monuments of France.

The Conservatoire du littoral, a French government agency responsible for the protection of outstanding natural areas on the coast, has purchased 503 hectares (1,240 acres) of the Punta di u Capicciolu headland and the adjacent coastline.

== See also ==
- List of Genoese towers in Corsica
