= Torra di Capu di Fenu =

Genoese coastal defence tower in Corsica

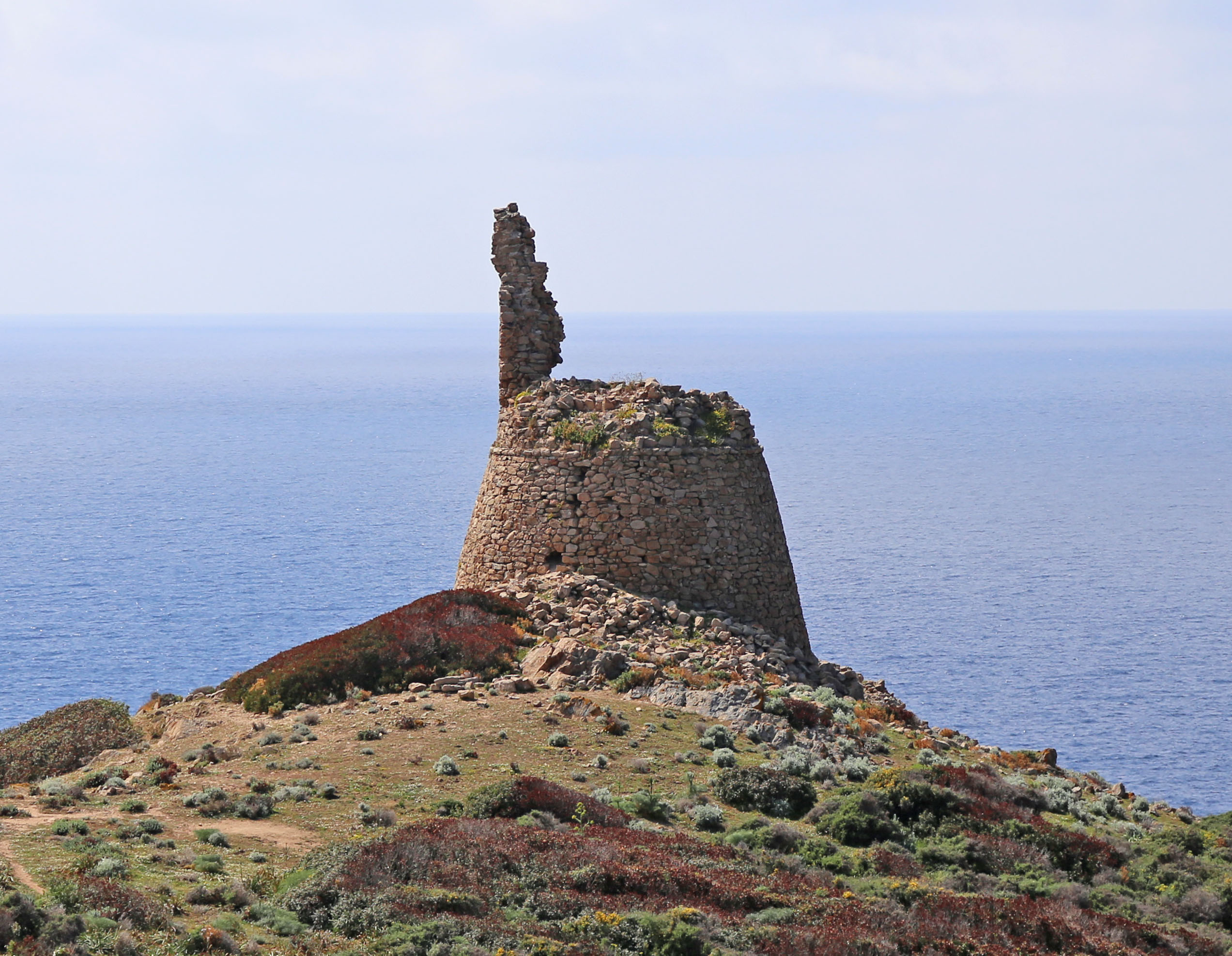

- Location within Corsica
- 41°57′44″N 8°35′36″E

History
- Built: Second half 16th century

The Corsican: Torra di Capu di Fenu is a ruined Genoese tower located in the commune of Ajaccio on the west coast of Corsica. The ruined tower sits at a height of 68 metres (223 ft) above the sea on the Capo di Feno headland. Only part of the tower survives.

The tower was built in the second half of the 16th century. It was one of a series of coastal defences constructed by the Republic of Genoa between 1530 and 1620 to stem the attacks by Barbary pirates.

The Conservatoire du littoral, a French government agency responsible for the protection of outstanding natural areas on the coast, has announced that it intends to purchase the Capu di Fenu headland and the adjacent coastline. As of 2017 it had acquired 672 hectares (1,660 acres).

== See also ==
- List of Genoese towers in Corsica
