= Torra di Padulella =

Genoese coastal defence tower in Corsica

Tower of Padulella
- Torra di Padulella (Corsican)
- Location within Corsica
- 42°22′29″N 9°31′55″E

History
- Built: Between 1550 and 1565

The Tower of Padulella (Corsican: Torra di Padulella) was a Genoese tower located in the hamlet of Paduella in the commune of San-Nicolao on the east coast of Corsica. No trace of the tower survives.

The tower was built between 1550 and 1565. It was one of a series of coastal defences constructed by the Republic of Genoa between 1530 and 1620 to stem the attacks by Barbary pirates. The Genoese ordered the tower to be destroyed in 1764.

In 2007 the tower was added to the "General Inventory of Cultural Heritage" (Inventaire général du patrimoine culturel) maintained by the French Ministry of Culture.

== See also ==
- List of Genoese towers in Corsica
