= Torra di Galeria =

Genoese coastal defence tower in Corsica

Tower of Galeria
- Torra di Galeria (Corsican)
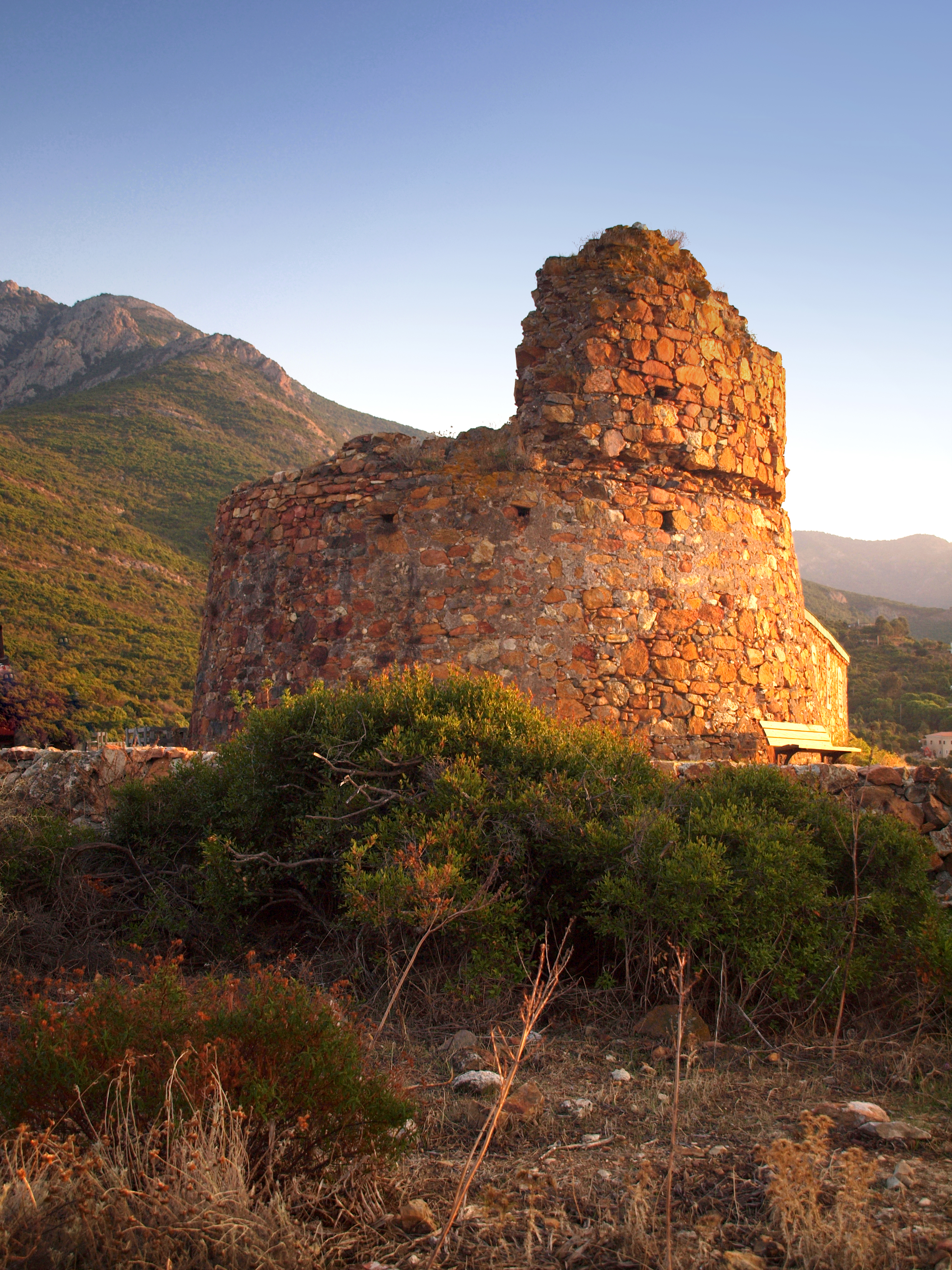

- Location within Corsica
- 42°25′07″N 8°39′27″E

History
- Built: between 1551 and 1573

Monument historique
- Type: Inscrit
- Designated: 22 April 1994
- Reference no.: PA00132605

The Tower of Galeria (Corsican: Torra di Galeria) or Calcinaggia or Calcinaghja is a ruined Genoese tower located in the commune of Galéria (Haute-Corse) on the west coast of the French island of Corsica. The tower sits on the south side of the estuary of the River Fangu.

The Tour de Galéria was built between 1551 and 1573. It was one of a series of coastal defences built by the Republic of Genoa between 1530 and 1620 to stem the attacks by Barbary pirates. It is included in a list compiled by the Genoese authorities in 1617 that records that the tower was guarded by a chief and two soldiers who were paid by the town of Calvi. In 1994 the tower was listed as one of the official historical monuments of France.

The estuary to the north of the tower is owned by an agency of the French state, the Conservatoire du littoral.

== See also ==
- List of Genoese towers in Corsica
