= Torra di Capannella =

Genoese coastal defence tower in Corsica

Tower of Capannella
- Torra di Capannella (Corsican)
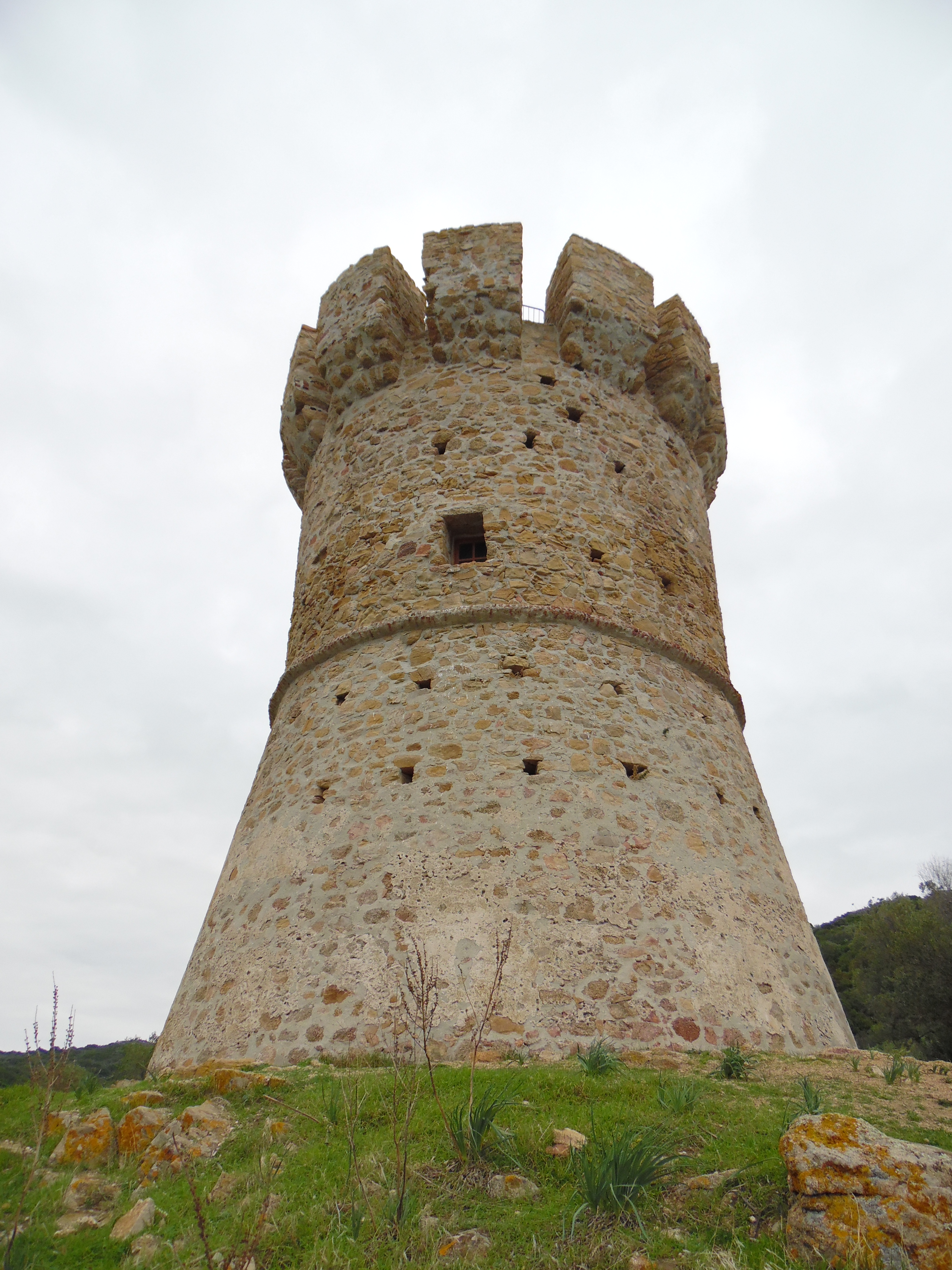

- Location within Corsica
- 41°43′20.2″N 8°47′0.4″E

History
- Built: Second half 16th century

The Tower of Capannella (Corsican: Torra di Capannella) is a Genoese tower located in the commune of Serra-di-Ferro on the west coast of Corsica.

The tower was built in the second half of the 16th century. It was one of a series of coastal defences constructed by the Republic of Genoa between 1530 and 1620 to stem the attacks by Barbary pirates.

In 2002 the tower was added to the Inventaire général du patrimoine culturel maintained by the French Ministère de la culture. It is owned by the state.

== See also ==
- List of Genoese towers in Corsica
