= Torra di Poghju =

Genoese coastal defence tower in Corsica

Tower of Poghju
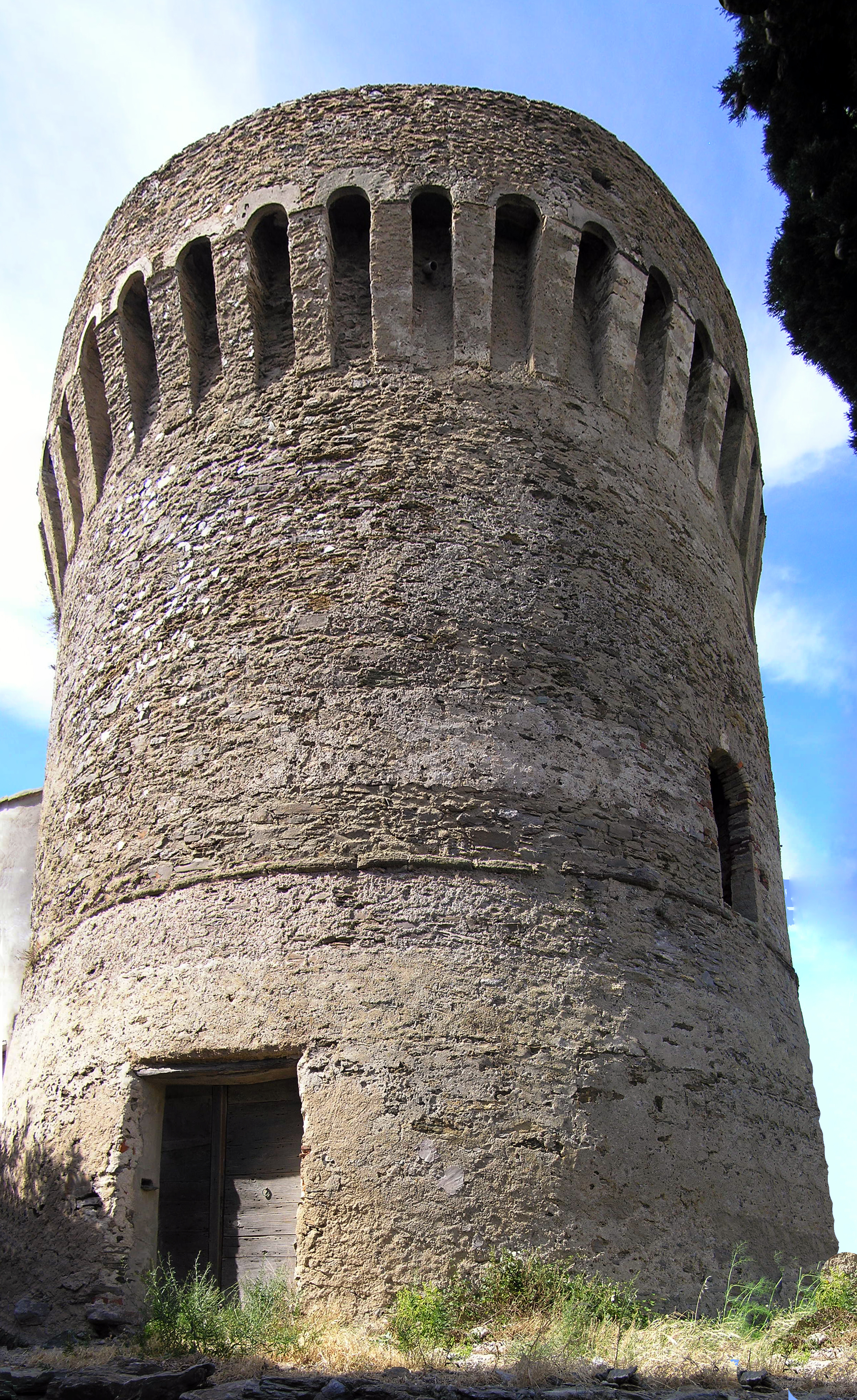

- Location within Corsica
- 42°58′58″N 9°22′22″E

History
- Built: Second half 16th century

The Tower of Poghju (Corsican: Torra di Poghju) is a Genoese tower in Corsica, located in the hamlet of Poggio in the commune of Tomino, Haute-Corse.

The tower was probably built in the second half of the sixteenth century. It was one of a series of defences constructed by the Republic of Genoa between 1530 and 1620 to stem the attacks by Barbary pirates. Although the design is similar to other round Genoese towers built around the Corsican coastline, its position is unusual in being situated within a hamlet at an elevation of 170 metres (560 ft) and several kilometers from the sea.

The base of the tower would have originally contained a cistern to hold rainwater collected from the roof terrace but in the nineteenth century an entrance door was constructed at the ground floor level. In 2009 the tower was added to the "General Inventory of Cultural Heritage" (Inventaire général du patrimoine culturel) maintained by the French Ministry of Culture. It is privately owned.

== See also ==
- List of Genoese towers in Corsica
