= Torra di Senetosa =

Genoese coastal defence tower in Corsica

Tower of Senetosa
- Torra di Senetosa (Corsican)
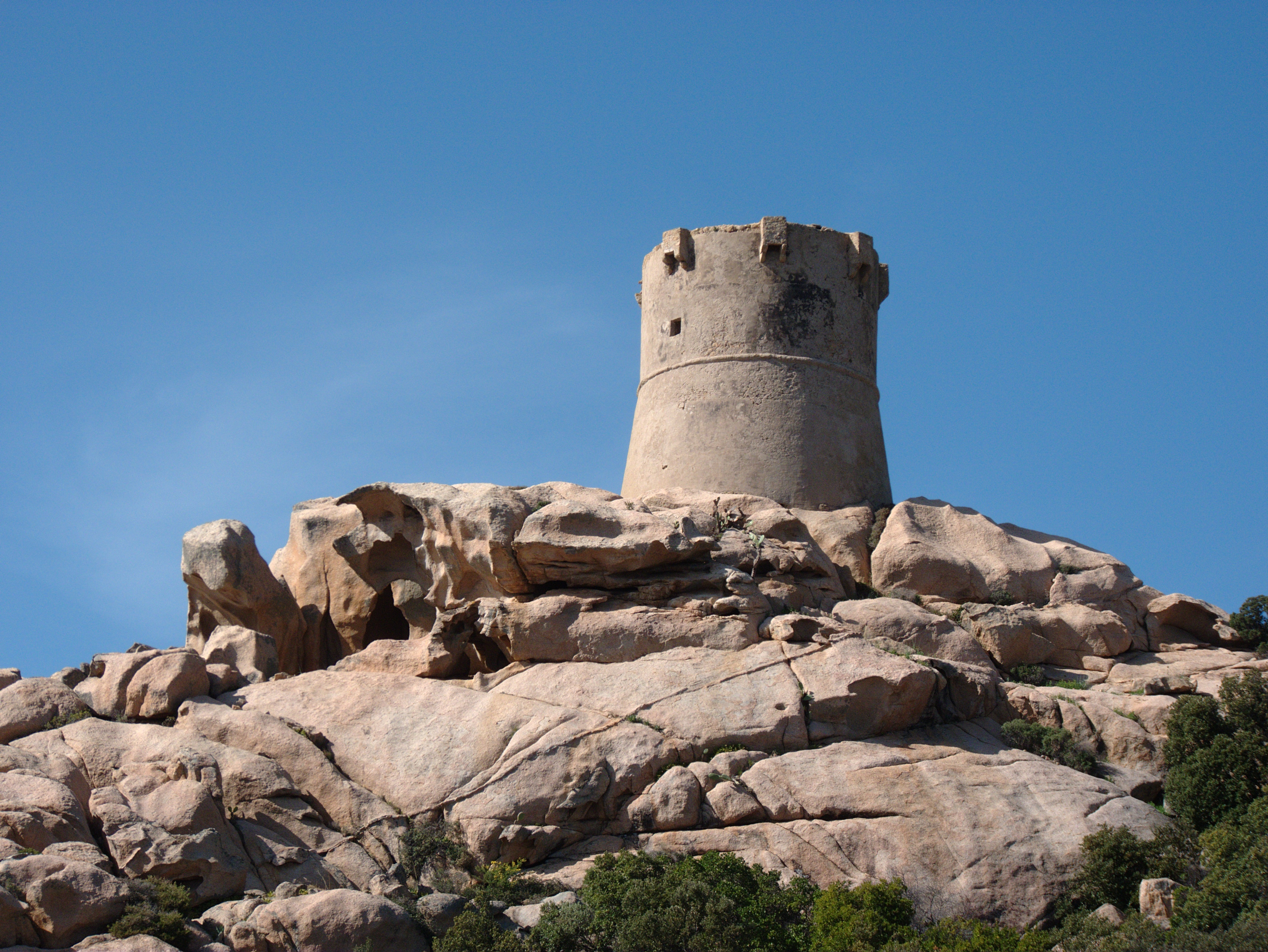

- Location within Corsica
- 41°33′51″N 8°47′55″E

History
- Built: 1610

Monument historique
- Designated: 27 October 1992
- Reference no.: PA00099145

The Tower of Senetosa (Corsican: Torra di Senetosa) is a Genoese tower located in the commune of Sartène (Corse-du-Sud) on the west coast of the Corsica. The tower sits at an elevation of 129 m (423 ft) on the Capu di Senetosa headland.

== History ==
The tower was built in 1610. It was one of a series of coastal defences constructed by the Republic of Genoa between 1530 and 1620 to stem the attacks by Barbary pirates. In 1992, the tower was listed as one of the official historical monuments of France.

Since 1979, the tower has been owned and maintained by the French government agency, the Conservatoire du littoral. The agency plans to purchase 2,378 ha (5,880 acres) of the headland and as of 2011 had acquired 2,333 ha (5,760 acres).

== See also ==
- List of Genoese towers in Corsica
