= Tour de Giottani =

Genoese coastal defence tower in Corsica

Tower of Giottani
- Torra di Giottani (Corsican)
- Interactive map of Tower of Giottani
- 42.8676°N 9.3396°E

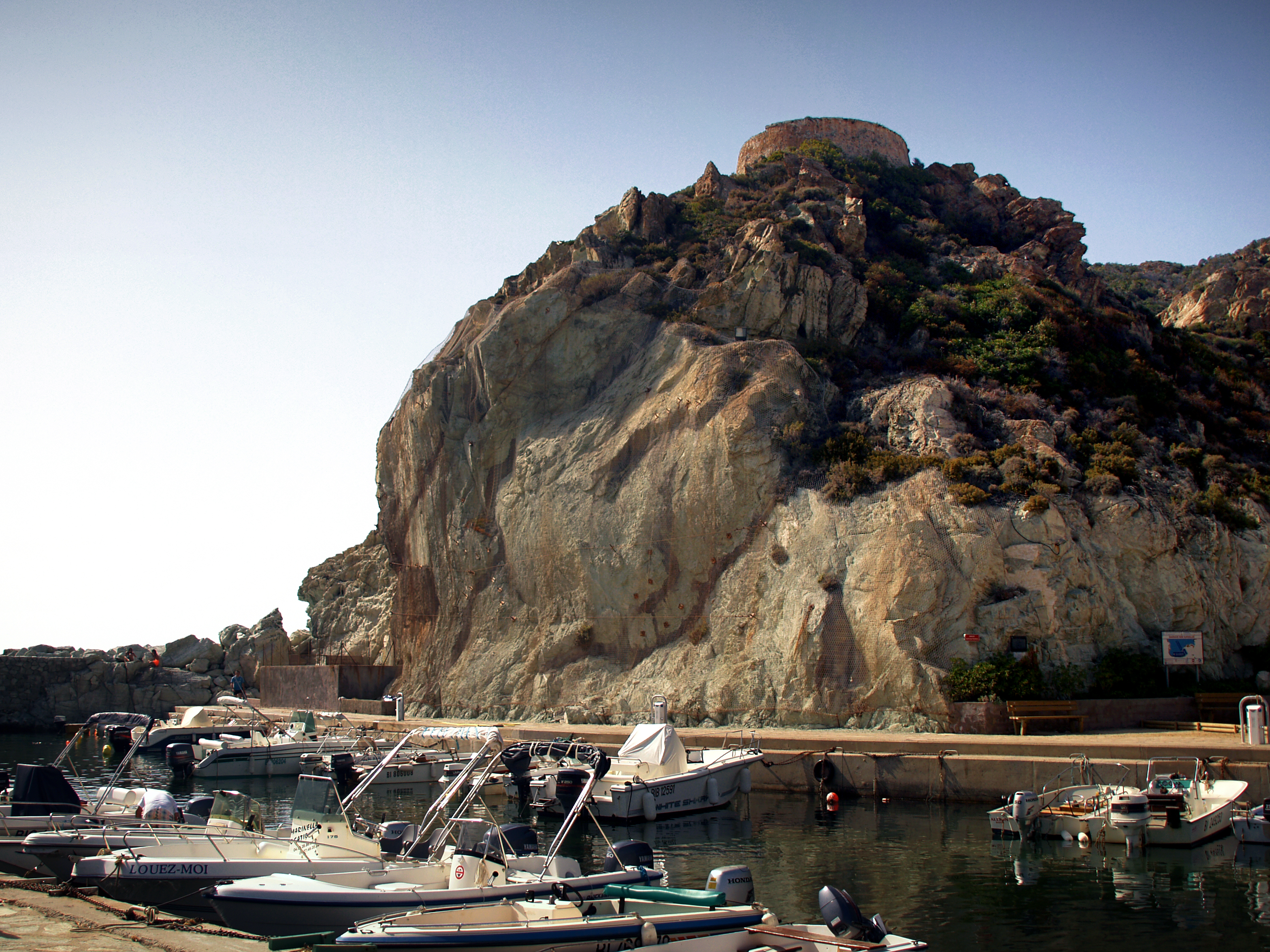

The Tower of Giottani (Corsican: Torra di Giottani) is a ruined Genoese tower on the coast of the commune of Barrettali, northern Corsica.

== See also ==
- List of Genoese towers in Corsica
