= Cantone Grossu Tower =

Genoese coastal defence tower in Corsica

Tower of Cantone Grossu
- torra di Cantone Grossu (Corsican)
- Location within Corsica
- 41°54′30″N 8°42′45″E

History
- Built: Second half 16th century

The Cantone Grossu Tower (Corsican: torra di Cantone Grossu) was a Genoese tower located in the commune of Ajaccio on the west coast of the Corsica. The tower was on the north coast of the Golfe d'Ajaccio between the city and the Pointe de la Parata. No trace of the tower survives.

The tower was one of a series of coastal defences constructed by the Republic of Genoa between 1530 and 1620 to stem the attacks by Barbary pirates. It is included in a list of the towers defending the Corsican coastline compiled by the Genoese authorities in 1617.

== See also ==
- List of Genoese towers in Corsica
