= Torra di Petranera =

Genoese coastal defence tower in Corsica

Tower of Pietranera
- Torra di Petranera (Corsican)
- Location within Corsica
- 42°43′15″N 9°27′21″E

History
- Built: Second half of 16th century

The Tower of Pietranera (Corsican: Torra di Petranera) was a Genoese tower located in the hamlet of Pietranera in the commune of San-Martino-di-Lota on the east coast of Corsica. The tower no longer exists.

The tower was one of a series of coastal defences constructed by the Republic of Genoa between 1530 and 1620 to stem the attacks by Barbary pirates.

== See also ==
- List of Genoese towers in Corsica
