= Torra di Grisgione =

Genoese coastal defence tower in Corsica

Tower of Grisgione
- Torra di Grisgione (Corsican)
- Location within Corsica
- 42°43′59″N 9°27′42″E

History
- Built: Shortly after 1532

The Tower of Grisgione or Tower of Grigione (Corsican: Torra di Grisgione) was a Genoese tower located in the commune of San-Martino-di-Lota on the east coast of Capicorsu on the Corsica. No trace of the tower survives.

The tower was constructed shortly after 1532. It was one of a series of defences constructed by the Republic of Genoa between 1530 and 1620 to stem the attacks by Barbary pirates. The tower is included (as Ghissone) in a list compiled by the Genoese authorities in 1617 that records that the tower was guarded by two men from the local area.

== See also ==
- List of Genoese towers in Corsica
