= Tour de Capriona =

Genoese coastal defence tower in Corsica

- Location within Corsica
- 41°42′28″N 8°47′25″E

History
- Built: Second half 16th century

The Tour de Capriona or Tour de Porto Pollo (Corsican: Torra di Capriona) is a Genoese tower located in the commune of Serra-di-Ferro near the village of Porto Pollo on the west coast of Corsica. Only part of the base survives.

The tower was built in the second half of the 16th century. It was one of a series of coastal defences constructed by the Republic of Genoa between 1530 and 1620 to stem the attacks by Barbary pirates.

== See also ==
- List of Genoese towers in Corsica
