= Torra di Furiani =

Genoese coastal defence tower in Corsica

Tower of Furiani
- Torra di Furiani (Corsican)
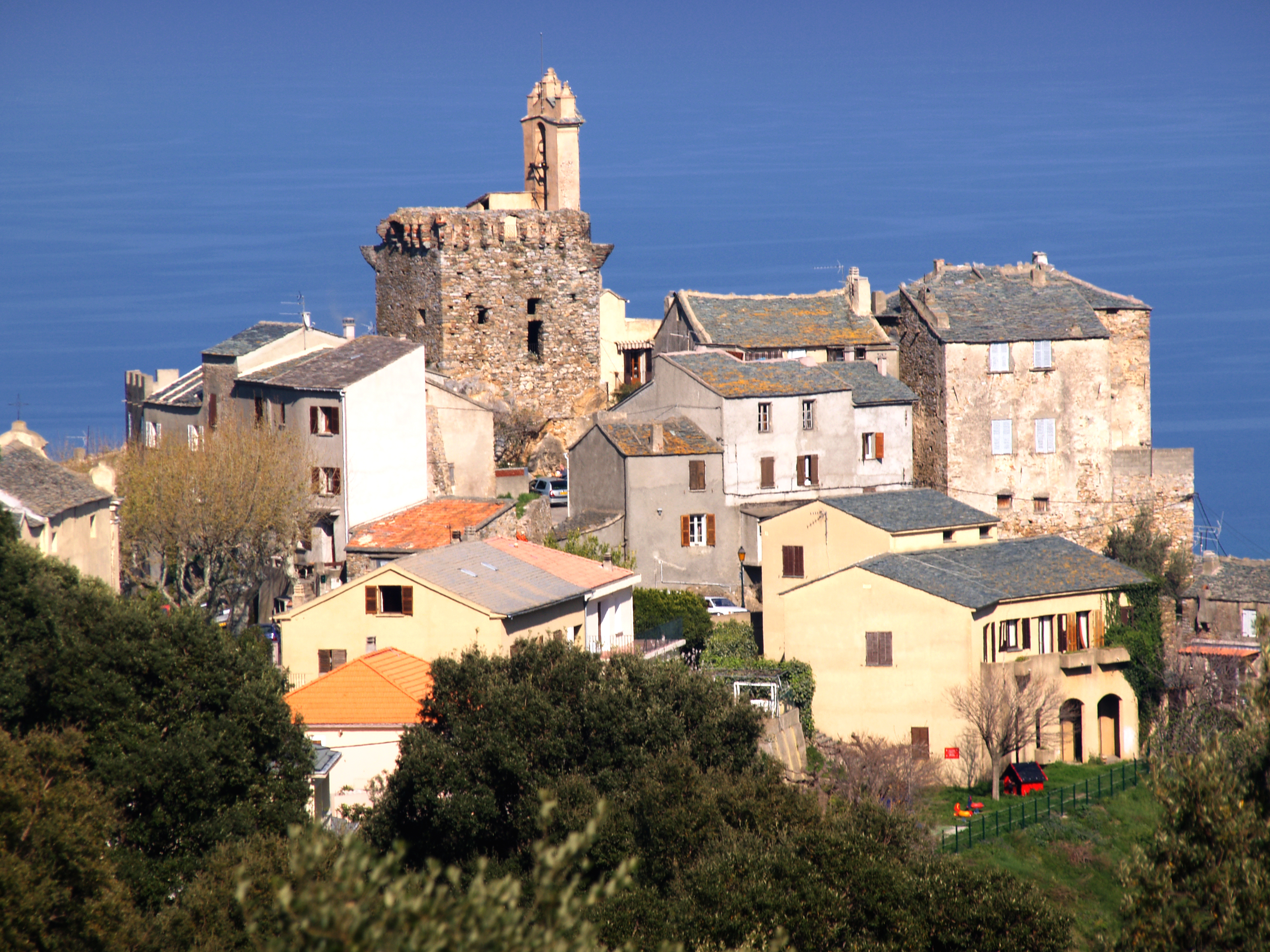

- Location within Corsica
- 42°39′30.4″N 9°24′52.7″E

History
- Built: Second half 16th century

Monument historique
- Designated: 29 July 1987
- Reference no.: PA00099199

The Tower of Furiani (Corsican: Torra di Furiani) is a Genoese tower located in the commune of Furiani on the Corsica. The square tower stands within the village which is 220 metres (720 ft) above sea level.

The tower was one of a series of defences constructed by the Republic of Genoa between 1530 and 1620 to stem the attacks by Barbary pirates.

In 1987 the tower was listed as one of the official historical monuments of France.

== See also ==
- List of Genoese towers in Corsica
