= Torra di Sant'Amanza =

Genoese coastal defence tower in Corsica

Tower of Sant'Amanza
- Torra di Sant'Amanza (Corsican)
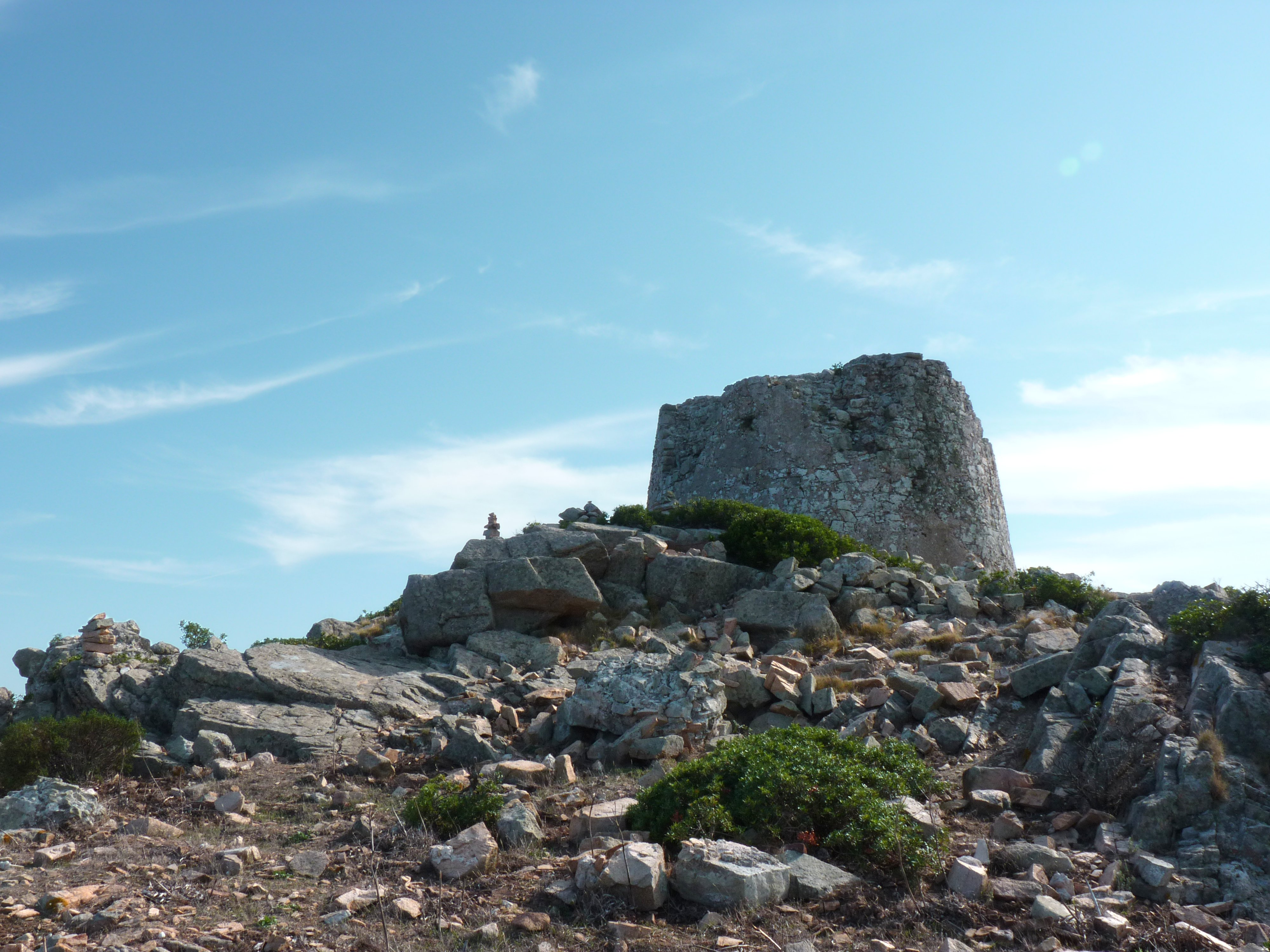

- Location within Corsica
- 41°25′0″N 9°15′20″E

History
- Built: Second half of 16th century

The Tower of Sant'Amanza (Corsican: Torra di Sant'Amanza) is a ruined Genoese tower located in the commune of Bonifacio on the south east coast of the Corsica. The tower sits at a height of 125 metres (410 ft) on the Punta di u Capicciolu headland. Only the round base survives.

The tower was one of a series of coastal defences constructed by the Republic of Genoa between 1530 and 1620 to stem the attacks by Barbary pirates.

The Conservatoire du littoral, a French government agency responsible for the protection of outstanding natural areas on the coast, has announced that it intends to purchase the Punta di u Capicciolu headland. As of 2017 it had acquired 38 hectares (94 acres).

== See also ==
- List of Genoese towers in Corsica
