= Torra d'Asprettu =

Genoese coastal defence tower in Corsica

Tower of Asprettu
- Torra d'Asprettu (Corsican)
- Location within Corsica
- 41°55′37″N 8°45′40″E

History
- Built: 1582

The Tower of Asprettu (Corsican: Torra d'Asprettu) was a Genoese tower near to Ajaccio on the west coast of the Corsica. No trace of the tower survives.

The tower was one of a series of coastal defences constructed by the Republic of Genoa between 1530 and 1620 to stem the attacks by Barbary pirates. It was built for Agostino Bonaparte in 1582 and is included in a list of the towers defending the Corsican coastline compiled by the Genoese authorities in 1617.

== See also ==
- List of Genoese towers in Corsica
