= Tour de L'Île-Rousse =

Genoese coastal defence tower in Corsica

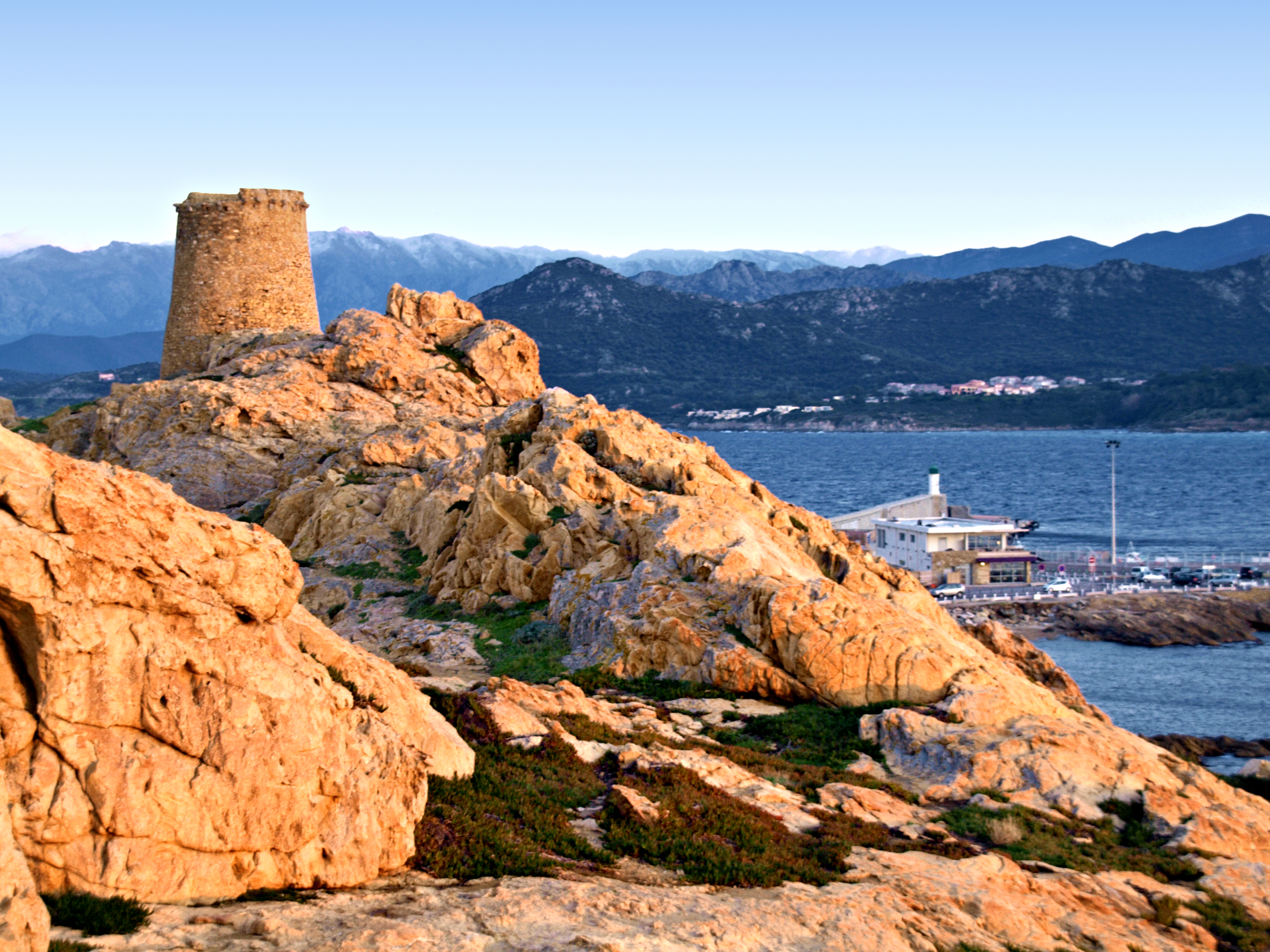

- Location within Corsica
- 42°38′36.4″N 8°56′6.6″E

History
- Built: Second half 16th century

The Tour de L'Île-Rousse (Corsican: Torra di l'Isula Rossa) is a ruined Genoese tower located on the Île de la Petra in the commune of L'Île-Rousse off the west coast of the French island of Corsica.

The tower was one of a series of coastal defences constructed by the Republic of Genoa between 1530 and 1620 to stem the attacks by Barbary pirates.

== See also ==
- List of Genoese towers in Corsica
