= Torra di Punta d'Arcu =

Genoese coastal defence tower in Corsica

Tower of Punta d'Arcu
- Torra di Punta d'Arcu (Corsican)
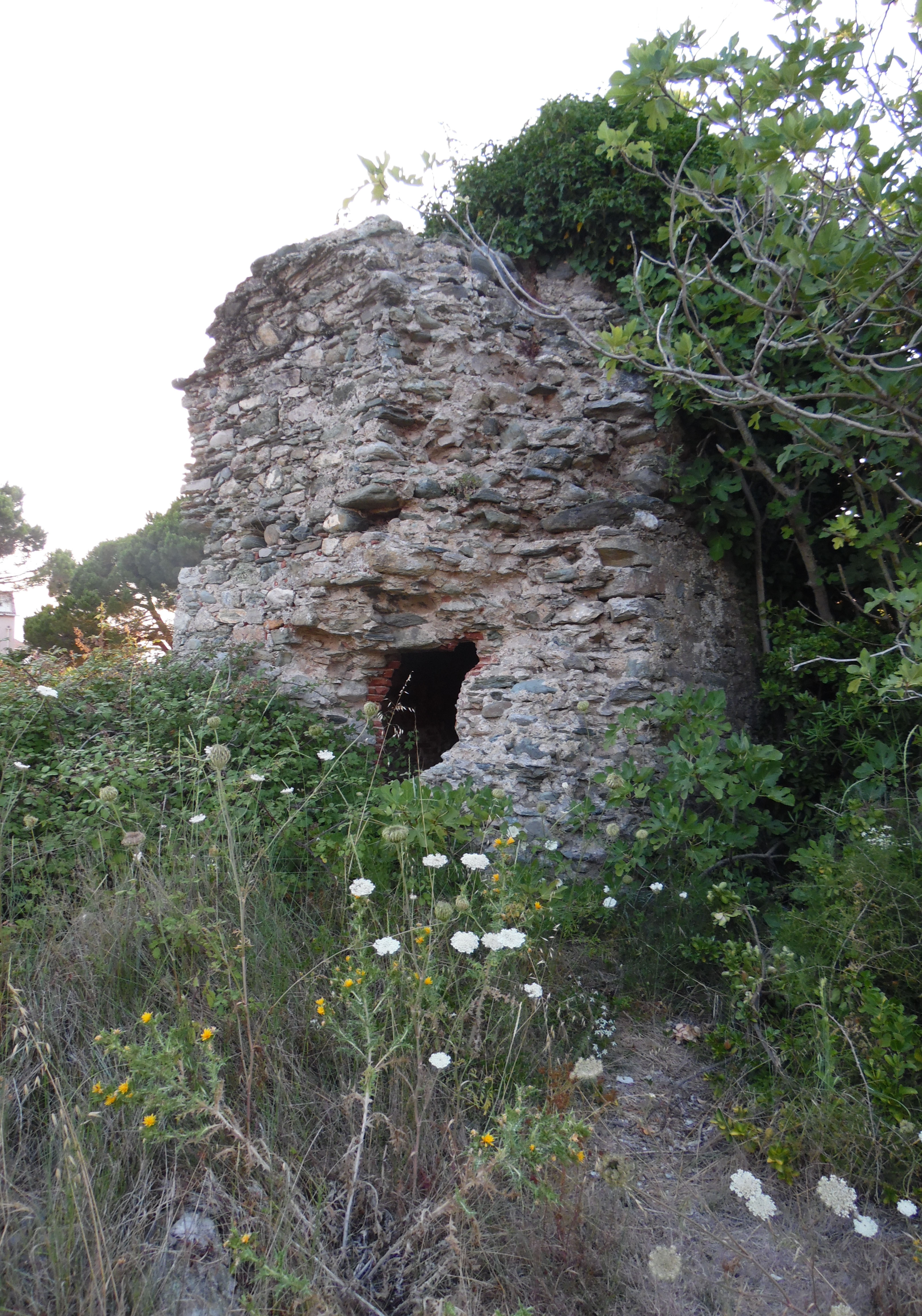

- Location within Corsica
- 42°33′51.9″N 9°31′25.8″E

History
- Built: Second half of 16th century

The Tower of Punta d'Arcu (Corsican: Torra di Punta d'Arcu) is a ruined Genoese tower located in the commune of Borgo, Haute-Corse on the east coast of Corsica. Only part of the base survives.

The tower was one of a series of coastal defences constructed by the Republic of Genoa between 1530 and 1620 to stem the attacks by Barbary pirates. It is included in a list of the towers defending the Corsican coastline compiled by the Genoese authorities in 1617 (as Ponte darco).

== See also ==
- List of Genoese towers in Corsica
