= Torra di Tizzà =

Genoese coastal defence tower in Corsica

Tower of Tizzà
- Torra di Tizzà (Corsican)
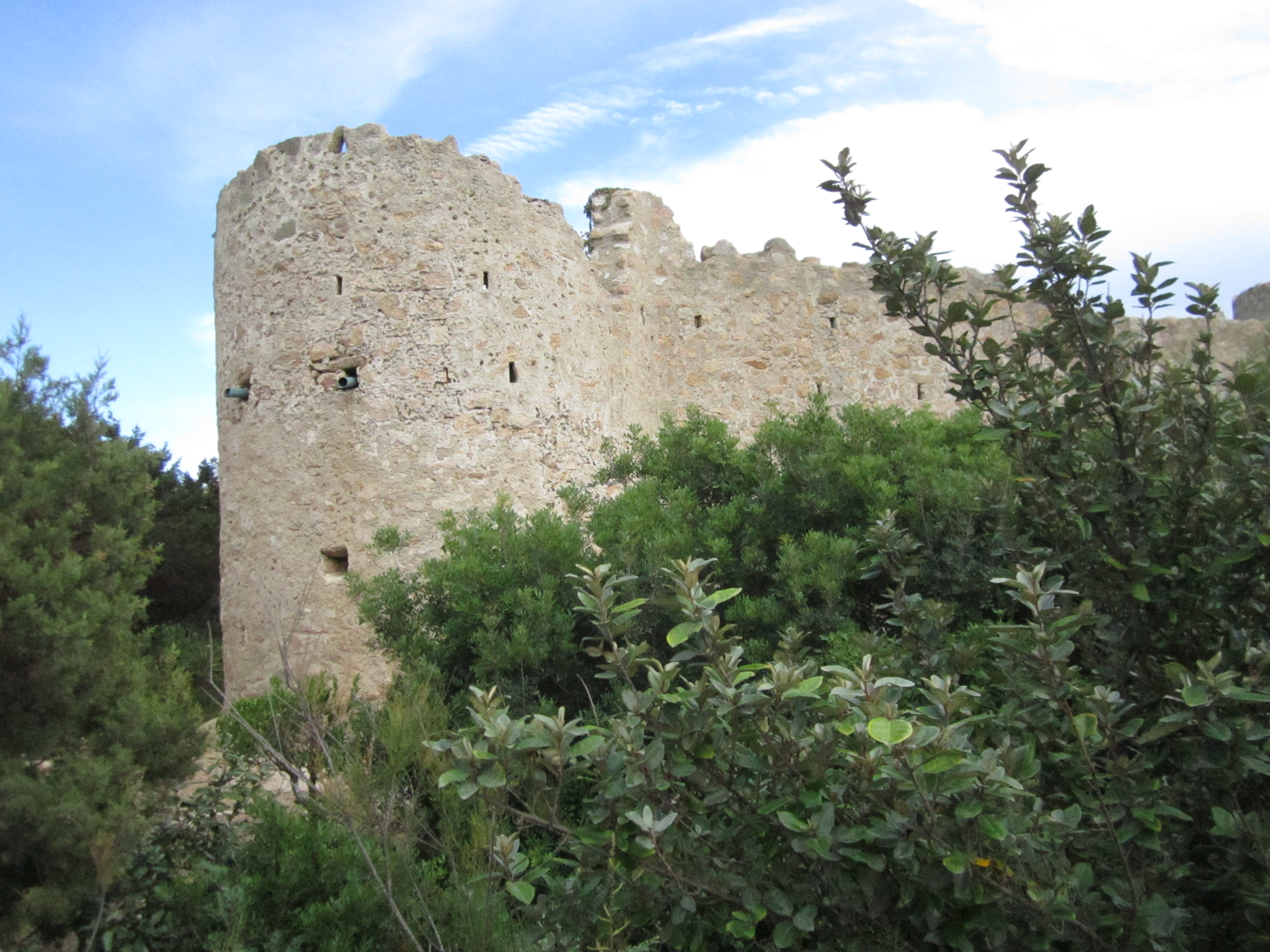

- Location within Corsica
- 41°32′32″N 8°50′49″E

History
- Built: Second half 16th century

Monument historique
- Designated: 6 Septembre 1985
- Reference no.: PA00099117

The Tower of Tizzà (Corsican: Torra di Tizzà) is a Genoese tower located in the commune of Sartène on the west coast of the Corsica. The tower was one of a series of coastal defences constructed by the Republic of Genoa between 1530 and 1620 to stem the attacks by Barbary pirates.

In 1985 the tower was listed as one of the official historical monuments of France.

== See also ==
- List of Genoese towers in Corsica
