= Torra di Solenzara =

Genoese coastal defence tower in Corsica

Tower of Solenzara
- Torra di Solenzara (Corsican)
- Location within Corsica
- 41°51′32″N 9°23′59″E

History
- Built: Second half of 16th century

The Tower of Solenzara (Corsican: Torra di Solenzara) was a Genoese tower located in the commune of Sari-Solenzara on the east coast of the Corsica. No trace of the tower survives.

The tower was one of a series of coastal defences constructed by the Republic of Genoa between 1530 and 1620 to stem the attacks by Barbary pirates.

== See also ==
- List of Genoese towers in Corsica
