= Torra di Vignale =

Genoese coastal defence tower in Corsica

Tower of Vignale
- Torra di Vignale (Corsican)
- Location within Corsica
- 42°0′21″N 9°27′25″E

History
- Built: Second half of 16th century

The Tower of Vignale (Corsican: Torra di Vignale) was a Genoese tower located in the commune of Ghisonaccia on the east coast of the Corsica. No trace of the tower survives.

The tower was one of a series of coastal defences constructed by the Republic of Genoa between 1530 and 1620 to stem the attacks by Barbary pirates.

== See also ==
- List of Genoese towers in Corsica
