= Torra di Sponsaglia =

Genoese coastal defence tower in Corsica

Tower of Sponsaglia
- Torra di Sponsaglia (Corsican)
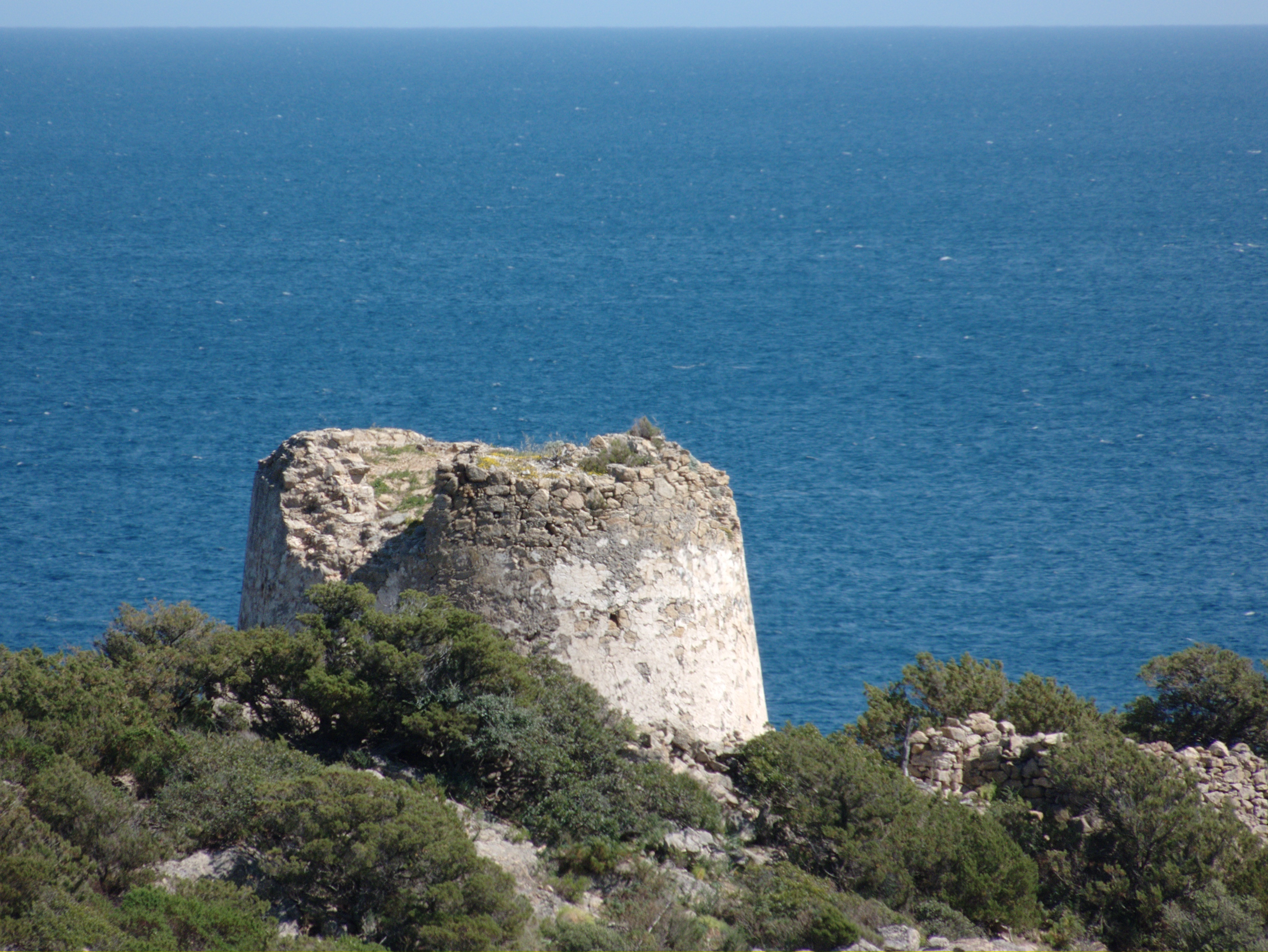

- Location within Corsica
- 41°29′3″N 9°17′14″E

History
- Built: Second half of 16th century

The Tower of Sponsaglia (Corsican: Torra di Sponsaglia) is a ruined Genoese tower located on the border between the communes of Bonifacio, Corse-du-Sud and Porto-Vecchio on the south east coast of the Corsica. Only the round base survives.

The tower was one of a series of coastal defences constructed by the Republic of Genoa between 1530 and 1620 to stem the attacks by Barbary pirates.

== See also ==
- List of Genoese towers in Corsica
