= Torra di Vallitone =

Genoese coastal defence tower in Corsica

Tower of Vallitone
- Torra di Vallitone (Corsican)

Monument historique

The Tower of Vallitone (Corsican: Torra di Vallitone) is a tower in Corsica.

== See also ==
- List of Genoese towers in Corsica
