= Torra di Caldanu =

Genoese coastal defence tower in Corsica

Tower of Caldanu
- Torra di Caldanu (Corsican)
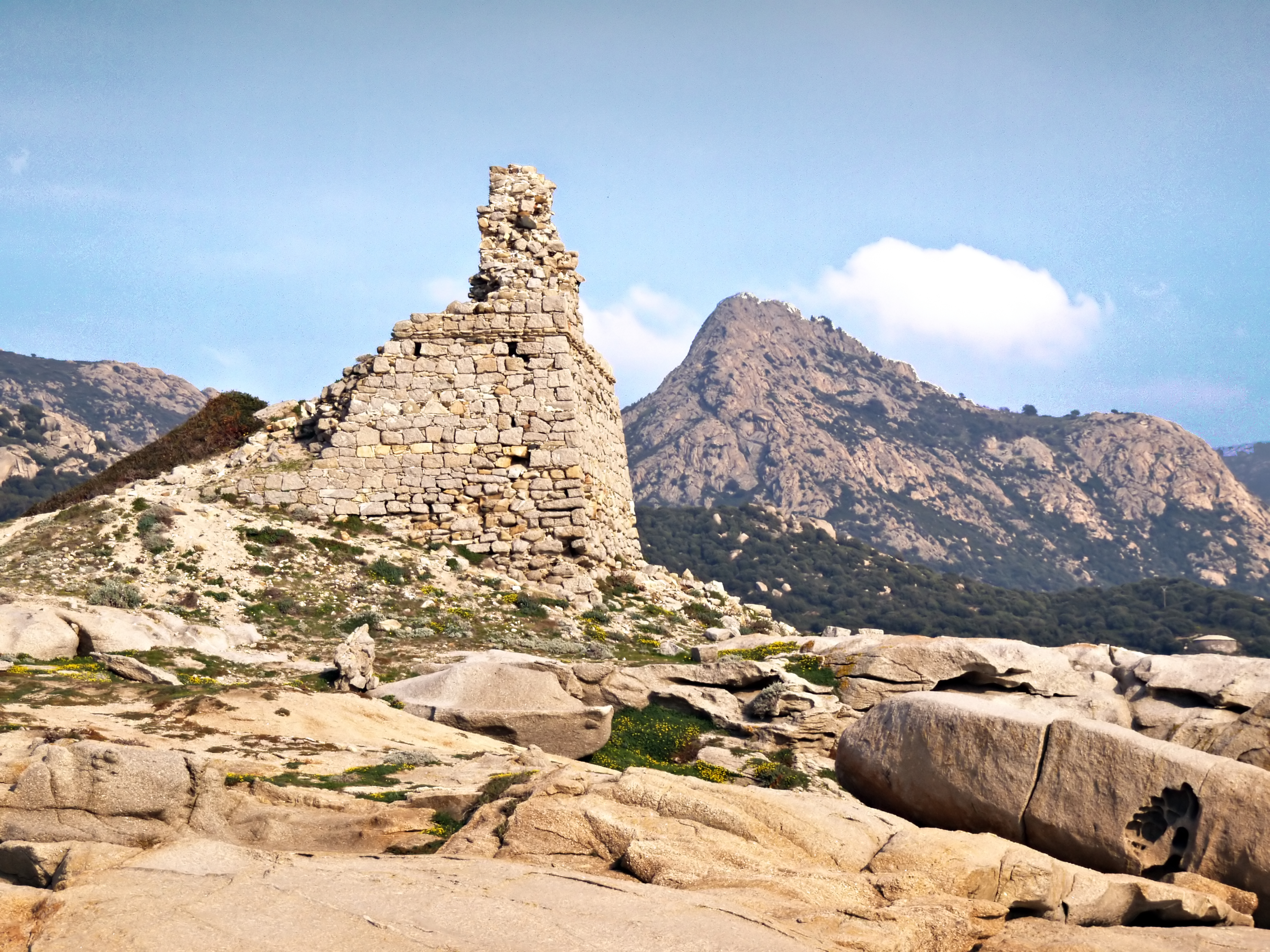

- Location within Corsica
- 42°34′58″N 8°47′59″E

History
- Built: Second half 16th century

The Tower of Caldanu (Corsican: Torra di Caldanu) is a ruined Genoese tower located in the commune of Lumio on the west coast of Corsica.

The tower was built in the second half of the 16th century. It was one of a series of coastal defences constructed by the Republic of Genoa between 1530 and 1620 to stem the attacks by Barbary pirates.

== See also ==
- List of Genoese towers in Corsica
