= Tour de Capitello =

Genoese coastal defence tower in Corsica

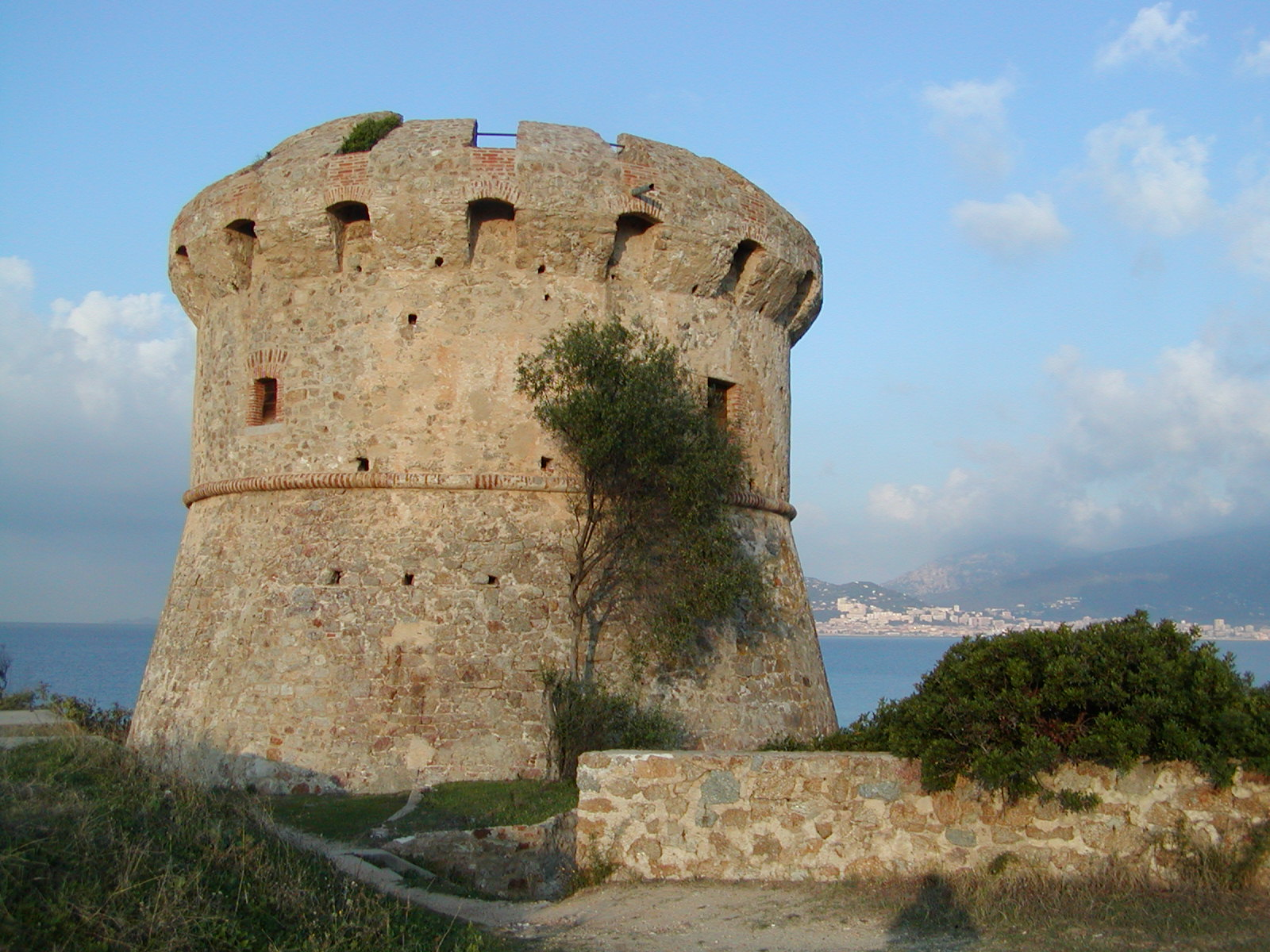

- Location within Corsica
- 41°54′15″N 8°47′57″E

History
- Built: 1552

Monument historique
- Designated: 8 March 1991
- Reference no.: PA00099137

The Tour de Capitello (Corsican: Torra di Capiteddu) is a Genoese tower located in the commune of Grosseto-Prugna (Corse-du-Sud) on the coast of the French island of Corsica. The tower lies to the south of Ajaccio near the Porticcio beach.

The construction of the tower was begun in 1552. It is one of a series of coastal defences constructed by the Republic of Genoa between 1530 and 1620 to stem the attacks by Barbary pirates. The roof terrace of the tower was modified during the Second World War. The tower is now owned by the commune and in 1991 was listed as one of the official historical monuments of France.

== See also ==
- List of Genoese towers in Corsica
