= Leccia =

Leccia is a surname. Notable people with the surname include:

- Ange Leccia (born 1952), French painter, photographer and film-maker
- Francisco Mago Leccia (1931–2004), Venezuelan ichthyologist
- Jessica Leccia (born 1976), American actress

== See also ==
- Ponte Leccia, village in Corsica
