= Torra di Cargali =

Genoese coastal defence tower in Corsica

Monument historique

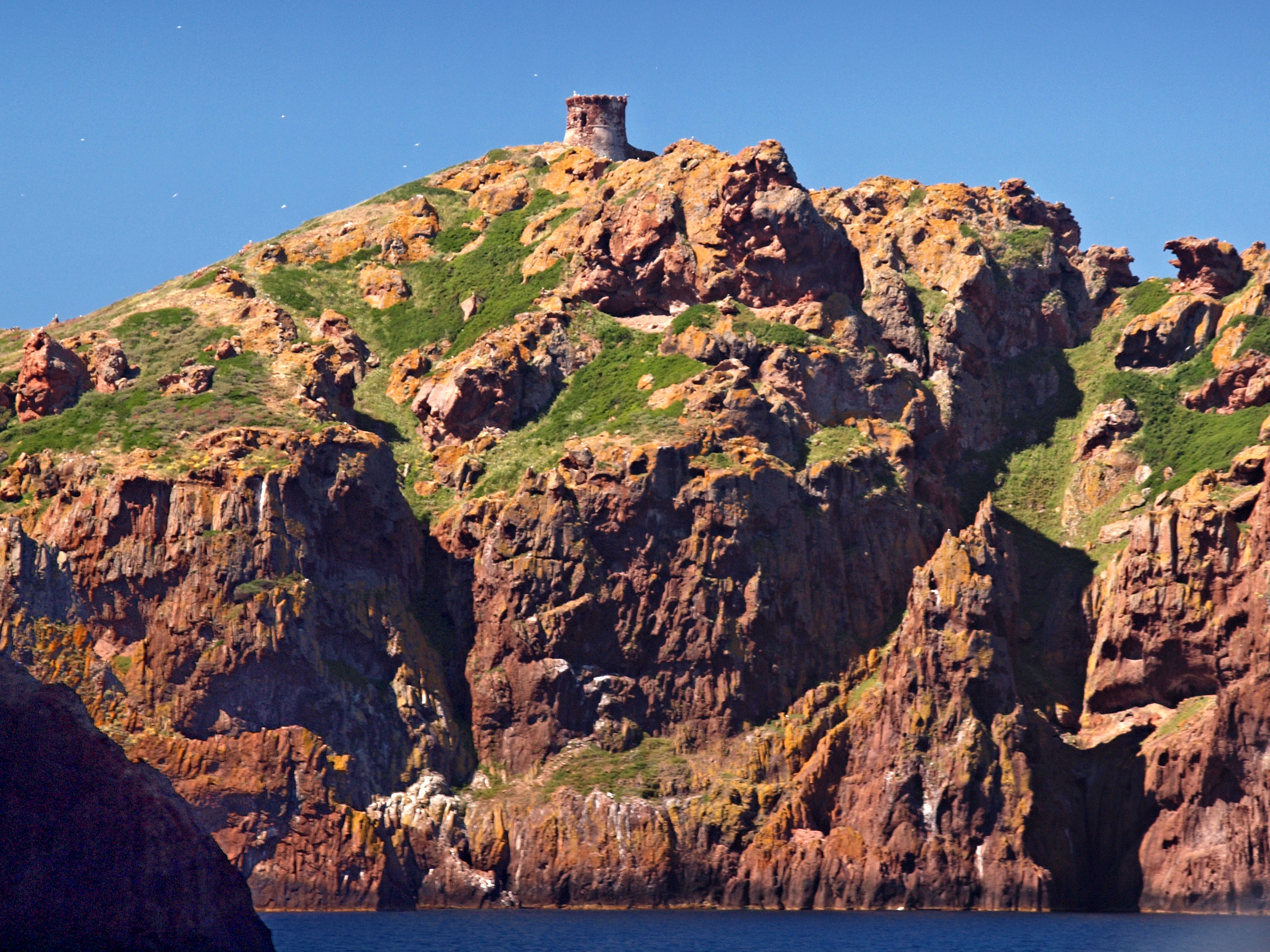
Torra di Cargali

(See "Torra di l'Isula di Gargali") The Torra di Cargali is a tower in Corsica.
