= Serra-di-Ferro =

Commune in Corsica, France

Serra-di-Ferro Sarra-di-Farru
- Commune
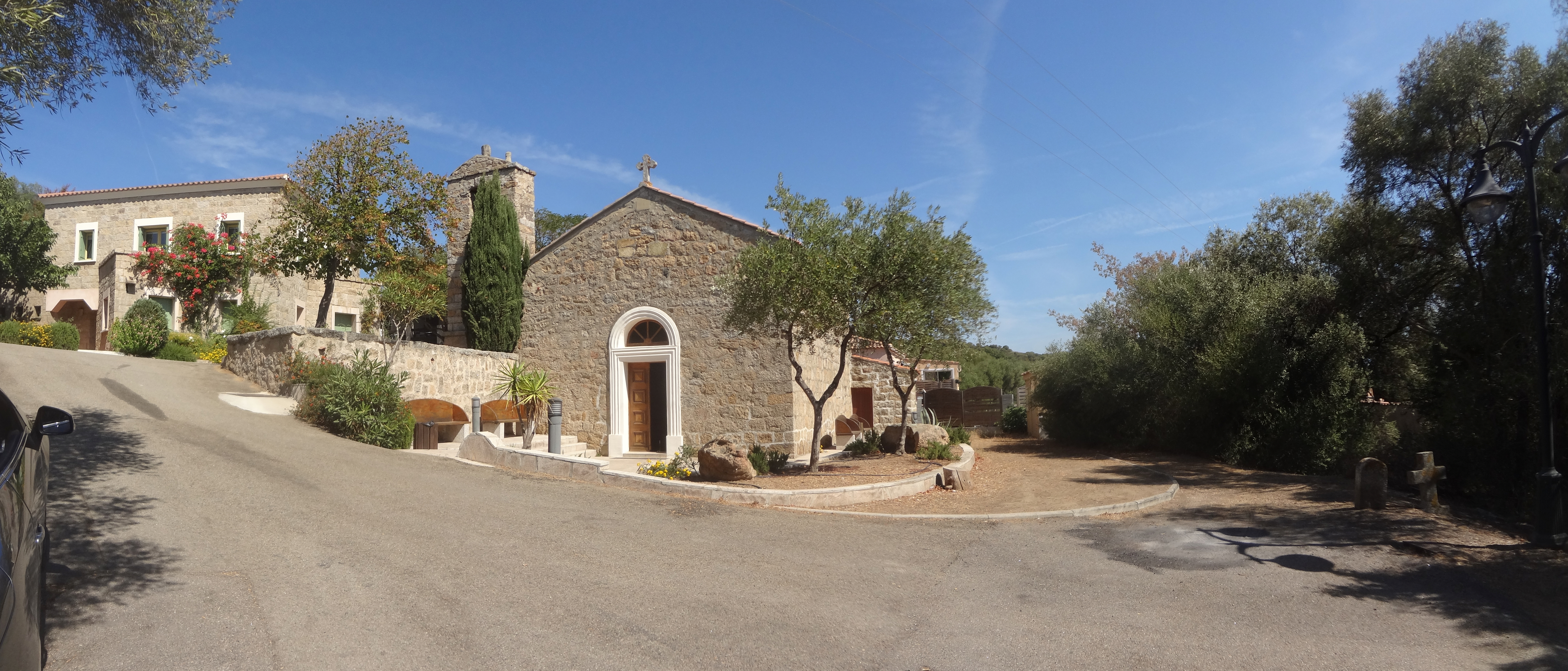
- The chapel in Serra-di-Ferro
- Location of Serra-di-Ferro
- Location within France Location within Corsica
- Coordinates: 41°43′50″N 8°47′58″E
- Country: France
- Region: Corsica
- Department: Corse-du-Sud
- Arrondissement: Ajaccio
- Canton: Taravo-Ornano

Government
  - Mayor (2020–2026): Jean Alfonsi
- Area^{1}: 32 km^{2} (12 sq mi)
- Highest elevation: 140 m (460 ft)
- Lowest elevation: 0 m (0 ft)
- Population (2023): 727
  - Density: 23/km^{2} (59/sq mi)
- Time zone: UTC+01:00 (CET)
  - Summer (DST): UTC+02:00 (CEST)
- INSEE/Postal code: 2A276 /20140
- ^{1} French Land Register data, which excludes lakes, ponds, glaciers > 1 km^{2} (0.386 sq mi or 247 acres) and river estuaries.

Serra-di-Ferro (French pronunciation: [sɛʁa di fɛʁo]; Corsican: Sarra di Farru) is a commune in the Corse-du-Sud department of France on the island of Corsica.

== Population ==
Historical population
Year	Pop.	±% p.a.
1968	284	—
1975	334	+2.34%
1982	342	+0.34%
1990	327	−0.56%
1999	352	+0.82%
2007	427	+2.44%
2012	497	+3.08%
2017	482	−0.61%
2023	727	+7.09%
Source: INSEE

== Sights ==
- Torra di Capriona
- Tour de Capannella

== See also ==
- Communes of the Corse-du-Sud department
