= Borgo, Haute-Corse =

Borgo U Borgu (Corsican)
- Commune
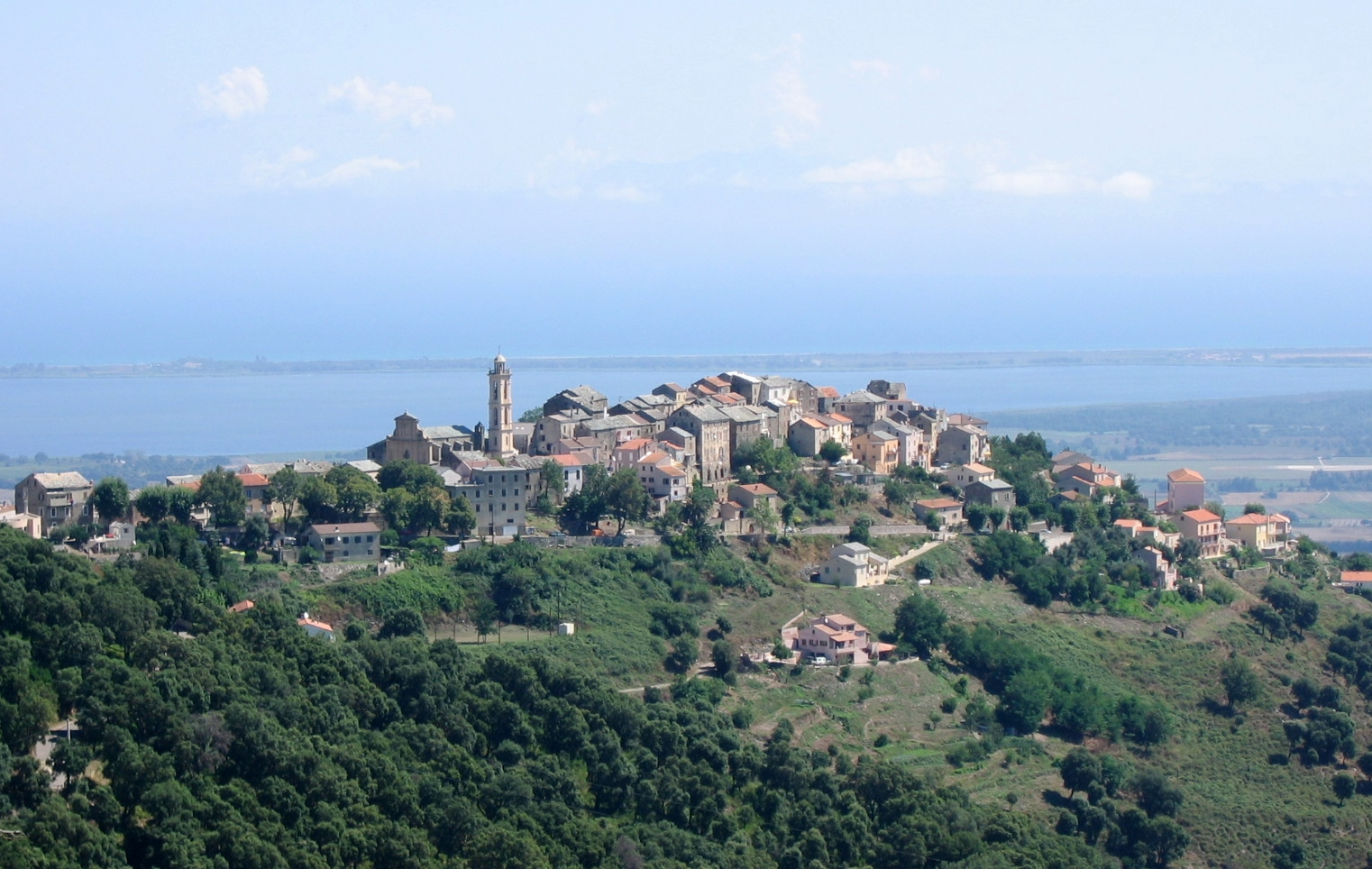
- The village of Borgo overlooking the plain and part of the lake of Biguglia, and the lagoon of Marana

- Coat of arms
- Location of Borgo
- Location within France Location within Corsica
- Coordinates: 42°33′17″N 9°25′41″E
- Country: France
- Region: Corsica
- Department: Haute-Corse
- Arrondissement: Bastia
- Canton: Borgo

Government
  - Mayor (2020–2026): Anne-Marie Natali
- Area^{1}: 37.78 km^{2} (14.59 sq mi)
- Elevation: 320 m (1,050 ft)
- Highest elevation: 1,117 m (3,665 ft)
- Lowest elevation: 0 m (0 ft)
- Population (2023): 10,311
  - Density: 272.9/km^{2} (706.9/sq mi)
- Time zone: UTC+01:00 (CET)
  - Summer (DST): UTC+02:00 (CEST)
- INSEE/Postal code: 2B042 /20290
- ^{1} French Land Register data, which excludes lakes, ponds, glaciers > 1 km^{2} (0.386 sq mi or 247 acres) and river estuaries.

Borgo (Italian pronunciation: [ˈborɡo]; French: [bɔʁɡo]; Corsican: U Borgu) is a commune in the Haute-Corse department of France on the island of Corsica.

The Bastia-Poretta Airport is located in Borgo. It was the site of the 1768 Battle of Borgo during the French Conquest of Corsica when a French force was defeated by Corsican troops.

== Population ==
Historical population

Year	Pop.	±% p.a.
1800	431	—
1806	459	+1.05%
1821	430	−0.43%
1831	589	+3.20%
1836	627	+1.26%
1841	687	+1.84%
1846	675	−0.35%
1851	677	+0.06%
1856	690	+0.38%
1861	761	+1.98%
1866	717	−1.18%
1872	787	+1.56%
1876	717	−2.30%
1881	723	+0.17%
1886	803	+2.12%
1891	849	+1.12%
1896	903	+1.24%
1901	959	+1.21%

Year	Pop.	±% p.a.
1906	1,203	+4.64%
1911	1,023	−3.19%
1921	746	−3.11%
1926	714	−0.87%
1931	789	+2.02%
1936	806	+0.43%
1946	725	−1.05%
1954	913	+2.92%
1962	726	−2.82%
1968	1,600	+14.08%
1975	2,650	+7.47%
1982	3,413	+3.68%
1990	3,773	+1.26%
1999	5,002	+3.18%
2007	7,030	+4.35%
2012	7,950	+2.49%
2017	8,760	+1.96%
2023	10,311	+2.75%

Source: EHESS and INSEE (1968-2023)

== Sights ==
- Torra di Punta d'Arcu

== See also ==
- Communes of the Haute-Corse department
