= Furiani =

- Commune
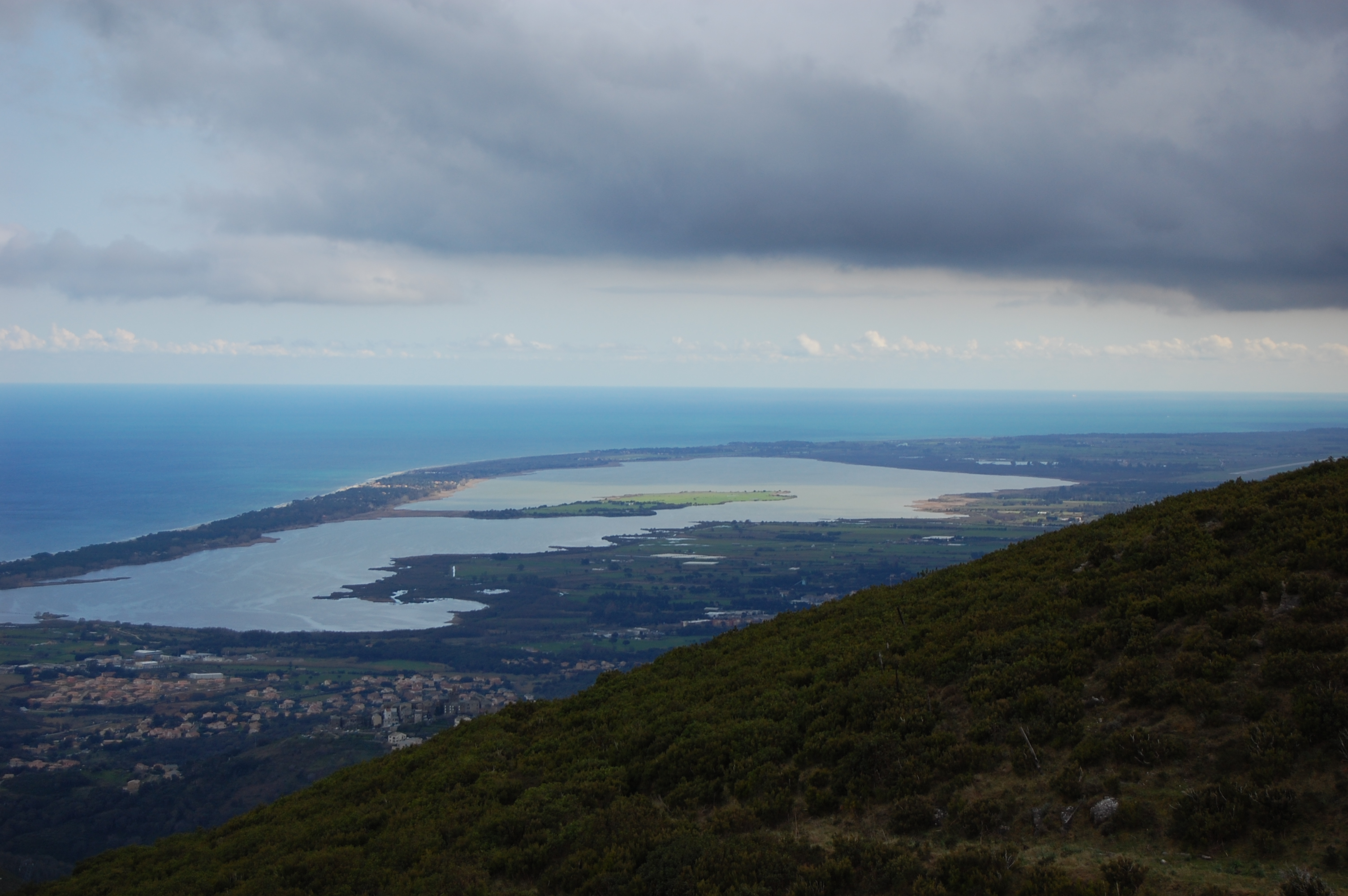
- Étang de Baguglia
- Location of Furiani
- Location within France Location within Corsica
- Coordinates: 42°39′32″N 9°24′54″E
- Country: France
- Region: Corsica
- Department: Haute-Corse
- Arrondissement: Bastia
- Canton: Bastia-4
- Intercommunality: CA Bastia

Government
  - Mayor (2020–2026): Pierre-Michel Simonpietri
- Area^{1}: 18.49 km^{2} (7.14 sq mi)
- Elevation: 150 m (490 ft)
- Highest elevation: 720 m (2,360 ft)
- Lowest elevation: 0 m (0 ft)
- Population (2023): 6,585
  - Density: 356.1/km^{2} (922.4/sq mi)
- Demonym(s): Furianais.e (FR) furianincu, furianinca (CO) furianese (IT)
- Time zone: UTC+01:00 (CET)
  - Summer (DST): UTC+02:00 (CEST)
- INSEE/Postal code: 2B120 /20600
- ^{1} French Land Register data, which excludes lakes, ponds, glaciers > 1 km^{2} (0.386 sq mi or 247 acres) and river estuaries.

Furiani (Italian pronunciation: [fuˈrjaːni]; French: [fuʁjani]) is a commune in the Haute-Corse department, on the island of Corsica, France.

== Population ==
Historical population
| Year | Pop. | ±% p.a. |
|---|---|---|
| 1968 | 414 | — |
| 1975 | 565 | +4.54% |
| 1982 | 1,323 | +12.92% |
| 1990 | 3,286 | +12.04% |
| 1999 | 3,902 | +1.93% |
| 2007 | 4,677 | +2.29% |
| 2012 | 5,591 | +3.63% |
| 2017 | 5,628 | +0.13% |
| 2023 | 6,585 | +2.65% |
Source: INSEE

== See also ==
- Communes of the Haute-Corse department
- Tour de Furiani
- Stade Armand-Cesari and Stade Armand-Cesari disaster
- Railway stations in Corsica
