= Lumio =

- Commune
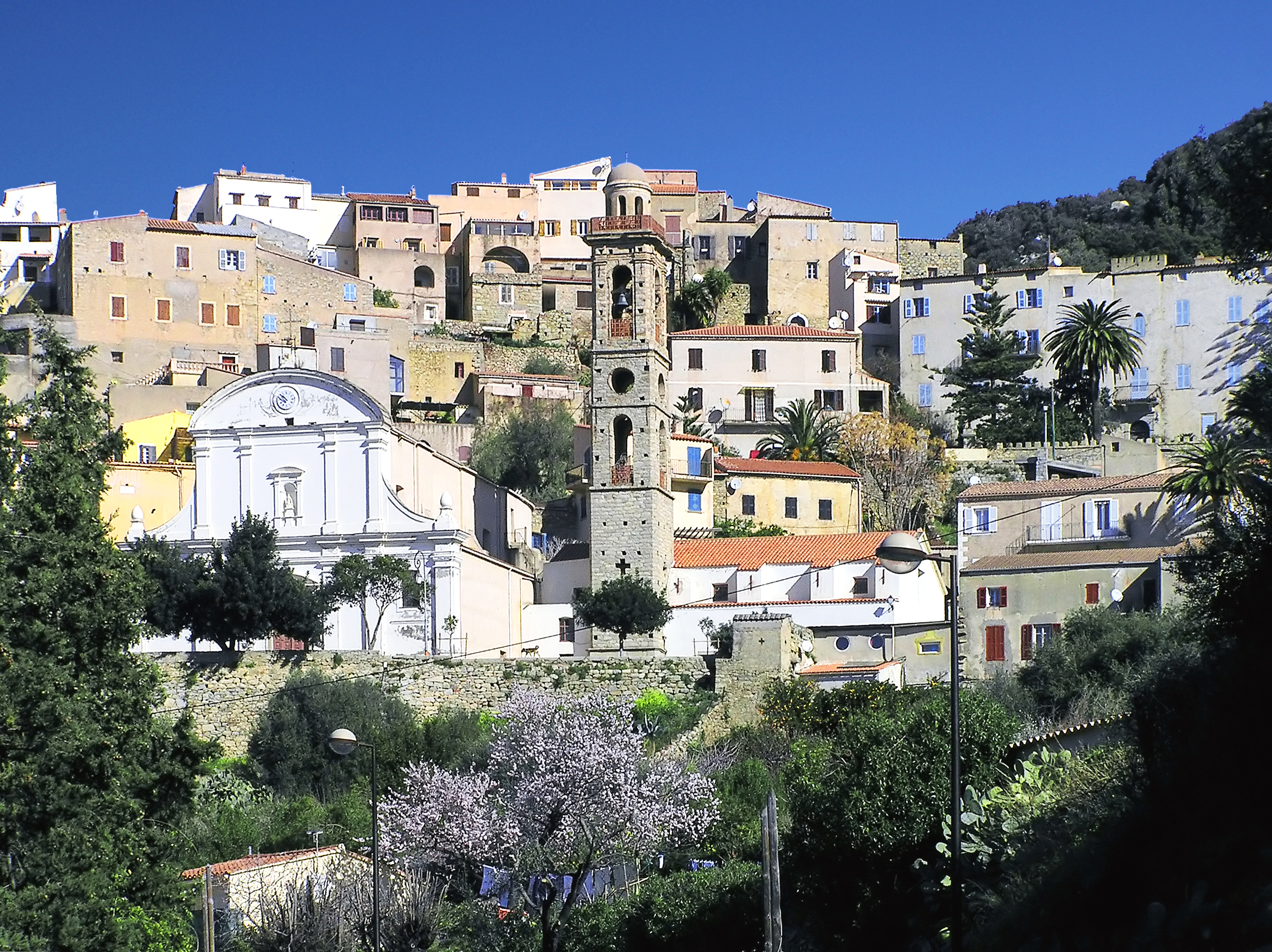
- The buildings surrounding the bell tower in Lumio
- Location of Lumio
- Location within France Location within Corsica
- Coordinates: 42°34′46″N 8°50′02″E
- Country: France
- Region: Corsica
- Department: Haute-Corse
- Arrondissement: Calvi
- Canton: Calvi
- Intercommunality: Calvi Balagne

Government
  - Mayor (2020–2026): Etienne Suzzoni
- Area^{1}: 19.18 km^{2} (7.41 sq mi)
- Elevation: 200 m (660 ft)
- Highest elevation: 561 m (1,841 ft)
- Lowest elevation: 0 m (0 ft)
- Population (2023): 1,224
  - Density: 63.82/km^{2} (165.3/sq mi)
- Time zone: UTC+01:00 (CET)
  - Summer (DST): UTC+02:00 (CEST)
- INSEE/Postal code: 2B150 /20260
- ^{1} French Land Register data, which excludes lakes, ponds, glaciers > 1 km^{2} (0.386 sq mi or 247 acres) and river estuaries.

Lumio (French pronunciation: [lumjo]; Corsican: Lumiu) is a commune in the Haute-Corse department of France on the island of Corsica.

== Population ==
Historical population
Year	Pop.	±% p.a.
1968	473	—
1975	732	+6.44%
1982	747	+0.29%
1990	895	+2.29%
1999	1,040	+1.68%
2007	1,110	+0.82%
2012	1,212	+1.77%
2017	1,180	−0.53%
2023	1,224	+0.61%
Source: INSEE

== See also ==
- Communes of the Haute-Corse department
- Torra di Caldanu
- Torra di Spanu
