= General inventory of cultural heritage =

French heritage register

- Inventaire général du patrimoine culturel

Agency overview
- Formed: 1964
- Jurisdiction: Government of France
- Website: http://www.inventaire.culture.gouv.fr/

The General Inventory of Cultural Heritage, known locally as the Inventaire général du patrimoine culturel, is a government body in France that "shall identify, study and publicize heritage of cultural, historical or scientific interest" They have created an Inventory to make a record of all goods based on archival sources created by human kind throughout France. It covers everything from architecture, urban planning, furniture or other objects from the 5th Century to 30 years before the date of the survey.

== History ==
The General Inventory of Cultural Heritage was created in 1964 by André Malraux, who was at the time the Minister of Cultural Affairs. In 2004 the production of the inventory was transferred from central government to the regions, with the State continuing to provide coordination and control. Previously handled by the Architecture and Heritage Department, the management of the Inventory was attached to the Heritage Department of the General Heritage Department from 2010.
