= Conservatoire du littoral =

French environmental public organisation

The Conservatoire du littoral ("Coastal protection agency") (official name: Conservatoire de l'espace littoral et des rivages lacustres) is a French public organisation created in 1975 to ensure the protection of outstanding natural areas on the coast, banks of lakes and stretches of water of 10 square kilometres or more. The Conservatoire is a member of the World Conservation Union.

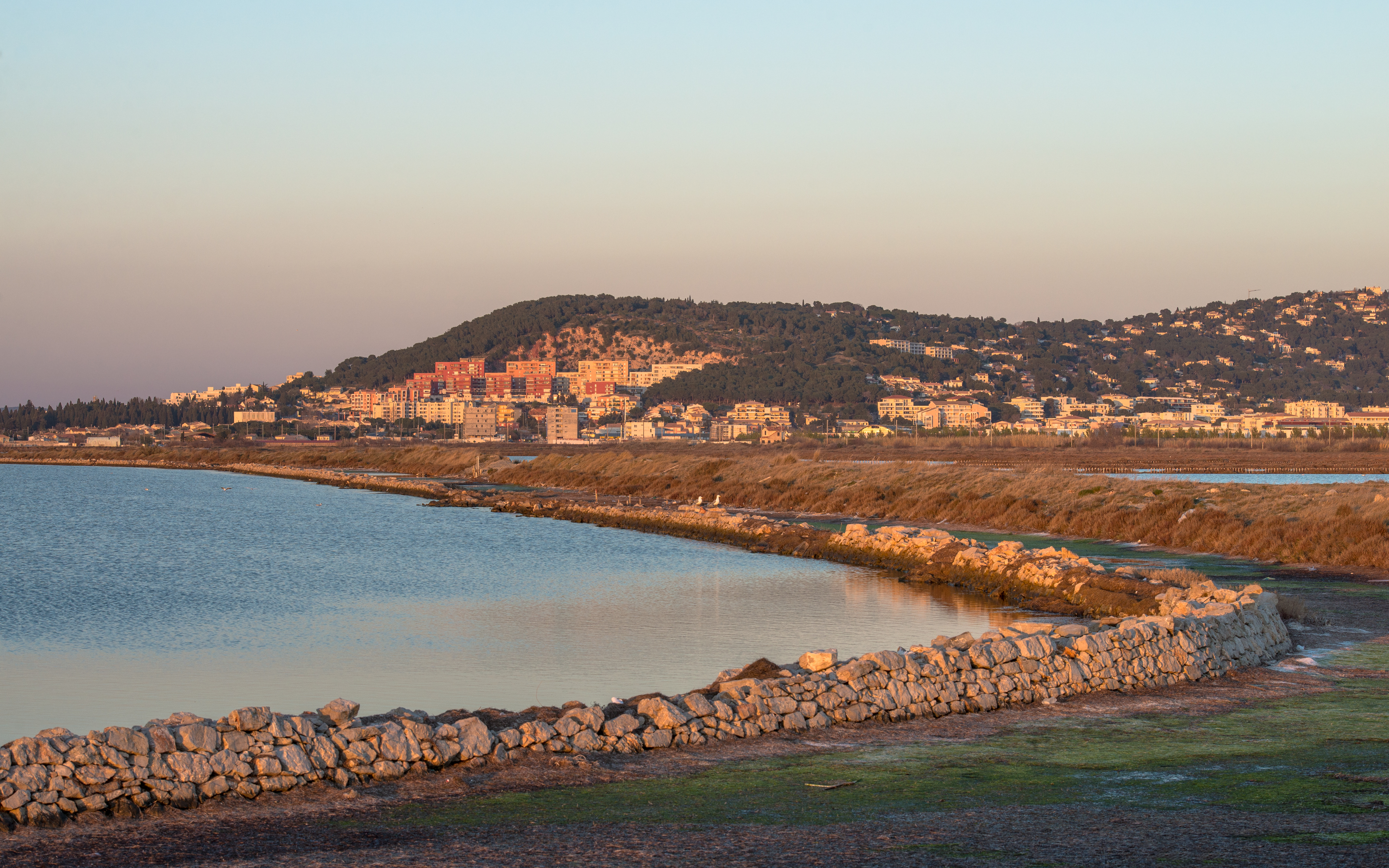
"Lido de Thau" in Sète, Hérault.

Its creation was inspired by the work of the British National Trust, though the National Trust is a private charity, whereas the Conservatoire du littoral is mainly government funded. Its remit covers all French départements, départements d'outre-mer, Mayotte, and, recently, Saint-Pierre and Miquelon.

The Conservatoire acquires land by private agreement, by pre-emption in or, from time to time, by expropriation. Land may also be given to the Conservatoire by donation or legacy. The Conservatoire acquires 20 to 30 km^{2} of land yearly.

After ensuring all the restoration work, the Conservatoire entrusts the management of its lands to local authorities or other local groups or organisations. The Conservatoire uses specialists to decide how the sites should be managed and what activities (such as agricultural or recreational activities) can take place.

As of 31 January 2005, the Conservatoire cared for an area of 732 km^{2} spread over 300 sites, for 861 km of shoreline and 700 sites in 2015 for 1500 km, or 13 percent of French seacoast (the objective is to reach one third in 2050). Its annual budget is approximately €30 million, €25 M of which is earmarked for acquisitions and development. Most of its budget is provided by the national government, but local authorities and the European Union also contribute, as do corporations and private donors. The Conservatoire national du littoral employs 100 people in Rochefort, in Paris, and in its regional offices.

== See also ==
- The National Trust
- Conservatoria delle Coste della Sardegna

== Sources ==
- Bernard Kalaora, Rivages en devenir : de nouveaux horizons pour le Conservatoire du Littoral, 2010, La Documentation Française, 279p ISBN 978-2110079398
- Renaud Bécot, Giacomo Parrinello, « Gouverner le désir de rivage. La fondation du Conservatoire du littoral, 1972-1978 », Le Mouvement Social, n^{o} 271(2), 2020, p. 65-82, doi:10.3917/lms.271.0065
