= List of historical monuments in South Corsica =

This table shows the list of all historical monuments classified or listed in South Corsica.

Monument	Commune	Address	Coordinates	Notice	Protection	Date	Image
Castle of Punta	Alata		41.95667°N 8.70833°E	PA00099072	Inscrit; Classé	1970; 1977	
Funeral Chapel Pozzo di Borgo	Alata		41.959°N 8.7168°E	PA2A000009	Inscrit	2012	
Spin'a Cavaddu Bridge	Arbellara		41.6557°N 8.9811°E	PA00099073	Classé	1976	
Church of St. Nicholas of Aullène	Aullène		41.76902°N 9.07949°E	PA00099129	Inscrit	1990	
Zippitoli Bridge	Bastelica		41.96111°N 9.00222°E	PA00099075	Classé	1977	
Statue of Sampiero Corso	Bastelica		42.00088°N 9.04981°E	PA2A000002	Inscrit	2008	
Menhir of Capo-di-Luogo	Belvédère-Campomoro		41.63472°N 8.83554°E	PA00099074	Classé	1862	
Torra di Campumoru	Belvédère-Campomoro		41.63867°N 8.80692°E	PA00099143	Inscrit	1992	
Prehistoric shelter of Araguina-Sennola	Bonifacio	Sennola	41.39215°N 9.16575°E	PA00099076	Classé	1988	
Roman quarry on the island of Cavallo	Bonifacio	Island Cavaddu and San Bainsu	41.36106°N 9.26045°E	PA00099148	Inscrit	1992	
Genoese Barracks of Bonifacio	Bonifacio	Armes Place	41.38672°N 9.15482°E	PA00132599	Inscrit	1994	
Chapel of the Trinity	Bonifacio		41.405666°N 9.123759°E	PA2A000015	Inscrit	2016	
Cemeteries and pyramid of the Sémillante	Bonifacio	Lavezzi archipelago	41.34°N 9.255°E	PA00099080	Classé	1983	
Citadel of Bonifacio	Bonifacio		41.38778°N 9.15946°E	PA00099077	Inscrit	1929	
Convent of St. Dominique of Bonifacio	Bonifacio		41.387°N 9.15569°E	PA00099130	Inscrit	1990	
Convent of St.François of Bonifacio	Bonifacio		41.38624°N 9.15025°E	PA00099078	Inscrit; Classé	1976; 1976	
Convent of St.Julien in Bonifacio	Bonifacio		41.3890465°N 9.1831139°E	PA00099079	Inscrit	1974	
St. Barthélemy Church of Bonifacio	Bonifacio	Saint-Barthélemy	41.38708°N 9.15318°E	PA00132596	Inscrit	1994	
St. Dominic's Church of Bonifacio	Bonifacio		41.387°N 9.15568°E	PA00099081	Classé	1862	
Church of St. Mary Magdalene Bonifacio	Bonifacio		41.38743°N 9.15383°E	PA00132598	Inscrit	1994	
Church of St. Mary Major of Bonifacio	Bonifacio		41.38715°N 9.15902°E	PA00099082	Classé	1982	
Church of St. James of Bonifacio	Bonifacio		41.3869°N 9.15658°E	PA00132597	Inscrit	1994	
Staircase of King of Aragon	Bonifacio		41.38621°N 9.15559°E	PA00132600	Inscrit	1994	
House	Bonifacio	4 rue des Deux Empereurs	41.387378°N 9.159832°E	PA00099084	Inscrit	1927	
House of Charles Quint	Bonifacio	12 rue Saint-Dominique	41.3869°N 9.1576°E	PA00099085	Inscrit	1935	
Doria House	Bonifacio	28 rue Doria	41.3868°N 9.1591°E	PA00099083	Inscrit	1935	
Well St.Barthélemy	Bonifacio	Bois du Cavo	41.38662°N 9.1534°E	PA00132601	Inscrit	1994	
Archaeological site of Piantarella	Bonifacio		41.37148°N 9.22185°E	PA00099086	Classé	2007	
Saint John's Church of Carbini	Carbini		41.67957°N 9.14743°E	PA00099087	Classé	1886	
Church of the Assumption of Cargèse	Cargèse		42.13362°N 8.59623°E	PA00099089	Inscrit	1989	
Saint-Spyridon Church of Cargèse	Cargèse		42.13356°N 8.59509°E	PA00099088	Classé	1990	
Torra d'Omigna	Cargèse		42.14648°N 8.55993°E	PA00099136	Inscrit	1991	
Orangery of Portiglio	Coti-Chiavari		41.793326°N 8.745345°E	PA2A000016	Inscrit	2016	
Torra di Capu di Muru	Coti-Chiavari	Capo di Muro	41.7498°N 8.67651°E	PA00132603	Inscrit	1994	
Torra di Capu Neru	Coti-Chiavari	Punta di Capu Neru	41.72536°N 8.70934°E	PA00132602	Inscrit	1994	
Zaglia Bridge	Évisa		42.25013°N 8.77614°E	PA00099090	Classé	1990	
St. John the Baptist Chapel in Pruno	Figari	Pruno	41.534472°N 9.149139°E	PA00099091	Classé	1977	
San Quilico Chapel of Montilati	Figari		41.51517°N 9.16149°E	PA00099092	Classé	1977	
San'Petru di Panicala Chapel	Forciolo		41.85475°N 8.99597°E	PA2A000006	Inscrit	2009; 2010	
Tower di Colomba	Fozzano		41.69767°N 9.00087°E	PA00099093	Inscrit	1952	
Church of San Giovanni de Grossa	Grossa		41.61354°N 8.89247°E	PA00099094	Classé	1977	
Menhir of Vaccil Vecchiu	Grossa		41.59378°N 8.87634°E	PA00099095	Classé	1862	
Archaeological site of Castiglione	Grosseto-Prugna	Castiglione	41.8873°N 8.82166°E	PA00099096	Inscrit	1987	
Torra di Capiteddu	Grosseto-Prugna		41.9043°N 8.79909°E	PA00099137	Inscrit	1991	
Torra di San Ciprianu	Lecci		41.62679°N 9.34595°E	PA00135315	Inscrit	1995	
Archaeological site of Capula	Levie		41.72207°N 9.13218°E	PA00099131	Classé	1990	
Archaeological site of Cucuruzzu	Levie	Murato	41.72461°N 9.12682°E	PA00099097	Classé	1982	
Abbadia Santa Maria Assunta of Cruscaglia	Moca-Croce		41.80775°N 9.00038°E	PA00099098	Inscrit	1926	
Castello di Cuntorba	Olmeto		41.70454°N 8.85861°E	PA2A000007	Inscrit	2010	
Convent of Saint Saint-Antoine of Olmeto	Olmeto		41.72388°N 8.92143°E	PA00099138	Inscrit	1991	
Fortin of Girolata	Osani	Girolata	42.34769°N 8.61283°E	PA2A000003	Classé	2013	
Pianella Bridge	Ota		42.25627°N 8.76104°E	PA00099099	Classé	1976	
Torra di Portu	Ota		42.26782°N 8.69177°E	PA00099100	Inscrit	1946	
Convent of St. Francis of Istria	Petreto-Bicchisano		41.78722°N 8.98074°E	PA00125387	Inscrit	1993	
Abra Bridge	Petreto-Bicchisano	Taravo	41.81°N 8.9597°E	PA00099101	Classé	1976	
Hotel Les Roches Rouges	Piana		42.24015°N 8.64164°E	PA00099139	Inscrit	1991	
Archaeological site of San Giovanni	Pianottoli-Caldarello		41.46203°N 9.051°E	PA00132838	Inscrit	1994	
Torra di Caldarellu	Pianottoli-Caldarello		41.46486°N 9.05795°E	PA00135316	Inscrit	1995	
Torra di l'Isuledda	Pietrosella		41.84436°N 8.7546°E	PA00099144	Inscrit	1992	
Guardienna Mill	Porto-Vecchio		41.57919°N 9.24799°E	PA00099103	Inscrit	1987	
Chapel of St. Marie of Quenza	Quenza	Sortie du village	41.76295°N 9.13465°E	PA00099104	Classé	1976	
Church of St. George of Quenza	Quenza		41.76544°N 9.13808°E	PA00099105	Classé; Inscrit	1979; 1989	
Convent of St. Francis of St. Lucia-of-Tallano	Sainte-Lucie-de-Tallano		41.69516°N 9.066°E	PA00099106	Classé	1980	
Saint Jean Church of Saint Lucia of Tallano	Sainte-Lucie-de-Tallano		41.70467°N 9.05318°E	PA00099102	Classé	1930	
House Giacomoni	Sainte-Lucie-de-Tallano		41.69718°N 9.06278°E	PA00099107	Inscrit	1987	
Araghju	San-Gavino-di-Carbini	Castelluccio	41.64787°N 9.26212°E	PA00099109	Classé	1974	
Santa Maria Assunta Church of Santa Maria Figaniella	Santa-Maria-Figaniella		41.70621°N 9.00301°E	PA00099110	Classé	1927	
Saint Lucia Chapel of Santa Maria Siché	Santa-Maria-Siché		41.87485°N 8.97667°E	PA00099108	Inscrit	1989	
Castle of Vico d'Ornano	Santa-Maria-Siché	Vico	41.8729°N 8.9818°E	PA2A000010	Inscrit	2012	
Palazzu of Sampiero Corso	Santa-Maria-Siché	Vico	41.8733°N 8.9811°E	PA2A000011	Inscrit	2012	
Church of St. Jean of Cinarca	Sari-d'Orcino		42.06158°N 8.80134°E	PA00099111	Classé	1976	
Alignments of Renaghju and I Stantari	Sartène	Scaglio	41.53029°N 8.92171°E	PA00099112	Classé	1975	
Dolmen of Funtanaccia	Sartène	Stazzona and Fontanaccia	41.52946°N 8.91817°E	PA00099114	Classé	1889	
Echauguette of Sartène	Sartène	Avenue Gabriel-Péri	41.62077°N 8.97122°E	PA00099115	Inscrit	1984	
Church of St. Mary of Sartene	Sartène	Place de la Libération	41.62123°N 8.97221°E	PA00099116	Inscrit	1985	
Fortin of Tizzano	Sartène		41.54226°N 8.84679°E	PA00099117	Inscrit	1985	
u Frate e a Sora	Sartène	Ufrate e A Sora	41.64682°N 8.94767°E	PA00099113	Classé	1889	
Sartène Town Hall	Sartène		41.62106°N 8.97194°E	PA00099140	Inscrit	1991	
House Charles de Rocca Serra	Sartène		41.620146°N 8.971925°E	PA2A000013	Inscrit	2014	
House Philippe de Rocca Serra	Sartène		41.621488°N 8.973078°E	PA2A000014	Inscrit	2014	
Palaghju	Sartène	Pagliajo	41.55712°N 8.88679°E	PA00099118	Classé	1974	
Spina-Cavallu Bridge	Sartène		41.6557°N 8.9811°E	PA00099119	Classé	1976	
St. Jean d'Ortolo	Sartène		41.5785°N 9.02669°E	PA2A000005	Inscrit	2009	
Torra di Roccapina	Sartène		41.49556°N 8.92889°E	PA00132604	Inscrit	1994	
Torra di Senetosa	Sartène		41.56427°N 8.79866°E	PA00099145	Inscrit	1992	
e Calanche	Sollacaro		41.73289°N 8.85161°E	PA00099132	Classé	1990	
Church of St. Albert of Calvese	Sollacaro		41.7467°N 8.9096°E	PA2A000012	Inscrit	2012	
Filitosa	Sollacaro		41.74722°N 8.87139°E	PA00099120	Classé; Classé	1967; 1980	
Chapel of San Agostino de Chera	Sotta		41.5007°N 9.19018°E	PA00099121	Classé	1980	
Menhir statue of Tavera	Tavera		42.0692°N 8.9868°E	PA2A000008	Classé	2011	
Fort house of Urbalacone	Urbalacone		41.83602°N 8.94895°E	PA2A000001	Inscrit	2007	
Sant'Appiano Cathedral of Sagone	Vico		42.1184°N 8.69021°E	PA00099133	Inscrit	1989	
Menhir statue of Appriciani	Vico	Voie principale	42.1185°N 8.69°E	PA00099122	Classé	1840	
Torra di Sagone	Vico		42.11055°N 8.68656°E	PA00099123	Inscrit	1974	
Arca of Zévaco	Zévaco		41.89068°N 9.0488°E	PA00099124	Classé	1981	
Church of Zigliara	Zigliara		41.84632°N 8.99514°E	PA00099125	Inscrit	1981	
Abra Bridge	Zigliara		41.81°N 8.9597°E	PA00099126	Classé	1976	
Torra di Fautea	Zonza	Fautea	41.71348°N 9.4057°E	PA00099146	Inscrit	1992	
Torra di Pinareddu	Zonza	Island of Pinarellu	41.67065°N 9.39265°E	PA00099147	Inscrit	1992	

== See also ==
- List of historical monuments of Ajaccio
- List of historical monuments of Bastia
- Monument historique
