= 2022 Corsica unrest =

Violent clashes in France

- Part of Corsican conflict
- Date: 9 March – 10 April 2022 (1 month and 1 day)
- Location: Corsica
- Caused by: Beating and death of Corsican nationalist Yvan Colonna in prison by a Cameroonian inmate for "disrespecting Muhammad"
- Methods: Protests, rioting, arson

Parties
(Corsica) Corsican nationalists	France: National Gendarmerie; Municipal Police

Casualties and losses
25 injured	77 injured

Casualties
- Death: 0

In March 2022, the island of Corsica, France, saw protests in response to a prison attack on nationalist leader Yvan Colonna. There were rallies in the main cities of Ajaccio, Calvi and Bastia that descended into violent clashes between police and protestors. Protestors threw stones and flares at gendarmes.

== Background ==
Yvan Colonna was a Corsican nationalist who was arrested in 2003 for the 1998 murder of Corsican prefect Claude Érignac. Colonna was a hero among many Corsicans, and has become a symbol of Corsican nationalism. On 2 March 2022, an inmate started beating Colonna in his prison cell. The beating seriously injured him, and left him in a coma. His attack sparked a series of riots in Corsica. Colonna died at hospital of his wounds on 21 March 2022, at the age of 61, three weeks after being attacked.

== Events ==
On 9 March, windows were smashed and the courthouse of Ajaccio was set on fire. A bank was also damaged with a hijacked mini excavator. On 10 March, many projectiles were thrown at police outside a Calvi government building. The same night cars were set on fire in downtown Ajaccio.

Rioting flared up again on 13 March, when 7,000–12,000 protesters marched in the streets in defence of Colonna. The protests spiralled into riots, and police officers sprayed demonstrators with tear gas and water cannon as rioting continued. Rioters in Bastia attacked numerous infrastructure, including the local post office and a tax office. Police officers said that 67 people had been injured in total; 44 of them were members of the police. The number was later revised to 102 injuries in total with 77 police injuries.

The National Liberation Front of Corsica announced on 16 March that they supported the demonstrators and that a last straw would result in an insurrection that could renew their militant campaign against the French government.

On 21 March, Colonna died of his injuries. While protests erupted, the demonstrations were more peaceful and no riots occurred. Tensions continued and French authorities put Corsica on "maximum riot alert".

On 28 March, a rally was held in front of riot police barracks near Bastia.

On 7 April 2022, two villas in Canale-di-Verde and Ghisonaccia were set on fire. Investigators found a tag in the Canale-di-Verde house written with the words "For Yvan."

A few days later, a villa in Chevano, Pianottoli-Caldarello was destroyed. The walls were vandalized with phrases such as "Per tè Yvan," "IFF (I Francesi Fora)" and "Fora a Francia!!!" Additional messages on the building showed that the attack was claimed by a group named the Action des jeunes pour la renaissance de la Corse or AJRC. A house in Conca was burned the next day with similar messages found on the scene.

== Response ==
President of the Executive Council of Corsica Gilles Simeoni said that the attack on Colonna was an assassination attempt, and called for the Castex government to respond. Due to the unrest affecting the upcoming campaign for the presidential election and parliamentary election, the French government is reportedly considering giving autonomy to Corsica.

On 21 March, there were demonstrations of solidarity by exponents of Sardinian independence at the French consulate of Sassari.
