= Azilone-Ampaza =

Commune in Corsica, France

- Commune
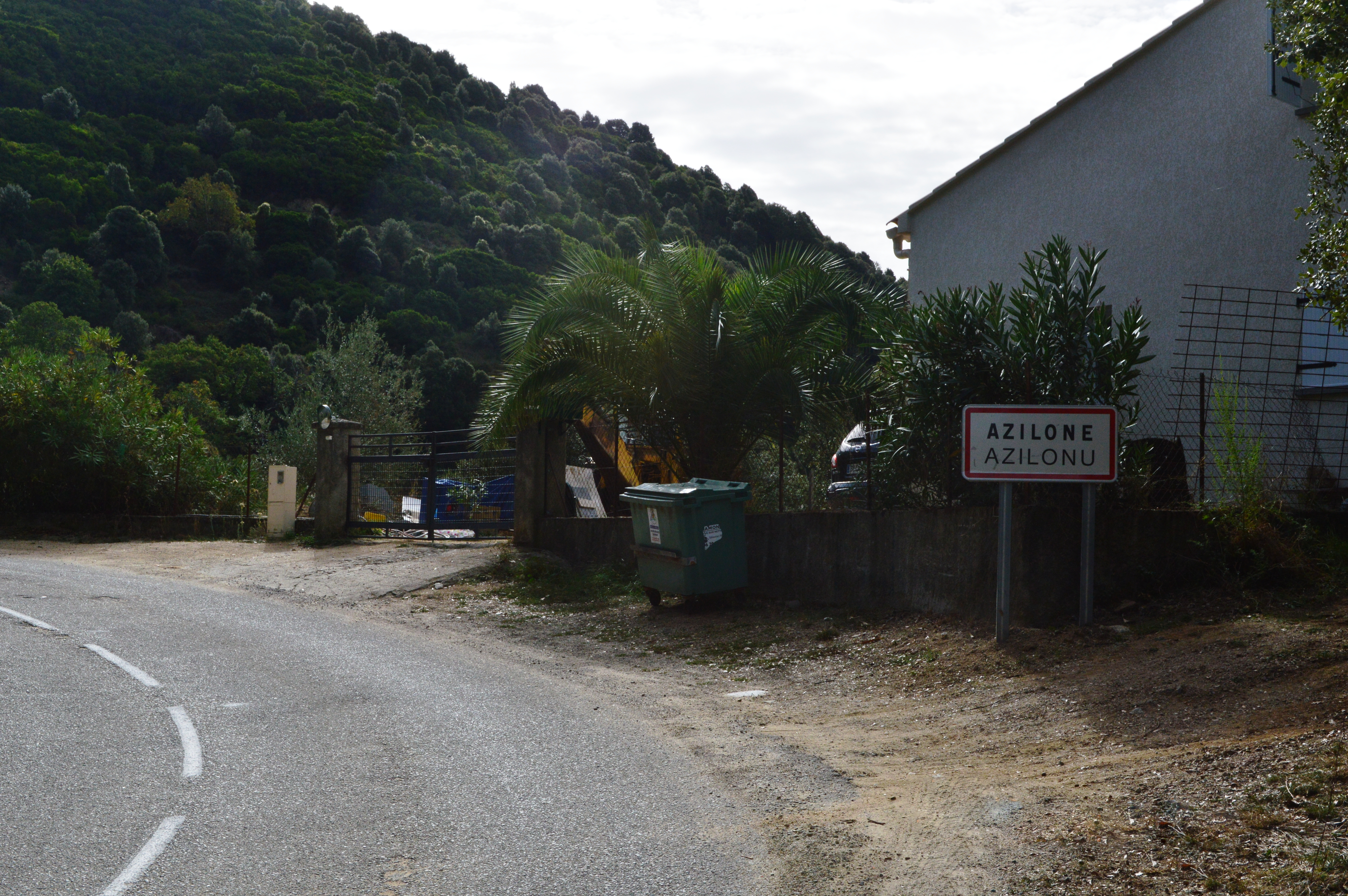
- The road into Azilone-Ampaza
- Location of Azilone-Ampaza
- Location within France Location within Corsica
- Coordinates: 41°51′54″N 9°00′53″E
- Country: France
- Region: Corsica
- Department: Corse-du-Sud
- Arrondissement: Ajaccio
- Canton: Taravo-Ornano
- Intercommunality: CC de la Pieve de l'Ornano et du Taravo

Government
  - Mayor (2020–2026): Marie Chiarisoli
- Area^{1}: 7.96 km^{2} (3.07 sq mi)
- Elevation: 420 m (1,380 ft)
- Highest elevation: 909 m (2,982 ft)
- Lowest elevation: 354 m (1,161 ft)
- Population (2023): 208
  - Density: 26.1/km^{2} (67.7/sq mi)
- Time zone: UTC+01:00 (CET)
  - Summer (DST): UTC+02:00 (CEST)
- INSEE/Postal code: 2A026 /20190
- ^{1} French Land Register data, which excludes lakes, ponds, glaciers > 1 km^{2} (0.386 sq mi or 247 acres) and river estuaries.

Azilone-Ampaza (Italian pronunciation: [attsiˈloːne ˈampattsa]; Corsican: Azilonu è Àmpaza, pronounced [atsiˈlonu ɛ ˈampatsa]) is a commune in the Corse-du-Sud department of France on the island of Corsica.

== Geography ==
Azilone-Ampaza is located in the Panicale Valley in the Middle Taravo region some 22 km east by south-east of Ajaccio and 4 km east of Grosseto-Prugna. The D83 road from Santa-Maria-Siché to Zévaco passes through the northern tip of the commune but has no connection to the village. Access to the village is by road D26 from Olivese in the south-east which enters the commune from the south, passing through the village, then loops south again to join the Route nationale N196 south-west of the commune. Apart from the main village there are the hamlets of Ampaza in the north-west and Azilone south of the village. The commune is rugged and heavily forested.

== History ==
Both villages originated from the hamlet of Calcinaghju which was in the middle of the valley and destroyed by the Moors. Under the Paolinu and Genovese administrative systems, the commune belonged to the Pieve of Ornano. The town is now mainly known for being a high point on the Tour de Corse, an event that counts for the World Rally Championship (WRC).

== Administration ==
List of Successive Mayors

From	To	Name	Party
2001	2020	Antoine Peretti	DVG
2020	2026	Marie Chiarisoli	

== Population ==
Historical population

Year	Pop.	±% p.a.
1800	329	—
1821	302	−0.41%
1846	422	+1.35%
1872	388	−0.32%
1901	488	+0.79%
1926	510	+0.18%
1946	311	−2.44%
1962	211	−2.40%
1968	178	−2.79%

Year	Pop.	±% p.a.
1975	129	−4.50%
1982	101	−3.44%
1990	77	−3.33%
1999	93	+2.12%
2007	133	+4.57%
2012	156	+3.24%
2017	184	+3.36%
2023	208	+2.06%

Source: EHESS and INSEE

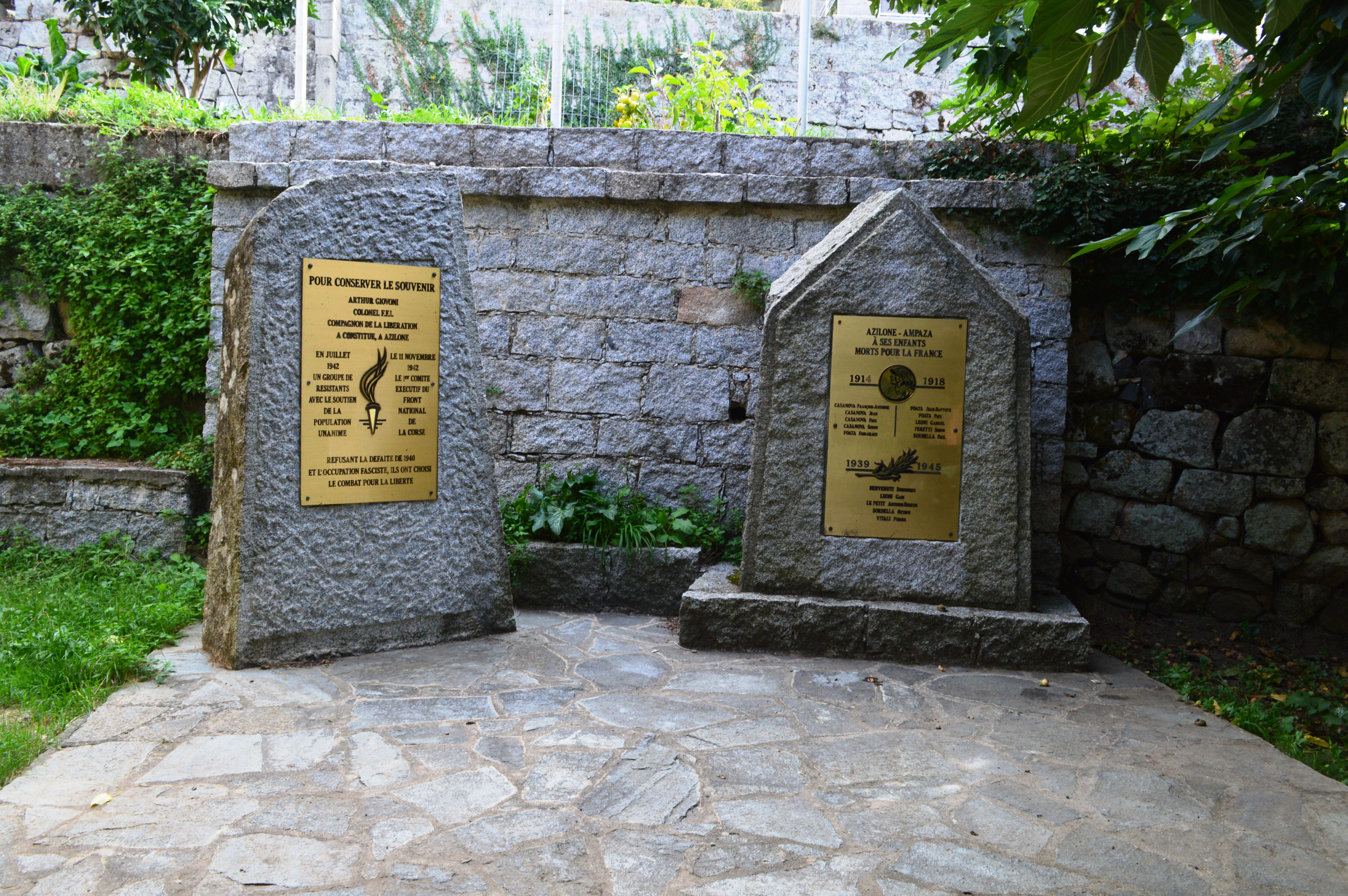
Azilone-Ampaza War Memorial

== Culture and heritage ==
=== Religious heritage ===
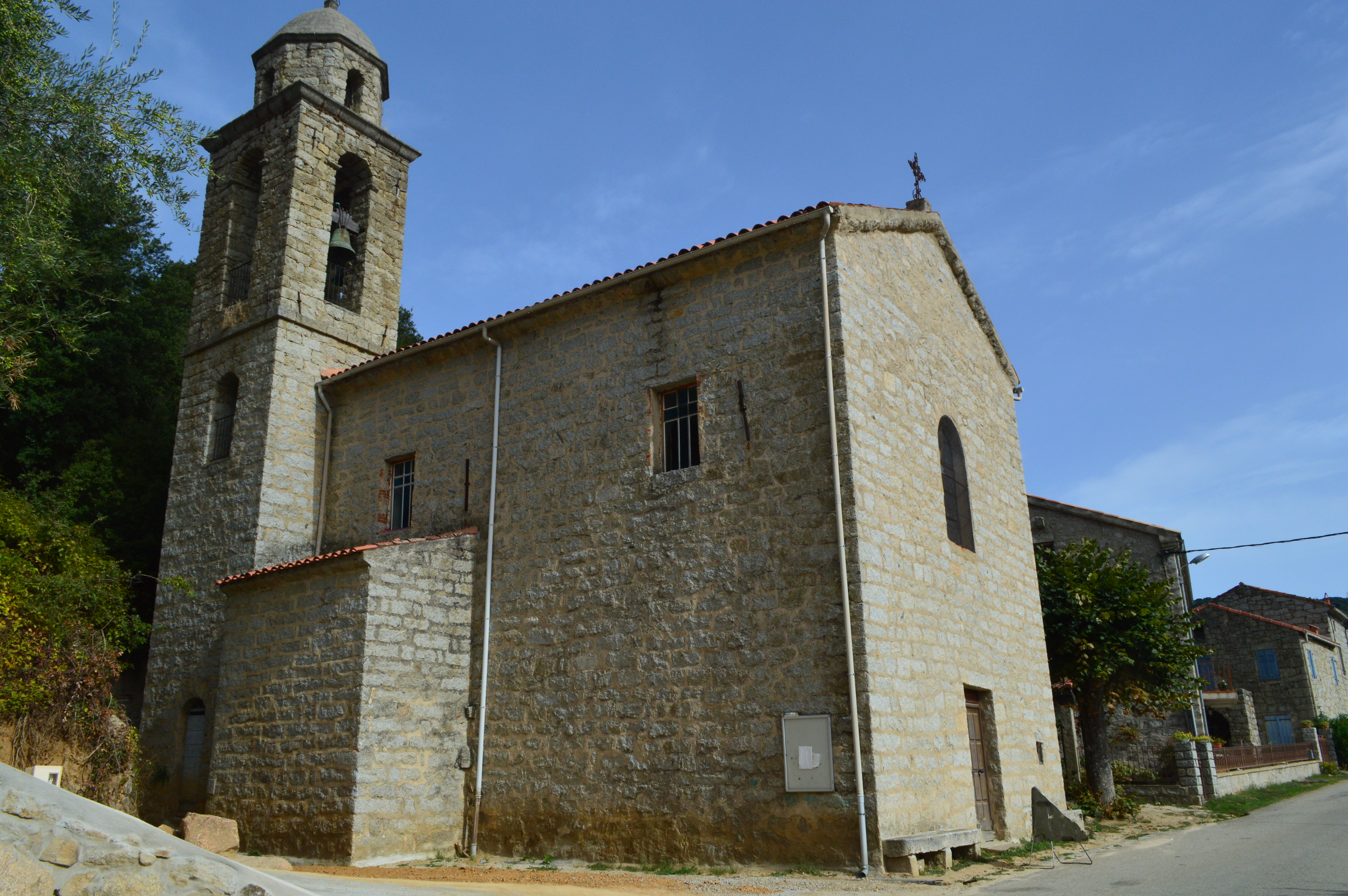
The Chapel of Saint-Saveur d'Ampaza

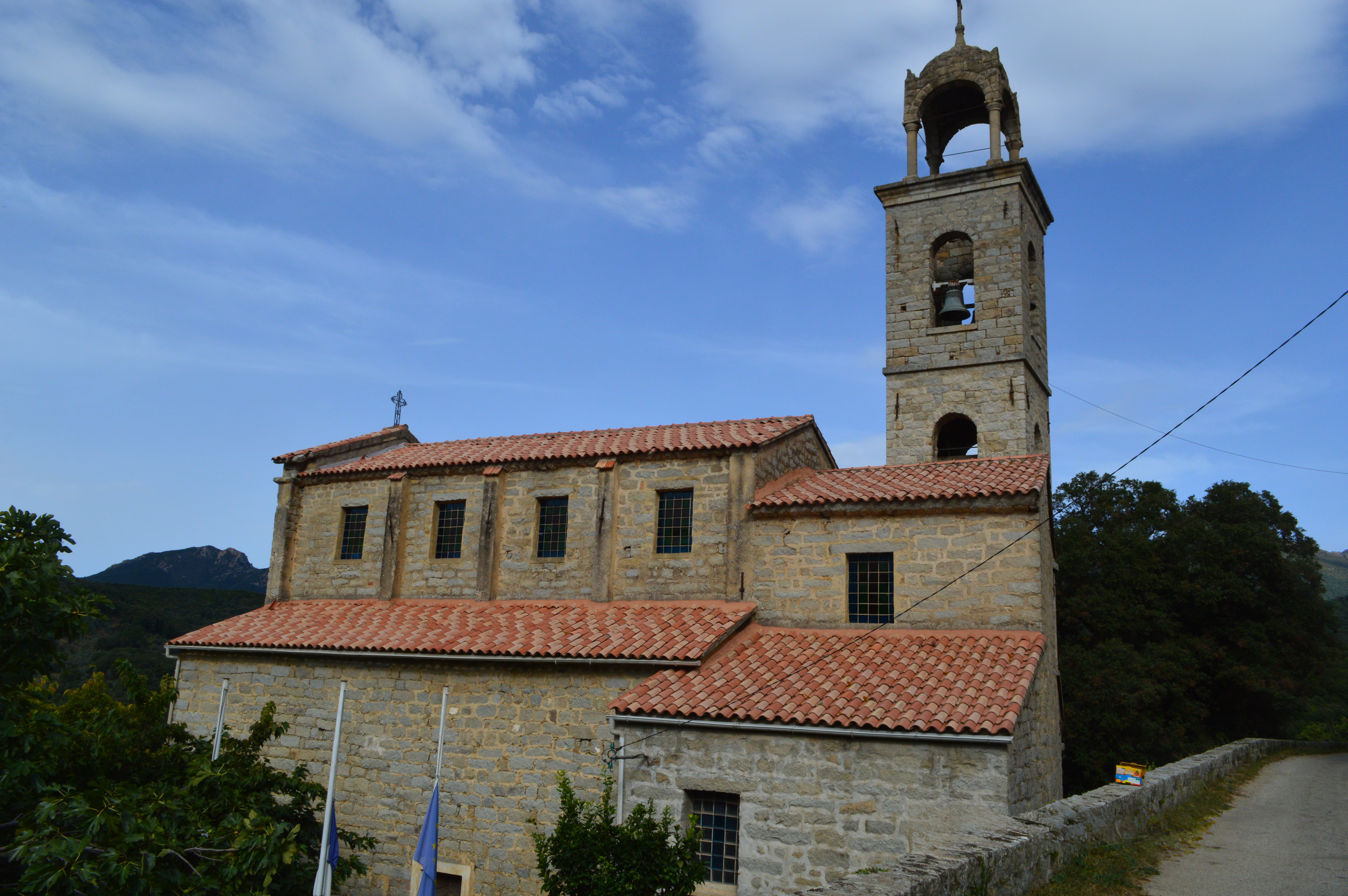
The Parish Church of Sainte-Marie at Azilone

- The Chapel of Saint-Saveur d'Ampaza contains a Tabernacle (16th century) which is registered as an historical object.
- The Parish Church of Sainte-Marie contains a Monstrance (19th century) which is registered as an historical object.

=== Azilone-Ampaza Photo Gallery ===
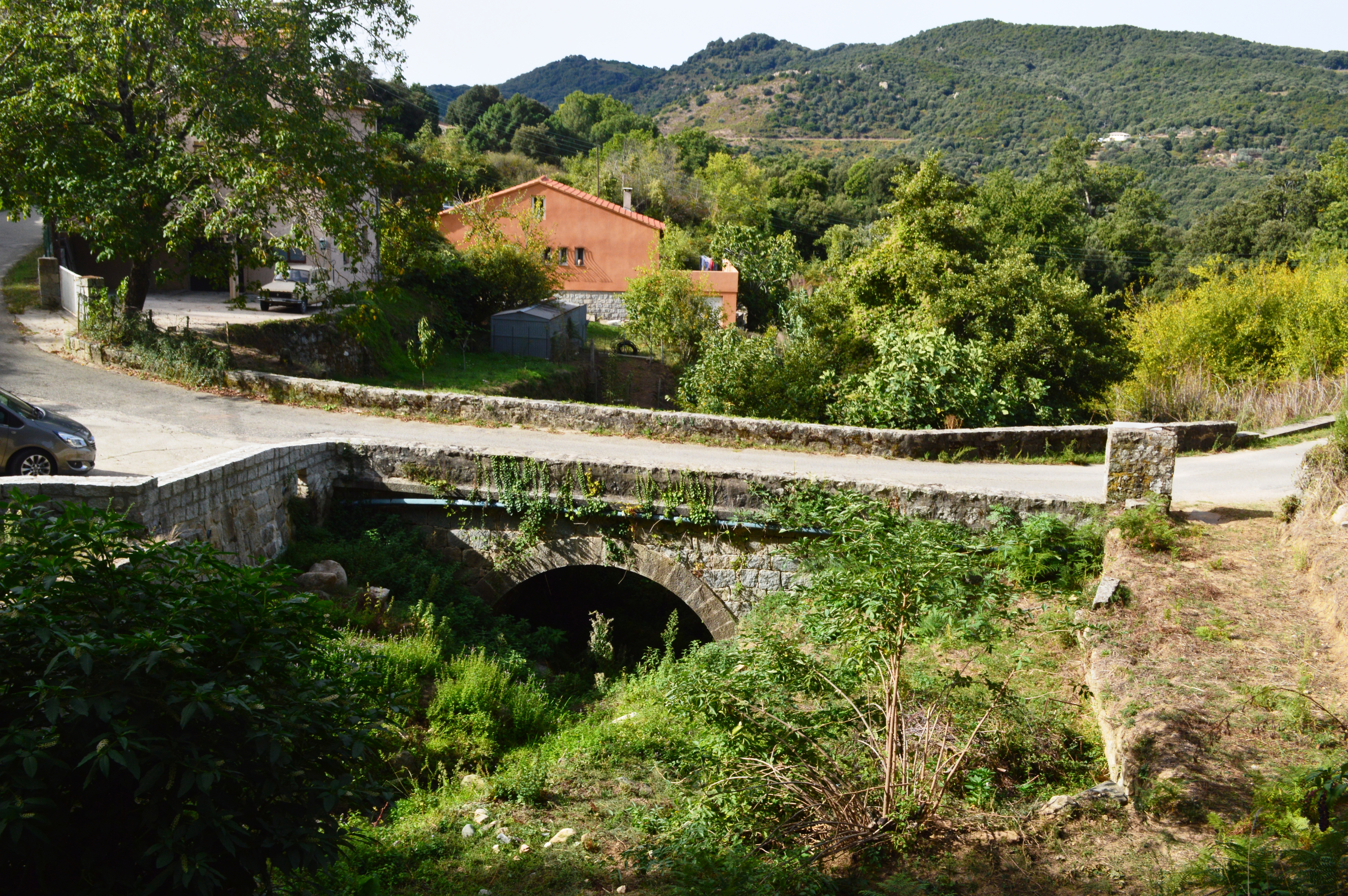
The bridge from Azilone to Ampaza

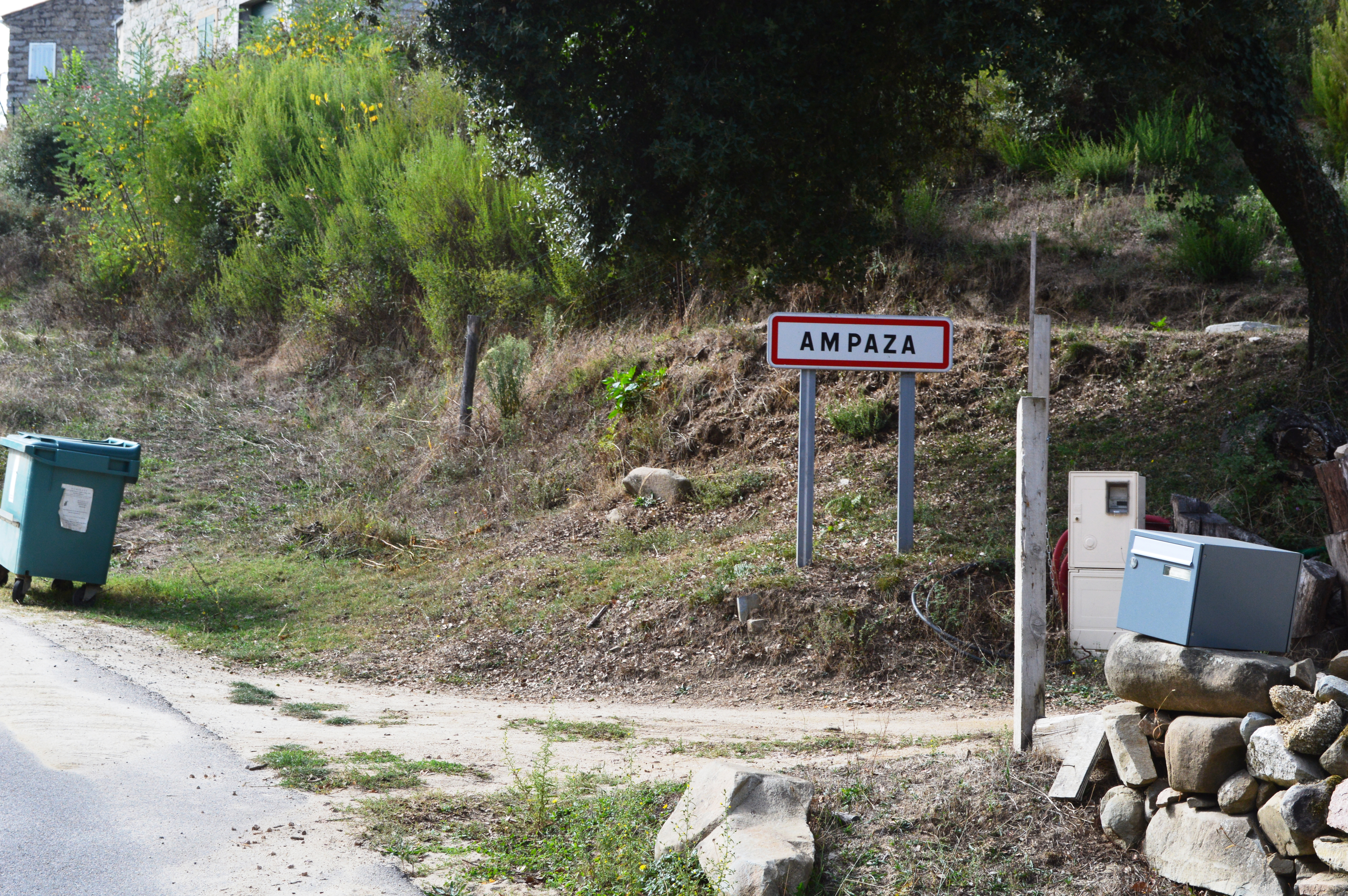
The entry to Ampaza

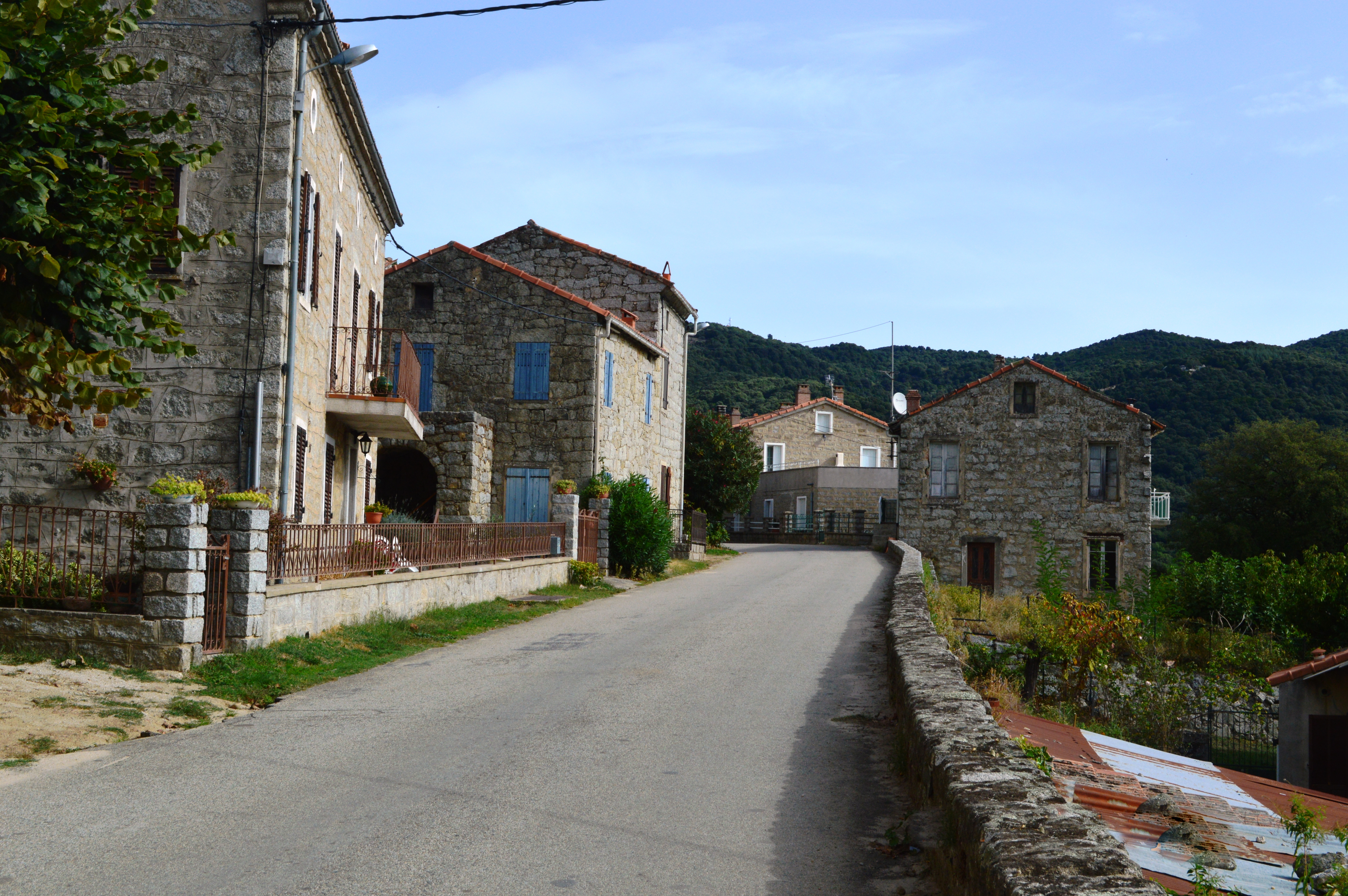
A street in Ampaza

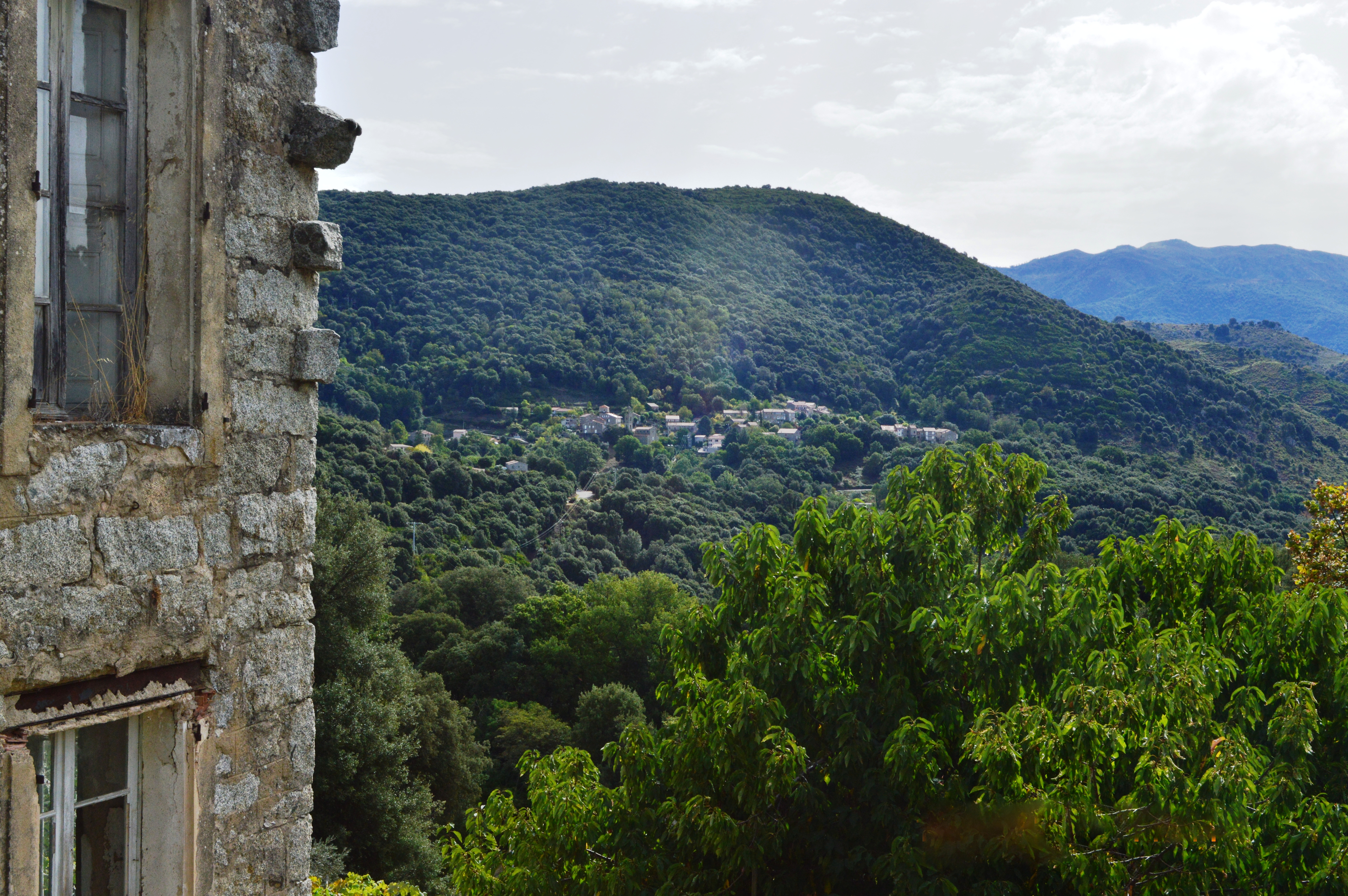
View of Azilone from Ampaza

== Notable people linked to the commune ==
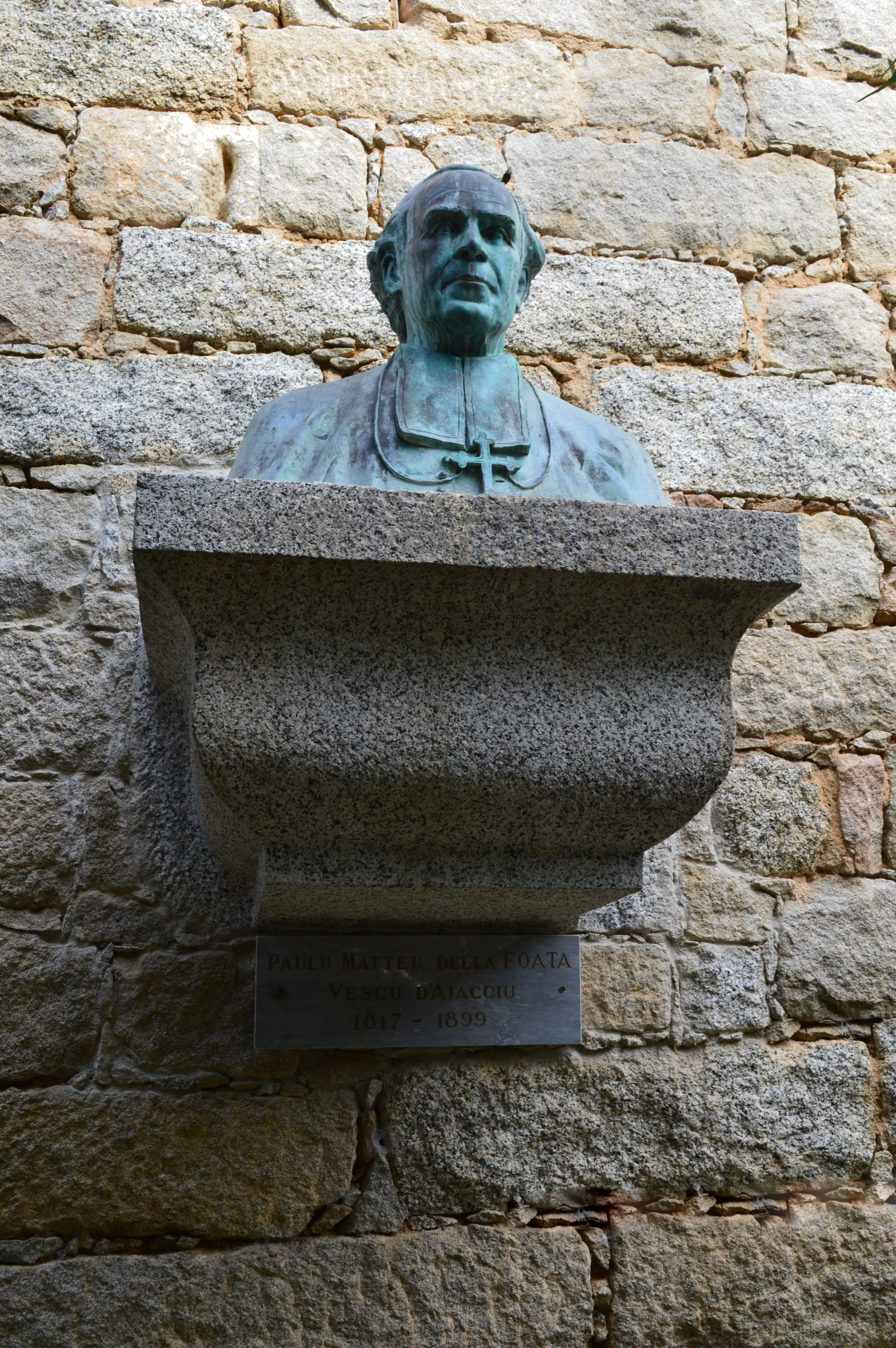
A Statue of Monseigneur Paul Mathieu de la Foata in Azilone

- Monseigneur Paul Mathieu de la Foata (1817-1899), Bishop of Ajaccio and author of Poesie giocose
- Arthur Giovoni (1909-1996), resistance fighter from the beginning of the war, communist MP, Companion of the Liberation
- Eliane Eva Vincileoni (1930-1989), militant libertarian, niece of Arthur Giovoni, coordinator of the anti-Franco struggle in Catalonia, founder of the group Materialismo e Libertad in Milan, Italy.

== See also ==
- Communes of the Corse-du-Sud department
