= Gabriel de Lantivy de Kerveno =

French soldier, administrator and diplomat (1792–1866)

- Born: Château du Bot, Quimerc'h, Brittany, France
- Died: Le Hohwald, Bas-Rhin, France
- Occupations: Soldier, administrator and diplomat
- Known for: First French consul in Jerusalem

Gabriel Marie Jean Benoit de Lantivy de Kerveno (24 March 1792 – 27 May 1866) was a French soldier, administrator and diplomat.

== Early years ==
Gabriel de Lantivy de Kerveno was born in Château du Bot, Quimerch, Pont-de-Buis-lès-Quimerch, Finistère, on 24 March 1792. His parents were Jacques Louis Alexandre de Lantivy de Kerveno and Félicité Conen de Saint-Luc (1764–1804). He was appointed page to the Emperor Napoleon on 18 October 1807. He became a lieutenant of the 1st regiment of Chasseurs à Cheval de la Garde Impériale on 20 July 1810. He campaigned in Germany in 1810 and 1811, and in the French invasion of Russia in 1812. He was distinguished at Krasnoe on 14 August 1812 where he took a cannon. He was a member of the Escadron sacré (Sacred Squadron) that protected the Emperor during the final retreat. Part of his right foot was amputated after being frozen, and he left the army.

Gabriel de Lantivy was sub-prefect of Montmorillon from 20 May 1813 to 31 January 1819. In 1815 he married Marie le Feuvre de la Faluère (c. 1795–1834). They had one child, Ester de Lantivy de Kerveno (1822–80). Gabriel de Lantivy was made a knight of the Order of Saint Louis on 29 February 1816. He was appointed sub-prefect of Châtillon-sur-Seine (from 28 March 1822), of Chalon-sur-Saône (from 8 January 1823) and of Le Havre (from 5 February 1823).

== Prefect ==
Comte Gabriel de Lantivy de Kerveno was appointed prefect of the department of Corsica on 29 June 1824, succeeding Vicomte Antoine Louis Ange Elysée de Suleau. The Palais Lantivy, the administrative seat of the prefecture, was authorized by a royal ordinance dated 25 September 1822, and is named after Gabriel de Lantivy. He laid the first stone on 2 July 1826. (Note: The Palais Lantivy was completed in 1830, but was not occupied by the prefect until 15 September 1837, when Honoré Jourdan du Var took possession.) He was succeeded on 3 March 1828 by Joseph Jérôme Hilaire Angellier. He was prefect of Basses-Alpes (from 3 March 1828). He was named Maître des requêtes at the Council of State on 1 November 1826, and served from 12 November 1828 to 20 August 1830. He was prefect of Lot (20 April – 19 August 1830).

== Consul ==
De Lantivy was the first French consul in Jerusalem, where he served in 1843–44. He was present at a time when the European powers were competing for influence. He reported to his minister that "The Anglicans are striving to attract the Jews of Jerusalem, as they already have the Druze in Lebanon, so as to cut this population off from the influence of French patronage." He noted that the Anglicans had set up a well-equipped hospital and pharmacy, and had brought in a physician and an architect. He wrote, "I consider it urgent to establish two Catholic institution in Jerusalem—that will obviously be French as well—so as to balance the opposing influences of the Anglicans and the Greco-Russians.

De Lantivy was later appointed Consul General of France in Bremen (1846) and in Dublin, Ireland (1852). He was made a knight and then an officer of the Legion of Honour, a grand officer of the Ordre équestre du Saint-Sépulcre de Jérusalem, and was awarded the Saint Helena Medal. He died in Le Hohwald, Barr, Bas-Rhin on 27 May 1866.

== Sources ==
- Alain Garric (2015). "Gabriel DE LANTIVY DE KERVENO". Geneanet (in French).
- Benvenisti, Meron (1996-11-08). City of Stone: The Hidden History of Jerusalem. University of California Press. p. 19. ISBN 978-0-520-91868-9.
- "Gabriel Marie Jean Benoît de Lantivy de Kervéno (1792-1866)". BnF (in French).
- "La liste des Préfets de Corse depuis l'an 1800" (in French). Services de l’Etat en Corse du Sud. 20 May 2010.
- "Le Palais Lantivy, siège de la préfecture de Corse" (in French). Services de l’Etat en Corse du Sud. 5 May 2010.
- Théodore Courtaux (1899). Histoire généalogique de la maison de Lantivy, de ses alliances et des seigneuries qu'elle a possédées, Bretagne, Maine, Anjou et Languedoc, suivie des généalogies des maisons de l'Estourbeillon (Bretagne) et de Richemont de Richard'son (Écosse et France)... par Théodore Courtaux et le Cte de Lantivy de Trédion (in French). Paris: cabinet de "l'Historiographe".
