= Tour de San Benedettu =

Genoese coastal defence tower in Corsica

Tower of San Benedettu
- Torra di San Benedettu (Corsican)
- Location within Corsica
- 41°37′3″N 9°19′4″E

History
- Built: Second half 16th century

The Tower of San Benedettu (Corsican: Torra di San Benedettu) or Tower of Cala Rossa was a Genoese tower located in the commune of Lecci on the east coast of Corsica. The tower sat on the Punta di Benedettu at the north side of the Golfe de Porto-Vecchio. Only a few traces survive.

The tower was built in the second half of the 16th century. It was one of a series of coastal defences constructed by the Republic of Genoa between 1530 and 1620 to stem the attacks by Barbary pirates.

== See also ==
- List of Genoese towers in Corsica
