= Jean-Hugues Colonna =

French politician (1934–2026)

Member of the National Assembly
- In office 2 April 1986 – 14 May 1988
- Succeeded by: Christian Estrosi
- Constituency: Alpes-Maritimes at large
- In office 2 July 1981 – 1 April 1986
- Preceded by: Fernand Icart
- Constituency: Alpes-Maritimes's 3rd constituency

Personal details
- Born: Jean-Hugues Dieudonné Colonna; 31 May 1934 Cargèse, Corsica, France
- Died: 14 January 2026 (aged 91) Cargèse, Corsica, France
- Party: Socialist Party
- Spouse: Cécile Riou (m. 1957; died 2025)
- Children: 3, including Yvan
- Occupation: Physical education teacher
- Awards: Legion of Honour (1998)

Jean-Hugues Dieudonné Colonna (31 May 1934 – 14 January 2026) was a French Socialist Party politician.

== Life and career ==
Born in Cargèse in Corse-du-Sud, Colonna was transferred to Nice in 1975 as a teacher of physical education. He served in the National Assembly representing Alpes-Maritimes's 3rd constituency (1981–1986) and Alpes-Maritimes at large (1986–1988). While in the Assembly, he was an advisor on Corsican affairs for Gaston Defferre, the Minister of the Interior. In 1988, he was defeated in the run-off for the 5th constituency of the department by Christian Estrosi. He was made a Chevalier of the Legion of Honour in April 1998 for "34 years of civil and military service, trade union activities and elected public service".

Colonna also served as a Nice city councillor from 1977 until 1995, when he resigned in order to move to Cargèse.

Colonna was married to Cécile Riou, a fellow teacher and co-worker from Finistère, Brittany, from 1957 until her death in 2025. They had three children, including Yvan Colonna, the Corsican nationalist who was convicted of the murder of prefect Claude Érignac in 1998 and was himself murdered in prison in 2022.

Colonna died in Cargèse on 14 January 2026, at the age of 91.

== Honours ==
- Chevalier of the Legion of Honour (April 1998)
