= List of historical monuments of Ajaccio =

This table shows the list of all historical monuments classified or listed in the city of Ajaccio, Corse-du-Sud, Corsica.

Monument	Address	Coordinates	Notice	Protection	Date	Image
Baptistery Saint John	Rue Alban; Rue du Docteur Del Pellegrino	41.9290°N 8.7380°E	PA2A000004	Classé	2013	
Cathedral of Our Lady of the Assumption	Rue Saint-Charles; Rue Forcioli-Conti	41.9175°N 8.73806°E	PA00099058	Classé	1906	
Chapel of the Greeks	Route des Sanguinaires	41.908903°N 8.71918°E	PA00099059	Inscrit	1927	
Imperial Chapel	Rue Fesch	41.921734°N 8.738315°E	PA00099060	Classé	1924	
Chapel Saint-Erasmus	22 rue Forcioli-Conti	41.916621°N 8.738618°E	PA00099061	Classé	1993	
Castle Conti	Cours Grandval	41.91829°N 8.73181°E	PA00099063	Inscrit	1984	
Citadelle	Boulevard Danielle Casanova	41.916585°N 8.740268°E	PA00099062	Inscrit	1975	
Citadelle Miollis		41.9166°N 8.740359°E	PA2A000020	Inscrit	2016	
Grand Hôtel Continental	Cours Grandval	41.918733°N 8.7325°E	PA00099134	Inscrit	1992	
Hôtel Cyrnos Palace	13 Cours Grandval	41.91706°N 8.728702°E	PA00099135	Inscrit	1990	
Town Hall	Place Foch	41.919299°N 8.738986°E	PA00099127	Inscrit	1990	
Building	9 rue Bonaparte	41.918146°N 8.738766°E	PA00099141	Inscrit	1992	
Lazaret d'Aspreto	Route du Lazaret	41.9282°N 8.7588°E	PA00099064	Inscrit	1977	
Maison Bonaparte	Rue Saint Charles	41.918026°N 8.738567°E	PA00099066	Classé	1924	
Maison des Milelli	Route des Milelli	41.921952°N 8.738632°E	PA00099065	Inscrit; Classé	1958; 2017	
Maison Peraldi	18 rue Forcioli-Conti	41.91677°N 8.73841°E	PA00099067	Inscrit; Classé	1985; 1993	
Alban Manufactory	89 cours Napoléon	41.9292°N 8.7388°E	PA00099142	Inscrit	1992	
Napoleon and his brothers	Place du Diamant	41.9176°N 8.7362°E	PA2A000017	Inscrit	2017	
Saint John the Baptist Oratory	Rue du Roi de Rome	41.9178°N 8.7382°E	PA00099068	Inscrit	1985	
Oratory Saint Roch	Rue Fesch	41.9217°N 8.7381°E	PA00099069	Inscrit	1985	
Episcopal Palace	Rue Fesch	41.9175°N 8.7395°E	PA00099070	Inscrit	1984	
Palais Fesch	48 bis rue Fesch	41.921884°N 8.738613°E	PA00099071	Inscrit; Classé	1976; 2011	
Palais Lantivy	Cours Napoléon	41.919537°N 8.73629°E	PA00099128	Inscrit	1990	
Statue of Cardinal Fesch	Musée Fesch	41.921952°N 8.738632°E	PA2A000018	Classé	2017	
Statue of General Abbatucci	Place Abbatucci	41.925431°N 8.738411°E	PA2A000019	Classé	2017	

== See also ==
- List of historical monuments of Bastia
- Monument historique
