= Yvan Colonna =

Corsican nationalist assassin (1960–2022)

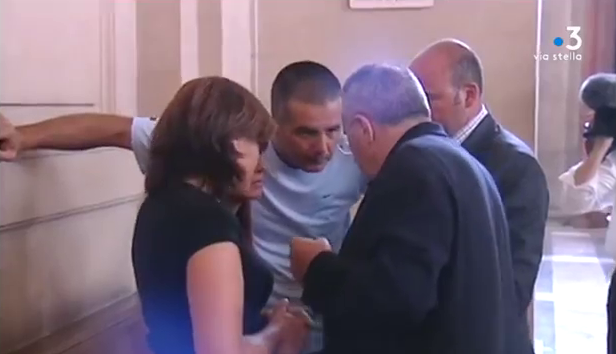
- Yvan Colonna (center) in December 1999
- Born: 7 April 1960; Ajaccio, Corsica, France
- Died: 21 March 2022 (aged 61); 15th arrondissement of Marseille, Bouches-du-Rhône, France
- Occupations: Goatherd, political activist
- Organisation: National Liberation Front of Corsica
- Father: Jean-Hugues Colonna

Yvan Colonna (Corsican: Ivanu Colonna, [iˈvanu koˈlɔnna]; 7 April 1960 – 21 March 2022) was a Corsican nationalist convicted for the 1998 assassination of the prefect of Corse-du-Sud, Claude Érignac. He was beaten to death in prison by another inmate for "disrespecting Muhammad", sparking riots.

== Early life ==
Colonna was born in Ajaccio, France, on 7 April 1960. He was the son of Jean-Hugues Colonna, a member of the National Assembly for the Socialist Party elected in the Alpes-Maritimes and a recipient of the French Légion d'honneur. His mother was from Laz in Brittany. In 1975, his family moved to Nice. After completing his Baccalauréat (French high school), he studied to become a teacher of physical education and sports, but broke off his studies in 1981. He then went to Corsica and moved to Cargèse, where his brother later opened a beach bar. He later took up goat herding, a traditional occupation in Corsica, and joined a nationalist militant faction close to the National Liberation Front of Corsica. He was suspected in several terrorist acts in the region, and notably to have taken part in an attack on the Pietrosella police station.

== Role in the assassination of Prefect Érignac ==
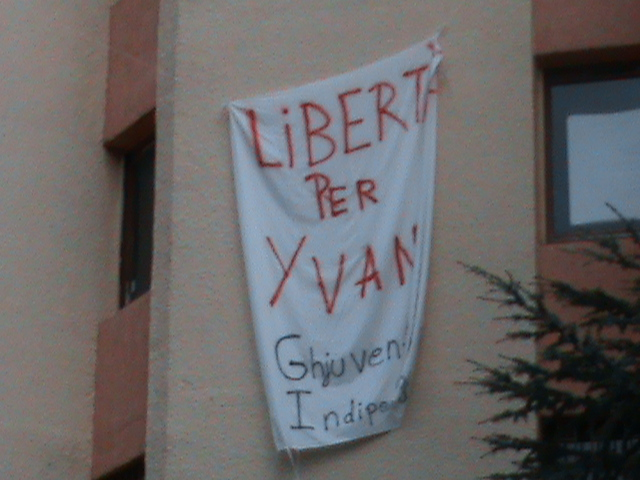
A banner erected by members of Ghjuventù Indipendentista calling for the release of Yvan Colonna. Many banners and graffiti, in and around University of Corsica Pascal Paoli in Corte, show support for the FLNC and Corsican independence.

On 6 February 1998 at 9:05 pm, the prefect of Corsica, Claude Érignac, was assassinated as he exited a theatre onto rue Colonna-d'Ornano in Ajaccio. He was shot in the neck with three 9 mm bullets and died shortly thereafter. The weapon was later found to be one of the guns stolen in the attack on the Gendarmerie station in Pietrosella on 6 September 1997.

The following inquiry resulted in the arrest of several militants, and their interrogation pointed towards Yvan Colonna as the culprit. By the time police went to question him, he had already fled, which sparked the biggest manhunt in French history. Colonna was thought to have left the country, possibly for South America. However, an infrared camera set in the mountains of Corsica, near Vico as surveillance of a bergerie, a traditional Corsican shepherd stone hut, yielded evidence that Colonna was hiding there. He was arrested on 4 June 2003.

Charged with assassination and of being a member of a terrorist organisation, he was arraigned on 12 November 2007 before the court in Paris which handles terrorism cases. The court was in session until 12 December 2007. During his pre-trial internment, he repeatedly claimed innocence, and that he was the victim of unfair press coverage that had convicted him before trial. On 13 December 2007, Colonna was pronounced guilty and sentenced to life imprisonment. He later appealed.

On 20 June 2011, Colonna's conviction was upheld on appeal, and he spent the remainder of his life in the Toulon-La Farlède detention centre.

== Death ==
On 2 March 2022, Colonna was attacked in prison by Franck Elong Abé, a 36-year-old inmate, reportedly for "disrespecting Muhammad". In response, violent unrest broke out across Corsica. After spending three weeks in a coma at a hospital, he died of his wounds on 21 March 2022, at the age of 61.
