= Torra di Micalona =

Genoese coastal defence tower in Corsica

Tower of Micalona
- Torra di Micalona (Corsican)
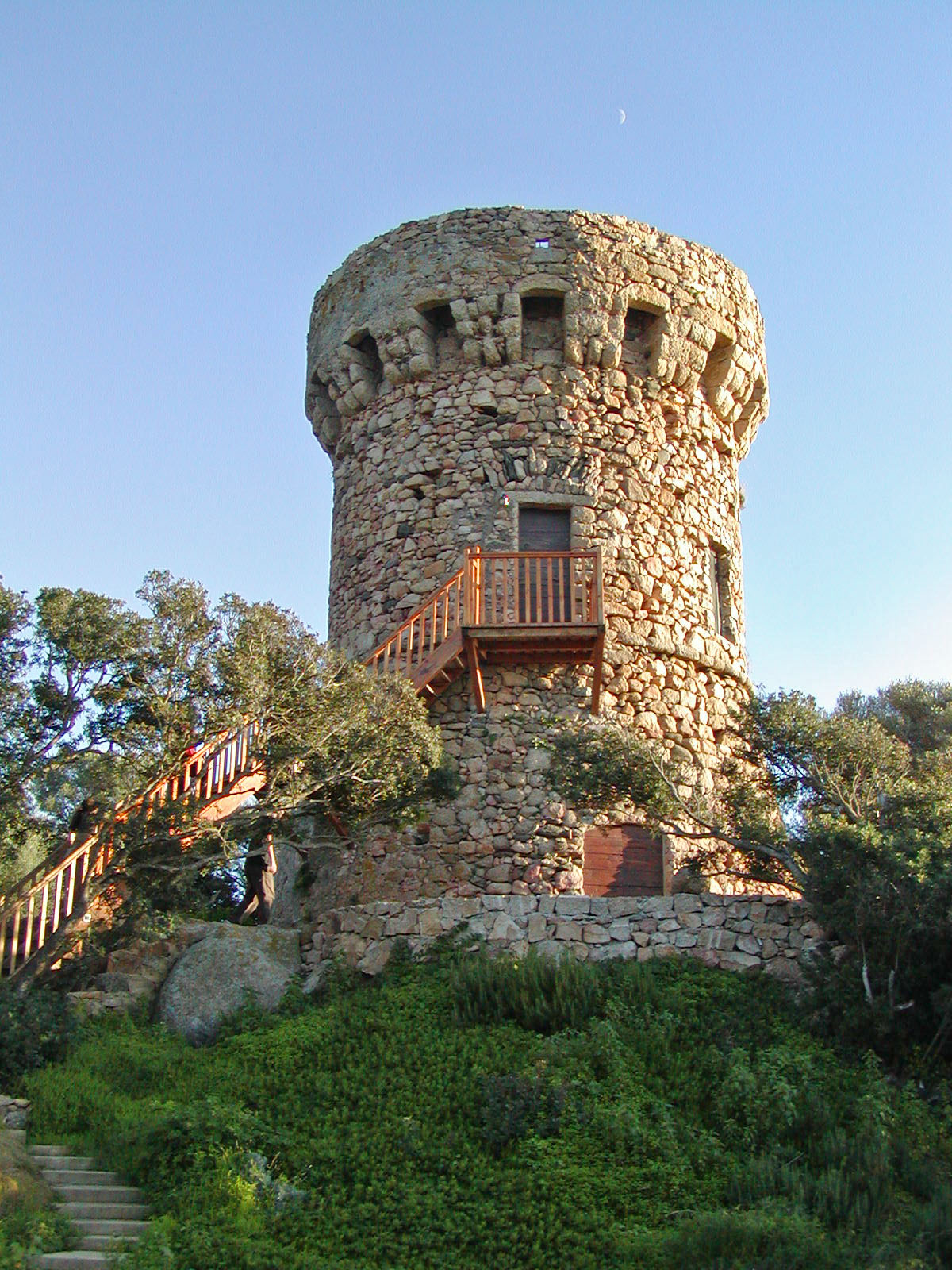

- Location within Corsica
- 41°42′34″N 8°50′3″E

History
- Built: Second half 16th century

The Tower of Micalona (Corsican: Torra di Micalona) is a Genoese tower located in the commune of Olmeto on the west coast of the Corsica.

The tower was one of a series of coastal defences constructed by the Republic of Genoa between 1530 and 1620 to stem the attacks by Barbary pirates.

== See also ==
- List of Genoese towers in Corsica
