= Turra di a Calanca =

Genoese coastal defence tower in Corsica

Tower of Calanca
- Turra di a Calanca (Corsican)
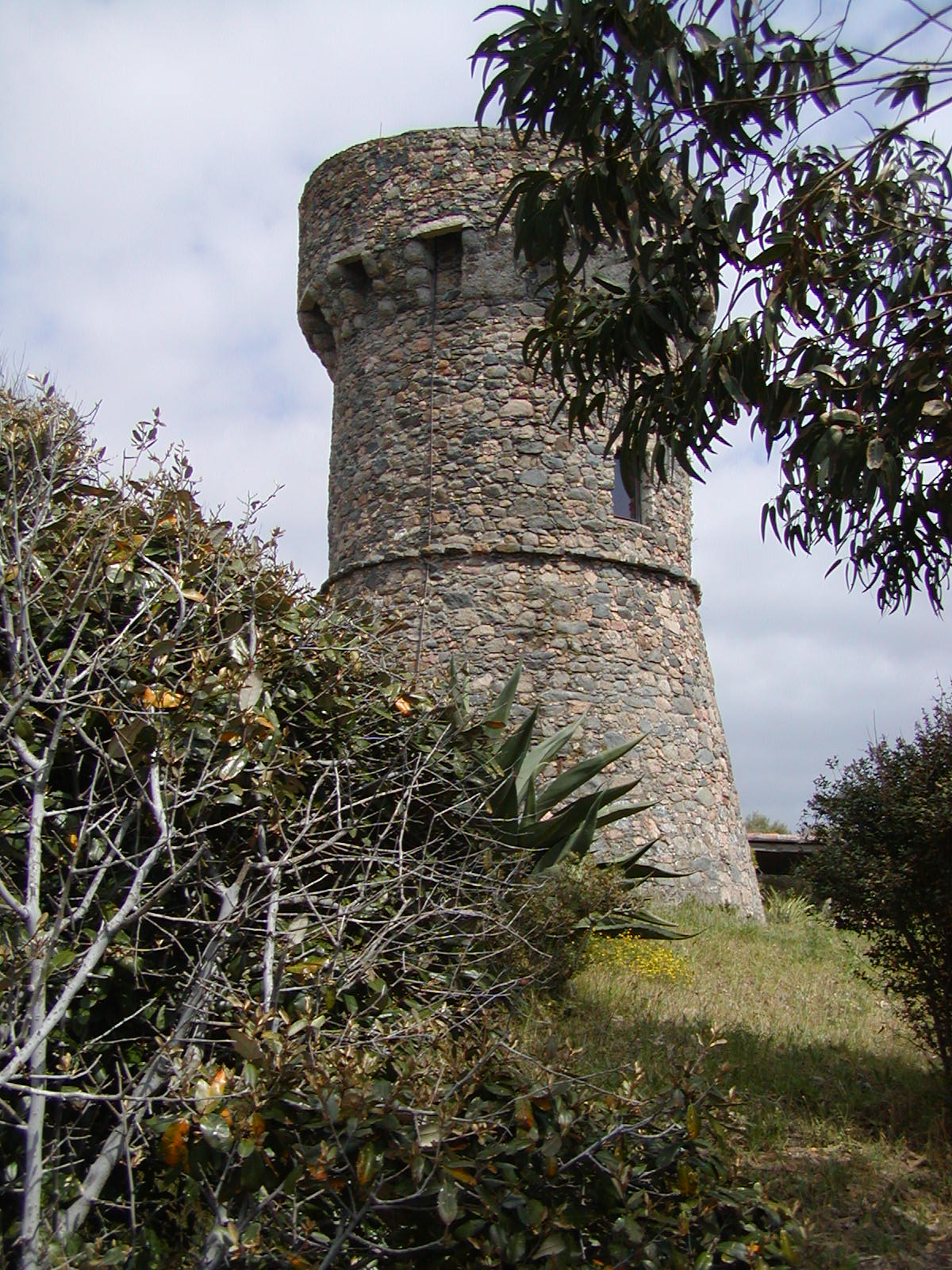

- Location within Corsica
- 41°41′26″N 8°53′19″E

History
- Built: Second half 16th century

The Tower of Calanca (Corsican: Turra di a Calanca) is a Genoese tower located in the commune of Olmeto on the west coast of Corsica.

The tower was built in the second half of the 16th century. It was one of a series of coastal defences constructed by the Republic of Genoa between 1530 and 1620 to stem the attacks by Barbary pirates.

== See also ==
- List of Genoese towers in Corsica
