= Tower of San Ciprianu =

Genoese coastal defence tower in Corsica

- torra di San Ciprianu (Corsican)
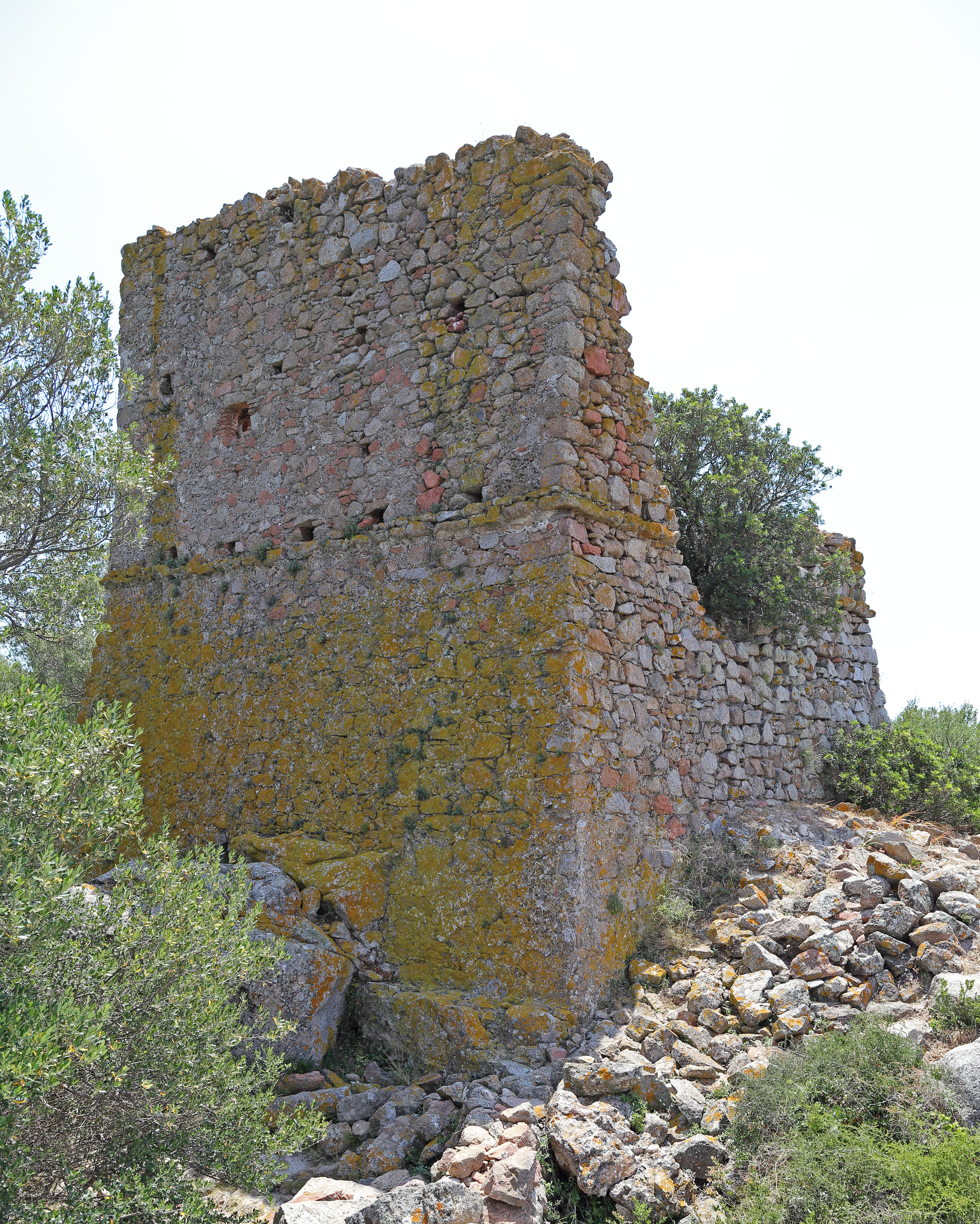

- Location within Corsica
- 41°37′36″N 9°20′45″E

History
- Built: 1589

Monument historique
- Designated: 24 January 1995
- Reference no.: PA00135315

The Tower of San Ciprianu (Corsican: torra di San Ciprianu or torre di San Ciprianu, [ˈtɔrra di ˈsan t͡ʃipriˈanu], [ˈtɔrrɛ]; Italian: torre di San Cipriano; lit. 'St. Cyprian's Tower') is a Genoese tower located in the French commune of Lecci, Southern Corsica. The tower sits at an elevation of 57 m and guarded the entrance to the port of Porto-Vecchio.

The construction of the tower was begun in 1589. It is one of a series of coastal defences constructed by the Republic of Genoa between 1530 and 1620 to stem the attacks by Barbary pirates. The design of the San Ciprianu tower is unusual in being square rather than round. The tower is privately owned and in 1995 was listed as one of the official historical monuments of France.

== See also ==
- List of Genoese towers in Corsica
