= Belvédère-Campomoro =

Commune in Corsica, France

- Commune
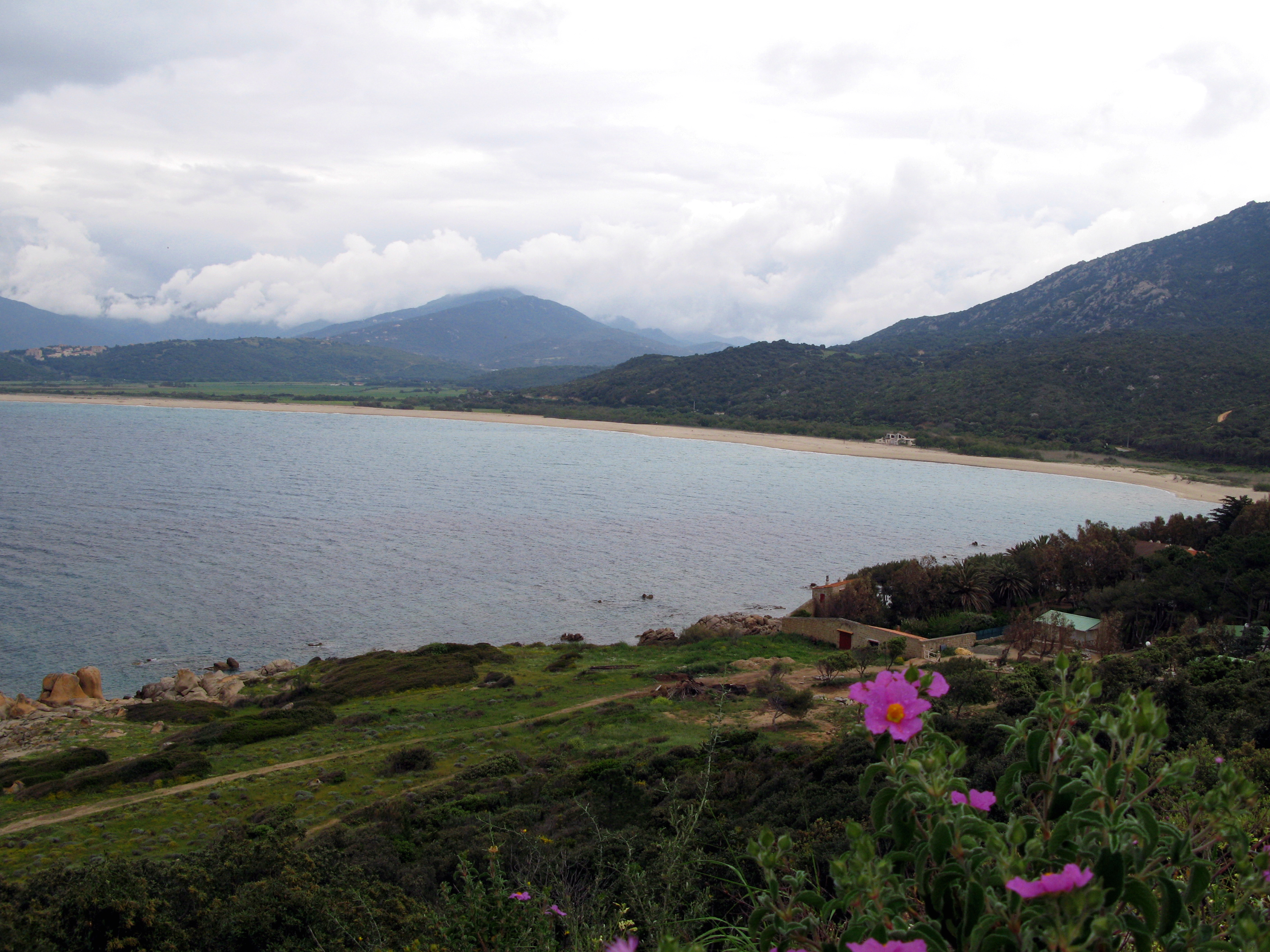
- Campomoro beach
- Location of Belvédère-Campomoro
- Location within France Location within Corsica
- Coordinates: 41°37′43″N 8°48′56″E
- Country: France
- Region: Corsica
- Department: Corse-du-Sud
- Arrondissement: Sartène
- Canton: Sartenais-Valinco

Government
  - Mayor (2021–2026): Don Georges Simeoni
- Area^{1}: 26.37 km^{2} (10.18 sq mi)
- Highest elevation: 442 m (1,450 ft)
- Lowest elevation: 0 m (0 ft)
- Population (2023): 213
  - Density: 8.08/km^{2} (20.9/sq mi)
- Time zone: UTC+01:00 (CET)
  - Summer (DST): UTC+02:00 (CEST)
- INSEE/Postal code: 2A035 /20110
- ^{1} French Land Register data, which excludes lakes, ponds, glaciers > 1 km^{2} (0.386 sq mi or 247 acres) and river estuaries.

Belvédère-Campomoro (French pronunciation: [bɛlvedɛʁ kɑ̃pɔmɔʁo]; Italian: Belvedere-Campomoro, [ˌbɛlveˈdere kampoˈmɔro]; Corsican: Belvideri è Campumoru or Bilvidè è Campumoru) is a commune in the French department of Corse-du-Sud on the island of Corsica.

== Geography ==
=== Neighborhoods, hamlets, localities and gaps ===
It is composed of:

- The village of Belvédère (Belvidè), historic heart of the commune, overlooking the Gulf of Propriano from its 220 meters above sea level and facing Tivolaggio.
- The seaside village of Campomoro (Campomoru), today the most important inhabited place in the commune, nestled at the bottom of the bay of the same name at the foot of a Genoese tower.
- The seaside village of Portigliolo (Purtiddolu), which Belvédère shares with Tivolaggio, a village attached since 1974 to Propriano.

== Population ==
Historical population
Year	Pop.	±% p.a.
1968	90	—
1975	82	−1.32%
1982	106	+3.74%
1990	128	+2.39%
1999	135	+0.59%
2007	162	+2.31%
2012	153	−1.14%
2017	165	+1.52%
2023	213	+4.35%
Source: INSEE

== See also ==
- Torra di Campomoru
- Communes of the Corse-du-Sud department
