= Torra di Campumoru =

Genoese coastal defence tower in Corsica

Tower of Campumoru
- Torra di Campumoru (Corsican)
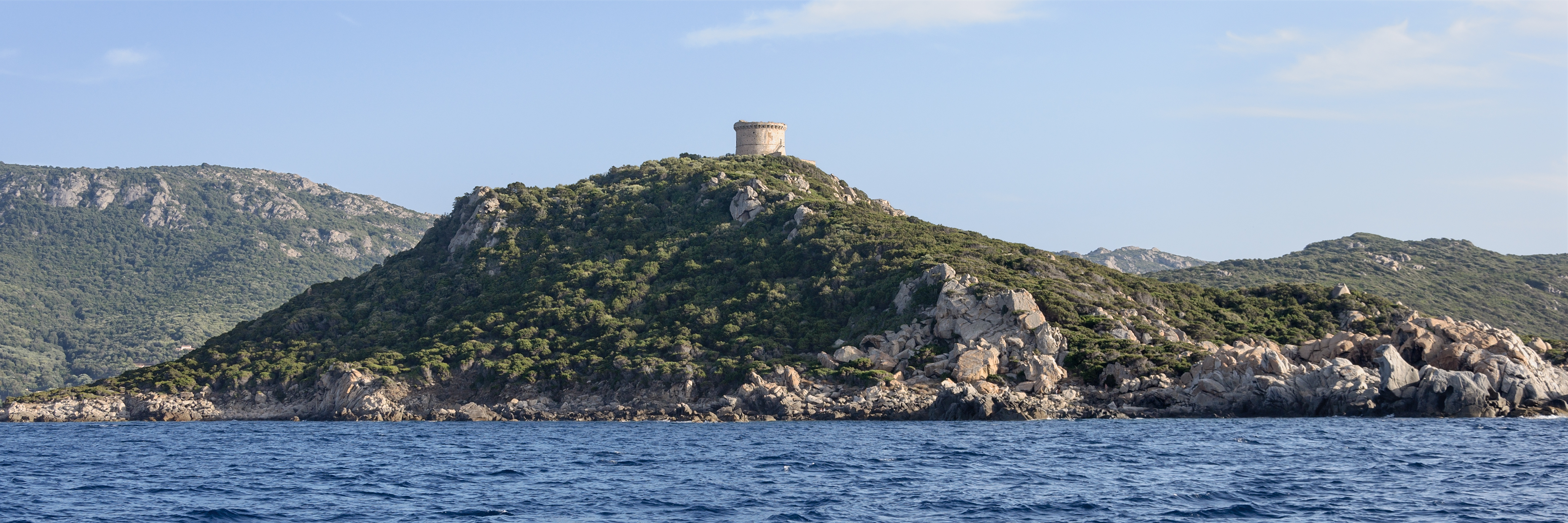

- Location within Corsica
- 41°38′20″N 8°48′26″E

History
- Built: 1585-1586

Site notes
- Architect: Carlo Spinosa

Monument historique
- Designated: 4 August 1992
- Reference no.: PA00099143

The Tower of Campumoru (Corsican: Torra di Campumoru) is a Genoese tower located in the commune of Belvédère-Campomoro (Corse-du-Sud) on the west coast of the French island of Corsica. The tower sits at an elevation of 78 m (256 ft) on the Punta di Campomoro headland which forms the southern limit of the Golfe de Valinco.

The tower was designed by Carlo Spinosa and built between 1585 and 1586 by the master-mason Giorgio Canton. It was one of a series of coastal defences constructed by the Republic of Genoa between 1530 and 1620 to stem the attacks by Barbary pirates. In 1992 the tower was listed as one of the official historical monuments of France.

Since 1986 the tower has been owned and maintained by a French government agency, the Conservatoire du littoral. The agency plans to purchase 132 ha (330 acres) of the headland and as of 2011 had acquired 70 ha (170 acres).

== See also ==
- List of Genoese towers in Corsica
