= Pietrosella =

Commune in Corsica, France

- Commune
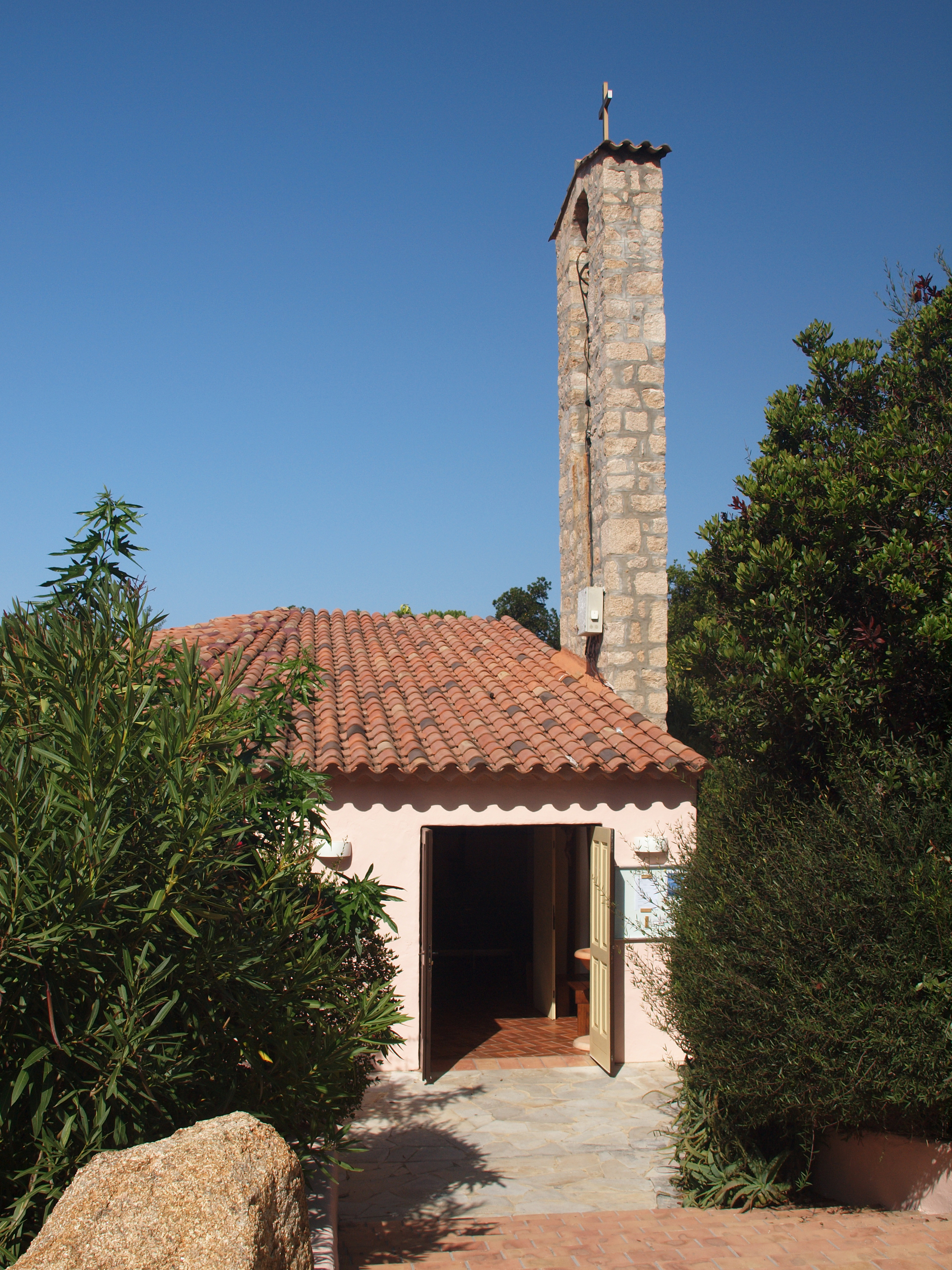
- The parish church of Sainte-Monique
- Location of Pietrosella
- Location within France Location within Corsica
- Coordinates: 41°50′15″N 8°50′48″E
- Country: France
- Region: Corsica
- Department: Corse-du-Sud
- Arrondissement: Ajaccio
- Canton: Taravo-Ornano

Government
  - Mayor (2020–2026): Jean-Baptiste Luccioni
- Area^{1}: 35.23 km^{2} (13.60 sq mi)
- Elevation: 550 m (1,800 ft)
- Highest elevation: 728 m (2,388 ft)
- Lowest elevation: 0 m (0 ft)
- Population (2023): 2,074
  - Density: 58.87/km^{2} (152.5/sq mi)
- Time zone: UTC+01:00 (CET)
  - Summer (DST): UTC+02:00 (CEST)
- INSEE/Postal code: 2A228 /20166
- ^{1} French Land Register data, which excludes lakes, ponds, glaciers > 1 km^{2} (0.386 sq mi or 247 acres) and river estuaries.

Pietrosella (French pronunciation: [pjɛtʁozela]; Corsican: Pitrusedda) is a French commune in the department of Corse-du-Sud, on the island of Corsica.

== History ==
On 6 September 1997, members of the National Liberation Front of Corsica's dissident Cargèse-Sagone brigade stormed a gendarmerie barracks at Pietrosella. The weapons stolen from the attack were used to assassinate Claude Érignac on 6 February 1998, homicide committed by Yvan Colonna who was arrested and sentenced to life imprisonment.

== Population ==
Historical population
Year	Pop.	±% p.a.
1968	118	—
1975	350	+16.80%
1982	738	+11.25%
1990	864	+1.99%
1999	1,028	+1.95%
2007	1,223	+2.19%
2012	1,258	+0.57%
2017	1,685	+6.02%
2023	2,074	+3.52%
Source: INSEE

== See also ==
- Torra di l'Isuledda
- Communes of the Corse-du-Sud department
