= Petreto-Bicchisano =

Commune in Corsica, France

- Commune
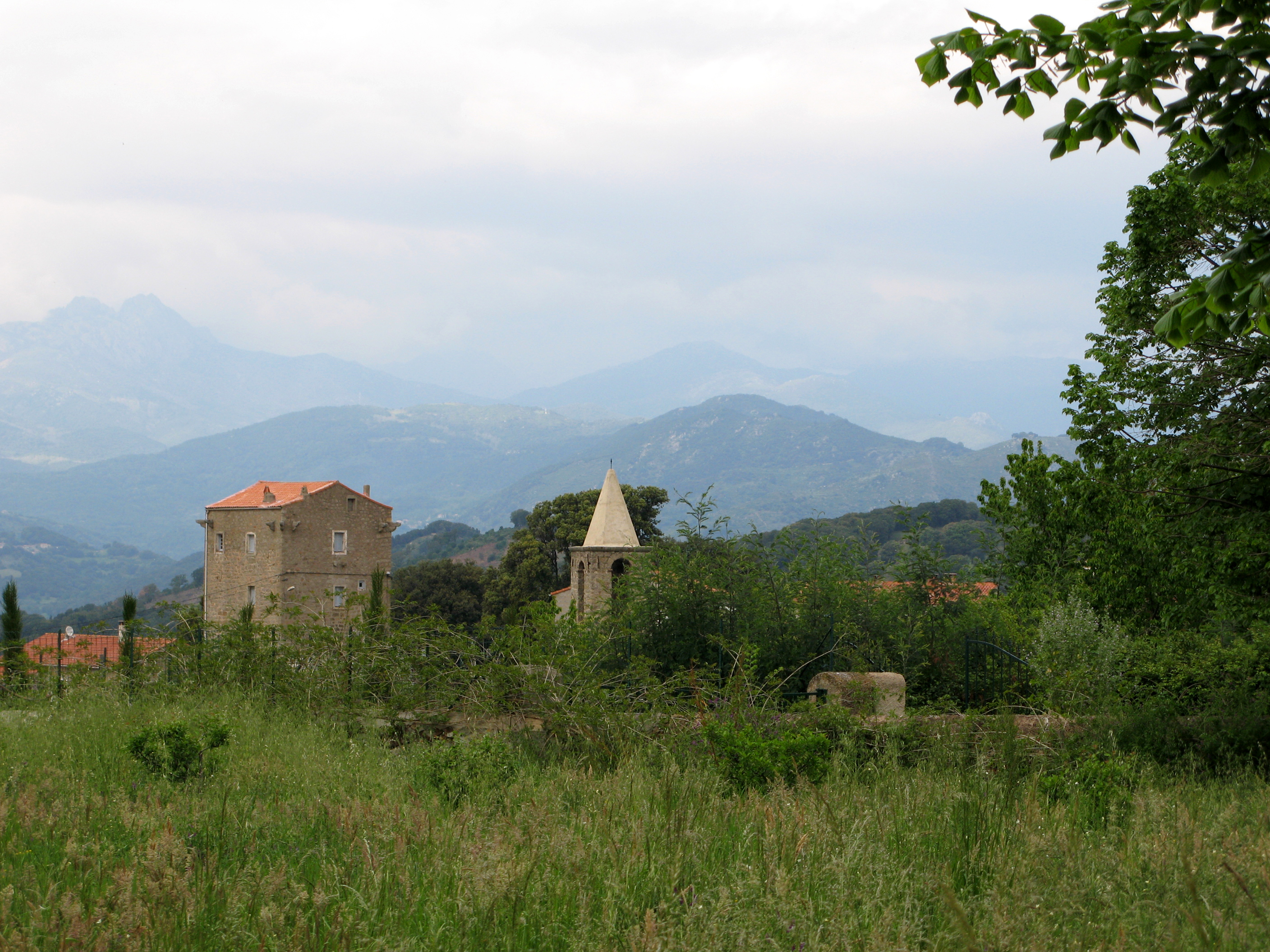
- Buildings and landscape of Petreto-Bicchisano
- Location of Petreto-Bicchisano
- Location within France Location within Corsica
- Coordinates: 41°47′03″N 8°58′51″E
- Country: France
- Region: Corsica
- Department: Corse-du-Sud
- Arrondissement: Sartène
- Canton: Taravo-Ornano

Government
  - Mayor (2020–2026): Jacques Nicolaï
- Area^{1}: 39.27 km^{2} (15.16 sq mi)
- Elevation: 550 m (1,800 ft)
- Highest elevation: 1,397 m (4,583 ft)
- Lowest elevation: 38 m (125 ft)
- Population (2023): 572
  - Density: 14.6/km^{2} (37.7/sq mi)
- Time zone: UTC+01:00 (CET)
  - Summer (DST): UTC+02:00 (CEST)
- INSEE/Postal code: 2A211 /20140
- ^{1} French Land Register data, which excludes lakes, ponds, glaciers > 1 km^{2} (0.386 sq mi or 247 acres) and river estuaries.

Petreto-Bicchisano (French pronunciation: [petʁɛto bikizano]; Corsican: Pitretu è Bicchisgià) is a commune in the Corse-du-Sud department of France on the island of Corsica.

== Population ==
Historical population
Year	Pop.	±% p.a.
1968	747	—
1975	659	−1.77%
1982	643	−0.35%
1990	585	−1.17%
1999	549	−0.70%
2007	566	+0.38%
2012	561	−0.18%
2017	564	+0.11%
2023	572	+0.24%
Source: INSEE

== Settiva ==
Settiva is an archaeological site in Corsica. It is located in the commune.

== See also ==
- Communes of the Corse-du-Sud department
