= Araghju =

Archeological site in France

Coordinates: 41°38′53″N 9°15′44″E

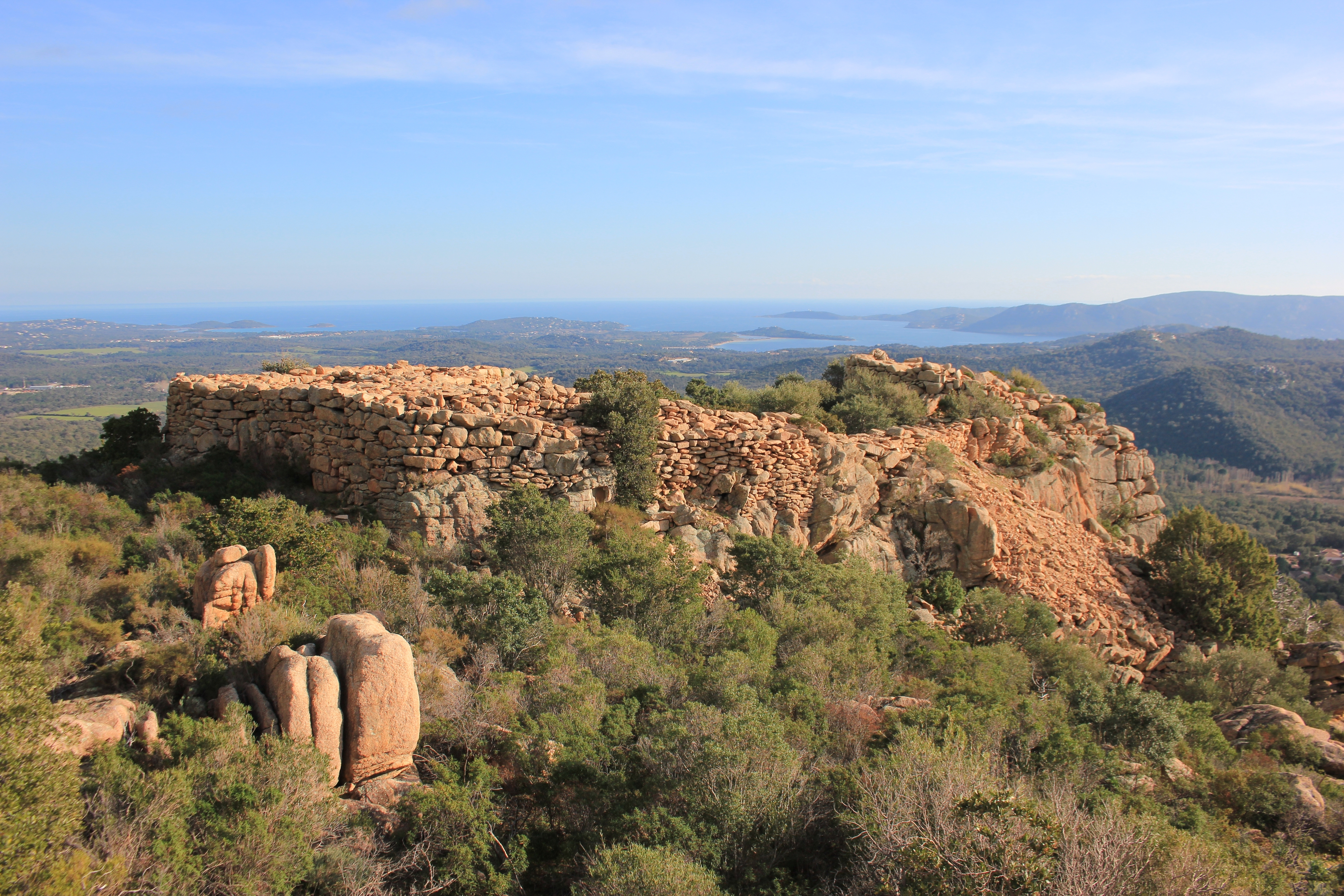
Araghju

Araghju (Corsican: Castellu d'Araghju) is an archaeological site in Corsica. It is located in the commune of San-Gavino-di-Carbini.
