= Torra di l'Isuledda =

Genoese coastal defence tower in Corsica

Tower of Isuledda
- Torra di l'Isuledda (Corsican)
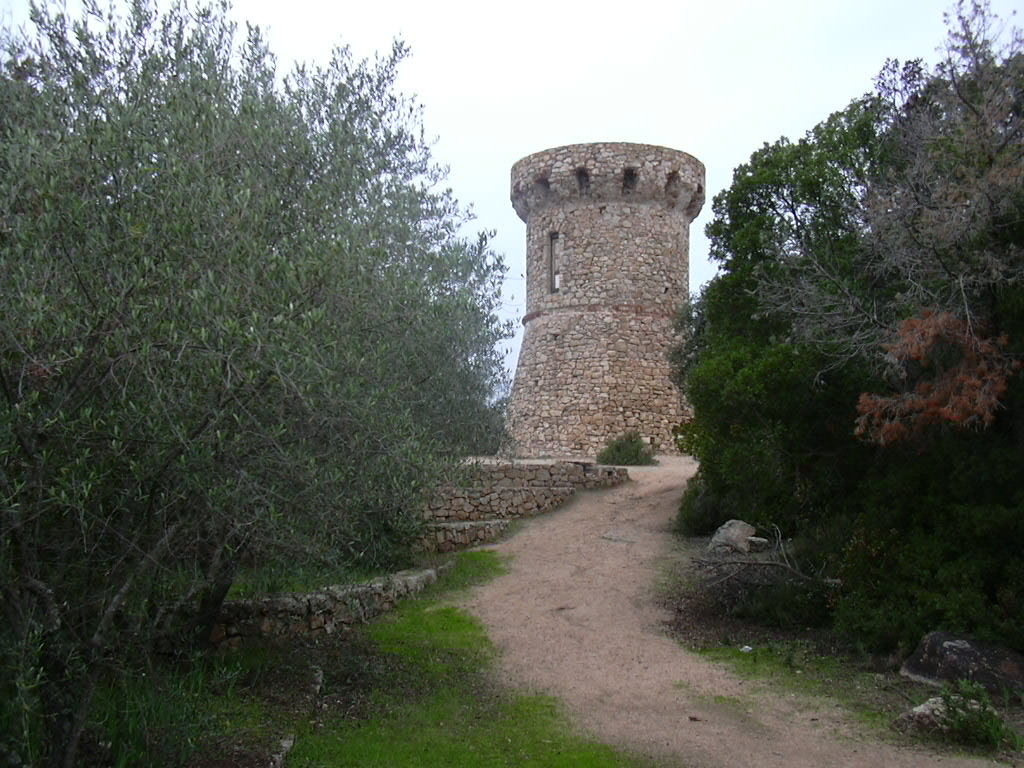

- Location within Corsica
- 41°50′40″N 8°45′17″E

History
- Built: 1597

Monument historique
- Designated: 4 August 1992
- Reference no.: PA00099144

The Tower of Isuledda (Corsican: Torra di l'Isuledda) is a Genoese tower located in the commune of Pietrosella (Corse-du-Sud) on the Corsica. The tower sits at an elevation of 68 m on a promontory, the Punta di Sette Nave, which forms the southern limit of the Gulf of Ajaccio.

The tower was built in around 1597. It was one of a series of coastal defences constructed by the Republic of Genoa between 1530 and 1620 to stem the attacks by Barbary pirates. The tower was restored in 1970 and listed as one of the official historical monuments of France in 1992. It is owned by the commune of Pietrosella.

== See also ==
- List of Genoese towers in Corsica
