= Lecci =

Commune in Corsica, France

- Commune
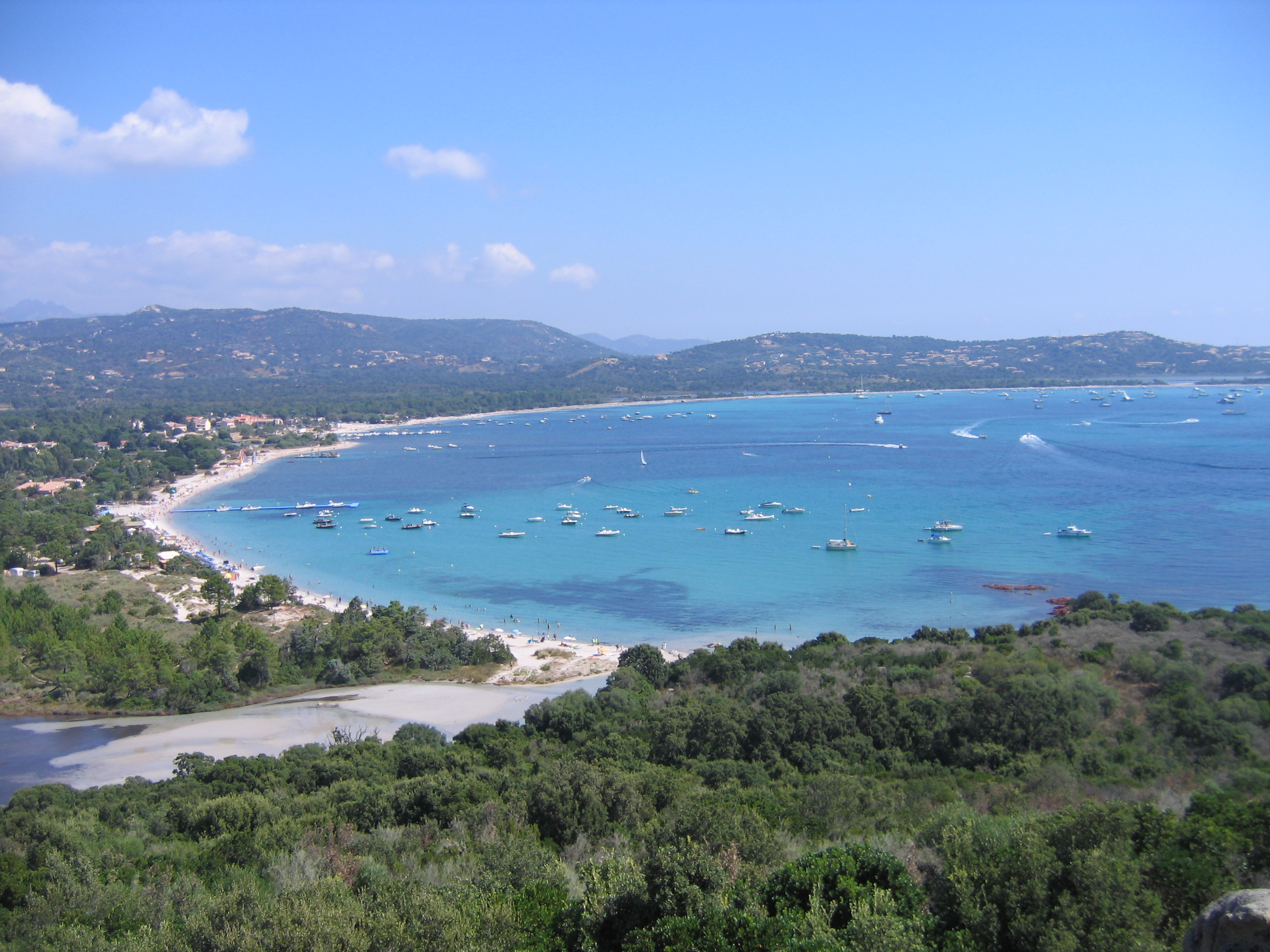
- The Gulf of St. Cyprien with the commune of Lecci
- Location of Lecci
- Location within France Location within Corsica
- Coordinates: 41°40′48″N 9°19′05″E
- Country: France
- Region: Corsica
- Department: Corse-du-Sud
- Arrondissement: Sartène
- Canton: Bavella

Government
  - Mayor (2020–2026): Don Georges Gianni
- Area^{1}: 27.41 km^{2} (10.58 sq mi)
- Elevation: 140 m (460 ft)
- Highest elevation: 646 m (2,119 ft)
- Lowest elevation: 0 m (0 ft)
- Population (2023): 2,134
  - Density: 77.85/km^{2} (201.6/sq mi)
- Time zone: UTC+01:00 (CET)
  - Summer (DST): UTC+02:00 (CEST)
- INSEE/Postal code: 2A139 /20137
- ^{1} French Land Register data, which excludes lakes, ponds, glaciers > 1 km^{2} (0.386 sq mi or 247 acres) and river estuaries.

Lecci is a commune in the Corse-du-Sud department of France on the island of Corsica. Its name comes from the Italian word for holly oak, which was an important resource for many years.

== Population ==
Historical population
Year	Pop.	±% p.a.
1968	484	—
1975	578	+2.57%
1982	678	+2.31%
1990	709	+0.56%
1999	706	−0.05%
2007	1,088	+5.55%
2012	1,419	+5.46%
2017	1,735	+4.10%
2023	2,134	+3.51%
Source: INSEE

== Sights ==
- Torra di San Benedettu
- Torra di San Ciprianu

== See also ==
- Communes of the Corse-du-Sud department
- Former railway station
