= Olmeto =

Commune in Corsica, France

- Commune
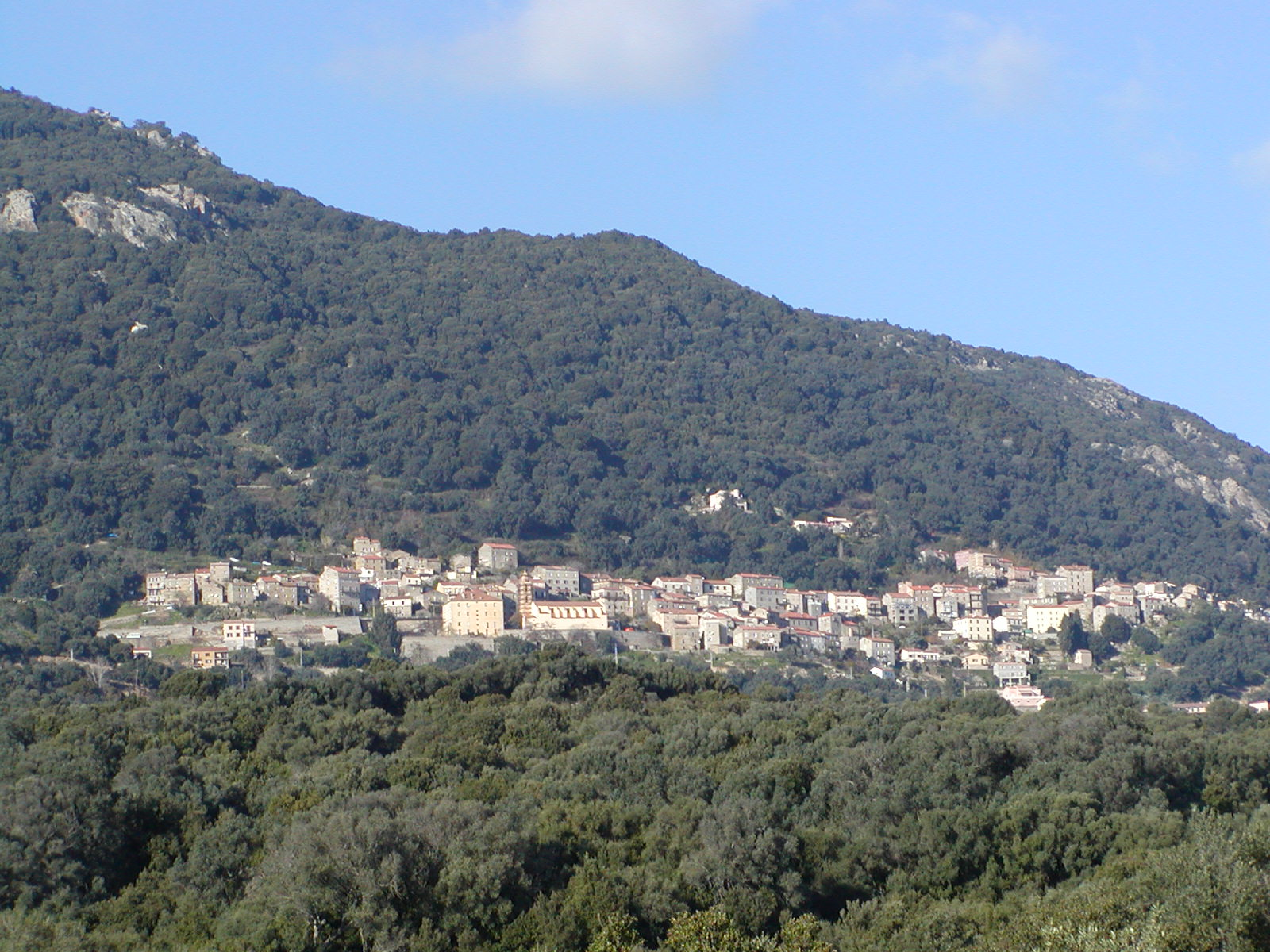
- A general view of Olmeto
- Location of Olmeto
- Location within France Location within Corsica
- Coordinates: 41°43′06″N 8°55′08″E
- Country: France
- Region: Corsica
- Department: Corse-du-Sud
- Arrondissement: Sartène
- Canton: Sartenais-Valinco

Government
  - Mayor (2020–2026): José Pierre Mozziconacci
- Area^{1}: 43.82 km^{2} (16.92 sq mi)
- Elevation: 360 m (1,180 ft)
- Highest elevation: 1,055 m (3,461 ft)
- Lowest elevation: 0 m (0 ft)
- Population (2023): 1,289
  - Density: 29.42/km^{2} (76.19/sq mi)
- Time zone: UTC+01:00 (CET)
  - Summer (DST): UTC+02:00 (CEST)
- INSEE/Postal code: 2A189 /20113
- ^{1} French Land Register data, which excludes lakes, ponds, glaciers > 1 km^{2} (0.386 sq mi or 247 acres) and river estuaries.

Olmeto is a commune in the Corse-du-Sud department of France on the island of Corsica.

== Population ==
Historical population
Year	Pop.	±% p.a.
1968	685	—
1975	730	+0.91%
1982	676	−1.09%
1990	1,019	+5.26%
1999	1,115	+1.01%
2007	1,199	+0.91%
2012	1,213	+0.23%
2017	1,216	+0.05%
2023	1,289	+0.98%
Source: INSEE

== Archaeological sites ==
There are two archaeological sites in the commune: Cuntorba and Figa la Sarra.

== See also ==
- Tour de la Calanca
- Tour de Micalona
- Communes of the Corse-du-Sud department
