= Sartène Town Hall =

Coordinates: 41.62106°N 8.97194°E

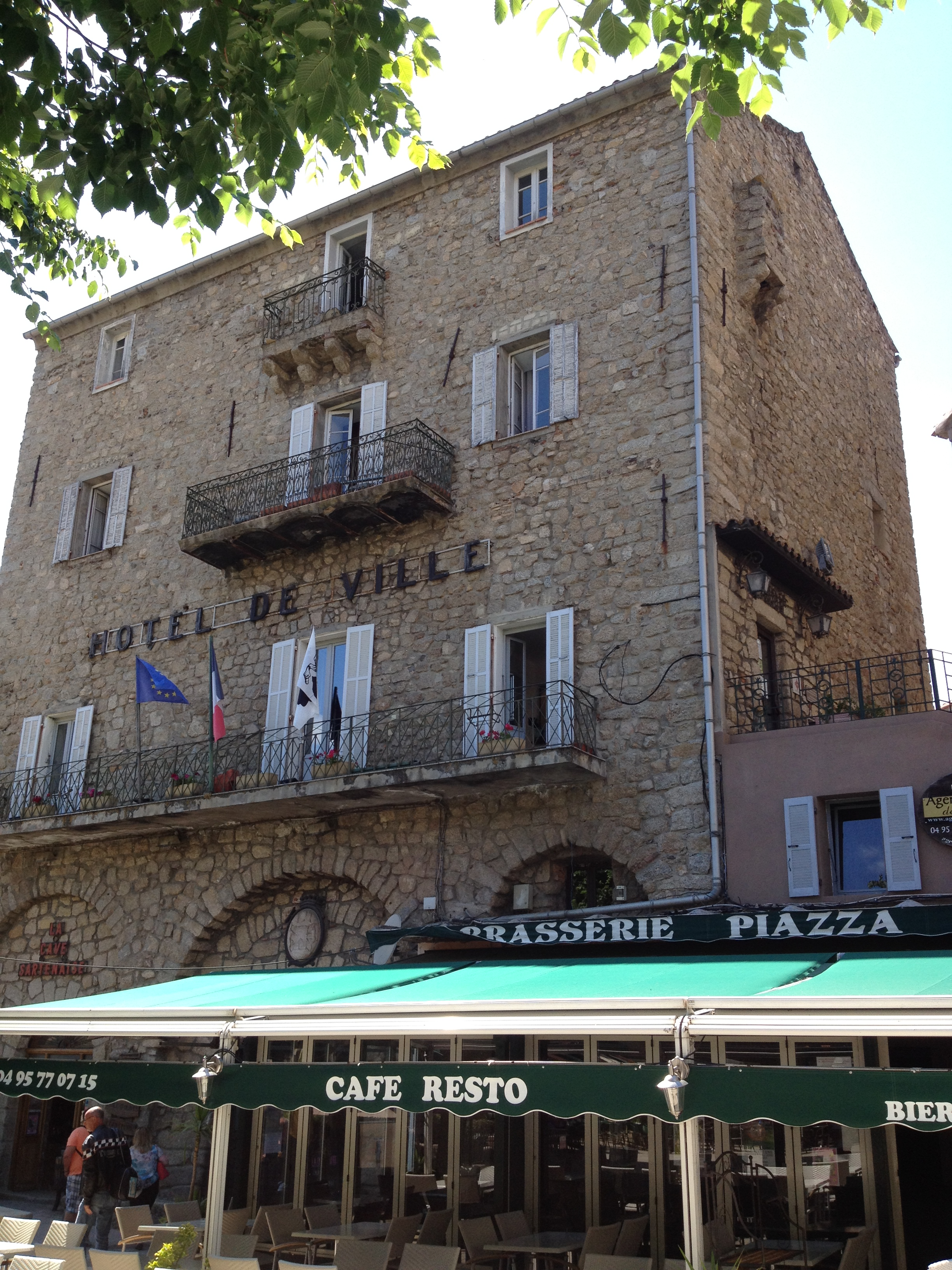
Sartène Town Hall

Sartène Town Hall (Corsican: Casa Cumuna Sartè) is the Town Hall in Sartène, Southern Corsica, Corsica. The building is the subject of an inscription in respect of the historic monuments by decree of March 8, 1991.
