= Torra di Caldarellu =

Genoese coastal defence tower in Corsica

Tower of Caldarellu
- Torra di Caldarellu (Corsican)
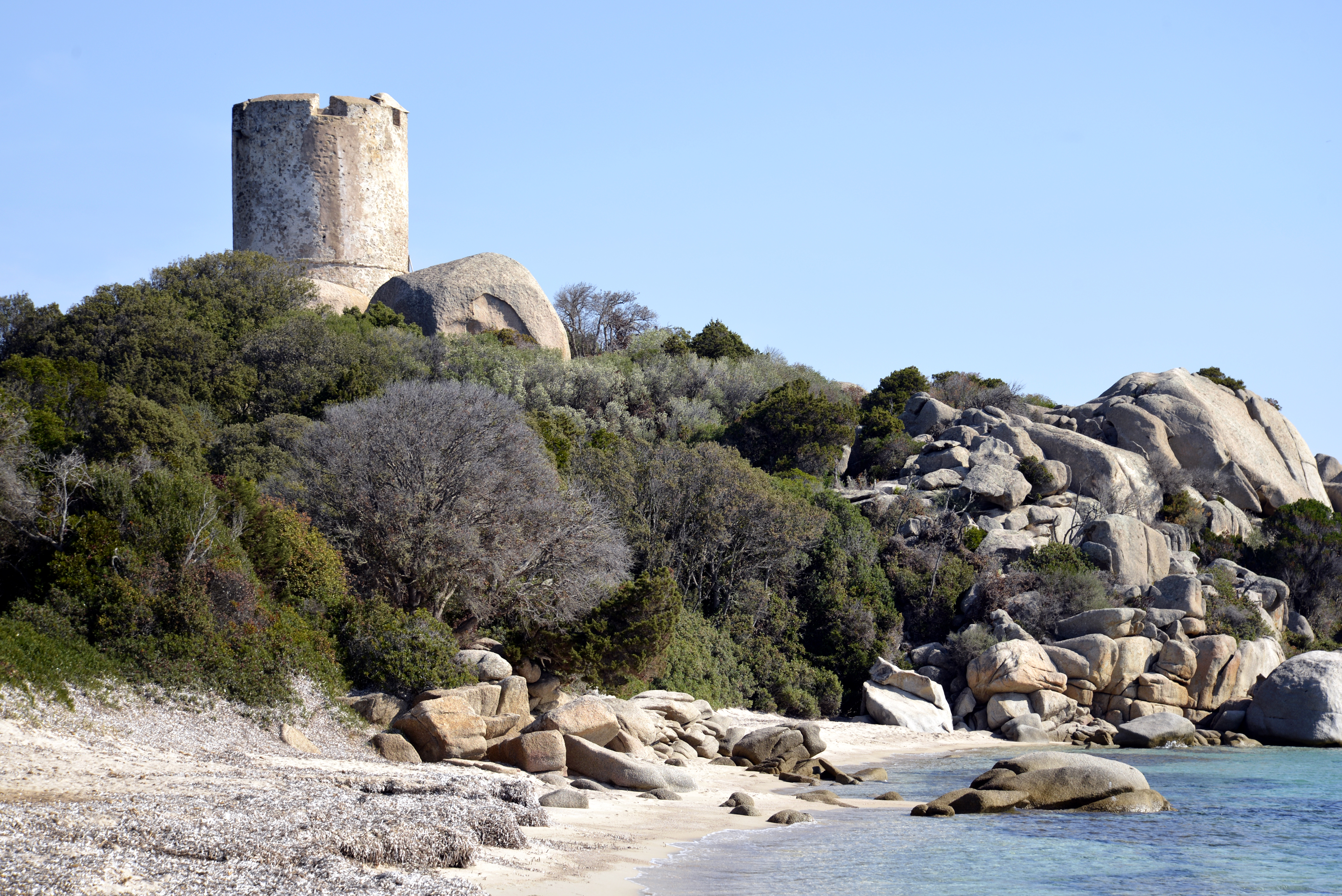

- Location within Corsica
- 41°27′53″N 9°03′29″E

History
- Built: 1586-1617

Monument historique
- Designated: 24 January 1995
- Reference no.: PA00135316

The Tower of Caldarellu or the Tower of Figari (Corsican: Torra di Caldarellu) is a Genoese tower located in the commune of Pianottoli-Caldarello (Corse-du-Sud) on the southwest coast of the Corsica. The tower sits at an elevation of 16 metres (52 ft) on the north shore of the Baie de Figari.

The tower was built sometime between 1586 and 1617. It was one of a series of coastal defences built by the Republic of Genoa between 1530 and 1620 to stem the attacks by Barbary pirates. In 1995 the tower was listed as one of the official historical monuments of France.

== See also ==
- List of Genoese towers in Corsica
