= List of historical monuments in Bastia =

This table shows the list of all historical monuments classified or listed in the city of Bastia, Haute-Corse, Corsica.

Monument	Address	Coordinates	Notice	Protection	Date	Image
Boutique Mattei	15 boulevard du Général-de-Gaulle	42.701443°N 9.450727°E	PA2B000029	Inscrit	2016	
Notre-Dame Chapel	Chemin de Scala Santa	42.6906°N 9.4382°E	PA00135318	Inscrit	1995	
Citadelle de Bastia		42.6935334°N 9.4511551°E	PA00099158	Inscrit; Classé	1935; 1977	
Church of the Conception	Rue Napoléon; Ruelle de la Création	42.6974°N 9.4501°E	PA00099159	Classé	2000	
Church of Our Lady of Victories	Place Notre-Dame-des-Victoires	42.6807°N 9.4412°E	PA2B000013	Inscrit	2008	
Saint Charles Borromeo Church	Rue Jean Baptiste de Caraffa	42.6953°N 9.4476°E	PA2B000006	Inscrit	2007	
Holy Cross Church		42.69255°N 9.452314°E	PA00099161	Classé	1931	
St. Stephen's Church	Piazza di a Chjesa; Cardo	42.7024°N 9.4275°E	PA00125388	Inscrit	1993	
St. Stephen's Church	Piazza di a Chjesa; Cardo	42.7024°N 9.4275°E	PA00099179	Inscrit	1927	
Église Saint-Jean-Baptiste		42.696969°N 9.450354°E	PA00099160	Classé	2000	
House Castagnola	4 rue des Terrasses	42.6966°N 9.4494°E	PA00125389	Inscrit	1993	
Oratory Saint Roch	Rue Napoléon	42.6983°N 9.4503°E	PA2B000007	Classé	2007	
Caraffa Palace	2-4 rue Chanoine Letteron	42.695°N 9.4479°E	PA2B000017	Inscrit	2009	
Courthouse	Rond-point Moro-Giafferi	42.6952°N 9.446°E	PA00099163	Inscrit; Classé	1979; 1992	
St. Mary's Cathedral		42.6923668°N 9.4517186°E	PA00099162	Classé	2000	
Set consisting of the Saint-Charles railing, the Romieu staircase and the Romieu garden		42.694167°N 9.421337°E	PA2B000039	Inscrit	2017	
Statue of Napoleon I	Place Saint-Nicolas	42.6998°N 9.4509°E	PA2B000012	Classé	2010	

== See also ==
- List of historical monuments of Ajaccio
- Monument historique
