= Palais Lantivy =

Government building in Ajaccio, Corsica

Coordinates: 41°55′10″N 8°44′11″E

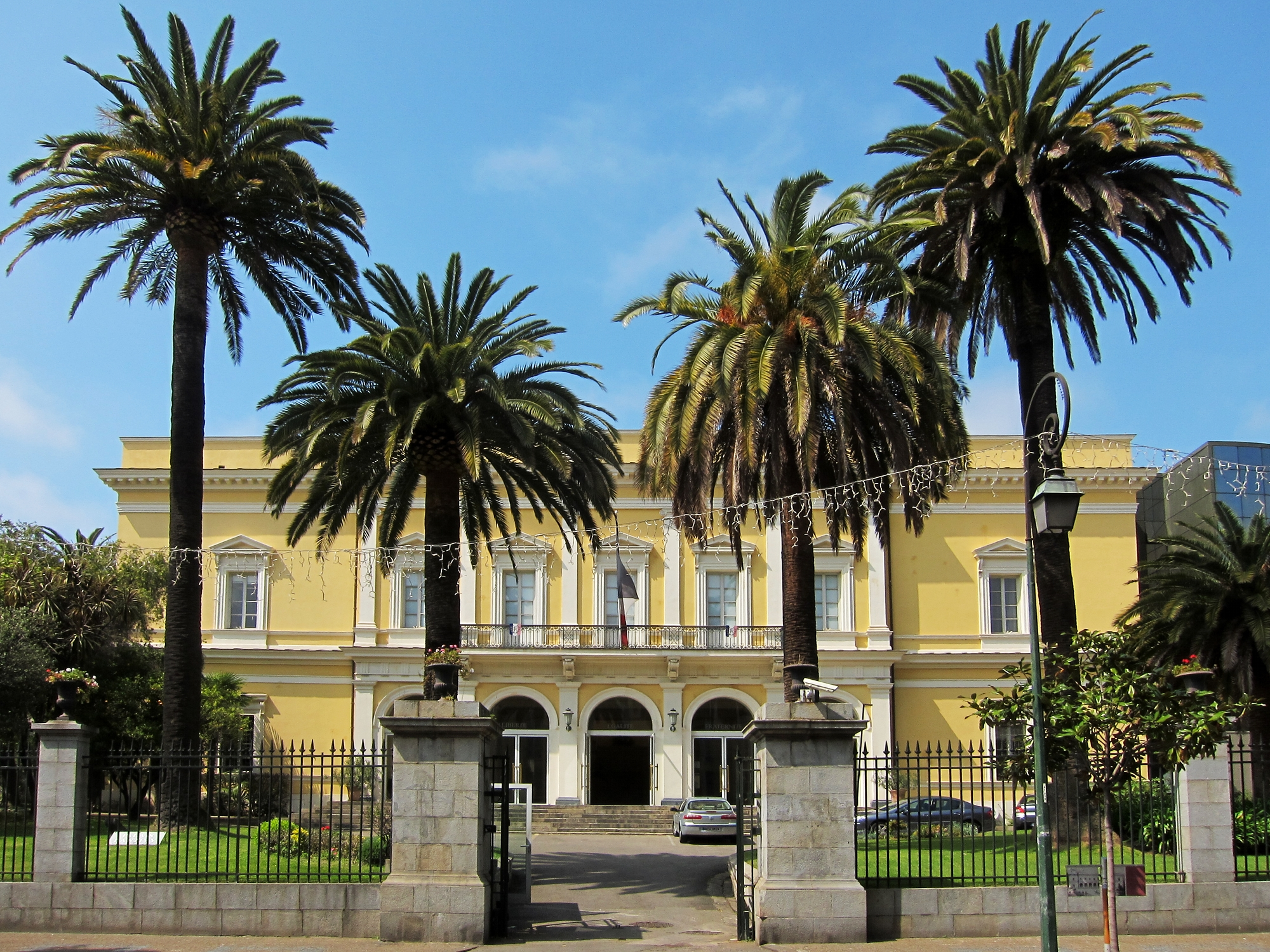
Palais Lantivy

Palais Lantivy is a Neoclassical palace in Ajaccio, Corsica. It serves as the Corsican Prefecture, the headquarters for administration of the department of Corse-du-Sud and the General Council. Construction occurred between 1826 and 1830, under a plan of the architect Alphonse de Gisors. It was listed as a historical monument on 30 January 1990.

== Location ==
Palais Lantivy lies in the centre of the town of Ajaccio, to the northwest of the Ajaccio Cathedral and southwest of Musée Fesch. At the end of the street it is situated on is the Place de Gaulle, which contains Eugène Viollet-le-Duc's statue of Napoleon Bonaparte as "a Roman emperor on horseback, surrounded by his four brothers".

== History ==
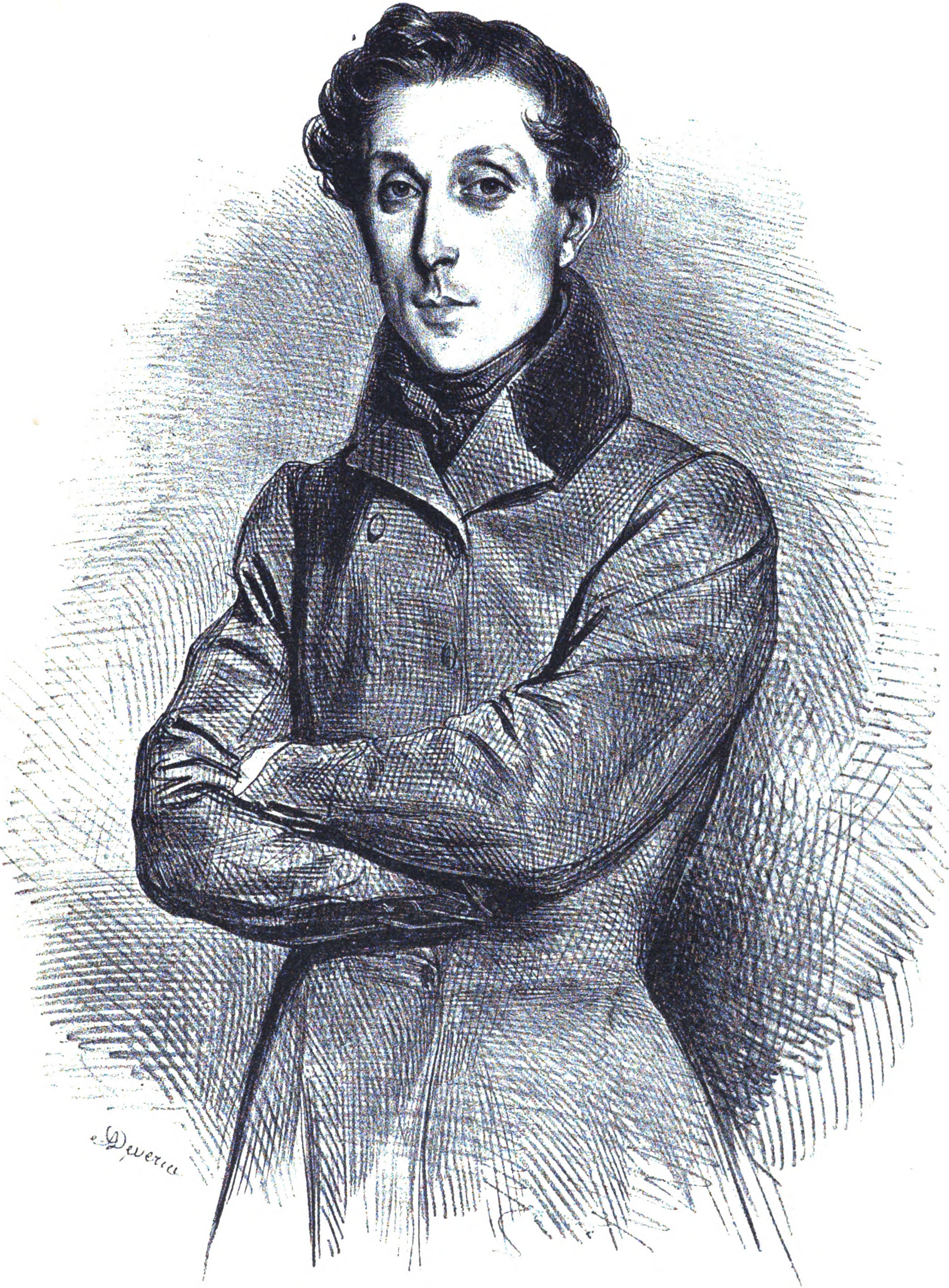
Alphonse de Gisors

The palace's construction under the Bourbon Restoration was part of a plan to develop the town where Napoleon Bonaparte was born. The building bears the name of the former Prefect of Corsica, Gabriel de Lantivy de Kerveno, the first French consul in Jerusalem. The building was authorized by a royal ordinance dated 25 September 1822, Construction occurred between 1826 and 1830, under a plan of the architect Alphonse de Gisors. Gisors drafted the architectural plans in 1824 and work began two years later by the engineer, Jouvin. Jouvin made changes to the original floor plans in 1829.

In May 1958, the leaders of the Committee of Public Safety occupied the palace as a mark of revolution and large crowds gathered there. The island's tax issues are administered at the Palais Lantivy. It was listed as a historical monument on 30 January 1990. During 2000–2002, the facade of the palace, the main hall, and the columned porch (peristyle) were refurbished. The roof was replaced in 2003. The original frescoes were restored in 2006.

== Features ==
Designed by Gisors in the neoclassical architectural style, the foundation stone for the palace was laid in 1826. It consists of a rectangular plan, two floors and a facade flanked by two wings. An atrium is situated in the middle of the palace. More recent additions include the east and west wings. A deliberation room above the entrance hall is reached by a staircase, while an adjacent room features a decorated ceiling and walls, also in the neoclassical style. An office contains an arch featuring a fresco of Aurora riding in a horse-drawn chariot. The prefect's apartments, a living room, dining area, and office, are on the building's west side and they overlook a garden. The building is surrounded by a well-tended garden with plants typical of the Mediterranean.

== Bibliography ==
- Benvenisti, Meron (8 November 1996). City of Stone: The Hidden History of Jerusalem. University of California Press. p. 19. ISBN 978-0-520-91868-9.
- Bradshaw (1887). Bradshaw's Monthly Continental Railway, Steam Transit, and General Guide, for Travellers Through Europe (Public domain ed.). Adams & Sons.
- Collectif, Collectif; Auzias, Dominique; Labourdette, Jean-Paul (29 January 2014). Corse 2014 Petit Futé (avec cartes, photos + avis des lecteurs) (in French). Petit Futé. ISBN 978-2-7469-7750-1.
- Ramsay, Robert (1983). The Corsican Time-bomb. Manchester University Press. p. 29. ISBN 978-0-7190-0893-1.
