= Santa-Maria-Siché =

Commune in Corsica, France

- Commune
- Location of Santa-Maria-Siché
- Location within France Location within Corsica
- Coordinates: 41°52′37″N 8°58′44″E
- Country: France
- Region: Corsica
- Department: Corse-du-Sud
- Arrondissement: Ajaccio
- Canton: Taravo-Ornano

Government
  - Mayor (2020–2026): Guillaume Guglielmi
- Area^{1}: 10.67 km^{2} (4.12 sq mi)
- Elevation: 500 m (1,600 ft)
- Highest elevation: 1,240 m (4,070 ft)
- Lowest elevation: 390 m (1,280 ft)
- Population (2023): 364
  - Density: 34.1/km^{2} (88.4/sq mi)
- Time zone: UTC+01:00 (CET)
  - Summer (DST): UTC+02:00 (CEST)
- INSEE/Postal code: 2A312 /20190
- ^{1} French Land Register data, which excludes lakes, ponds, glaciers > 1 km^{2} (0.386 sq mi or 247 acres) and river estuaries.

Santa-Maria-Siché (Corsican: Santa Marìa d’Urnanu) is a commune in the Corse-du-Sud department of France on the island of Corsica.

== Population ==
Historical population
Year	Pop.	±% p.a.
1968	537	—
1975	461	−2.16%
1982	439	−0.70%
1990	355	−2.62%
1999	357	+0.06%
2007	373	+0.55%
2012	470	+4.73%
2017	439	−1.36%
2023	364	−3.07%
Source: INSEE

== See also ==
- Communes of the Corse-du-Sud department
