= Pianottoli-Caldarello =

Commune in Corsica, France

Pianottoli-Caldarello Pianottuli Caldareddu
- Commune
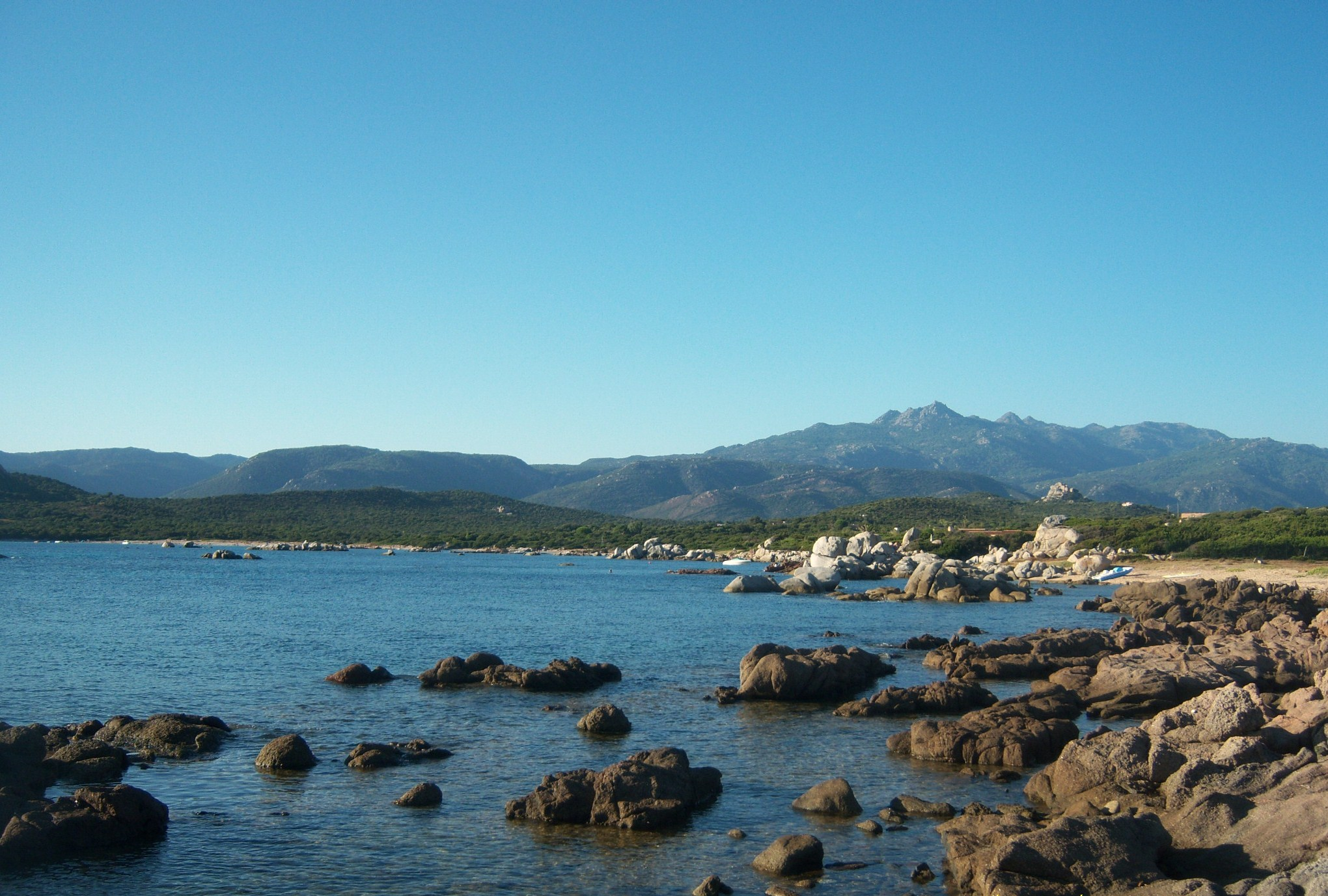
- Anse de Chevanu
- Location of Pianottoli-Caldarello
- Location within France Location within Corsica
- Coordinates: 41°29′05″N 9°03′38″E
- Country: France
- Region: Corsica
- Department: Corse-du-Sud
- Arrondissement: Sartène
- Canton: Grand Sud

Government
  - Mayor (2020–2026): Charles Henri Bianconi
- Area^{1}: 43 km^{2} (17 sq mi)
- Elevation: 80 m (260 ft)
- Highest elevation: 1,321 m (4,334 ft)
- Lowest elevation: 0 m (0 ft)
- Population (2023): 749
  - Density: 17/km^{2} (45/sq mi)
- Time zone: UTC+01:00 (CET)
  - Summer (DST): UTC+02:00 (CEST)
- INSEE/Postal code: 2A215 /20131
- ^{1} French Land Register data, which excludes lakes, ponds, glaciers > 1 km^{2} (0.386 sq mi or 247 acres) and river estuaries.

Pianottoli-Caldarello (Italian pronunciation: [pjaˈnɔttoli kaldaˈrɛllo]; French: [pjanɔtɔli kaldaʁɛlo]; Corsican: Pianottuli è Caldareddu) is a commune in the Corse-du-Sud department of France on the island of Corsica.

It is part of the canton of Grand Sud.

== Geography ==
Pianottoli-Caldarello is 9 kilometres (6 mi) to the west of the commune of Figari on the road to Sartène. Originally named Caldarello, it was detached from Zérubia in 1864 then changed its name in 1921. The commune comprises predominantly shoreline with the Bay of Figari to the east, Point Capineru, the small islands of Bruzzi (a nature reserve) and two deep coves (Chevanu and Arbitru). A small port is developing near Caldarello to the east. The rocky hinterland extends in the direction of Mount Cagna to the north, going up to 1,340 metres (4,400 ft) on Ovace; for a long tome it served as pasturage for Zérubia, and is still used for that purpose.

== Population ==
Historical population
| Year | Pop. | ±% p.a. |
|---|---|---|
| 1968 | 310 | — |
| 1975 | 794 | +14.38% |
| 1982 | 889 | +1.63% |
| 1990 | 653 | −3.78% |
| 1999 | 729 | +1.23% |
| 2007 | 834 | +1.70% |
| 2012 | 934 | +2.29% |
| 2017 | 912 | −0.48% |
| 2023 | 749 | −3.23% |
Source: INSEE

== Sights ==
- Torra di Caldarellu

== See also ==
- Communes of the Corse-du-Sud department
