= Zonza =

Commune in Corsica, France

- Commune
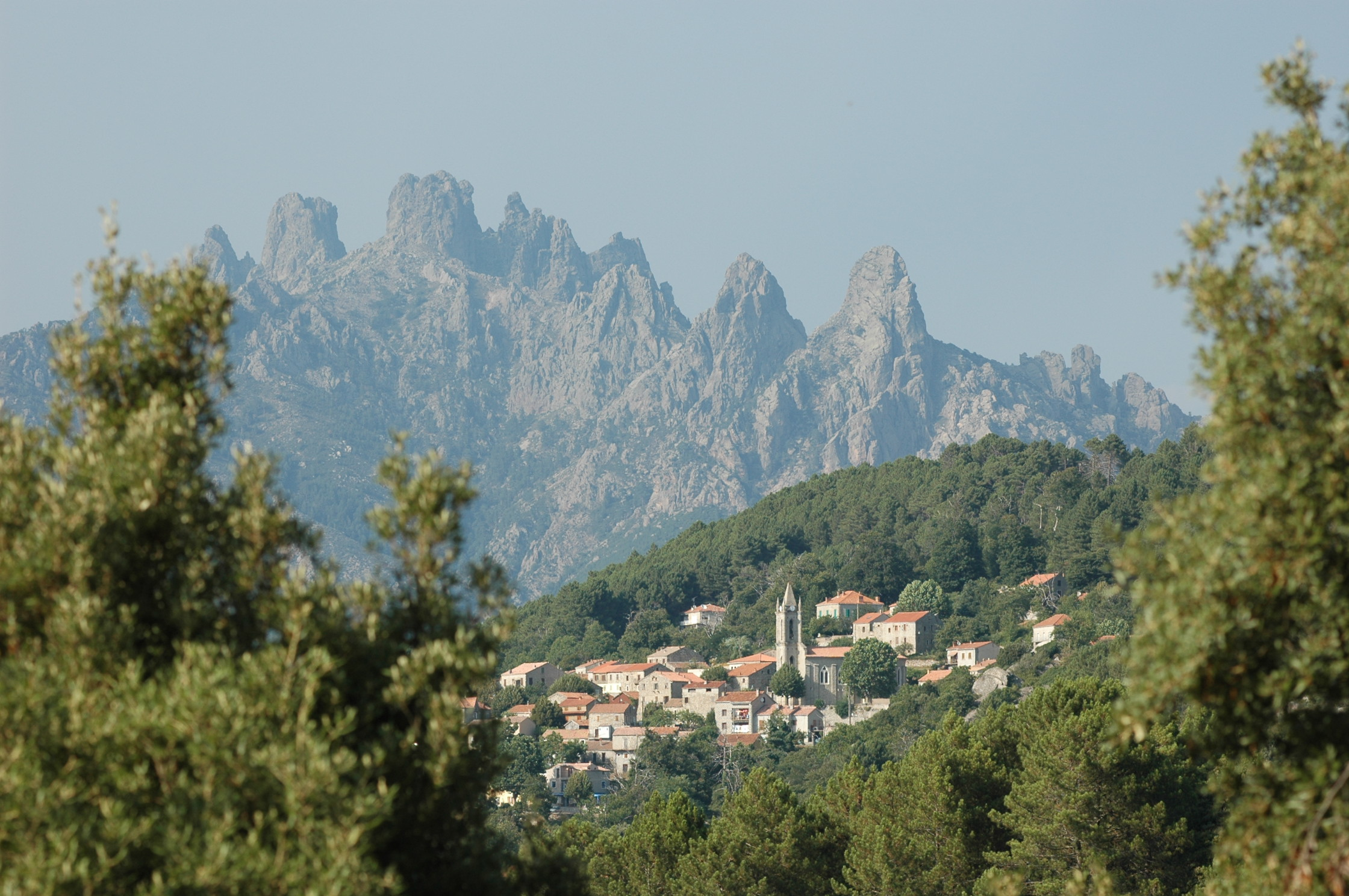
- Aiguilles Bavella
- Location of Zonza
- Location within France Location within Corsica
- Coordinates: 41°45′01″N 9°10′16″E
- Country: France
- Region: Corsica
- Department: Corse-du-Sud
- Arrondissement: Sartène
- Canton: Bavella
- Intercommunality: Alta Rocca

Government
  - Mayor (2020–2026): Nicolas Cucchi
- Area^{1}: 134.46 km^{2} (51.92 sq mi)
- Elevation: 762 m (2,500 ft)
- Highest elevation: 1,480 m (4,860 ft)
- Lowest elevation: 0 m (0 ft)
- Population (2023): 2,989
  - Density: 22.23/km^{2} (57.57/sq mi)
- Demonym(s): Zonzais, Zonzaises
- Time zone: UTC+01:00 (CET)
  - Summer (DST): UTC+02:00 (CEST)
- INSEE/Postal code: 2A362 /20124
- ^{1} French Land Register data, which excludes lakes, ponds, glaciers > 1 km^{2} (0.386 sq mi or 247 acres) and river estuaries.

Zonza (French pronunciation: [tsɔ̃ts(a)]; Corsican pronunciation: [ˈdzɔndza]) is a commune in the Corse-du-Sud department of France on the island of Corsica.

== Geography ==
Zonza is located in the mountain chain of Barocagio-Marghese which extends to the south of the Incudine massif. This mountainous area extends 20 km from west to east from the village of Zonza to the Tyrrhenian Sea and 12 km from north to south from the Bavella pass to Mount Rossu.

The village is situated in the Rizzansee river valley on the mountainside opposite Quenza on the D268 road which connects Bavella to Levie.

To the east, the hamlet of Sainte-Lucie-de-Porto-Vecchio is the centre of a coastal area which is irrigated by the Cavu river. No communication road exists between these two parts of the commune. To travel from Zonza Village to St. Lucia, a distance of 17 km as the crow flies, the Zonza massif must be circled to the south and Ospedale forest passed through. This route is about 50 km and takes over an hour.

== History ==
On 29 November 1993, waters of the coastal Cavu river rose by ten times in the space of half an hour causing rocks, trees, telephone poles to slide down the hill and flooding all the houses on its banks. Taglio Rosso in Sainte-Lucie-de-Porto-Vecchio became isolated from the rest of the area.

This flood occurred at the same time as that of the Solenzara river which has its mouth at the town of the same name. Mudslides occurred in almost all of the Sartène arrondissement, from Propriano to Porto-Vecchio.

== Sites and monuments ==
=== Sainte-Lucie-de-Porto-Vecchio ===
Sainte-Lucie-de-Porto-Vecchio (Corsican: Santa-Lucia-di-Portivechju) is located on Route nationale 198 on the east coast, between Sari-Solenzara and Porto-Vecchio. The D168A, to the east, leads to the coast and to the village of Pinarello, 3 km away. To the west, the D168 follows the Cavo river and leads to Conca, a village 5 km away.

An annex to the town hall is on the D168a towards Pinarello. The village has shops including a supermarket, a doctor's surgery, a pharmacy, a petrol station and a bookshop. The village also offers a variety of holiday accommodation, including hotels, campsites and other locations.

=== Other hamlets ===
3 km to the east, the village of Pinarello (Corsican: golfe de Pinarellu), a small fishing port and marina, boasts a magnificent white sand beach that runs along a 10ha pine forest. A road which subsequently becomes a path leads along the Cavo river to the west.

== Population ==
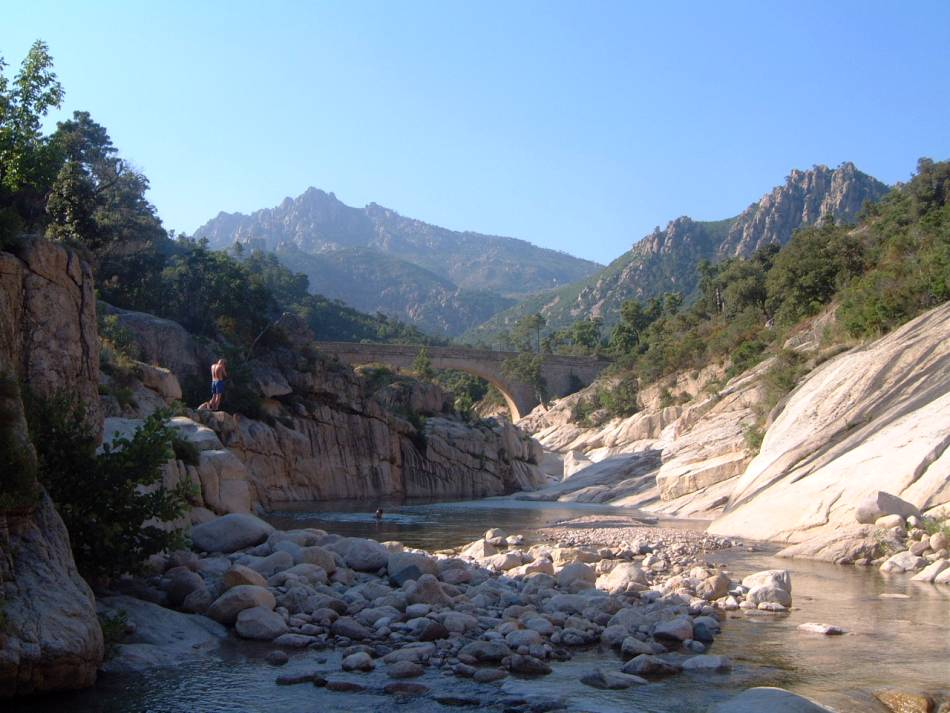
The river Cavo

Historical population

| Year | Pop. | ±% p.a. |
|---|---|---|
| 1800 | 407 | — |
| 1806 | 395 | −0.50% |
| 1821 | 390 | −0.08% |
| 1831 | 480 | +2.10% |
| 1836 | 512 | +1.30% |
| 1841 | 585 | +2.70% |
| 1846 | 723 | +4.33% |
| 1851 | 603 | −3.56% |
| 1856 | 627 | +0.78% |
| 1861 | 754 | +3.76% |
| 1866 | 873 | +2.97% |
| 1872 | 909 | +0.68% |
| 1876 | 1,003 | +2.49% |
| 1881 | 1,022 | +0.38% |
| 1886 | 1,270 | +4.44% |
| 1891 | 1,200 | −1.13% |
| 1896 | 1,316 | +1.86% |
| 1901 | 1,511 | +2.80% |

| Year | Pop. | ±% p.a. |
|---|---|---|
| 1906 | 1,718 | +2.60% |
| 1911 | 1,815 | +1.10% |
| 1921 | 1,714 | −0.57% |
| 1926 | 1,670 | −0.52% |
| 1931 | 1,624 | −0.56% |
| 1936 | 1,814 | +2.24% |
| 1946 | 1,613 | −1.17% |
| 1954 | 1,075 | −4.95% |
| 1962 | 727 | −4.77% |
| 1968 | 835 | +2.34% |
| 1975 | 1,214 | +5.49% |
| 1982 | 1,503 | +3.10% |
| 1990 | 1,600 | +0.78% |
| 1999 | 1,802 | +1.33% |
| 2007 | 2,179 | +2.40% |
| 2012 | 2,482 | +2.64% |
| 2017 | 2,722 | +1.86% |
| 2023 | 2,989 | +1.57% |

Source: EHESS and INSEE

== See also ==
- Tour de Fautea
- Tour de Pinarellu
- Communes of the Corse-du-Sud department
