= Railway stations in Corsica =

The railways in Corsica (part of France) are metre gauge and are operated by Chemins de fer de la Corse. A list of stations follows.

== Open ==
- Calvi - terminus in northwest.
- Calenzana
- Algajola
- L'Ille-Rousse
- Le Regino
- Belgodere
- Palasca
- Novella
- Pietralba
- Ponte-Leccia - junction in midlands
- Francardo
- Omessa
- Soveria
- Corte
- Poggio-Riventosa
- Venaco
- Vecchio
- Vivario
- Tattone
- Vizzavona
- Bocognano
- Tavera
- Ucciani
- Carbuccia
- Mezzana
- Caldaniccia - stillborn junction to Propriano
- Campo-dell'Oro
- Ajaccio - terminus and capital in southwest

- Ponte-Leccia - junction in midlands
- Ponte-Nuovo
- Barchetta
- Ponte-Nuovo
- Casamozza - former junction on east coast
- Lucciana
- Borgo
- Biguglia
- Furiani
- Lupino, Corsica
- Bastia - terminus in northeast

== Closed ==
- Casamozza - former junction on east coast
- Arena-Vescovato
- St. Pancrace
- Folelli-Orezza
- Moriani-Orezza
- Prunete-Cervione
- Alistro
- Bravone
- Tallone
- Pont-du-Tavignano
- Aleria
- Puzzichella
- Ghisonaccia
- Prunelli-Pietrapola
- Cavone, Corsica
- Pont-du-Travo-Ventiseri
- Solaro
- Solenzo
- Favone
- Figa
- Ste.Lucie-Conca
- Lecci
- Torre
- Porto-Vecchio - closed terminus in southeast; cancelled extension to Bonifacio

== Never Built ==
- Caldaniccia - cancelled junction
- Propriano - cancelled terminus in southeast
- Porto-Vecchio - cancelled junction
- Bonifacio - cancelled terminus in southeast

== See also ==
- List of never used railways
