= Torra di Pinareddu =

Genoese coastal defence tower in Corsica

Tower of Pinareddu
- Torra di Pinareddu (Corsican)
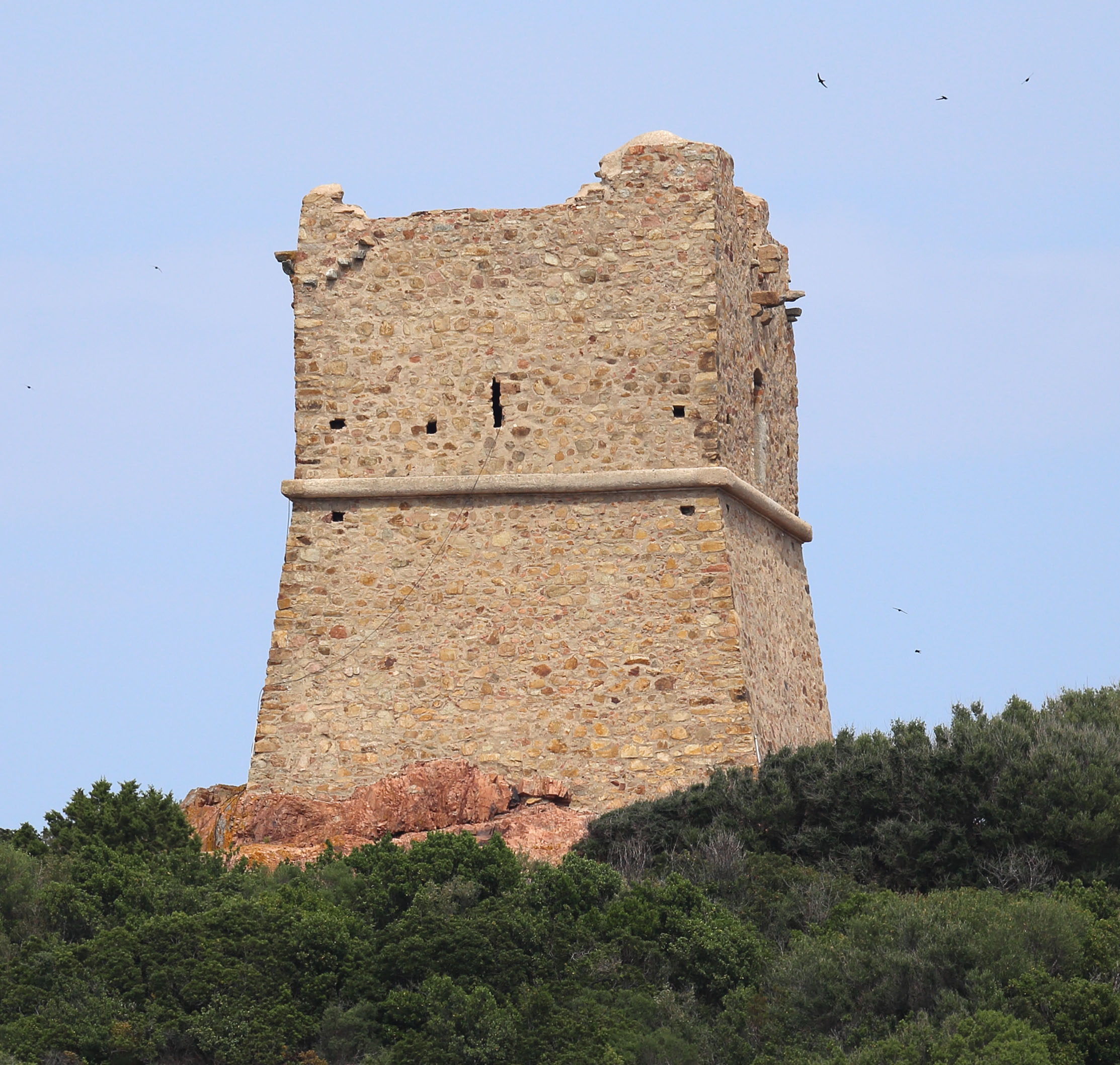

- Location within Corsica
- 41°40′14″N 9°23′33″E

Monument historique
- Designated: 4 August 1992
- Reference no.: PA00099147

The Tower of Pinareddu (Corsican: Torra di Pinareddu) is a Genoese tower located in the commune of Zonza (Corse-du-Sud) on the east coast of the Corsica. The tower sits at an elevation of 52 metres (171 ft) on the Île de Pinarellu.

The tower was built in around 1595. It was one of a series of coastal defences constructed by the Republic of Genoa between 1530 and 1620 to stem the attacks by Barbary pirates. Genoese documents refer to the Île de Pinarellu as the Isola dei Corsi or the Island of the Corsaires. The design of the Tower of Pinareddu is unusual in that the plan is square rather than round. The tower is 13 metres (43 ft) in height and each side at the base is 9.5 metres (31 ft) reducing to 8 metres (26 ft) at the string course. The tower was attacked by the Ottoman Turks and burned in 1650.

Since 1981 the Tower of Pinareddu has been owned and maintained by the French government agency, the Conservatoire du littoral. Restoration work was carried out in 1994. The agency has acquired the 19 hectares (47 acres) of the island. In 1992 the tower was listed as one of the official historical monuments of France.

== See also ==
- List of Genoese towers in Corsica
