= Étang de Crovani =

- Stagnu di Crovani (Corsican)
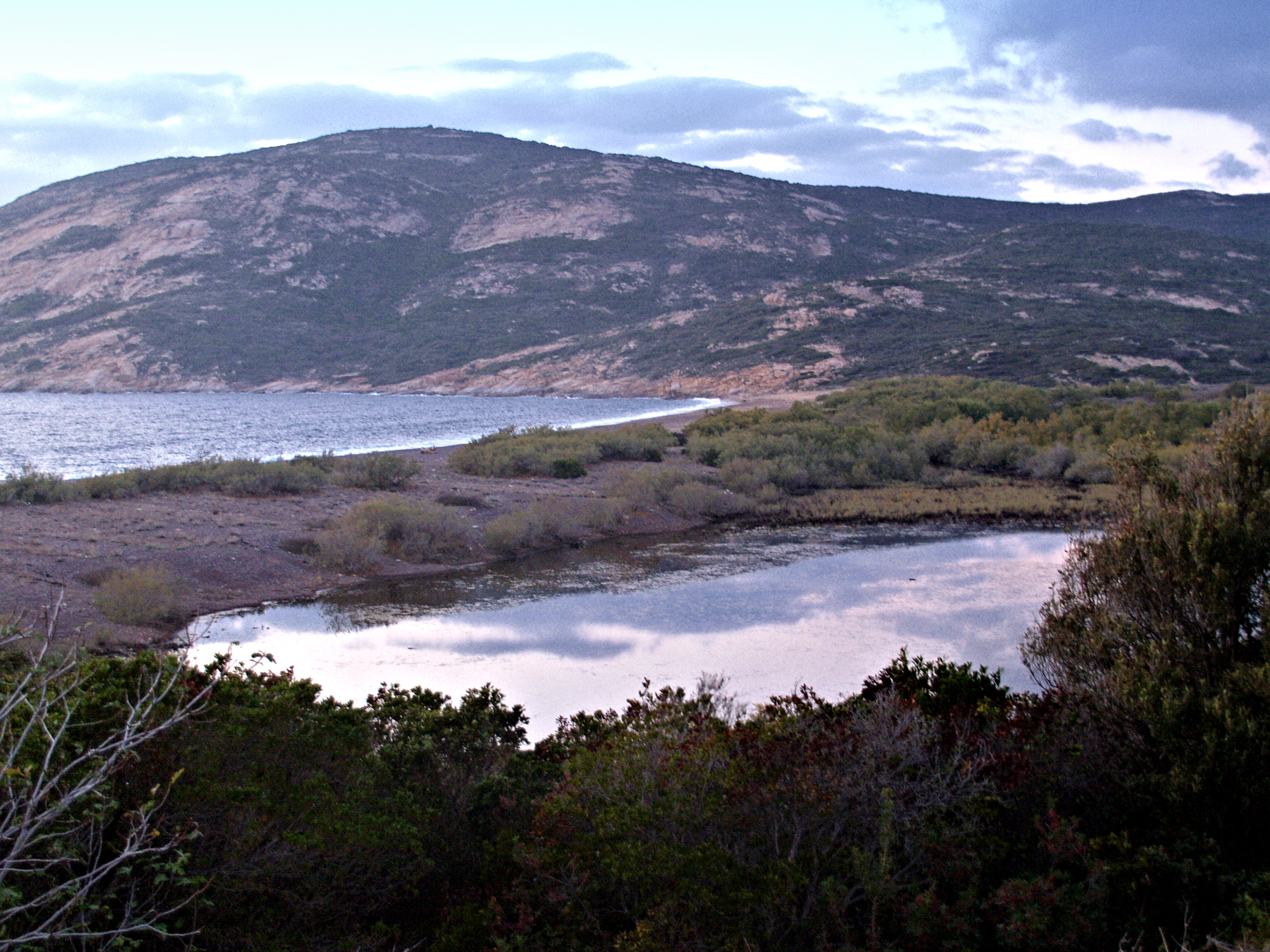
- Étang de Crovani at Argentella

- Location within Corsica Location within France
- Coordinates: 42°28′22″N 8°40′51″E
- Type: Lagoon
- Basin countries: Corsica, France

The Étang de Crovani (Note: Étang may be translated as "pond" or "lagoon".) (Corsican: Stagnu di Diana) is a coastal lagoon beside the Mediterranean Sea on the west coast of the Haute-Corse department on the French island of Corsica.

== Location ==
The Étang de Crovani is on the west coast of Haute-Corse in the commune of Calenzana to the east of the Baie de Crovani. It is a permanent body of water separated from the sea by a bank of pebbles and gravel. The lagoon is behind the center of the Crovani beach (or Argentella beach), a beach of small pebbles more than 1 kilometre (0.62 mi) long, which is known for its natural beauty but is rarely visited by tourists. It is north of the village of L'Argentella and west of the D81b road, which leads to the village of Vignaccia.

The lagoon and surrounding marshes cover 52.95 hectares (130.8 acres). Altitude ranges from 0 to 19 metres (0 to 62 ft). The main tributary is the 6.15 kilometres (3.82 mi) Ruisseau de Marconcellu.

== Ecology ==
The site is owned by the Conservatoire du littoral. It is classified as a Zone naturelle d'intérêt écologique, faunistique et floristique (ZNIEFF) Continentale de type 1.

The lagoon is surrounded by a belt of tamarix trees and some grasslands dominated by bulrushes and rushes. The coastal barrier has a dense mosaic of mastic (Pistacia lentiscus) trees. It does not attract many birds due to its small size, but could be used as a stopover by migrating birds or as a wintering place in very cold winters. The Köppen climate classification is Csb : Warm-summer Mediterranean climate.

== Sources ==
- "Étang de Crovani, Département de la Haute-Corse, Corse, France", Mindat
- Étang et zones humide de Crovani (PDF) (in French), Paris: INPN, SPN-MNHN
- "Plage de l'Argentella - Crovani à Calenzana", plages.tv (in French)
- Ruisseau de Marconcellu (in French), Sandre
- "Way: Étang de Crovani (30797813)", OpenStreetMap
- ZNIEFF 940004139 Étang et zones humide de Crovani (in French), Inventaire national du patrimoine naturel (INPN)
