= Aiguilles de Bavella =

Mountain range in Corsica, France

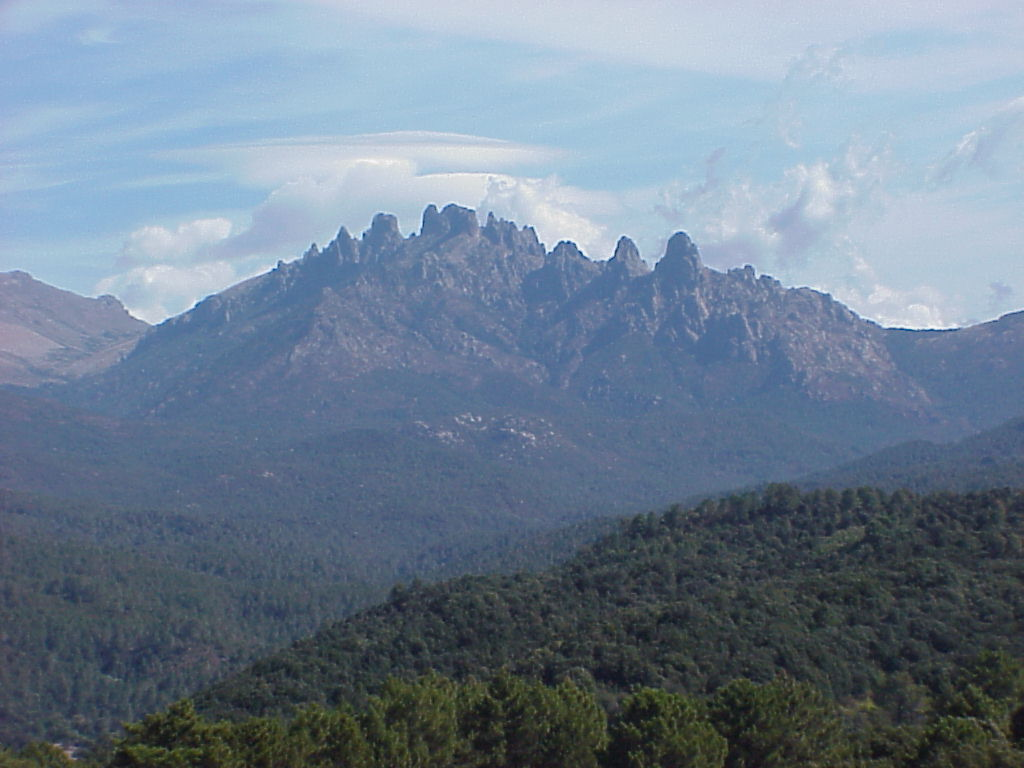
- "Aiguilles de Bavella" view

Highest point
- Elevation: 1,855 m (6,086 ft)
- Coordinates: 41°47′59″N 9°12′53″E

Geography
- Location within Corsica Location within France
- Location: Corse-du-Sud, France
- Parent range: Corse

The Aiguilles de Bavella (Corsican: I Forchi di Bavedda; Needles of Bavella) are rocky spikes of red granite that dominate the hill of the same name on the island of Corsica in France. At 1218 m, the hill connects the Alta Rocca to the east coast of Corsica. This massif is smaller yet much more popular than the "aiguilles de Popolasca". The site is characterized by jagged peaks, large rock walls and pine trees twisted by the wind. It is a popular spot for hiking and rock climbing.

Located in the centre of the "Massif de Bavella", are the seven "tours d'Asinau," or towers of Asinau, the actual "needles". These are traditionally numbered from south to north:

1. Punta di l'Acellu (Punta ll'Aceddu, 1588 m)
2. Punta di l'Ariettu (Punta ll'Arghjetu, 1591 m)
3. Punta di a Vacca (Punta lla Vacca, 1611 m), the only tower accessible to a simple hiker
4. Punta di u Pargulu (Punta llu Pàrgulu, 1785 m), separated from the previous towers by the Bocca di u Pargulu (1662 m), taken by the Alpine variant of the GR 20
5. Punta Longa (1836 m)
6. Punta Alta (1855 m), the highest
7. Punta Iolla (1848 m), separated from the Punta Alta by the Bocca di u Santu (1745 m)

The highest points of the Bavella massif stand a little to the north of the Needles with both Punta di u Furnellu (Punta llu Furneddu) and Punta Muvrareccia (A Mufrareccia) at 1899m. The massif is overshadowed by the highest peak in the region, Monte Incudine (2134 m). It extends from the forest of Tova and the town of Solaro to the 1381m Monte Calva to the south, the edges of the Massif de l'Ospedale, and almost to Conca and the sea in the east. It also acts as the basin for the river Solenzara, the traditional boundary between Corsica's northern and southern sections.

== Hiking trails ==
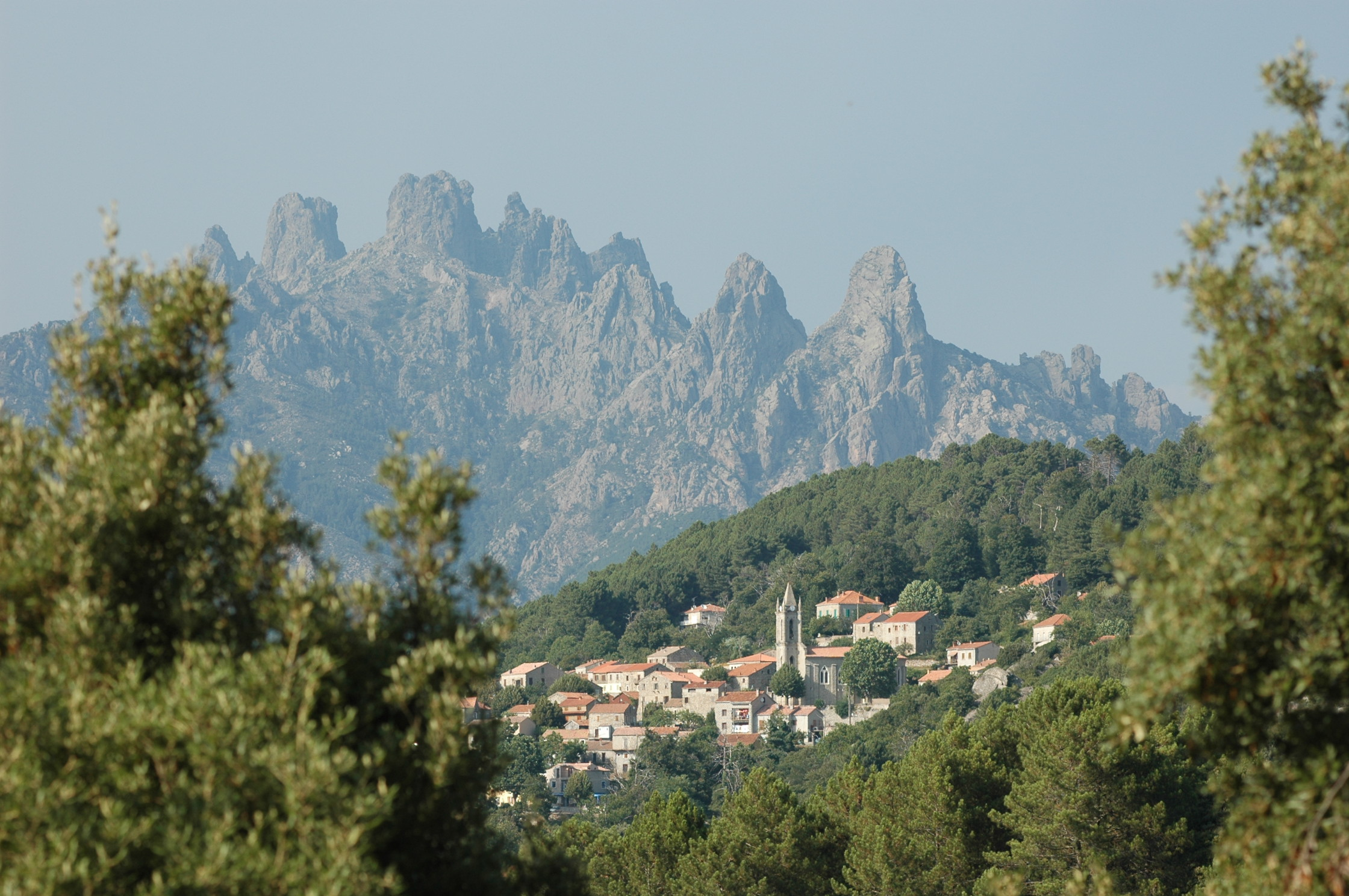
Zonza and the "Aiguilles de Bavella"

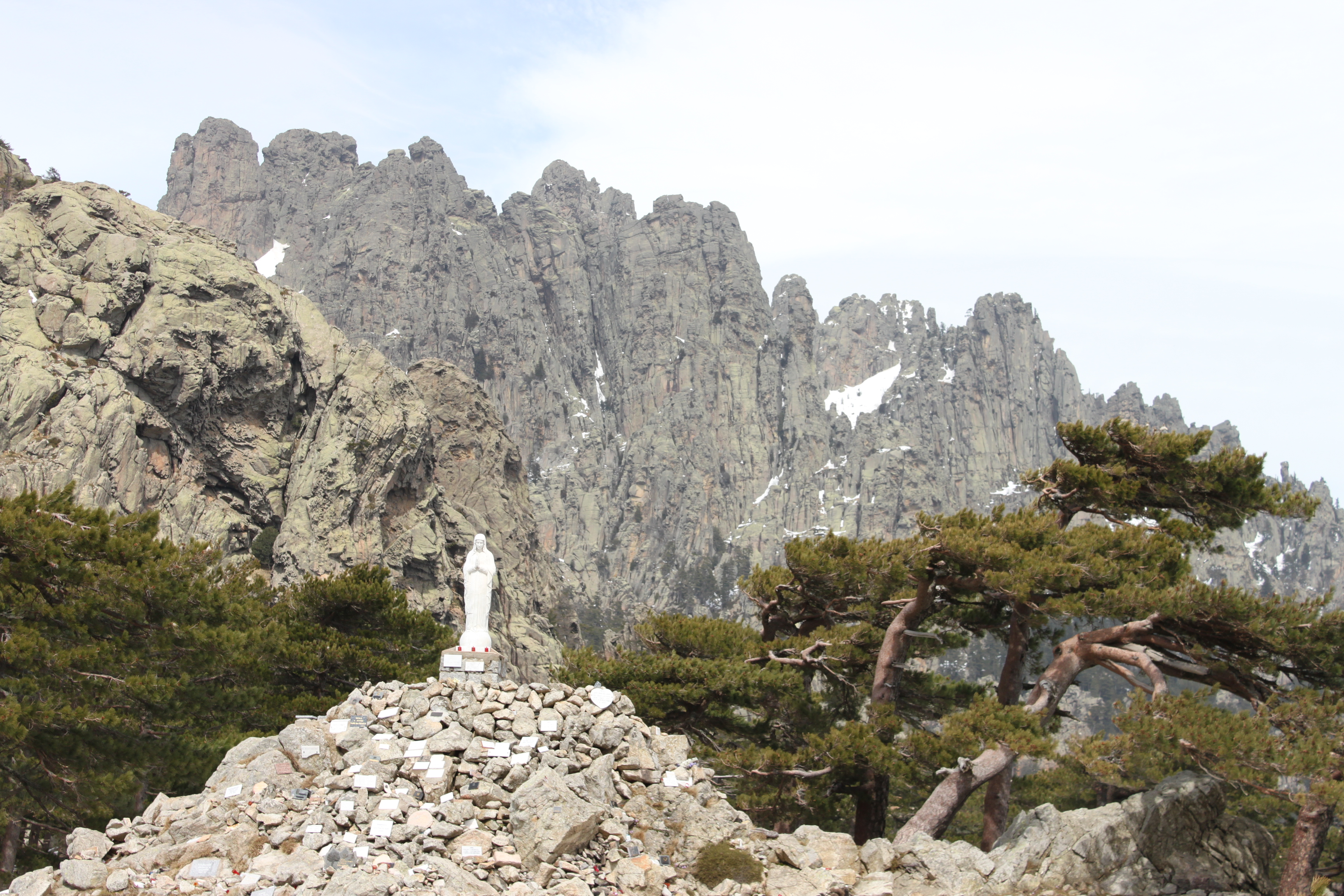
"Aiguilles de Bavella" and a statue of "Notre Dame des Neiges".

From Mount Incudine to the Bavella Pass, the GR 20 footpath, after reaching the refuge of Asinau at 1536m, passes by the foot of the aiguilles de Bavella in the Rizzanese valley (Asinau), but a so-called "alpine variant" route allows the towers of Bavella to be reached via the Bocca di u Pargulu (Bocca llu Pàrgulu, 1662 m).

After the Bavella pass, the path begins its descent towards Conca, via "Foce Finosa" (1206 m) and the i Paliri refuge (1055 m) at the foot of the Punta Tafunata (literally "Pierced Peak"), a 1312 m high mountain with a hole.

A statue of Notre-Dame-des-Neiges ("Our Lady of the Snows") stands at the pass, a few meters from the road, on top of a large mound of boulders. The pass, known as Col de Bavella or the Village de Bavella, has a couple of restaurants with accommodation available. The Purcaraccia is a famous creek with waterfalls and natural pools. The trail starts about 8 km from there on the D268 towards Sari-Solenzara.

The towns of Quenza, Zonza and Conca stand in a curve to the southwest of the Bavella Pass.
