= Ajaccio station =

Railway station in Ajaccio, France

Coordinates: 41°55′39″N 8°44′21″E

Ajaccio
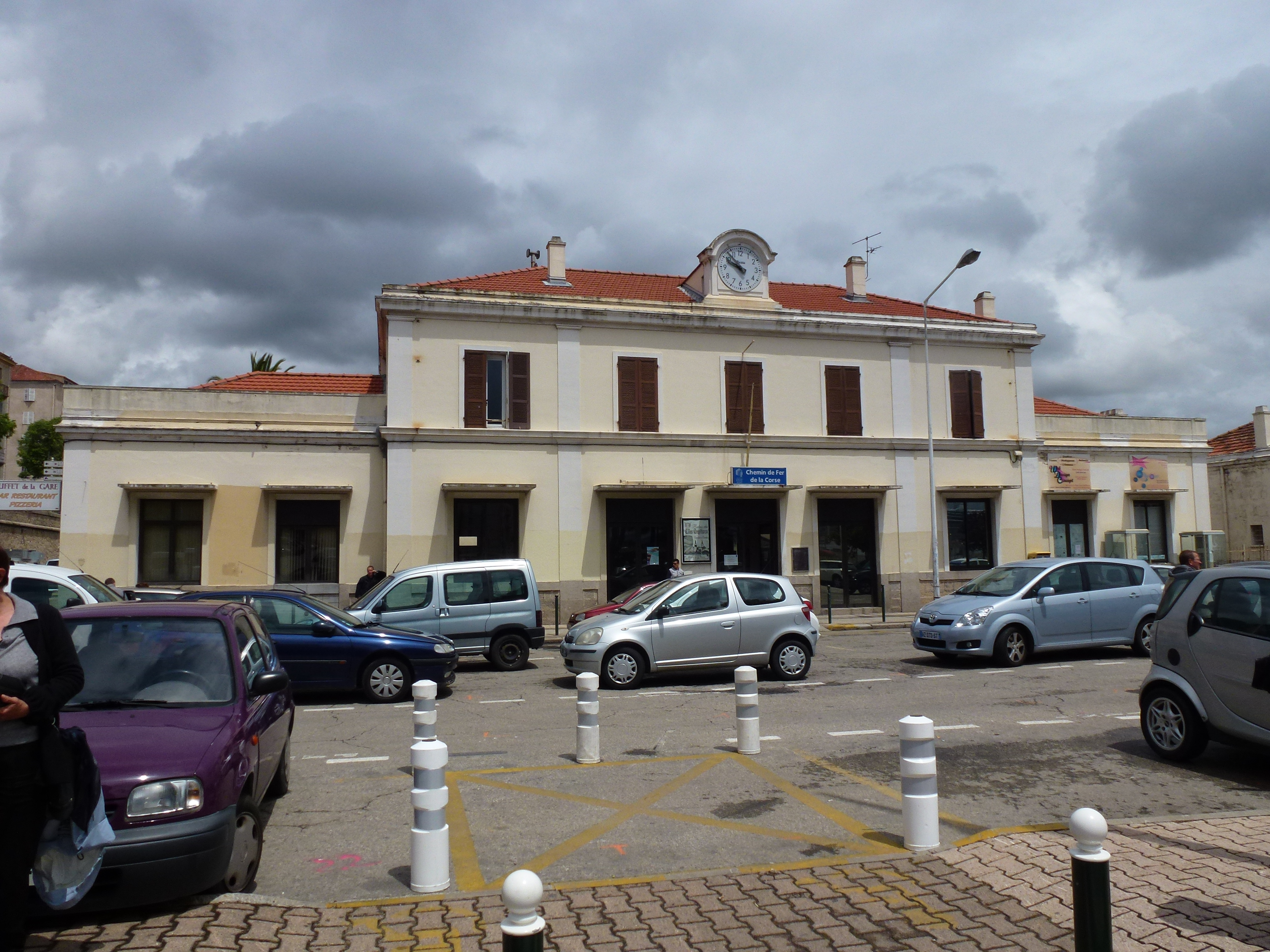

General information
- Location: Place de la gare 20000 Ajaccio; Corse-du-Sud; France
- Elevation: 4 metres (13 ft)
- Platforms: 2
- Tracks: 3

History
- Opened: 1 December 1888

Services
Preceding station	CFC	Following station
Terminus	Ajaccio–Bastia	Les Salines towards Bastia
Location

Ajaccio station (French: Gare d'Ajaccio, Corsican: Stazione di Aiacciu) is a French railway station serving the town of Ajaccio, Corse-du-Sud department, southeastern France. It is served by trains towards Bastia and Mezzana.

== See also ==
- Railway stations in Corsica
