= Omessa =

- Commune
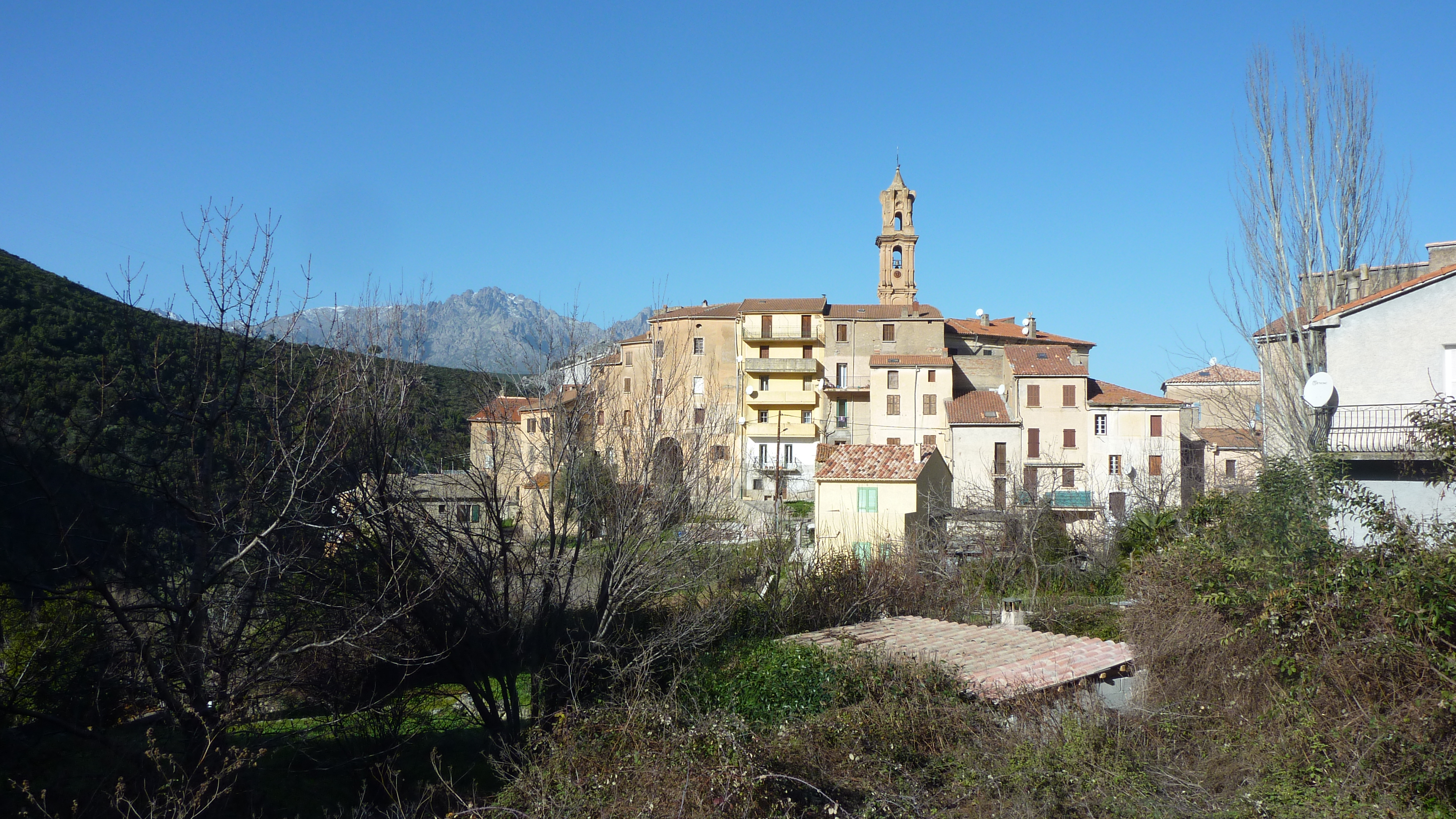
- The village of Omessa
- Location of Omessa
- Location within France Location within Corsica
- Coordinates: 42°22′16″N 9°12′39″E
- Country: France
- Region: Corsica
- Department: Haute-Corse
- Arrondissement: Corte
- Canton: Golo-Morosaglia

Government
  - Mayor (2020–2026): Jean-François Filippi
- Area^{1}: 24.4 km^{2} (9.4 sq mi)
- Elevation: 450 m (1,480 ft)
- Highest elevation: 1,335 m (4,380 ft)
- Lowest elevation: 239 m (784 ft)
- Population (2023): 595
  - Density: 24.4/km^{2} (63.2/sq mi)
- Time zone: UTC+01:00 (CET)
  - Summer (DST): UTC+02:00 (CEST)
- INSEE/Postal code: 2B193 /20236
- ^{1} French Land Register data, which excludes lakes, ponds, glaciers > 1 km^{2} (0.386 sq mi or 247 acres) and river estuaries.

Omessa (French pronunciation: [ɔmɛsa]) is a commune in the Haute-Corse department of France on the island of Corsica.

== Population ==
Historical population
Year	Pop.	±% p.a.
1968	634	—
1975	634	+0.00%
1982	509	−3.09%
1990	517	+0.20%
1999	537	+0.42%
2007	579	+0.95%
2012	536	−1.53%
2017	587	+1.83%
2023	595	+0.23%
Source: INSEE

== Transport ==
The town is served by a station on the Corsican Railways.

== See also ==
- Communes of the Haute-Corse department
