= Soveria =

- Commune
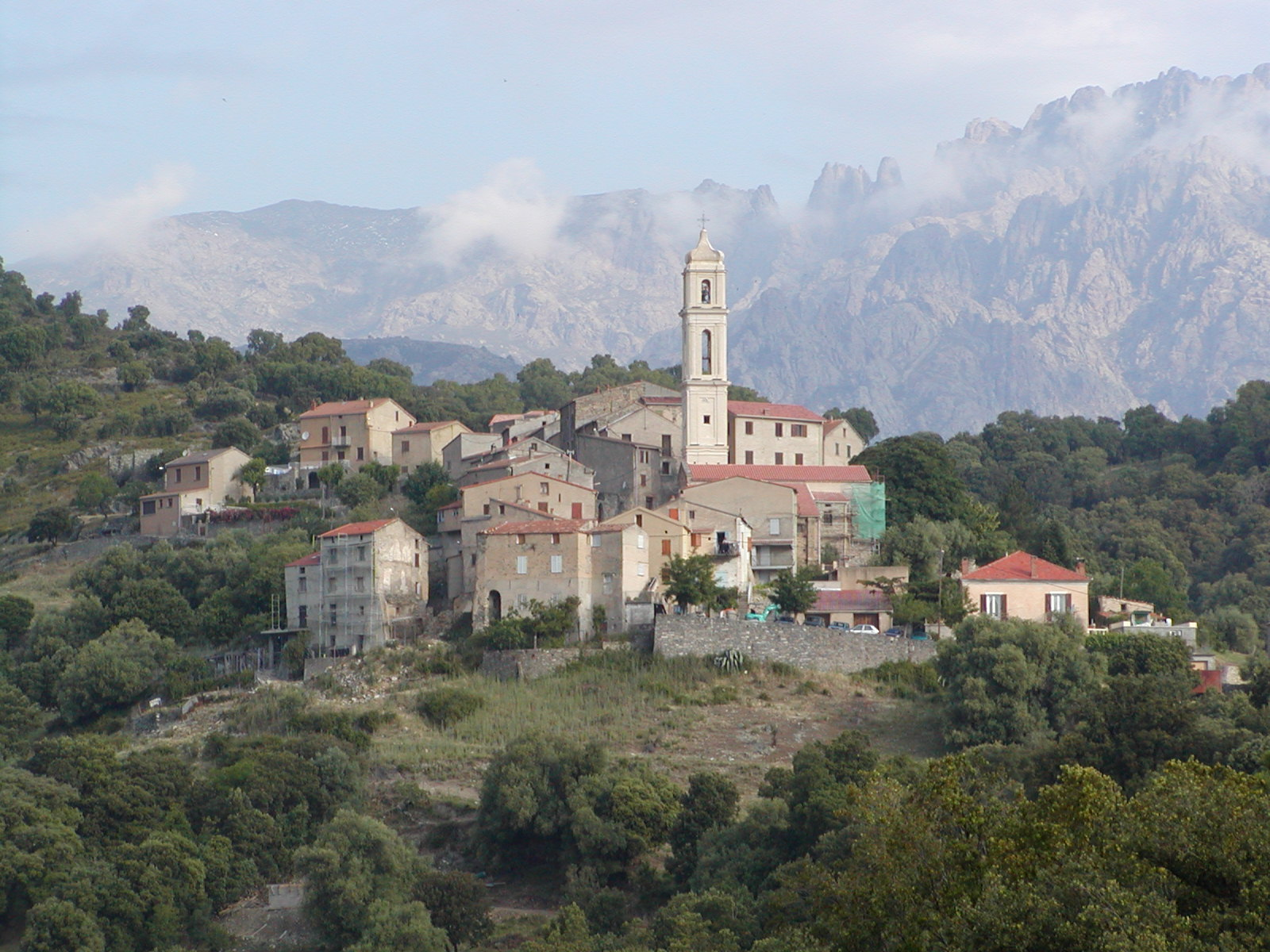
- The church and surrounding buildings, in Soveria
- Location of Soveria
- Location within France Location within Corsica
- Coordinates: 42°21′37″N 9°09′53″E
- Country: France
- Region: Corsica
- Department: Haute-Corse
- Arrondissement: Corte
- Canton: Golo-Morosaglia

Government
  - Mayor (2020–2026): Alexandre Rossi
- Area^{1}: 11.73 km^{2} (4.53 sq mi)
- Elevation: 550 m (1,800 ft)
- Highest elevation: 1,951 m (6,401 ft)
- Lowest elevation: 400 m (1,300 ft)
- Population (2023): 109
  - Density: 9.29/km^{2} (24.1/sq mi)
- Time zone: UTC+01:00 (CET)
  - Summer (DST): UTC+02:00 (CEST)
- INSEE/Postal code: 2B289 /20250
- ^{1} French Land Register data, which excludes lakes, ponds, glaciers > 1 km^{2} (0.386 sq mi or 247 acres) and river estuaries.

Soveria is a commune in the Haute-Corse department of France on the island of Corsica.

== Population ==
Historical population
Year	Pop.	±% p.a.
1968	70	—
1975	55	−3.39%
1982	55	+0.00%
1990	59	+0.88%
1999	68	+1.59%
2007	106	+5.71%
2012	120	+2.51%
2017	117	−0.51%
2023	109	−1.17%
Source: INSEE

== Transport ==
The town is served by a station on the Corsican Railways.

== See also ==
- Communes of the Haute-Corse department
