= Canton of Bavella =

Coordinates: 41.49°N 9.28°E

The canton of Bavella is an administrative division of the Corse-du-Sud department, southeastern France. It was created at the French canton reorganisation which came into effect in March 2015. Its seat is in Porto-Vecchio.

It consists of the following communes:

- Conca
- Lecci
- Porto-Vecchio (partly)
- San-Gavino-di-Carbini
- Sari-Solenzara
- Zonza
