= San-Gavino-di-Carbini =

Commune in Corsica, France

- Commune
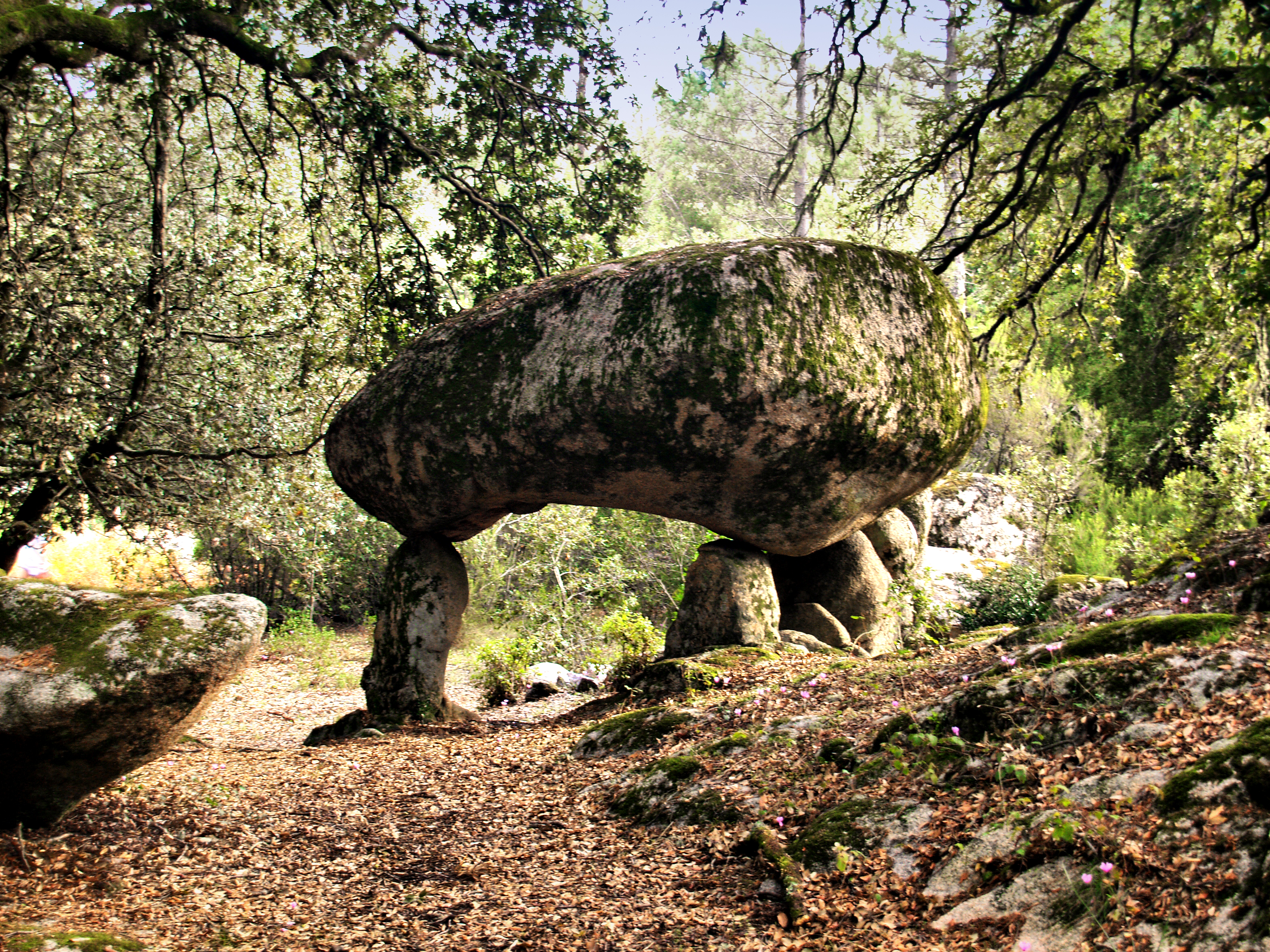
- A dolmen in San-Gavino-di-Carbini
- Location of San-Gavino-di-Carbini
- Location within France Location within Corsica
- Coordinates: 41°43′21″N 9°08′54″E
- Country: France
- Region: Corsica
- Department: Corse-du-Sud
- Arrondissement: Sartène
- Canton: Bavella
- Intercommunality: l'Alta Rocca

Government
  - Mayor (2020–2026): Bernard Jean-Marie Balesi
- Area^{1}: 47.88 km^{2} (18.49 sq mi)
- Elevation: 697 m (2,287 ft)
- Highest elevation: 1,227 m (4,026 ft)
- Lowest elevation: 36 m (118 ft)
- Population (2023): 1,204
  - Density: 25.15/km^{2} (65.13/sq mi)
- Time zone: UTC+01:00 (CET)
  - Summer (DST): UTC+02:00 (CEST)
- INSEE/Postal code: 2A300 /20170
- ^{1} French Land Register data, which excludes lakes, ponds, glaciers > 1 km^{2} (0.386 sq mi or 247 acres) and river estuaries.

San-Gavino-di-Carbini is a commune in the Corse-du-Sud department of France on the island of Corsica.

== Population ==
Historical population
Year	Pop.	±% p.a.
1968	301	—
1975	266	−1.75%
1982	381	+5.27%
1990	538	+4.41%
1999	738	+3.57%
2007	991	+3.75%
2012	1,061	+1.37%
2017	1,110	+0.91%
2023	1,204	+1.36%
Source: INSEE

== See also ==
- Communes of the Corse-du-Sud department
