= Sari-Solenzara =

Commune in Corsica, France

- Commune
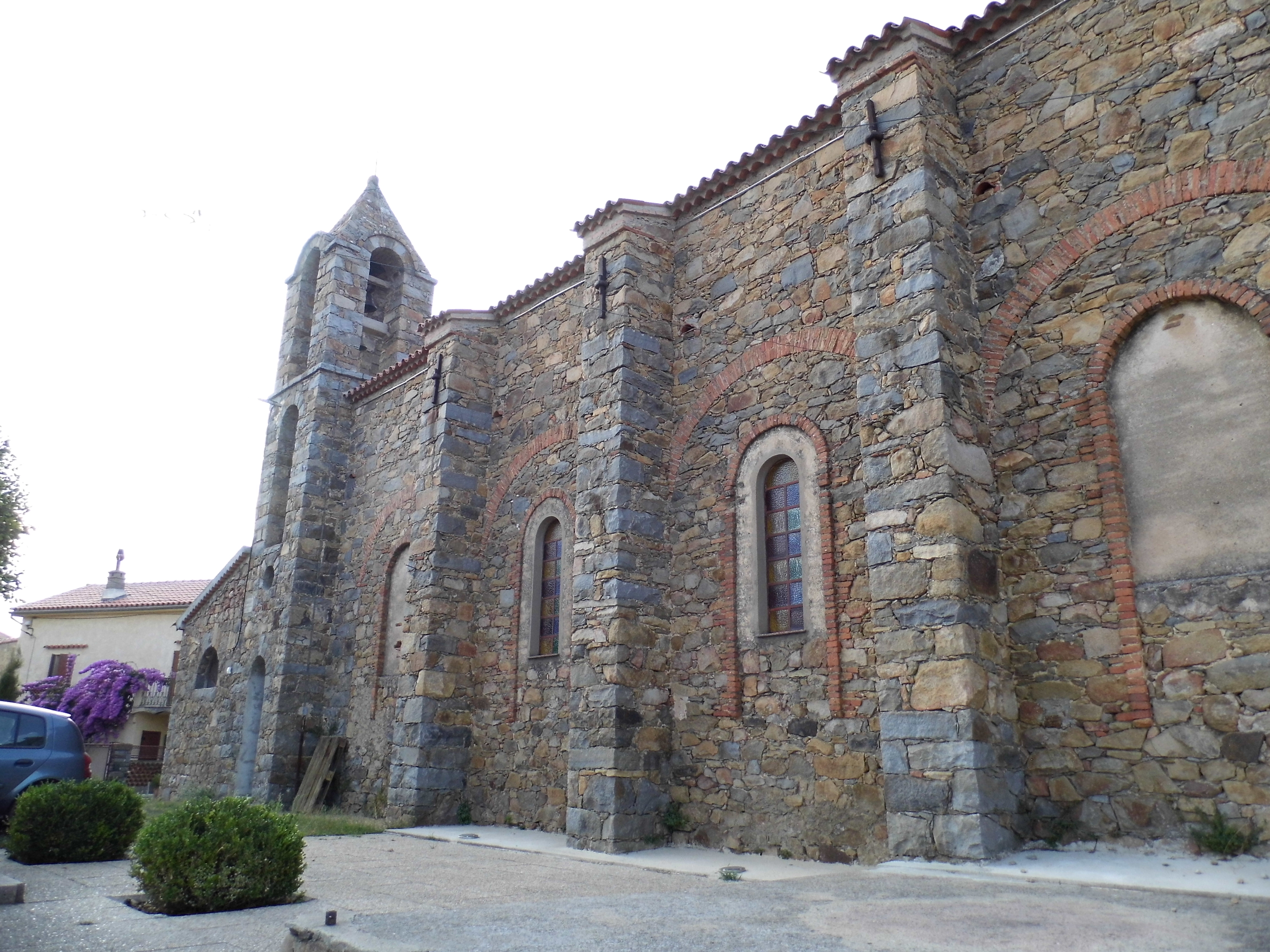
- The church in Sari-Solenzara
- Location of Sari-Solenzara
- Location within France Location within Corsica
- Coordinates: 41°50′09″N 9°22′26″E
- Country: France
- Region: Corsica
- Department: Corse-du-Sud
- Arrondissement: Sartène
- Canton: Bavella
- Intercommunality: Alta Rocca

Government
  - Mayor (2020–2026): Jean Toma
- Area^{1}: 73.85 km^{2} (28.51 sq mi)
- Elevation: 300 m (980 ft)
- Highest elevation: 1,087 m (3,566 ft)
- Lowest elevation: 0 m (0 ft)
- Population (2023): 1,445
  - Density: 19.57/km^{2} (50.68/sq mi)
- Time zone: UTC+01:00 (CET)
  - Summer (DST): UTC+02:00 (CEST)
- INSEE/Postal code: 2A269 /20145
- ^{1} French Land Register data, which excludes lakes, ponds, glaciers > 1 km^{2} (0.386 sq mi or 247 acres) and river estuaries.

Sari-Solenzara (French pronunciation: [saʁi sɔlɛntsaʁ(a)]; Corsican: Sari è Sulinzara; formerly in French: Sari-di-Porto-Vecchio, Italian: Sari di Porto Vecchio, Corsican: Sari di Portivechju) is a commune and municipality in the French department of Corse-du-Sud, on the island of Corsica. It is delineated by several natural borders: the Tyrrhenian Sea to its east, the River Solenzara to its north, and to its west the Aiguilles de Bavella, a beautiful mountain at the heart of the island. A rural district, it essentially consists of two settlements: the larger seaside village of Solenzara, and the smaller hilltop village of Sari. Smaller outlying hamlets include Togna, Canella, Tarcu and Favona. Highly mountainous and forested, Sari-Solenzara falls partially within the Alta Rocca district of the Corsican Regional Nature Reserve.

== Population ==
Historical population
| Year | Pop. | ±% p.a. |
|---|---|---|
| 1968 | 915 | — |
| 1975 | 1,141 | +3.20% |
| 1982 | 1,399 | +2.95% |
| 1990 | 1,178 | −2.13% |
| 1999 | 1,102 | −0.74% |
| 2007 | 1,191 | +0.98% |
| 2012 | 1,385 | +3.06% |
| 2017 | 1,345 | −0.58% |
| 2023 | 1,445 | +1.20% |
Source: INSEE

== Sports ==
- Diving
- Canyoning
- Riding
- Fishing harbour and marina
- Via ferrata

== Local gastronomy ==
- Sausage : lonzu, coppa, wild boar sausage, figatelli
- Chestnut paste
- Ewe and goat cheeses

== See also ==
- Communes of the Corse-du-Sud department
