= Calenzana =

- Commune
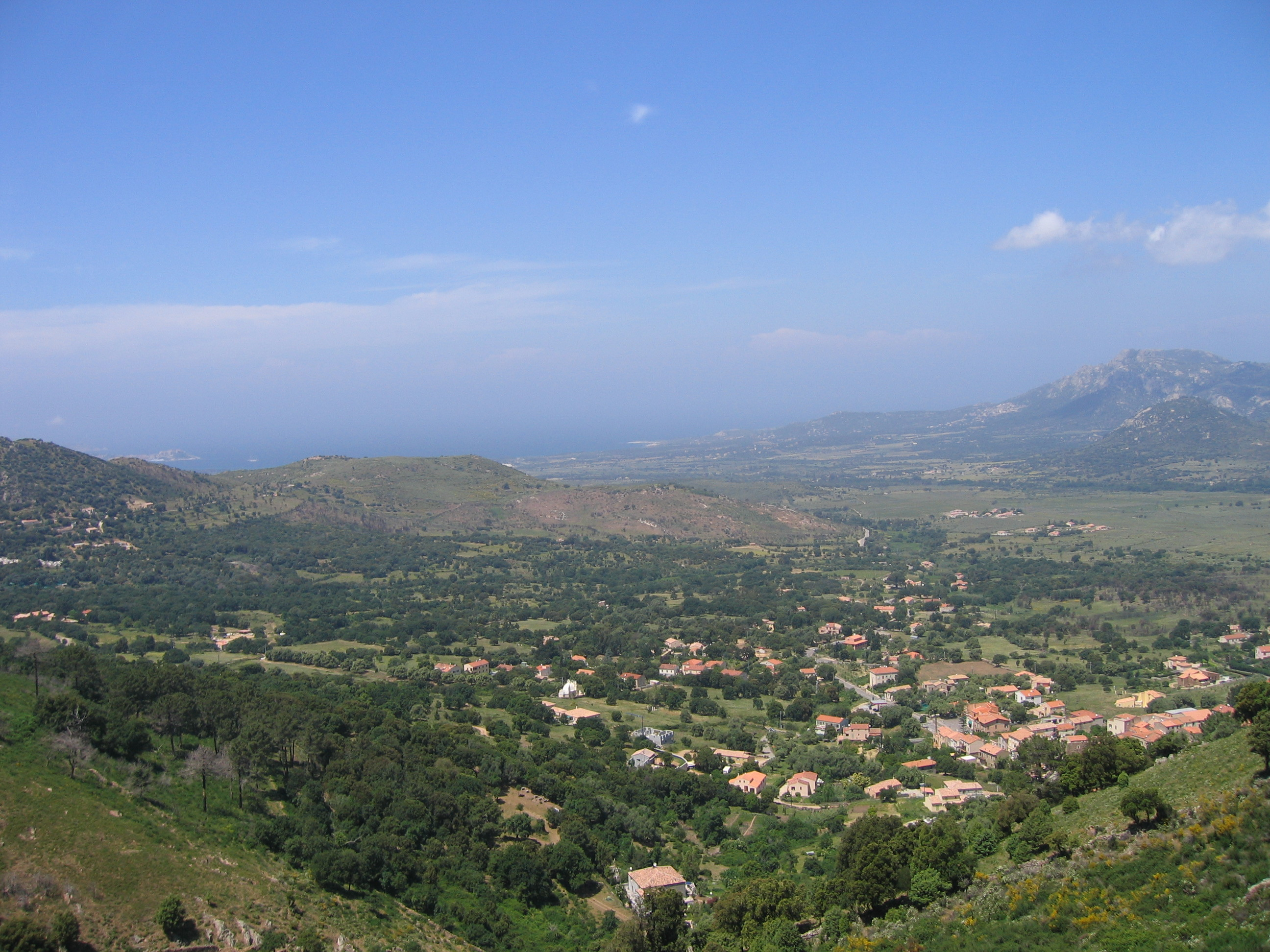
- Calenzana seen from the GR 20

- Coat of arms
- Location of Calenzana
- Location within France Location within Corsica
- Coordinates: 42°30′31″N 8°51′21″E
- Country: France
- Region: Corsica
- Department: Haute-Corse
- Arrondissement: Calvi
- Canton: Calvi

Government
  - Mayor (2020–2026): Pierre Guidoni
- Area^{1}: 182.77 km^{2} (70.57 sq mi)
- Elevation: 250 m (820 ft)
- Highest elevation: 2,144 m (7,034 ft)
- Lowest elevation: 0 m (0 ft)
- Population (2023): 2,684
  - Density: 14.69/km^{2} (38.03/sq mi)
- Time zone: UTC+01:00 (CET)
  - Summer (DST): UTC+02:00 (CEST)
- INSEE/Postal code: 2B049 /20214
- ^{1} French Land Register data, which excludes lakes, ponds, glaciers > 1 km^{2} (0.386 sq mi or 247 acres) and river estuaries.

Calenzana (French pronunciation: [kalɛnzana]; Corsican: Calinzana) is a commune in the Haute-Corse department of France on the island of Corsica.

In 1732 it was the site of an uprising by Corsican nationalists against the island's Genoese rulers.

It is now best known as the starting (or finishing) point of the GR 20 long distance walk.

The commune contains the Étang de Crovani, a coastal lagoon, that lies behind the Crovani beach (or Argentella beach) on Crovani bay.

== Population ==
Historical population
Year	Pop.	±% p.a.
1968	1,061	—
1975	1,478	+4.85%
1982	1,623	+1.35%
1990	1,535	−0.69%
1999	1,722	+1.29%
2007	1,831	+0.77%
2012	2,308	+4.74%
2017	2,342	+0.29%
2023	2,684	+2.30%
Source: INSEE

== Monuments ==
- Église Saint-Blaise de Calenzana

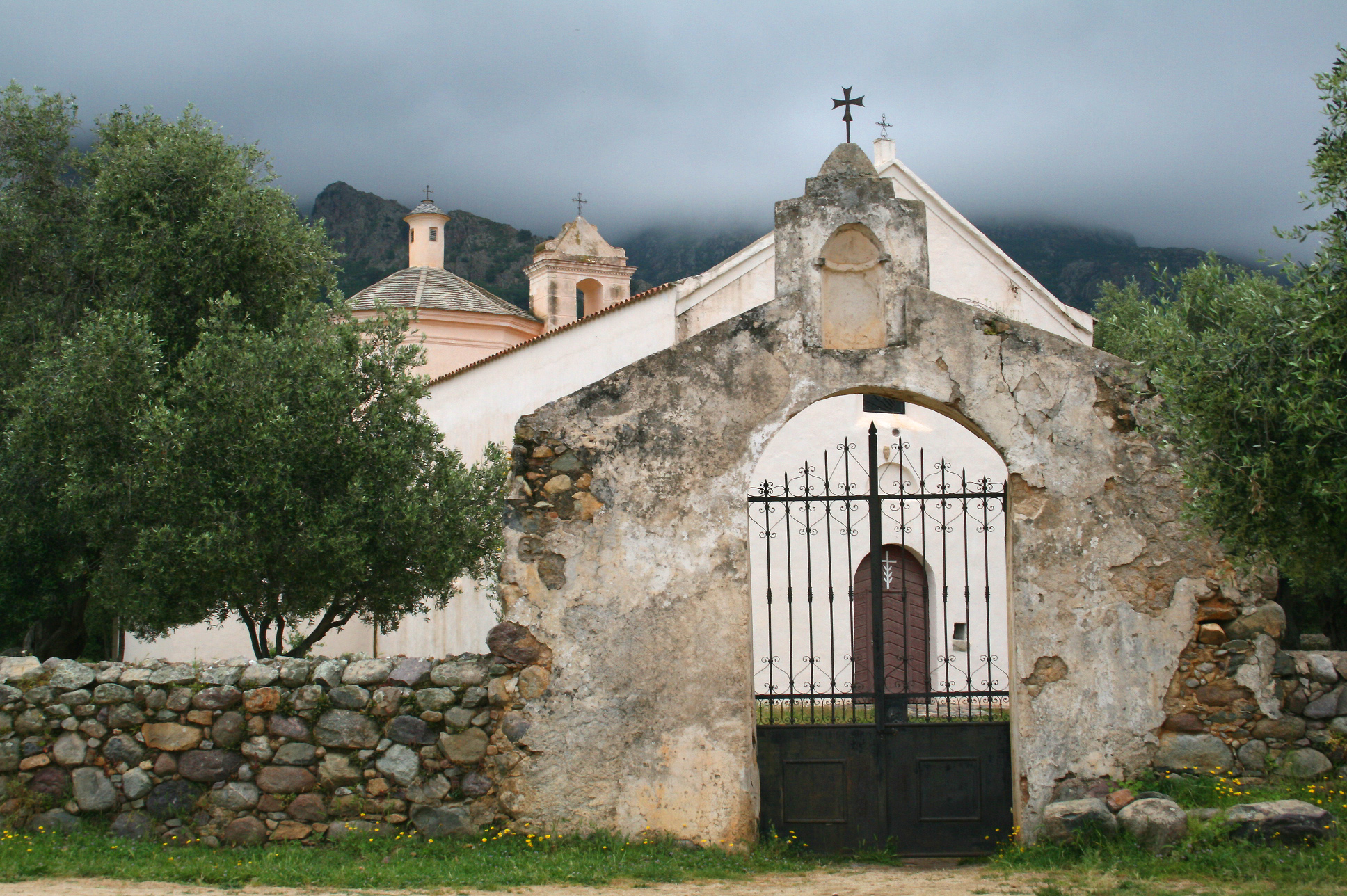
Saint-Restitude (15th century)

== See also ==
- Communes of the Haute-Corse department
