= Église Saint-Blaise de Calenzana =

Church in Haute-Corse, France

Coordinates: 42°30′31″N 8°51′21″E

Église Saint-Blaise de Calenzana is a church in Calenzana, Haute-Corse, Corsica. The building was classified as a Historic Monument in 1981.
