= GR 20 =

Hiking trail in Corsica

Coordinates: 42.1271°N 9.1328°E

GR20
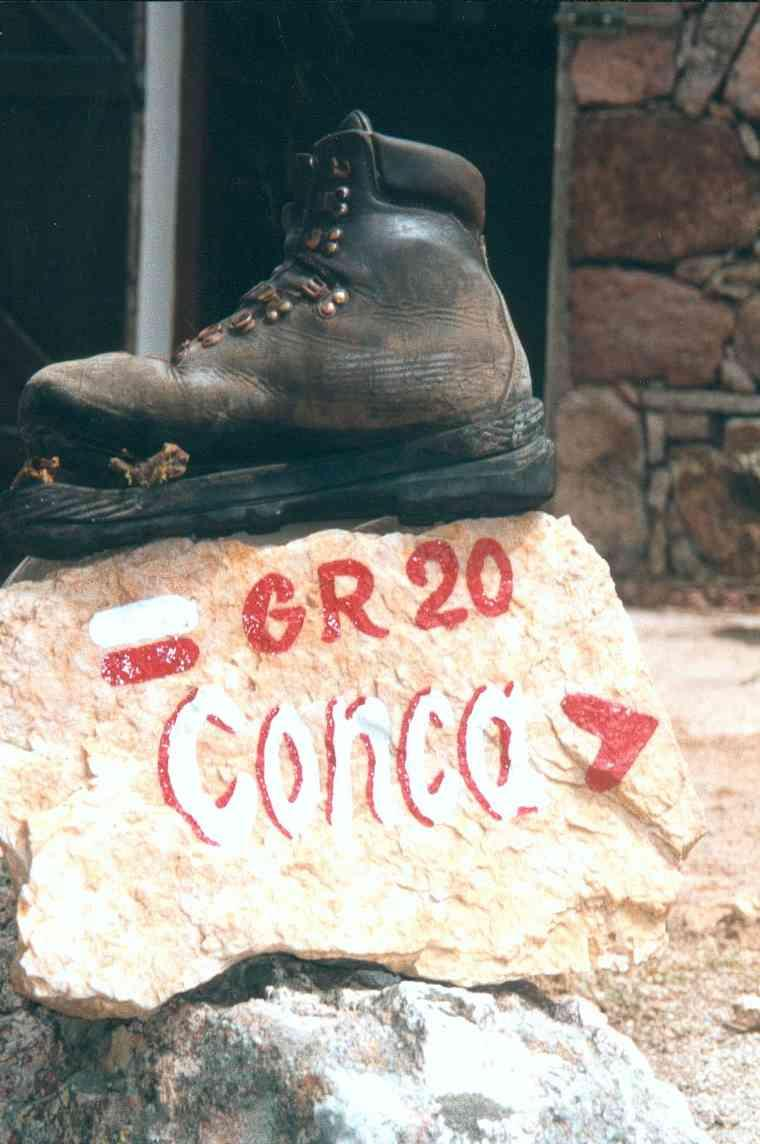
- A hiking boot, found just before the last refuge before arriving at Conca, the southern end of the trail.
- Length: 180 km (110 mi)
- Location: Corsica
- Designation: GR footpath
- Trailheads: Calenzana, Conca
- Use: Hiking
- Elevation gain/loss: 12,000 m
- Hazards: Fog, high winds

Trail map
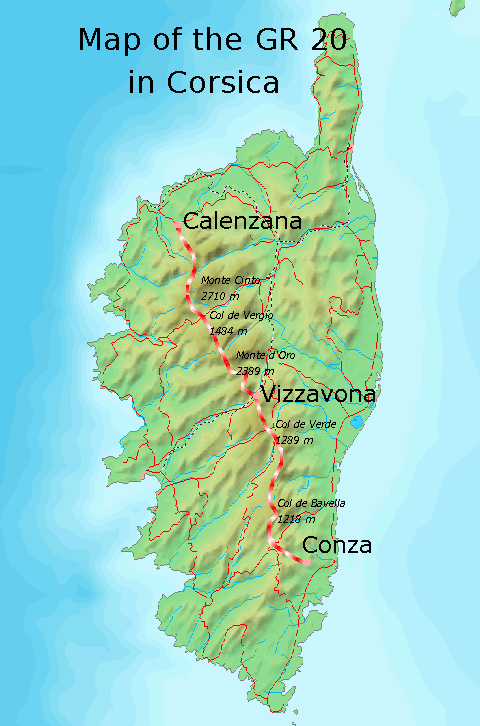
- Map of Corsica showing the route of the GR 20

Red and white marks and sometimes piles of rocks indicate the direction.

The GR 20 (or fra li monti) is a GR footpath that crosses the Mediterranean island of Corsica running approximately north–south, described by the outdoor writer Paddy Dillon as "one of the top trails in the world".

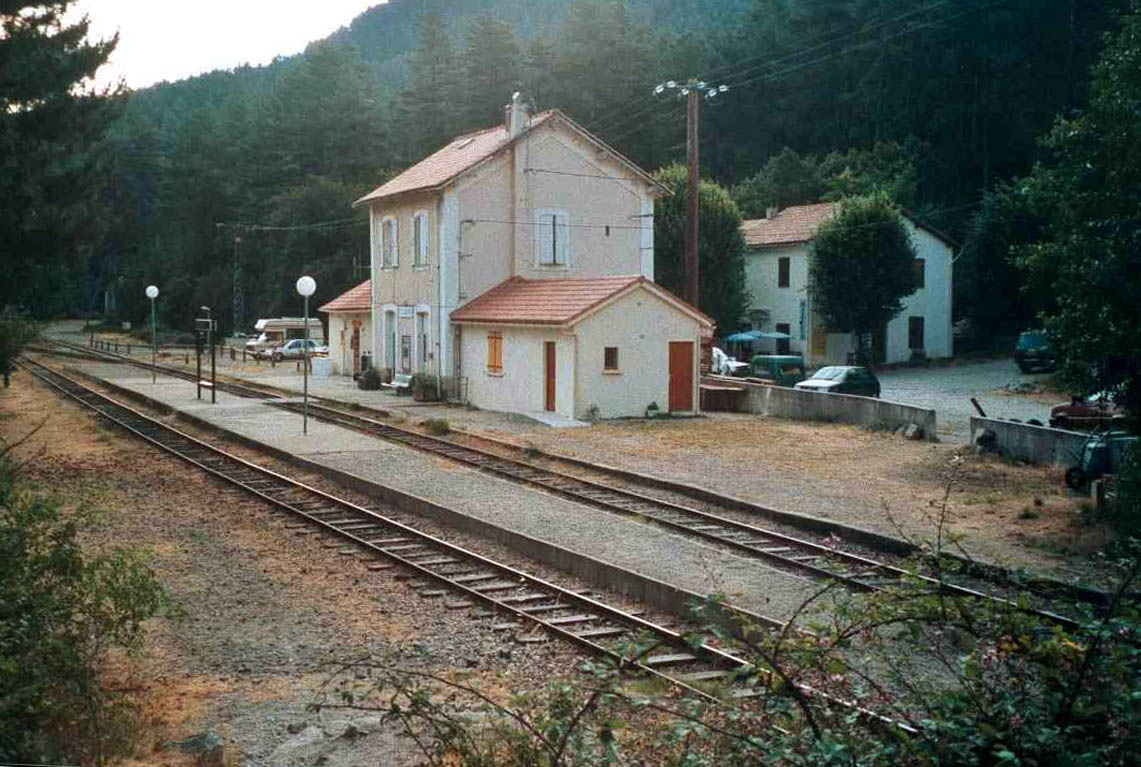
The railway station in Vizzavona

The whole trail is about 180 km long with 12,000 m of elevation gain, and is clearly waymarked throughout. Every year, approximately 10,000 to 20,000 hikers walk along the trail, typically completing it in about 15 days. The trail is considered to be the most difficult of all the GR routes and consists of two parts: the northern part, between Calenzana and Vizzavona and the southern part, between Vizzavona and Conca.

Vizzavona is regarded as the midpoint due to the presence of a train station, making it a convenient starting or ending point for hikers covering only one part the route. From Vizzavona, the train can be taken to Bastia or Ajaccio as well as many smaller towns and villages such as Corte. The northern part is considered by some the more difficult part because of the steep and rocky paths, though this could be an effect of many walkers beginning in the north and not being as fit for this section. The southern part of the trail is often considered easier though the lower altitude may give rise to higher temperatures in summer and so provide more difficult walking conditions.

Along the trail there are mountain huts known as "refuges" or gîte d'etapes. The standard and price of accommodations and food varies between refuges. Hikers can sleep in a tent near the refuge, but it is not permitted to pitch tents along the trail.

The GR 20 is an advanced trail. Other less difficult trails on the island include the Mare e monti (sea and mountains) and the Mare a mare (from sea to sea) trails.

The idea of GR 20 comes from a former general inspector for youth and sports, Marcel Schlück, and his friend Guy Degos, both hiking enthusiasts.

== Route ==
- Northern part: Calenzana – Ortu di Piobbu or Bonifatu (alternative route) – Carozzu – Asco Stagnu – Tighjettu – Ciottulu di I Mori (or Castel de Vergio) – Manganu – Petra Piana – L'Onda – Vizzavona
- Southern part: Vizzavona – E Capenelle – I Prati – Usciulu – Matalza (added in the late 2011) – Asinao – I Paliri – Conca

== Records ==
Men's

In June 2016, François D'Haene set a time of 31 hours and 6 minutes. In 2021, this was broken by Lambert Santelli with a time of 30 hours 25 minutes. In July 2026, D'Haene retook the record with a time of 29 hours and 46 minutes.

In september 2026 Aurelien Dunand Pallaz improved the record of 2h17 by realising the crossing in 27h and 29 minutes

Women's

The current record by a woman is held by Anne-Lise Rousset who completed the course in 35 hours and 50 minutes in June 2022.

== See also ==
- Orla Perć
- Aiguilles de Bavella
