= Vizzavona =

Coordinates: 42°07′49″N 9°07′59″E

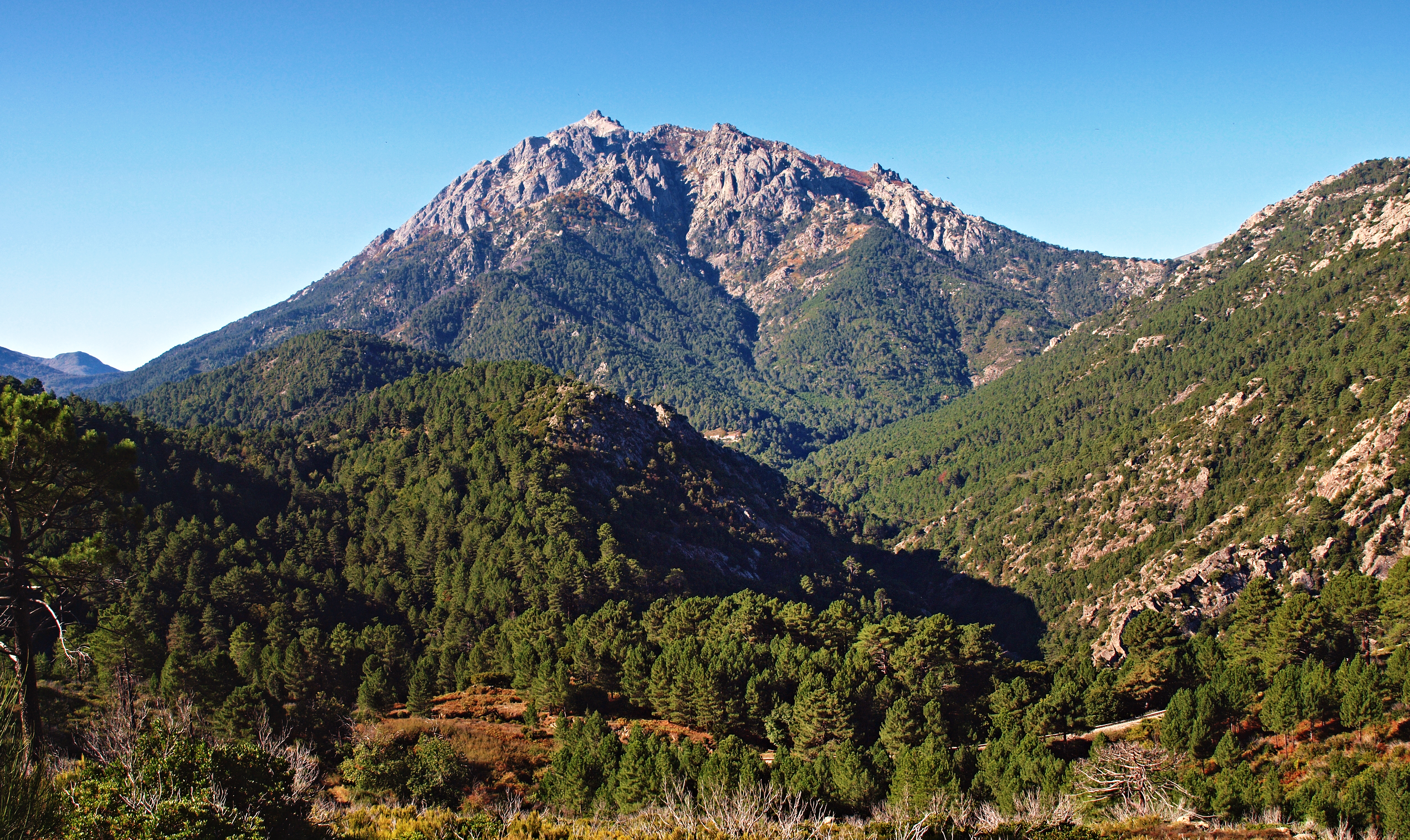
Monte d'Oro

Vizzavona is a village of the commune of Vivario in the Haute-Corse department of France on the island of Corsica at an altitude of 900 meters. The village is dominated by Monte d'Oro (2389m).

== Transport ==
The town is served by a station on the Corsican Railways.

== Tourism ==
It marks the halfway point of the GR20 walking route.
