= Conca, Corse-du-Sud =

Commune in Corsica, France

Conca
- Commune
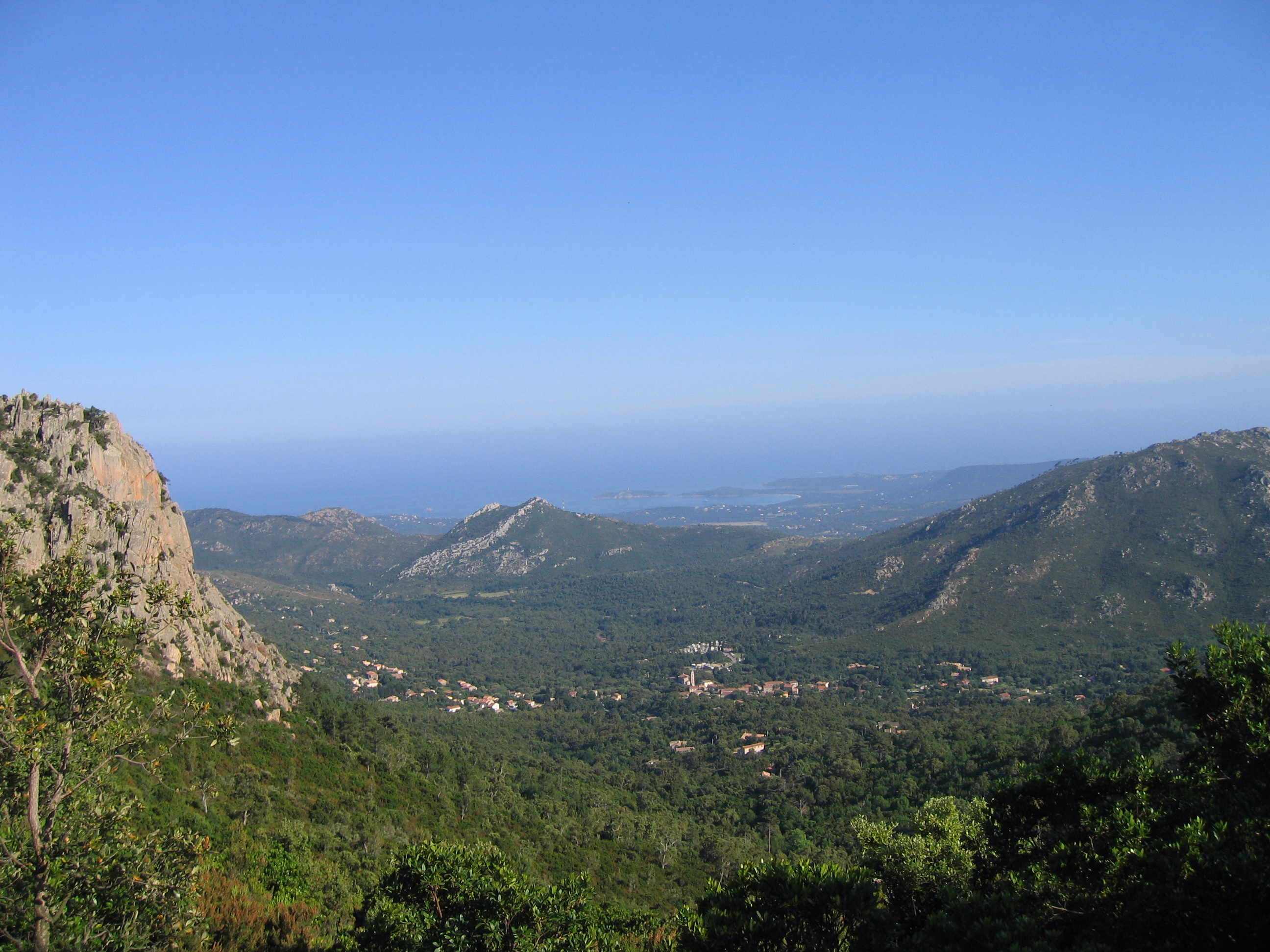
- A view of the village of Conca from the GR20
- Location of Conca
- Location within France Location within Corsica
- Coordinates: 41°44′09″N 9°20′02″E
- Country: France
- Region: Corsica
- Department: Corse-du-Sud
- Arrondissement: Sartène
- Canton: Bavella

Government
  - Mayor (2020–2026): François Mosconi
- Area^{1}: 77.96 km^{2} (30.10 sq mi)
- Elevation: 250 m (820 ft)
- Highest elevation: 1,445 m (4,741 ft)
- Lowest elevation: 0 m (0 ft)
- Population (2023): 1,175
  - Density: 15.07/km^{2} (39.04/sq mi)
- Time zone: UTC+01:00 (CET)
  - Summer (DST): UTC+02:00 (CEST)
- INSEE/Postal code: 2A092 /20135
- ^{1} French Land Register data, which excludes lakes, ponds, glaciers > 1 km^{2} (0.386 sq mi or 247 acres) and river estuaries.

Conca is a commune in the Corse-du-Sud department of France on the island of Corsica. It is the southern terminus of the GR 20 walking route.

== Geography ==
=== Climate ===
Conca has a mediterranean climate (Köppen climate classification Csa). The average annual temperature in Conca is 16.9 °C (62.4 °F). The average annual rainfall is 866.3 mm (34.11 in) with November as the wettest month. The temperatures are highest on average in August, at around 26.0 °C (78.8 °F), and lowest in January, at around 9.5 °C (49.1 °F). The highest temperature ever recorded in Conca was 40.6 °C (105.1 °F) on 2 August 2022; the coldest temperature ever recorded was −3.4 °C (25.9 °F) on 27 February 2018.

Climate data for Conca (1991–2020 averages, extremes 1999−present)
Month	Jan	Feb	Mar	Apr	May	Jun	Jul	Aug	Sep	Oct	Nov	Dec	Year
Record high °C (°F)	22.0 (71.6)	23.2 (73.8)	26.9 (80.4)	27.1 (80.8)	34.5 (94.1)	38.8 (101.8)	39.3 (102.7)	40.6 (105.1)	36.7 (98.1)	31.2 (88.2)	24.9 (76.8)	21.3 (70.3)	39.7 (103.5)
Mean daily maximum °C (°F)	12.7 (54.9)	13.4 (56.1)	15.8 (60.4)	19.1 (66.4)	23.3 (73.9)	28.4 (83.1)	31.6 (88.9)	31.7 (89.1)	26.8 (80.2)	22.2 (72.0)	16.9 (62.4)	13.8 (56.8)	21.3 (70.3)
Daily mean °C (°F)	9.5 (49.1)	9.7 (49.5)	11.7 (53.1)	14.6 (58.3)	18.3 (64.9)	22.8 (73.0)	25.7 (78.3)	26.0 (78.8)	22.1 (71.8)	18.2 (64.8)	13.7 (56.7)	10.7 (51.3)	16.9 (62.4)
Mean daily minimum °C (°F)	6.3 (43.3)	6.0 (42.8)	7.7 (45.9)	10.0 (50.0)	13.4 (56.1)	17.2 (63.0)	19.9 (67.8)	20.3 (68.5)	17.4 (63.3)	14.3 (57.7)	10.4 (50.7)	7.6 (45.7)	12.5 (54.5)
Record low °C (°F)	−0.8 (30.6)	−3.4 (25.9)	−1.7 (28.9)	1.8 (35.2)	4.9 (40.8)	8.3 (46.9)	13.1 (55.6)	14.8 (58.6)	9.0 (48.2)	4.2 (39.6)	0.7 (33.3)	−2.0 (28.4)	−3.4 (25.9)
Average precipitation mm (inches)	101.3 (3.99)	82.8 (3.26)	98.1 (3.86)	76.3 (3.00)	60.3 (2.37)	22.4 (0.88)	9.6 (0.38)	13.3 (0.52)	65.8 (2.59)	109.5 (4.31)	124.9 (4.92)	101.8 (4.01)	866.3 (34.11)
Average precipitation days (≥ 1.0 mm)	8.6	8.0	8.3	7.1	5.4	3.3	1.7	1.7	4.8	7.0	10.3	9.0	75.1
Source: Météo France

== Population ==
Historical population
Year	Pop.	±% p.a.
1968	432	—
1975	481	+1.55%
1982	546	+1.83%
1990	783	+4.61%
1999	770	−0.19%
2007	1,015	+3.51%
2012	1,097	+1.57%
2017	1,100	+0.05%
2023	1,175	+1.11%
Source: INSEE

== See also ==
- Communes of the Corse-du-Sud department
- Aiguilles de Bavella
