= Corsican language =

Italo-Dalmatian language

Corsican
- corsu, lingua corsa
- Pronunciation: [ˈkorsu]
- Native to: France; Italy
- Region: Corsica; Sardinia (Northern)
- Ethnicity: Corsicans
- Native speakers: c. 105,000 in Corsica (2022)
- Language family: Indo-European: Italic; Latino-Faliscan; Latin; Romance; Italo-Western; Italo-Dalmatian; Italo-Romance; Corsican
- Dialects: Northern Corsican; Southern Corsican; Gallurese (Note: Gallurese and Sassarese are sometimes considered separate languages spoken by minority groups with distinct identity.); Sassarese; Central Corsican; Capraiese (semi-Corsican dialect)†; Castellanese
- Writing system: Latin script (Corsican alphabet)

Official status
- Recognised minority language in: Corsica
- Regulated by: No official regulation

Language codes
- ISO 639-1: co
- ISO 639-2: cos
- ISO 639-3: cos – Corsican
- Glottolog: cors1242 Corsic
- ELP: Corsican
- Linguasphere: 51-AAA-p
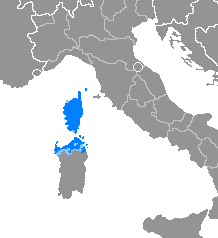
- Spread of Corsican dialects

- Corsican is classified as Definitely Endangered by the UNESCO Atlas of the World's Languages in Danger

Corsican (corsu, pronounced [ˈkorsu], or lingua corsa, pronounced [ˈliŋɡwa ˈɡorsa]) is a Romance language of the Italo-Romance group, spoken on the Mediterranean island of Corsica, a territory of France, and in the northern part of the island of Sardinia, an autonomous region of Italy. Its northern varieties result from an intense medieval Tuscanisation and are closely related to, and largely mutually intelligible with, Standard Italian, whereas its southern varieties preserve features of an older stratum shared with Sardinian and show affinities with the Extreme Southern Italian dialects.

On the sociolinguistic level, since the 1970s Corsican has increasingly been treated as an autonomous language in its own right rather than an Italian dialect, a status captured by the notion of polynomic language developed by Jean-Baptiste Marcellesi.

Under the long-standing influence of Tuscany's Pisa, and the historic Republic of Genoa, over Corsica, the Corsican language once filled the role of a vernacular, with Italian functioning as the island's official language until France acquired the island from the Republic of Genoa (1768); by 1859, French had replaced Italian as Corsica's first language so much so that, by the time of the Liberation of France (1945), nearly every islander had at least a working-knowledge of French. The 20th century saw a vast language shift, with the islanders adapting and changing their communications to the extent that there were no monolingual Corsican-speakers left by the 1960s. By 1995, an estimated 65% of islanders had some degree of proficiency in Corsican, and a minority of around 10% used Corsican as a first language.

== Classification ==
Chart of Romance languages based on structural and comparative criteria.

Corsican is classed as a regional language under French law. It is almost universally agreed that Corsican is typologically and traditionally Italo-Romance, but its specific position therein is more controversial. Some scholars argue that Corsican belongs to the Centro-Southern Italian dialects, while others are of the opinion that it is closely related to, or as part of, Italy's Tuscan dialect varieties. Italian and the dialects of Corsican (especially Northern Corsican) are in fact very mutually intelligible. Southern Corsican, in spite of the geographical proximity, has as its closest linguistic neighbour not Sardinian (a separate group with which it is not mutually intelligible), but rather the Extreme Southern Italian dialects like Siculo-Calabrian. It has been theorised, on the other hand, that a Sardinian variety, or a variety very similar to Sardo-Romance, might have been originally spoken in Corsica prior to the island's Tuscanisation under Pisan and Genoese rule.

Corsican's affinities with the central and centro-southern Italian dialects had already been noted in earlier scholarship: Diez (1874) and Meyer-Lübke (1941) grouped Corsican with the central Italian dialects (the centro-southern macro-group, as opposed to the northern one), and Clemente Merlo, in his study "Concordanze corse-italiane-centromeridionali" (1925), pointed to phonetic and morphosyntactic features shared by Corsican and the dialects spoken "from the southern Marche and Umbria down to Apulia, Calabria and Sicily".

The matter is controversial in light of the historical, cultural and particularly strong linguistic bonds that Corsica had traditionally formed with the Italian Mainland from the Middle Ages until the 19th century: in contrast to the neighbouring Sardinia, Corsica's installment into a diglossic system with Italian as the island's prestige language ran so deep that both Corsican and Italian might be even, and in fact were, perceived as two sociolinguistic levels of a single language. Corsican and Italian traditionally existed on a spectrum, and the dividing lines between them were blurred enough that the locals needed little else but a change of register to communicate in an official setting. "Tuscanising" their tongue, or as the Corsican elites would have once said, parlà in crusca ("speaking in crusca", from the name of the Academy dedicated to the standardisation of the Italian language), allowed for a practice not of code-switching, but rather of code-mixing which is quite typical of the Mainland Italian dialects. Italian was perceived as different from Corsican, but not as much as the differences between the two main isoglosses of Northern and Southern Corsican, as spoken by their respective native speakers. When Pasquale Paoli found himself exiled in London, he replied to Samuel Johnson's query on the peculiar existence of a "rustic language" very different from Italian that such a language existed only in Sardinia; in fact, the existence of Corsican as the island's native vernacular did not take anything away from Paoli's claims that Corsica's official language was Italian.

Today's Corsican is the result of these historical vicissitudes, which have morphed the language to an idiom that bears a strong resemblance to the medieval Tuscan once spoken at the time of Dante and Boccaccio, and still existing in peripheral Tuscany (Lucca, Garfagnana, Elba, Capraia). The correspondence of modern Corsican to ancient Tuscan can be seen from almost any aspect of the language, ranging from the phonetics, morphology, lexicon to the syntax. One of the characteristics of standard Italian is the retention of the -re infinitive ending, as in Latin mittere "send"; such infinitival ending is lost in Tuscan as well as Corsican, resulting in the outcome mette / metta, "to put". Whereas the relative pronoun in Italian for "who" is chi and "what" is che/(che) cosa, it is an uninflected chì in Corsican. The only unifying, as well as distinctive, feature which separates the Corsican dialects from the mainland Tuscan ones, with the exception of Amiatino, Pitiglianese, and Capraiese, is the retention of word-final o-u. For example, the Italian demonstrative pronouns questo "this" and quello "that" become in Corsican questu or quistu and quellu or quiddu: this feature was also typical of the early Italian texts during the Middle Ages.

Even after the acquisition of Corsica by Louis XV, Italian continued to be the island's language of education, literature, religion and local affairs. The affluent youth still went to Italy to pursue higher studies. (It has been estimated that Corsican presence in Pisa amounted to a fourth of the University's total student body in 1830.) Local civil registers continued to be written in Italian until 1855; it was on 9 May 1859, that Italian was replaced by French as the island's official language, although the latter would start to take root among the islanders from 1882 onwards, through the Jules Ferry laws aimed at spreading literacy across the French provinces. Even so, a specifically homegrown Corsican (rather than Italian) literature in Corsica only developed belatedly and, in its earliest phase, there were no autonomous cultural instances; Corsican writers, such as Salvatore Viale, even prided themselves on their affiliation to the broader Italian sphere, considering Corsican "one of the lowest, impure dialects of Italy".

It was the Italian Fascist aggressive claims to the island in the 20th century, followed by their invasion, that provoked a popular backlash, estranging the native islanders from standard Italian and, if anything, only accelerated their shifting to the French even further. By the Liberation of France, any previously existing link between the two linguistic varieties and with Italy altogether had been severed; any promotion of Corsican, which had been politicized by the local collaborators with the regime, would be met with popular criticism and even suspicion of potentially harboring irredentist sentiments. From then on, Corsican would grow independently of Italian to become, later in the 1970s, a centerpiece of the Riacquistu ("reacquisition") movement for the rediscovery of Corsican culture. Nationalist calls for Corsican to be put on the same footing as French led the French National Assembly, in 1974, to extend the 1951 Deixonne Law, which initially recognized only a few languages (Breton, Basque, Catalan and Occitan), to including Corsican as well, among others, not as a dialect of Italian, but as one of France's full-fledged regional languages. (See governmental support.)

== Origins ==
The common relationship between Corsica and central Italy can be traced from as far back as the Etruscans, who asserted their presence on the island in as early as 500 BC. In 40 AD, the natives of Corsica reportedly did not speak Latin. The Roman exile, Seneca the Younger, reported that both coast and interior were occupied by natives whose language he was not able to understand. More specifically, Seneca claimed that the island's population was the result of the stratification of different ethnic groups, such as the Greeks, the Ligures (see the Ligurian hypothesis) and the Iberians, whose language had long since stopped being recognizable among the population due to the intermixing of the other two groups. The occupation of the island by the Vandals around the year 469 marked the end of authoritative influence by Latin speakers. (See Medieval Corsica.) If the natives of that time spoke Latin, they must have acquired it during the late empire.

Modern Corsican has been influenced by the languages of the major powers taking an interest in Corsican affairs; earlier by those of the medieval Italian powers, such as the Papal States (828–1077), the Republic of Pisa (1077–1282) and the Republic of Genoa (1282–1768), and finally by France which, since 1859, has promulgated the official Parisian French. The term "gallicised Corsican" refers to the evolution of Corsican starting from about the year 1950, whereas "distanciated Corsican" refers to an idealized variety of Corsican following linguistic purism, by means of removing any French-derived elements.

== Dialects ==
=== Corsica ===
The two most widely spoken forms of the Corsican language are the groups spoken in the Bastia and Corte area (generally throughout the northern half of the island, known as Haute-Corse, Cismonte or Corsica suprana), and the groups spoken around Sartène and Porto-Vecchio (generally throughout the southern half of the island, known as Corse-du-Sud, Pumonti or Corsica suttana). The dialect of Ajaccio has been described as in transition. The dialects spoken at Calvi and Bonifacio (Bonifacino) are dialects of the Ligurian language.

This division along the Girolata-Porto Vecchio line was due to the massive immigration from Tuscany which took place in Corsica during the lower Middle Ages: as a result, the northern Corsican dialects became very close to a central Italian dialect like Tuscan, while the southern Corsican varieties could keep the original characteristics of the language which make it much more similar to Sicilian and, only to some extent, Sardinian.

==== Northern Corsican ====
The Northern Corsican macro variety (Supranacciu, Supranu, Cismuntincu or Cismontano) is the most widespread on the island and standardised as well, and is spoken in North-West Corsica around the districts of Bastia and Corte. The dialects of Bastia and Cap Corse belong to the Western Tuscan dialects; they being, with the exception of Florentine, the closest to standard Italian. All the dialects presenting, in addition to what has already been stated, the conditional formed in -ebbe (e.g. (ella) amarebbe "she would love") are generally considered Cismontani dialects, situated north of a line uniting the villages of Piana, Vico, Vizzavona, Ghisoni and Ghisonaccia, and also covering the subgroups from the Cap Corse (which, unlike the rest of the island and similarly to Italian, uses lu, li, la, le as definite articles), Bastia (besides i > e and a > e, u > o: ottanta, momentu, toccà, continentale; a > o: oliva, orechja, ocellu), Balagna, Niolo and Corte (which retain the general Corsican traits: distinu, ghjinnaghju, sicondu, billezza, apartu, farru, marcuri, cantaraghju, uttanta, mumentu, tuccà, cuntinentale, aliva, arechja, acellu).

==== Transitional area ====
Across the Northern and Southern borders of the line separating the Northern dialects from the Southern ones, there is a transitional area picking up linguistic phenomena associated with either of the two groups, with some local peculiarities. Along the Northern line are the dialects around Piana and Calcatoggio, from Cinarca with Vizzavona (which form the conditional as in the South), and Fiumorbo through Ghisonaccia and Ghisoni, which have the retroflex [ɖ] sound (written -dd-) for historical -ll-; along the Southern line, the dialects of Ajaccio (retroflex -dd-, realized as -ghj-, feminine plurals ending in i, some Northern words like cane and accattà instead of ghjacaru and cumprà, as well as ellu/ella and not eddu/edda; minor variations: sabbatu > sabbitu, u li dà > ghi lu dà; final syllables often stressed and truncated: marinari > marinà, panatteri > panattè, castellu > castè, cuchjari > cuchjà), the Gravona area, Bastelica (which would be classified as Southern, but is also noted for its typical rhotacism: Basterga) and Solenzara, which did not preserve the Latin short vowels: seccu, peru, rossu, croci, pozzu.

==== Southern Corsican ====
The distribution of Corsican dialects in Corsica and Sardinia.

The Southern Corsican macro variety (Suttanacciu, Suttanu, Pumuntincu or Oltramontano) is the most archaic and conservative group, spoken in the districts of Sartène and Porto-Vecchio. Unlike the Northern varieties and similarly to Sardinian, the group retains the distinction of the Latin short vowels ĭ and ŭ (e.g. pilu, bucca). It is also strongly marked by the presence of the voiced retroflex stop, like Sicilian (e.g. aceddu, beddu, quiddu, ziteddu, famidda), and the conditional mood formed in -ìa (e.g. (idda) amarìa "she would love"). All the Oltramontani dialects are from an area located to the South of Porticcio, Bastelica, Col di Verde and Solenzara. Notable dialects are those from around Taravo (retroflex -dd- only for historical -ll-: frateddu, suredda, beddu; preservation of the palatal lateral approximant: piglià, famiglia, figliolu, vogliu; does not preserve the Latin short vowels: seccu, peru, rossu, croci, pozzu), Sartène (preserving the Latin short vowels: siccu, piru, russu, cruci, puzzu; changing historical -rn- to -rr-: forru, carri, corru; substituting the stop for the palatal lateral approximant: piddà, famidda, fiddolu, voddu; imperfect tense like cantàvami, cantàvani; masculine plurals ending in a: l'ochja, i poma; having eddu/edda/eddi as personal pronouns), the Alta Rocca (the most conservative area in Corsica, being very close to the varieties spoken in Northern Sardinia), and the Southern region located between the hinterlands of Porto-Vecchio and Bonifacio (masculine singulars always ending in u: fiumu, paesu, patronu; masculine plurals always ending in a: i letta, i solda, i ponta, i foca, i mura, i loca, i balcona; imperfect tense like cantàiami, cantàiani).

=== Sardinia ===
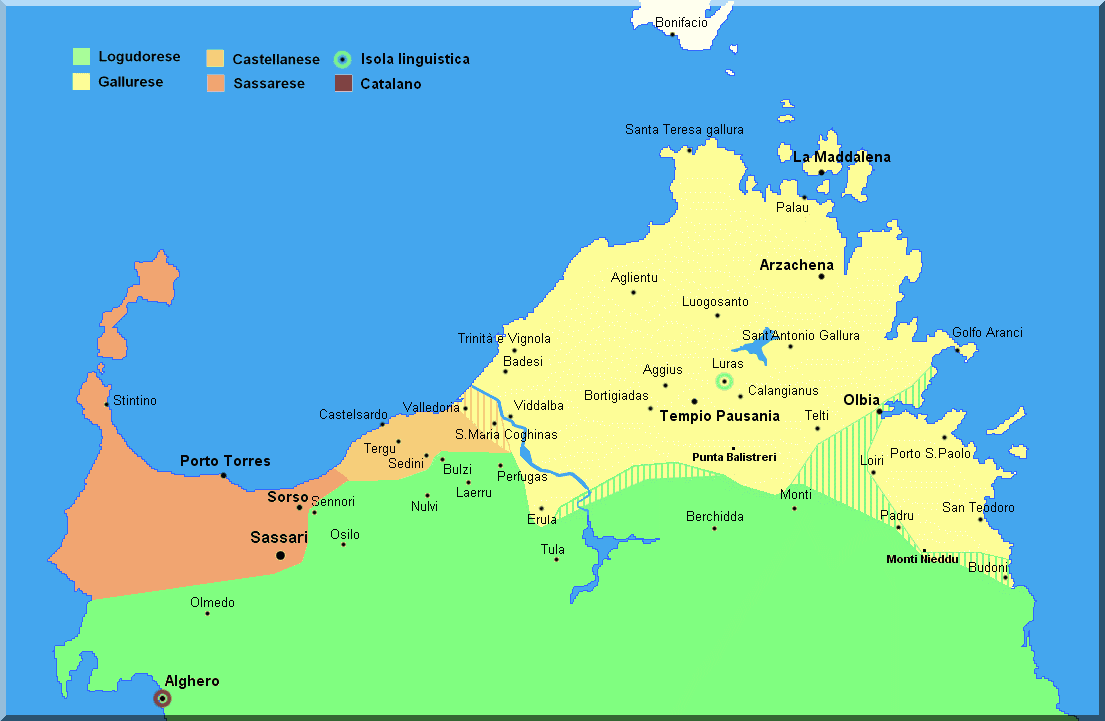
Languages in northern Sardinia

Sassarese derives from the Italian language and, more precisely, from ancient Tuscan, which by the 12th century had slowly grown to become the parlance of the commoners, at a time when the bourgeois and nobles still spoke Logudorese Sardinian. During the age of the Free Commune (1294–1323), the Sassarese dialect was nothing more than a contaminated Pisan, to which Sardinian, Corsican and Spanish expressions had been added; it is therefore not an indigenous dialect, but rather a continental one and, to be more specific, a mixed Tuscan dialect with its own peculiarities, and different from the Corsican-imported Gallurese. (Note: "Il sassarese deriva dalla lingua italiana e, più precisamente, dal toscano antico, poi trasformatosi lentamente in dialetto popolare fin dal secolo XII, quando ancora i borghesi e i nobili parlavano in sardo logudorese. Durante l'età del Libero Comune (1294–1323), il dialetto sassarese non-era altro che un pisano contaminato, al quale si aggiungevano espressioni sarde, corse e spagnole; non è quindi un dialetto autoctono, ma continentale e, meglio determinandolo, un sotto – dialetto toscano misto, con caratteri propri, diverso dal gallurese di importazione corsa.)

— Mario Pompeo Coradduzza, Il sistema del dialetto, 2004, Introduzione

Some Italo-Romance varieties that originated from Southern Corsican, though also influenced by the Sardinian language, are spoken on the neighbouring island of Sardinia; Gallurese in particular is described as Corsican imported from the far south of the island.

Gallurese is spoken in the extreme north of the island, including the region of Gallura, while Sassarese is spoken in Sassari and in its neighbourhood, in the northwest of Sardinia. Their geographical position in Sardinia has been theorised to be the result of different migration waves from the already tuscanized Corsicans and the Tuscans, who then proceeded to settle in Sardinia and slowly displace the indigenous Logudorese Sardinian varieties spoken therein (at present, Luras is the only town in the middle of Gallura that has retained the original language).

On the Maddalena archipelago, which was culturally Corsican but had been annexed to the Savoyard Kingdom of Sardinia a short while before Corsica was ceded by Genoa to France in 1767, the local dialect (called isulanu or maddaleninu) was brought by fishermen and shepherds from Bonifacio over a long period of immigration in the 17th and 18th centuries. Though influenced by Gallurese, it has maintained the original characteristics of Southern Corsican. In the dialect of maddalenino, as it is known in Italian, there are also numerous words of Genoese and Ponzese origin. (Note: For more information, see de Martino 1996.)

Although Gallurese and Sassarese both belong to Italo-Dalmatian, which is a group typologically different from Sardinian, it has long been a subject of debate whether the two should be included as dialects either of Corsican or of Sardinian or, in light of their historical development, even considered languages of their own. It has been argued that all these varieties should be placed in a single category, Southern Romance, but such classification has not garnered universal support among linguists.

On 14 October 1997, Article 2 Item 4 of Law Number 26 of the Autonomous Region of Sardinia granted "the Sassarese and Gallurese dialects" («al dialetto sassarese e a quello gallurese») equal legal status with the other languages indigenous to Sardinia. Thus, even though they would technically not be covered by the national law pertaining to the historical linguistic minorities, among which is Sardinian, Sassarese and Gallurese are nonetheless recognized by the Sardinian government on a regional level.

=== Examples of the main Corsican varieties compared with standard Italian and Elba's Tuscan dialect ===
Language	Example
Standard Italian: I passatempi	Sono nato in Corsica e vi ho passato gli anni migliori della mia giovinezza. Ricordo, quando eravamo ragazzi, che le nostre mamme ci mandavano da soli a fare il bagno. Allora la spiaggia era piena di sabbia, senza scogli né rocce e si stava in mare delle ore fino a quando, paonazzi dal freddo poi ci andavamo a rotolare in quella sabbia bollente dal sole. Poi l'ultimo tuffo per levarci la sabbia attaccata alla pelle e ritornavamo a casa che il sole era già calato, all'ora di cena. Quando faceva buio noi ragazzi ci mandavano a fare granchi, con la luce, che serviva per mettere l'esca agli ami per pescare. Ne raccoglievamo in quantità poi in casa li mettevamo in un sacchetto chiuso in cucina. Una mattina in cui ci eravamo alzati che era ancora buio, quando siamo andati a prendere il sacchetto era vuoto e i granchi giravano per tutte le camere e c'è voluta più di mezz'ora per raccoglierli tutti.
Western Elban: I passatempi	Sò nato in Corsica e c'hajo passato li méglio anni de la mi' giovinezza. Mi mentovo quand'èremo bàmboli che le nosse ma' ci mandàveno da ssoli a fa' 'l bagno. Allora la piaggia era piena di rena, senza scogli né greppe e stàvemo in mare fino a quando ingrozzichiti c'andàvemo a rivorta' 'n chidda rena bollente dal sole. Poi l'urtimo ciutto pe' levacci la rena attaccata a la pella e tornàvemo 'n casa che 'l sole era già ciuttato, a l'ora di cena. Quando veniva buio a no' bàmboli ci mandàveno a fa' granchi, colla luce, che ci voléveno pe' mette' l'ami pe' pescà. Ne aricogliévemo a guaro, po' 'n casa li mettévemo in de 'n sacchetto chiuso 'n cucina. Una matina che c'èremo levati ch'era sempre buio, quando simo andati a piglià 'l sacchetto era voto e li granchi giràveno pe' ttutte le càmmere e c'è voluto più di mezz'ora ad aricoglieli tutti.
Capraiese: I passatempi	Sigghi natu in Corsica e g'hagghi passatu li mégghiu anni di la me ghiuvinézza. Ricordu quandu èrami zitèlli chi le nosse ma' ci mandèvani da ssòli a fa' u bagnu. Allora la piagghia ère piena di réna, senza scógghi né rocce e ci stève in mare dill'òre finu a quandu paunazzi da u freddu po' ci andèvami a rivòrtule in quella réna bullènte da u sole. Po' l'urtimu ciuttu pe' levacci la réna attaccata a la pella e riturnèvamì in casa chi u sole ère ghià calatu, a l'ora di cena. Quandu fève bugghiu a no'zitèlli ci mandèvani a fa' granchi, cu la lusa, chi ci vulèvani pe' annésche l'ami pe' pèsche. Ne ricugghièvami a mandilate piene po' in casa li mettivami in de un sacchéttu chiòsu in cusina. Una matìna chi c'èrami orzati chi ère sempre bugghiu, quandu simmi andati a pigghie u sacchéttu ère vòtu e li granchi ghirèvani pe' ttutte le càmmare e c'è vulutu più di mezz'ora a ricugghiàli tutti.
Northern Corsican: I passatempi	Sò natu in Corsica è c'aghju passatu i più belli anni di a mio giuventù. M'arricordu quand'èramu zitelli chì e nostre mamme ci mandavanu soli à fà u bagnu. Tandu a piaghja era piena di rena, senza scogli né cotule é ci ne stàvamu in mare per ore fin'à quandu, viola per u freddu, dopu ci n'andavamu a vultulàcci in quella rena bullente da u sole. Po' l'ultima capiciuttata per levacci a rena attaccata à a pelle è vultavamu in casa chì u sole era digià calatu, à ora di cena. Quand'ellu facìa bughju à noi zitèlli ci mandàvanu à fà granchi, cù u lume, chì ci vulìa per innescà l'ami per a pesca. N'arricuglìamu à mandilate piene po' in casa i punìamu nu un sacchéttu chjosu in cucina. Una mane chì c'èramu arritti ch'èra sempre bughju, quandu simu andati à piglià u sacchettu ellu èra biotu è i granchi giravanu per tutte e camere è ci hè vulsuta più di méz'ora à ricoglieli tutti.
I passatempi	Sòcu natu in Còrsica e v'agghju passatu i mèddu anni di a me ghjuvintù. M'ammentu quand'érami zitéddi chì i nosci mammi ci mandàiani da par no' a fàcci u bagnu. Tandu a piaghja ghjéra piena di rèna, senza scódda né ròcchi è si staghjìa in mari ori fin'a quandu, viola da u fritu andàghjìami a vultulàcci in quidda rèna buddènti da u soli. Dapo', l'ultima capuzzina pa' livàcci a réna attaccata a à péddi e turràiami in casa chì u soli era ghjà calatu, à l'ora di cena. Quandu facìa bughju à no' zitéddi ci mandàiani à fà granci, cù a luci, chi ci vulìa par inniscà l'ami pà piscà. N'arricuglivàmi à mandili pieni è dapoi in casa i mittìami drent'à un sacchettu chjusu in cucina. Una matìna chì ci n'érami pisàti chi ghjéra sempri bughju, quandu sèmu andati à piddà u sacchéttu iddu éra biotu è i granci ghjiràiani pà tutti i càmari e ci hè vuluta più di méz'ora pà ricapizzulàlli tutti.
Tavarese: I passatempi	Socu natu in Corsica è v'aghju passatu i megliu anni di a me ghjuvantù. Mi rammentu quand'erami ziteddi chì i nosci mammi ci mandaiani da par no à fàcci u bagnu. Tandu a piaghja era piena di rena, senza scogli nè rocchi è si staia in mari ori fin'à quandu, viola da u fretu andaiami à vultugliàcci in quidda rena buddenti da u soli. Dapoi, l'ultima capuzzina pà livàcci a rena attaccata à a peddi è turraiami in casa chì u soli era ghjà calatu, à l'ora di cena. Quandu facìa bughju à no ziteddi ci mandaiani à fà granci, cù a luci, chì ci vulìa par inniscà l'ami pà piscà. N'arricugliìami à mandigli pieni è dopu in casa i mittìami drent'à un sacchettu chjusu in cucina. Una matina chì ci n'erami pisati chì era sempri bughju, quandu semu andati à piglià u sacchettu era biotu è i granci ghjiraiani pà tutti i cammari e ci hè vulsuta più d'una mez'ora pà ricapizzulà li tutti.
Gallurese: Li passatempi	Sòcu natu in Còssiga e v'agghju passatu li mèddu anni di la mè ciuintù. M'ammentu candu érami stéddi chi li nostri mammi ci mandàani da pal noi a fàcci lu bagnu. Tandu la piaghja éra piena di rèna, senza scóddi e né ròcchi e si stagghjìa in mari ori fin'a candu, biaìtti da lu fritu andaghjìami a vultulàcci in chidda rèna buddènti da lu soli. Dapoi, l'ultima capuzzina pa' bucàcci la réna attaccata a la péddi e turràami in casa chi lu soli éra ghjà calatu, a l'ora di cena. Candu facìa bugghju a noi stéddi ci mandàani a fa' granchi, cù la luci, chi vi vulìa pa' accindì(attivà) l'ami pa' piscà. N'accapitàami a mandili pieni e dapoi in casa li mittìami indrent'a un sacchéddu chjusu in cucina. Una matìna chi ci n'érami pisàti chi éra sempri lu bugghju, candu sèmu andati a piddà lu sacchéddu iddu éra bòitu e li granchi ghjràani pa' tutti li càmbari e v'è vuluta più di mez'ora pa' accapitàlli tutti.
Castellanese: Li passatempi	Soggu naddu in Còssiga e v'agghju passaddu li megli'anni di la mè ghjuivintù. M'ammentu cand'èrami piccinni chi li nosthri mammi ci mandavani da pal noi a fàcci lu bagnu . Tandu la spiagghja era piena di rena, senza scogli né rocchi e si sthaggia ori finz'a candu, biàtti da lu freddu andagiami a vultulacci in chidda rena buddendi da lu soli. Dabboi l'ultima cabucina pà buggacci la rena attaccadda a la pèddi e turravami in casa chi lu soli era ghjà caladdu, a l'ora di cena. Candu fagia bughju à noi piccinni ci mandavani a fà ganci, cù la lugi chi vi vulia pà inniscà l'àmi pà piscà. Ni pigliavami assai e daboi in casa li mittìami drent'a un saccheddu sarraddu in cucina. Un mangianu chi ci n'erami pisaddi chi era sempri bugghju, candu semmu andaddi à piglià lu sacchettu era boiddu é li ganci ghjiràvani pàl tutti li càmmari è v'é vuludda più di mezz'ora pà accuglinnili tutti.
Sassarese: (Note: Words beginning with the "gi-" groups (like già, girà, etc.) can be pronounced in a iotic way too, i.e. substituting the 'g' with a 'j' (ja, jirà...). Original note text: "Le parole che iniziano con il gruppo "gi-" (come già, girà, ecc.) possono essere anche pronunciate in maniera iotica, ossia sostituendo la 'g' con una 'j' (ja, jirà...)") Li passatempi	Soggu naddu in Còssiga e v'aggiu passaddu l'anni più beddi di la pitzinnìa mea. M'ammentu, cand'érami minori, chi li mammi nosthri tzi mandàbani a fatzi lu bagnu a la sora. Tandu l'ippiaggia era piena di rena, chena ischogliu né rocca e si isthazìa a mogliu ori fintz'a candu, biaìtti da lu freddu, andàziami a rudduratzi in chidda rena buddendi da lu sori. A dabboi l'ùlthimu cabutzoni pa bugganni la rena attaccadda a la peddi e turràbami a casa chi lu sori era già caraddu, a l'ora di tzinà. Candu si fazìa buggiu a noi pitzinni tzi mandàbani a piglià granchi, cu' la luzi chi vi vurìa pa innischà l'amu pa pischà. Ni pigliàbami unbè e dabboi in casa li punìami drentu a un sacchettu sarraddu i' la cuzina. Un manzanu chi tzi n'érami pisaddi chi era ancora buggiu, candu semmu andaddi a piglià lu sacchettu eddu era bioddu e li granchi giràbani pa tutti l'appusenti, e v'è vurudda più di mez'ora pa accuglinniri tutti.

== Number of speakers ==
The situation of Corsican with regard to French as the country's national language is analogous to that of many other French regions and provinces, which have or used to have a traditional language of their own, even though the islanders' switch from their local idiom to regional French has happened relatively later and the presence of Corsican, albeit declining, is still strongly felt among the population. In 1980, about 70 percent of the island's population "had some command of the Corsican language." In 1990, out of a total population of about 254,000, the percentage had declined to 50 percent, with 10 percent of the island's residents using it as a first language. The language appeared to be in serious decline when the French government reversed its unsupportive stand and initiated some strong measures to save it.

The January 2007 estimated population of Corsica was 281,000, whereas the figure for the March 1999 census, when most of the studies—though not the linguistic survey work referenced in this article—were performed, was about 261,000. Only a fraction of the population at either time spoke Corsican with any fluency.

According to an official survey run on behalf of the Territorial Collectivity of Corsica which took place in April 2013, in Corsica, the Corsican language had a number of speakers between 86,800 and 130,200, out of a total population amounting to 309,693 inhabitants. 28% of the overall population was able to speak Corsican well, while an additional 14% had a capacity to speak it "quite well." The percentage of those who had a solid oral understanding of the language varies between a minimum of 25 percent in the 25–34 age group and the maximum of 65 percent in the over-65 age group: almost a quarter of the former age group reported that they were not able to understand Corsican, while only a small minority of the older people did not understand it. While 32 percent of the population of Northern Corsica was reported to speak Corsican quite well, this percentage dropped to 22 percent for Southern Corsica. Moreover, 10 percent of the population of Corsica spoke only French, while 62 percent code-switched between French and at least some Corsican. 8 percent of the Corsicans knew how to write correctly in Corsican, while about 60 percent of the population did not know how to write in Corsican. While 90 percent of the population was in favor of a Corsican-French bilingualism, 3 percent would have liked to have only Corsican as the official language in the island, and 7 percent would have preferred French to have this role.

A 2022 estimate by the Collectivity of Corsica put the number of Corsican speakers on the island at about 105,000, with roughly a further 30,000 in mainland France and abroad, for a total of some 125,000; the island's population had by then reached about 350,000.

UNESCO classifies Corsican as a "definitely endangered language." The Corsican language is a key vehicle for Corsican culture, which is notably rich in proverbs and in polyphonic song.

== Governmental support ==
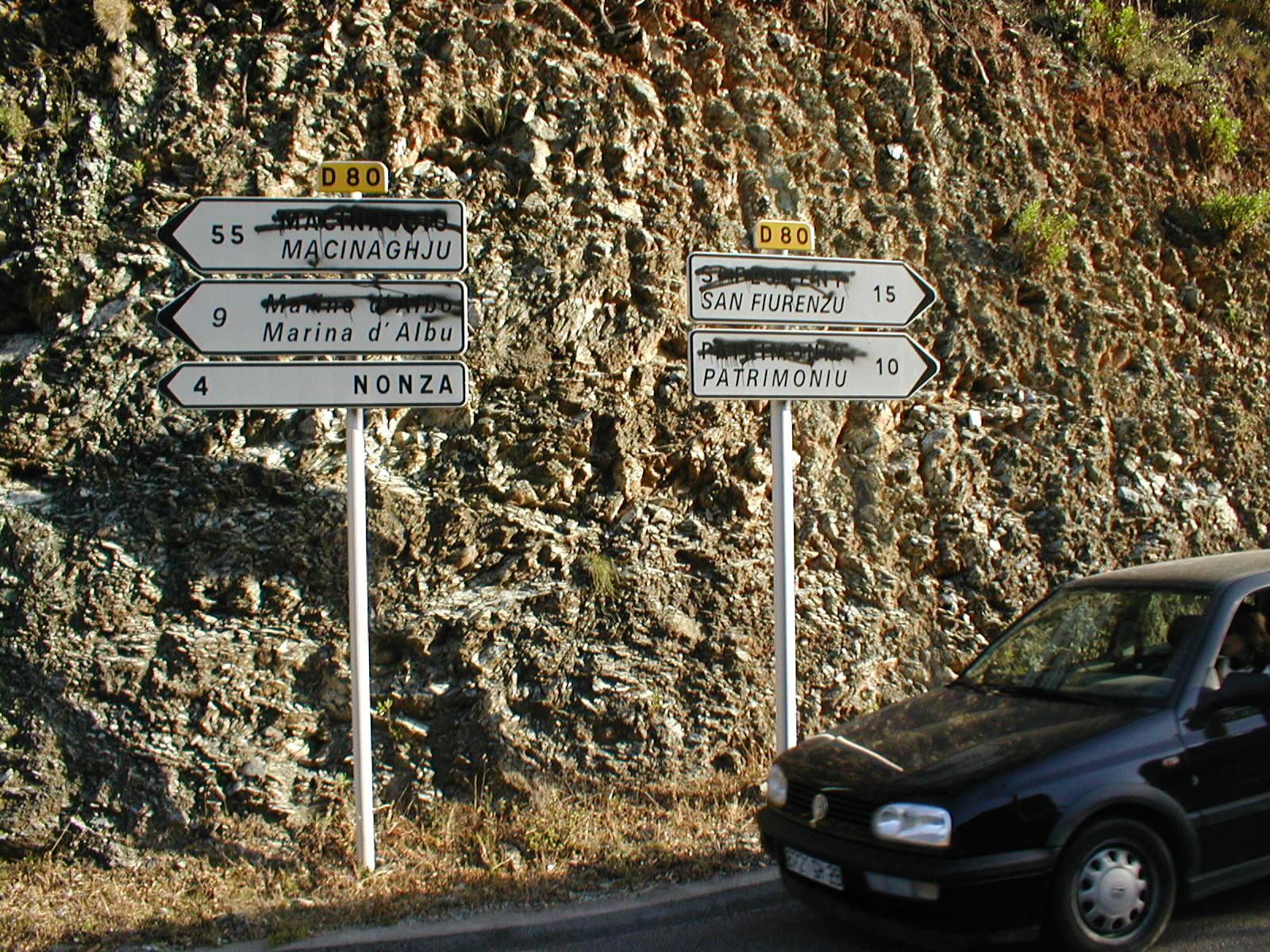
Bilingual road-signs, with the official (IGN) names (often with their roots in Italian) being crossed out by some local nationalists.

When the French Assembly passed the Deixonne Law in 1951, which made it possible for regional languages to be taught at school, Alsatian, Flemish and Corsican were not included on the ground of being classified as dialectes allogènes of German, Dutch and Italian respectively, i.e. dialects of foreign languages and not languages in themselves. Only in 1974 were they too politically recognized as regional languages for their teaching on a voluntary basis.

The 1991 Joxe Statute, in setting up the Collectivité Territoriale de Corse, also provided for the Corsican Assembly, and charged it with developing a plan for the optional teaching of Corsican. The University of Corsica Pasquale Paoli at Corte, Haute-Corse took a central role in the planning.

At the primary school level Corsican is taught up to a fixed number of hours per week (three in the year 2000) and is a voluntary subject at the secondary school level, but is required at the University of Corsica. It is available through adult education. It can be spoken in court or in the conduct of other government business if the officials concerned speak it. The Cultural Council of the Corsican Assembly advocates for its use, for example, on public signs.

In 2023, in a judgement initiated by local prefect and going in opposite direction of recent trends, usage of the Corsican language in French public offices and the regional parliament was legally banned, the existence of the "Corsican people" was also deemed unconstitutional.

== Literature ==
According to the anthropologist Dumenica Verdoni, writing new literature in modern Corsican, known as the Riacquistu, is an integral part of affirming Corsican identity. Some individuals have returned from careers in continental France to write in Corsican, including Dumenicu Togniotti, director of the Teatru Paisanu, which produced polyphonic musicals, 1973–1982, followed in 1980 by Michel Raffaelli's Teatru di a Testa Mora, and Saveriu Valentini's Teatru Cupabbia in 1984. Modern prose writers include Alanu di Meglio, Ghjacumu Fusina, Lucia Santucci, and Marcu Biancarelli.

There were writers working in Corsican in the 1700s and 1800s.

Ferdinand Gregorovius, a 19th-century traveller and enthusiast of Corsican culture, reported that the preferred form of the literary tradition of his time was the vocero, a type of polyphonic ballad originating from funeral obsequies. These laments were similar in form to the chorales of Greek drama except that the leader could improvise. Some performers were noted at this, such as the 1700s Mariola della Piazzole and Clorinda Franseschi. However, the trail of written popular literature of known date in Corsican currently goes no further back than the 17th century. An undated corpus of proverbs from communes may well precede it (see under External links below). Corsican has also left a trail of legal documents ending in the late 12th century. At that time the monasteries held considerable land on Corsica and many of the churchmen were notaries.

Between 1200 and 1425 the monastery of Gorgona, which belonged to the Order of Saint Benedict for much of that time and was in the territory of Pisa, acquired about 40 legal papers of various sorts related to Corsica. As the church was replacing Pisan prelates with Corsican ones there, the legal language shows a transition from entirely Latin through partially Latin and partially Corsican to entirely Corsican. The first known surviving document containing some Corsican is a bill of sale from Patrimonio dated to 1220. These documents were moved to Pisa before the monastery closed its doors and were published there. Research into earlier evidence of Corsican is ongoing.

== Alphabet and spelling ==
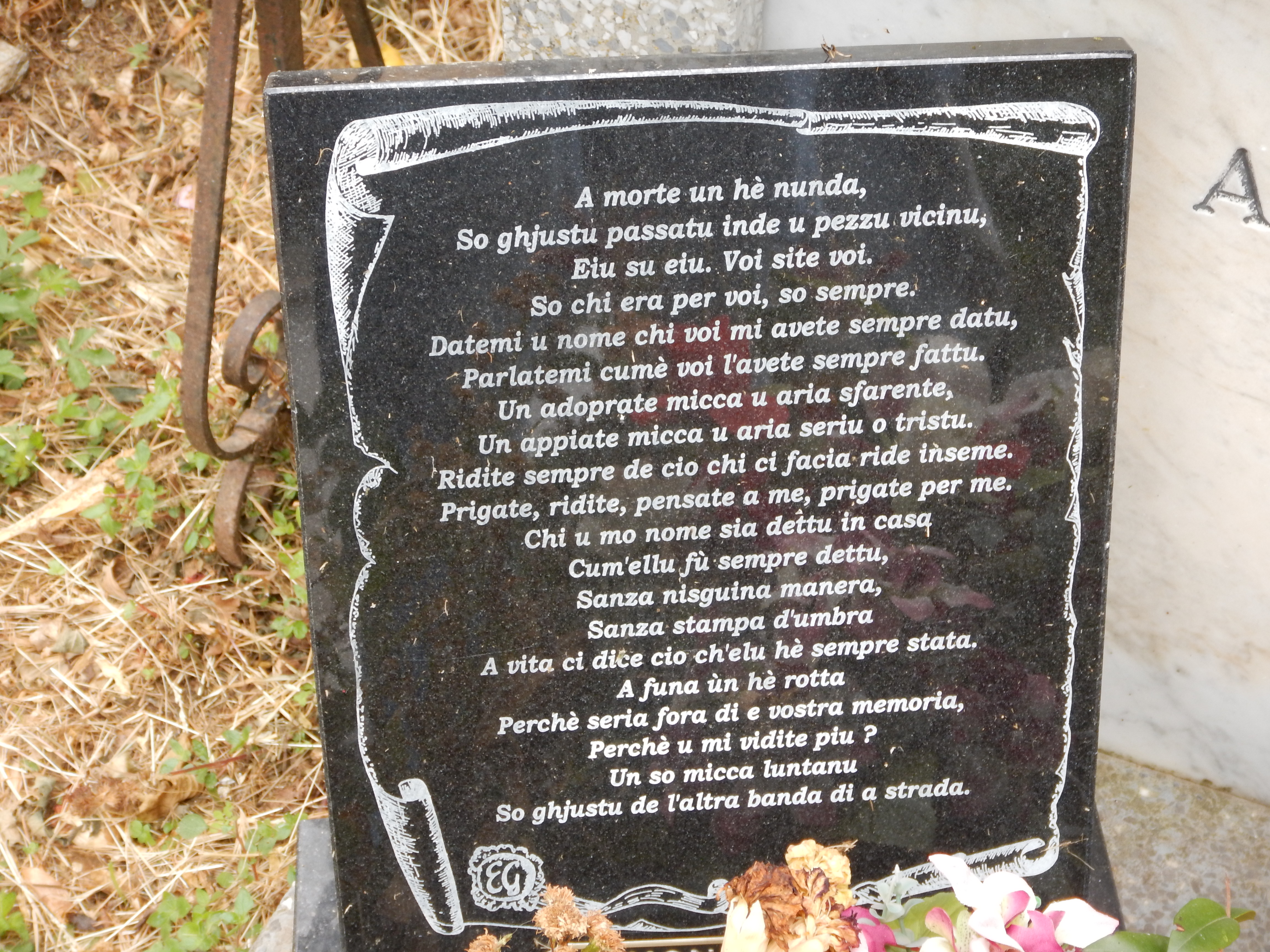
Funerary Inscription in Corsican language at the cemetery of Erbaggio (Nocario)

Corsican is written in the standard Latin script, using 21 of the letters for native words, like in Italian. The letters j, k, w, x, and y are found only in foreign names, still like in Italian, but also in French vocabulary. The digraphs and trigraphs chj, ghj, sc and sg are also defined as "letters" of the alphabet in its modern scholarly form (compare the presence of ch or ll in the old Spanish alphabet) and appear respectively after c, g and s.

The primary diacritic used is the grave accent, indicating word stress when it is not penultimate. In scholarly contexts, disyllables may be distinguished from diphthongs by use of the diaeresis on the former vowel (as in Italian and distinct from French and English). In older writing, the acute accent is sometimes found on stressed ⟨e⟩, the circumflex on stressed ⟨o⟩, indicating respectively (/e/) and (/o/) phonemes.

Corsican has been regarded as a dialect of Italian historically, similar to the Romance lects developed on the Italian peninsula, and in writing, it also resembles Italian (with the generalised substitution of -u for final -o and the articles u and a for il/lo and la respectively; however, both the dialect of Cap Corse and Gallurese retain the original articles lu and la). On the other hand, the phonemes of the modern Corsican dialects have undergone complex and sometimes irregular phenomena depending on phonological context, so the pronunciation of the language for foreigners familiar with other Romance languages is not straightforward.

== Phonology ==
=== Vowels ===
As in Italian, the grapheme ⟨i⟩ appears in some digraphs and trigraphs in which it does not represent the phonemic vowel. All vowels are pronounced except in a few well-defined instances. ⟨i⟩ is not pronounced between ⟨sc/sg/c/g⟩ and ⟨a/o/u⟩: sciarpa [ˈʃarpa]; or initially in some words: istu [ˈstu].

Vowels may be nasalized before ⟨n⟩ (which is assimilated to ⟨m⟩ before ⟨p⟩ or ⟨b⟩) and the palatal nasal consonant represented by ⟨gn⟩. The nasal vowels are represented by the vowel plus ⟨n⟩, ⟨m⟩ or ⟨gn⟩. The combination is a digraph or trigraph indicating the nasalized vowel. The consonant is pronounced in weakened form. The same combination of letters might not be the digraph or trigraph but might be just the non-nasal vowel followed by the consonant at full weight. The speaker must know the difference. Example of nasal: ⟨pane⟩ is pronounced [ˈpãnɛ] and not [ˈpanɛ].

The Northern and central dialects in the vicinity of the Taravo river adopt the Italian seven-vowel system (the Italo-Western type and a unique type where the short high vowels of Latin are uniquely reflected as mid-low vowels), whereas all the Southern ones around the so-called "archaic zone" with its centre being the town of Sartène (including the Gallurese dialect spoken in Northern Sardinia) resort to a five-vowel system without length differentiation, like Sardinian.

The vowel inventory, or collection of phonemic vowels (and the major allophones), transcribed in IPA symbols, is:

Description	Grapheme (Minuscule)	Phoneme	Phone or Allophones	Usage	Example
Open front unrounded Near open	a	/a/	[a] [æ]	Occasional northern	casa [ˈkaza] house carta [ˈkærta] card
Close-mid front unrounded Open-mid; Near-open; Open	e	/e/	[e] [ɛ] [æ] [a]	Inherited as open or close Occasional northern Occasional southern	u celu [uˈd͡ʒelu] the sky ci hè [ˈt͡ʃɛ] there is mercuri ['mærkuri] wednesday terra [ˈtarra] land
Close front unrounded	i	/i/	[i] [j]	1st sound, diphthong	dì ['di] say fiume [ˈfjumɛ] river
Close-mid back rounded Open-mid	o	/o/	[o] [ɔ]	Inherited as open or close	locu [ˈloɡu] place notte [ˈnɔtɛ] night
Close back rounded	u	/u/	[u] [w] [ɥ]	1st sound, diphthong	malu [ˈmalu] bad quassù [kwaˈsu] up there què [ˈkɥɛ] that

=== Consonants ===
		Bilabial	Labio- dental	Alveolar /Dental	Palato- alveolar	Palatal	Velar	
		Bilabial	Labio- dental	Alveolar /Dental	Palato- alveolar	Palatal	plain	labial.
Nasal		m		n		ɲ		
Plosive	voiceless	p		t		c	k	kʷ
Plosive	voiced	b		d		ɟ	ɡ	ɡʷ
Affricate	voiceless			t͡s	t͡ʃ			
Affricate	voiced			d͡z	d͡ʒ			
Fricative	voiceless		f	s	ʃ			
Fricative	voiced	(β)	v	z	ʒ			
Approximant	median					(j)		(w)
Approximant	lateral			l		ʎ		
Trill				r				

== Sample text ==
Article 1 of the Universal Declaration of Human Rights in Corsican:

Nascinu tutti l'omi libari è pari di dignità è di diritti. Pussedinu a raghjoni è a cuscenza è li tocca ad agiscia trà elli di modu fraternu.

Article 1 of the Universal Declaration of Human Rights in English:

All human beings are born free and equal in dignity and rights. They are endowed with reason and conscience and should act towards one another in a spirit of brotherhood.

== See also ==
- Corsican Wikipedia
- Gallurese dialect
- Languages of France
- Paleo-Corsican language
- Sassarese language
