= Fium'Alto =

River in the department of Haute-Corse, Corsica

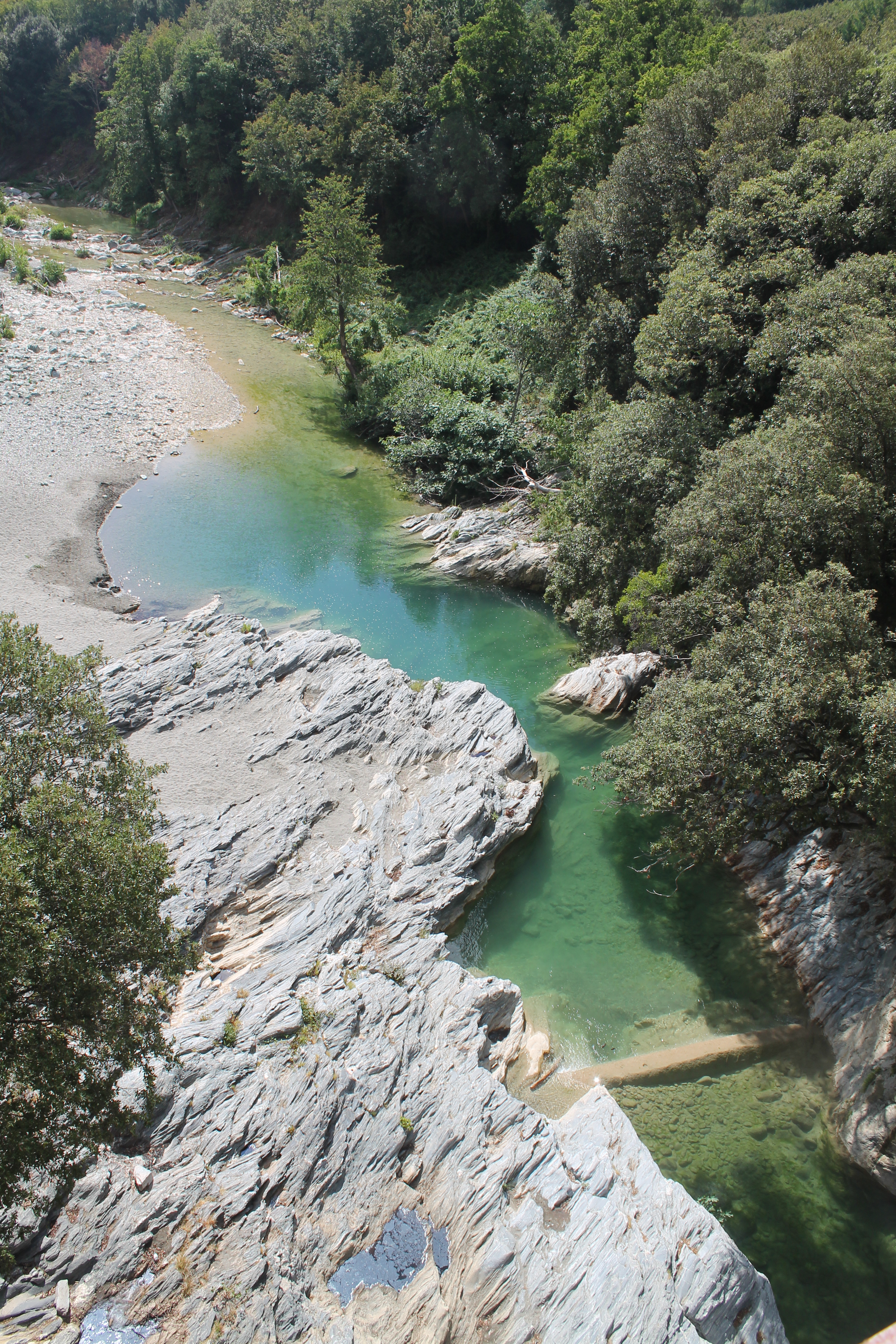
- Fium'Alto from the Acitaja bridge in Penta di Cassinca (Folelli)

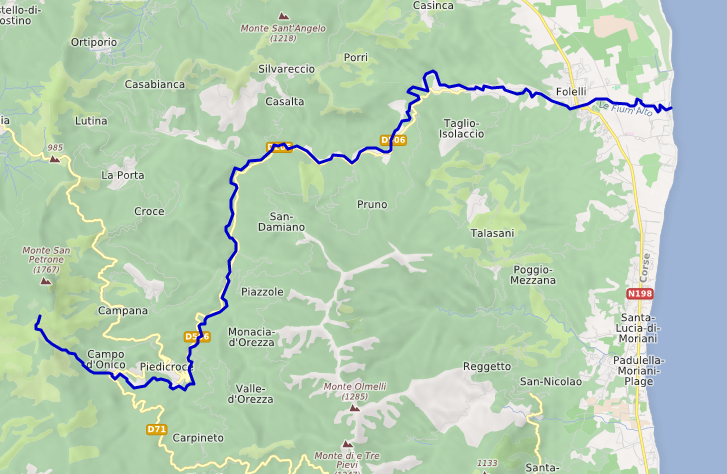
- Course of the Fium'Alto

- Location within Corsica Location within France
- Native name: Fium'Altu (Corsican)

Location
- Country: France
- Region: Corsica
- Department: Haute-Corse

Physical characteristics
- Mouth: Tyrrhenian Sea
  - coordinates: 42.4399°N 9.5413°E

The Fium'Alto (or Fium'Altu) is a small coastal river in the department of Haute-Corse, Corsica, France.

== Course ==
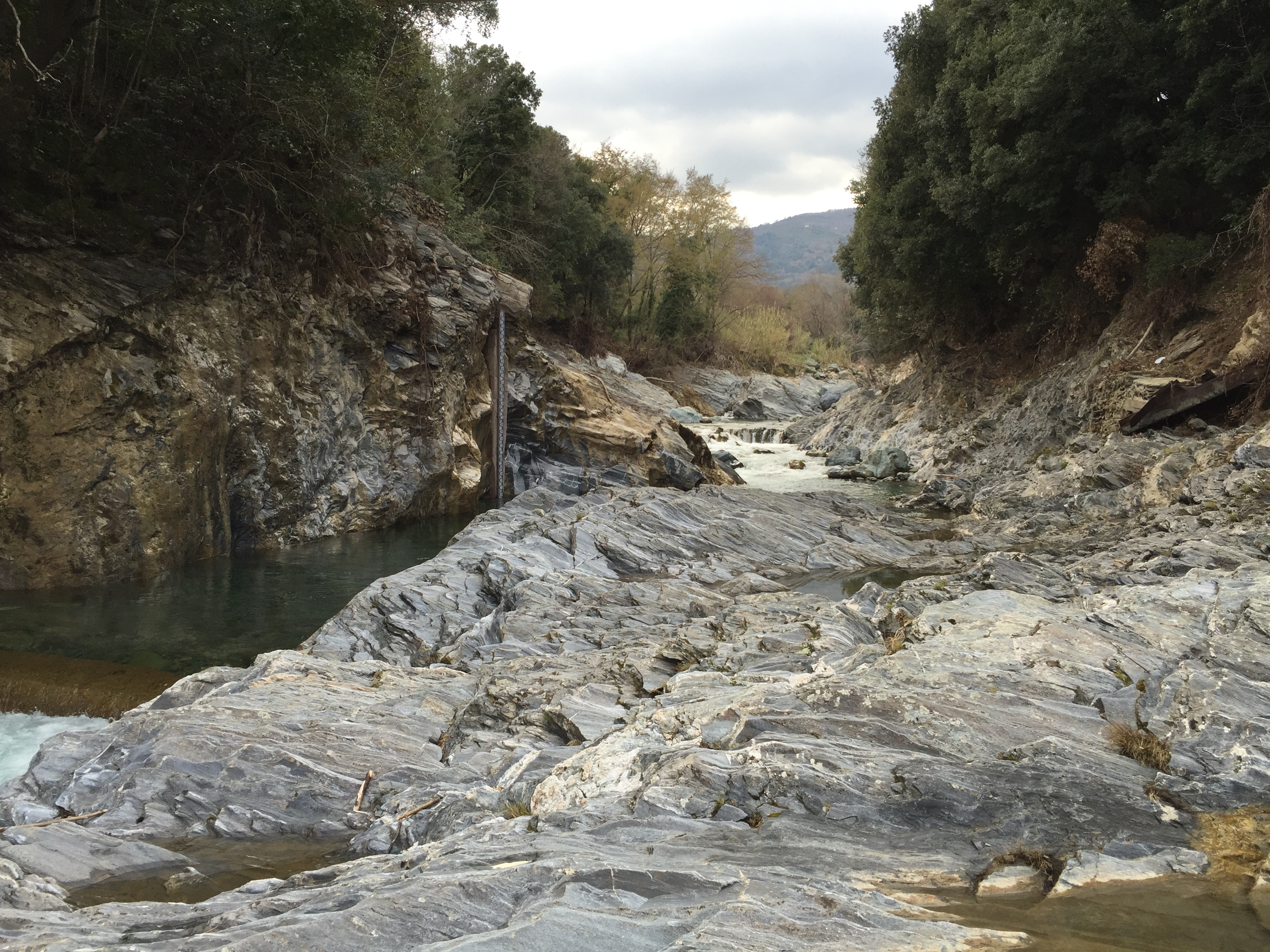
Fium'Alto May 2016

The Fium'Alto is 30.81 kilometres (19.14 mi) long. It crosses the communes of Carcheto-Brustico, Casalta, Croce, Ficaja, Monacia-d'Orezza, Penta-di-Casinca, Piano, Piazzole, Piedicroce, Piedipartino, Pie-d'Orezza, Porri, La Porta, Pruno, Rapaggio, Scata, Stazzona, San-Damiano, San-Gavino-d'Ampugnani and Taglio-Isolaccio.

The Fium'Alto rises to the south of the 1,767 metres (5,797 ft) Monte San Petrone in the commune of Pie d'Orezza. It flows southeast past the village of Pie d'Orezza, east past Piedicroce and Stazzona, then generally north and east to the town of Folelli (Penta-di-Casinca) and the sea. The D71 road follows the upper part of the river, and then the D506 follows it for the remainder of its course.

== Hydrology ==
Measurements of the river flow were taken at the Taglio-Isolaccio Acitaja station from 1960 to 2021. The watershed above this station covers 114 square kilometres (44 sq mi). Annual precipitation was calculated as 383 millimetres (15.1 in). The average flow of water throughout the year was 1.38 cubic metres per second (49 cu ft/s).

Average flow (cubic meters per second) by month for the period 1960 to 2021
Month	Flow
Jan	2.220
Feb	2.420
Mar	2.580
Apr	2.130
May	1.400
Jun	0.722
Jul	0.387
Aug	0.270
Sep	0.373
Oct	0.781
Nov	1.490
Dec	1.860

== Tributaries ==
The following streams (ruisseaux) are tributaries of the Bravone (ordered by length) and sub-tributaries:

- Pozzo Bianco 7 km (4.3 mi)
  - Molaghina 3 km (1.9 mi)
    - Arche 3 km (1.9 mi)
      - Cagnolo et de Teja 3 km (1.9 mi)
      - Lavatoio et de Noceta 2 km (1.2 mi)
        - Terciola 1 km (0.62 mi)
      - Penta 1 km (0.62 mi)
  - Forcione 3 km (1.9 mi)
    - Porcili 1 km (0.62 mi)
  - Chiarello 2 km (1.2 mi)
  - Funtana 1 km (0.62 mi)
  - Alzeta 1 km (0.62 mi)
  - Vetuste 1 km (0.62 mi)
- Andegno 5 km (3.1 mi)
  - Verbicina 3 km (1.9 mi)
  - Mustaco 3 km (1.9 mi)
  - Pollace 2 km (1.2 mi)
  - Acquanili 1 km (0.62 mi)
  - Nicchiosa 1 km (0.62 mi)
  - Rossi 1 km (0.62 mi)
- Polveroso 5 km (3.1 mi)
  - San Pancrazio 5 km (3.1 mi)
    - San Fiumento 3 km (1.9 mi)
      - Tigliola 3 km (1.9 mi)
        - Lavatoghio 1 km (0.62 mi)
      - Falongo 1 km (0.62 mi)
  - Croce 1 km (0.62 mi)
  - Funtana Maio 1 km (0.62 mi)
- Migliarine 4 km (2.5 mi)
- Isola 3 km (1.9 mi)
  - Palatina 1 km (0.62 mi)
  - Carpinete 1 km (0.62 mi)
- Chiaraggio 3 km (1.9 mi)
  - Ortale 1 km (0.62 mi)
- Piedipartino 3 km (1.9 mi)
  - Rustaggio 3 km (1.9 mi)
- Volta 3 km (1.9 mi)
  - Porri 1 km (0.62 mi)
- Onda 3 km (1.9 mi)
- Fioraccio 3 km (1.9 mi)
  - Somerino 2 km (1.2 mi)
    - San Marcello 1 km (0.62 mi)
- Scaffone 3 km (1.9 mi)
- La Foata 3 km (1.9 mi)
- Navacchi 2 km (1.2 mi)
- Piazzi 2 km (1.2 mi)
- Rividaldo 2 km (1.2 mi)
- Piano 2 km (1.2 mi)
- Acqua Riola 2 km (1.2 mi)
- Padulelle 2 km (1.2 mi)
- Falasco 2 km (1.2 mi)
- Cogno Lello 1 km (0.62 mi)
- Onda al Diavole 1 km (0.62 mi)
- Finosa 1 km (0.62 mi)
- Acqua Merla 1 km (0.62 mi)
- Aja a e Calle 1 km (0.62 mi)
- Aja Alle Porte 1 km (0.62 mi)
- Colombino 1 km (0.62 mi)
- Mugliani 1 km (0.62 mi)
- Forcione 1 km (0.62 mi)
- Suare Calle 1 km (0.62 mi)
- Campo d'Arietto 1 km (0.62 mi)
- Padule 1 km (0.62 mi)
- Trovoli 1 km (0.62 mi)
- Aja Rossa 1 km (0.62 mi)
- Pisciancone 1 km (0.62 mi)

== Sources ==
- "Le Fium-Alto à Taglio-Isolaccio [Acitaja]", eaufrance (in French), Ministère de l'Ecologie, du Développement Durable et de l'Energie
- "Le Fium Alto", Sandre (in French)
- "Relation: Fium'Alto (7390872)", OpenStreetMap
