= Tavagna =

Piève of Corsica

Tavagna is a former Corsican piève. Located in northeast Corsica, it belonged to the province of Bastia in political terms and the diocese of Mariana in religious terms.

== Geography ==
The land of Tavagna corresponded to the territories of the communes of:

- Taglio-Isolaccio,
- Talasani,
- Pero-Casevecchie,
- Poggio-Mezzana,
- Velone-Orneto.

== Church ==
The church, or "piève" of Tavagna was the church of San Ghjuvanni Battista, located in the municipality of Poggio-Mezzana. Today, the church has been completely renovated. According to Geneviève Moracchini-Mazel, there is no longer any way to detect older parts in today's masonry.
