= Velone-Orneto =

- Commune
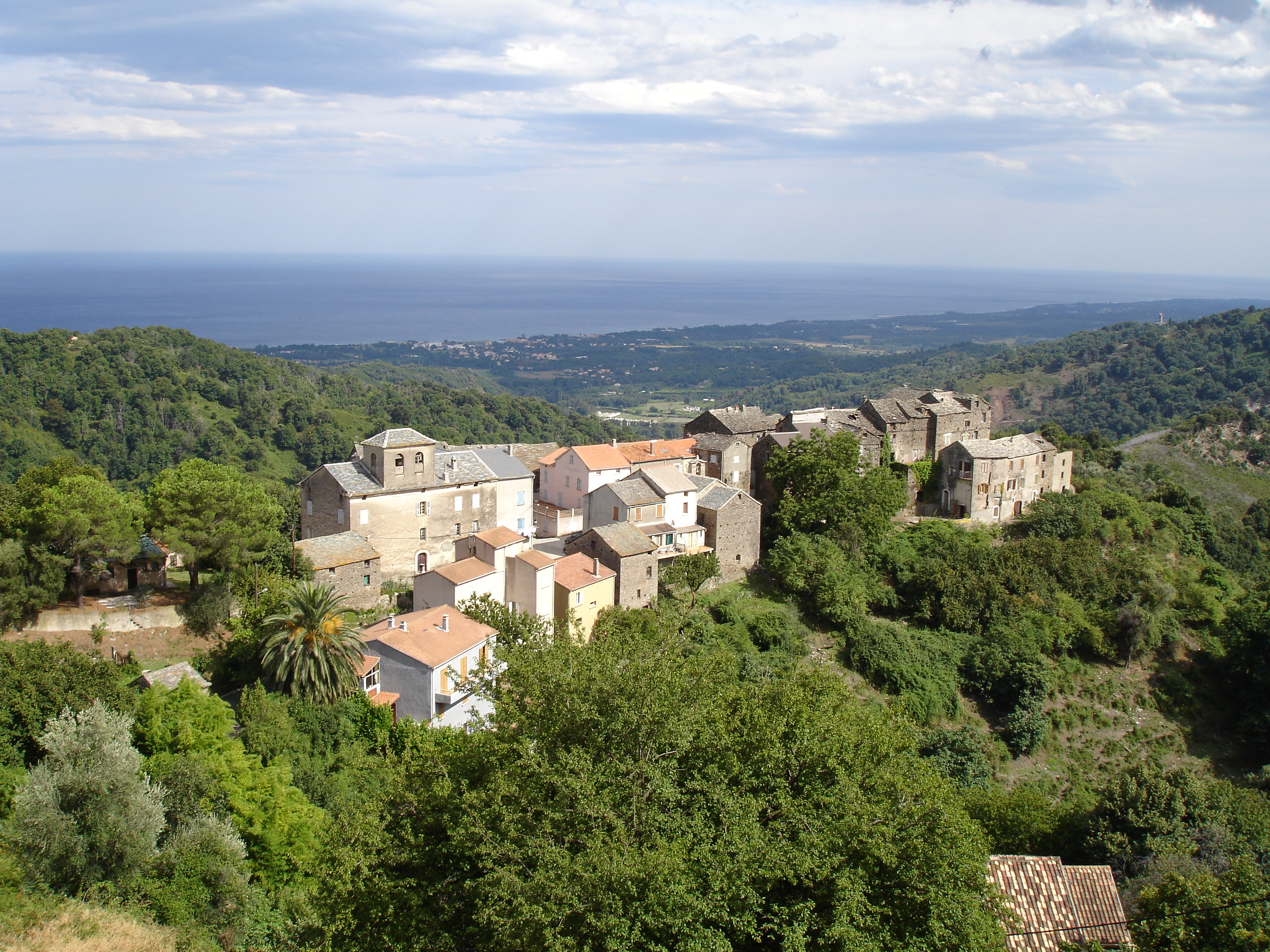
- A view of the hamlet of Orneto
- Location of Velone-Orneto
- Location within France Location within Corsica
- Coordinates: 42°24′06″N 9°28′18″E
- Country: France
- Region: Corsica
- Department: Haute-Corse
- Arrondissement: Corte
- Canton: Castagniccia
- Intercommunality: Costa Verde

Government
  - Mayor (2020–2026): Jean-Marie Pallenti
- Area^{1}: 12.34 km^{2} (4.76 sq mi)
- Elevation: 300 m (980 ft)
- Highest elevation: 1,247 m (4,091 ft)
- Lowest elevation: 102 m (335 ft)
- Population (2023): 101
  - Density: 8.18/km^{2} (21.2/sq mi)
- Time zone: UTC+01:00 (CET)
  - Summer (DST): UTC+02:00 (CEST)
- INSEE/Postal code: 2B340 /20230
- ^{1} French Land Register data, which excludes lakes, ponds, glaciers > 1 km^{2} (0.386 sq mi or 247 acres) and river estuaries.

Velone-Orneto is a commune in the Haute-Corse department of France on the island of Corsica.

== Geography ==
The municipality of Velone-Orneto is located about forty miles south of Bastia, and is part of the Tavagna (Haute-Corse), with four other municipalities: Taglio-Isolaccio, Pero-Casevecchie, Talasani and Poggio-Mezzana. Six hamlets composing the municipality: Orneto, Carbonaccia, Velone, Inelaccia, Fiuminale Suttanu and Fiuminale Supranu (the latter three have been abandoned).

== Population ==
Historical population
| Year | Pop. | ±% p.a. |
|---|---|---|
| 1968 | 178 | — |
| 1975 | 124 | −5.03% |
| 1982 | 113 | −1.32% |
| 1990 | 109 | −0.45% |
| 1999 | 113 | +0.40% |
| 2007 | 110 | −0.34% |
| 2012 | 110 | +0.00% |
| 2017 | 117 | +1.24% |
| 2023 | 101 | −2.42% |
Source: INSEE

== See also ==
- Communes of the Haute-Corse department
