= Gian Paolo Borghetti =

French writer and politician (1816–1897)

- Born: 23 June 1816; Talasani, Corsica, France
- Died: 4 November 1897 (aged 81); Bastia, Corsica, France
- Citizenship: France
- Education: Medicine
- Occupations: Writer, poet, politician
- Writing career
- Language: Italian, French
- Movement: Romanticism

Gian Paolo Borghetti (Corsican: Ghjuvan-Paulu Borghetti, French: Jean-Paul Borghetti, 23 June 1816 – 4 November 1897) was a Corsican writer, poet and politician. He has been described as "one of the greatest Corsican poets writing in Italian", and "one of the most brilliant Corsican intellectuals of the nineteenth century".

== Early life ==
Gian Paolo Borghetti was born in Talasani, Corsica on 23 June 1816 into one of the most illustrious families of the Tavagna region whose members, related to Luiggi Giafferi, had particularly distinguished themselves in the reign of King Theodore and at the time of Pasquale Paoli. He studied medicine in Pisa from 1835 to 1839, and upon qualification returned to Corsica. In 1841 he enrolled in the French navy as a ship's surgeon, and in this function travelled the Mediterranean and Atlantic until the beginning of 1848.

== Political career ==
At the announcement of the February Revolution he resigned his post and settled in Bastia, where he entered the political arena. Much influenced by his book Histoire des Girondins, Borghetti was a great admirer of Lamartine. In the first elections held under universal (male) suffrage on 13 and 14 May 1849 he was elected Conseiller Général of his home Canton of Pero-Casevecchie. Not one who was easily willing to compromise his ideals, he quickly became disappointed to see political intrigue and clientelism prevail over the general interest, and allowed himself to be replaced as Conseiller Général by one of his friends, justice of the peace Octavian Renucci, who kept the post until the end of the Second Empire. After the coup d'état of 2 December 1851, he abandoned public life. From 1849 to 1870, Borghetti remained in opposition to the regime. Unlike many others in his position he was not sent into exile, but he was frequently the subject of administrative harassment. When the Second Empire collapsed in 1870, Borghetti once again found favour with the authorities and was appointed (in Ajaccio) Chief of Staff of the new Prefect Dumenicu Francescu Ceccaldi.

== Journalism ==
Having contributed to the journal Progressive de la Corse (Bastia) in 1848, in the following year he founded his own newspaper La Corsica, written in Italian to be better understood by the population. The newspaper openly criticized the foreign policy of Louis Napoleon, which led to its being closed down after only five issues.

He later became editor-in-chief of Le Golo (1869), Bulletin Officiel de la Corse (1870-1871), La République (1871-1872), La Solidarité (1879-1885), and Colombo, and founded the journals Le Républicain de la Corse (1871), Le Démocrate de la Corse (1871), and La Concorde (1880).

== Poetry ==
While his professional and political activities often took precedence over his literary work during his lifetime, Gian Paolo Borghetti is today primarily remembered as one of the greatest Corsican poets writing in Italian.

Much of his poetry was inspired by his republican convictions. In 1848 he composed a canto lirico in honour of Lamartine of whom he was a great admirer, and was rewarded with the personal thanks of the head of the provisional government of the Second Republic. In the same year he praised the new Republic in a poem of six verses entitled Alla libertà, the first stanza of which presents obvious analogies with La Marseillaise, in which he speaks of the bitterly regained freedom that might soon reach the other peoples of Europe, beginning with neighbouring Italy.

Another major source of inspiration was il Risorgimento. In 1859 he published A Vittorio Emanuele II, celebrating Victor Emmanuel II, and one of his most importants poems, the 1018 verse Giuseppe Garibaldi (episodio della guerra per l’indipendenza italiana), first published in 1927, contributed in an original way to the creation of the Garibaldian myth. Not least of his achievements in this area was the composition of a version of Camicia rossa Garibaldina for which he was personally thanked by Garibaldi himself.

In May 1869, to commemorate the centenary of the Battle of Ponte Novu (in which his grandfather had fought and been seriously injured) he published, in several installments in the Bastia weekly Phare de la Corse, a vast poetic fresco consisting of fourteen canti entitled Pasquale Paoli.

== Other activities ==
From 1870 to 1871 Borghetti was Departmental Archivist of Corsica and editor-in-chief of the Bulletin Officiel de la Corse, and from 1878 to 1894 he was Director of Public Health in Bastia.

He was also co-founder in December 1880, and secretary for the following fifteen years, of La Société des Sciences historiques et naturelles de la Corse.

== Political ideas, personal philosophy and character ==
A convinced republican, Gian Paolo Borghetti was equally inspired by the Christian and humanist traditions. His political ideas are those of Giuseppe Mazzini: God and the People, Humanity and the Republic. In the first installment of La Corsica, the newspaper he founded in 1849, Borghetti offers his readers a long reflection entitled La Repubblica e la religione cristiana where he shows all the affinities between the teachings of Christ and those advocated by the new Republic.

Politically, he oscillated between the desire to see the island remain in a France converted to federalism and the wish to see Corsica integrated with a special administration into a hypothetical "Federal Republic of Italy". Having spent much of his life defending the use of the Italian language and advocating the union of Corsica with Italy, he arose in 1870 as a vehement defender of a French and Republican Corsica against those (Henri Rochefort and Georges Clemenceau, for example) who, after the Battle of Sedan, wanted to cede Corsica to Italy. What was constant in the life of Borghetti, however, was his love of Corsica and no less firm attachment to the idea of democracy as the only form of government compatible with modern political ideas of universality, freedom and justice.

His character has been described as being "at the same time impulsive and rigid, and often excessive because his polemical thrusts were hard. But he was sincere and disinterested, even if his views were extreme and their expression little disposed to compromise." Enjoying great popularity in the north of Corsica and having many useful political connections in the south, he could have aspired to a career at national level rather than limiting himself to the position of Conseiller Général in the elections of 1849, and having attained that position he could easily have used it for his own advancement, in a society which not only accepted but expected nothing else from those in public office. In both cases, however, he chose the general interest above personal profit.

== Personal life and final years ==
He had three sons and five daughters by his first wife Pauline Hyacinthe Salvatelli, who died in 1862. He married Delphine Louise Ciavaldini in 1878, and had a further three daughters and one son. All his sons and four of his daughters died during his lifetime. In October 1868 he lost his second son Eugenio, who was barely twenty years old, and this tragic loss inspired his poem In morte di mio figlio Eugenio.

In 1894, Borghetti lost the position he had held since 1878 as Director of Public Health in Bastia when David Raynal, Minister of the Interior of the Government of Jean Casimir-Perier (considered by the Radicals and Socialists as the président de la réaction), expressed his astonishment that "the Health Service in Bastia had been entrusted to an enemy of France!". For Borghetti this was the beginning of a terrible old age spent at the edge of poverty. He died in Bastia on 4 November 1897 in the most profound indifference. Few people attended his funeral, which was held in the small Capannelle chapel in Bastia.

== Bibliography ==
=== Poetry ===
- Il Poeta esule italiano. Bastia: stamp. Fabiani. 1847. p. 30.
- A Niccolò Tommasèo, canto di G. P. Borghetti. Bastia: Fabiani. 1847. p. 10.
- A Lamartine, Canto lirico di G. P. Borghetti. Bastia: Leonetti. 1848. p. 16.
- A Sua Maestà Vittorio Emmanuele II, re di Sardegna, ec. ec., ode di G. P. Borghetti. Bastia: Fabiani. 1859. p. 8.
- In Occasione dei sponsali del signor Filippo Marchetti colla signora Felicina Fernandi, ode di G. P. Borghetti. Bastia: Fabiani. 1873. p. 8.
- Giuseppe Garibaldi. Episodio della guerra per l'indipendenza italiana. Livorno: Raffaello Giusti (Edizioni de Il Giornale di politica e di letteratura). 1927. p. 44.
- Pasquale Paoli: Episodio dell'ultima guerra dell'indipendenza corsa (Etude critique de Francesco Guerri). Livorno: Chiappini (Edizioni di "Corsica antica e moderna"). 1938. p. 99.

=== Essays ===
- "Etude sur la Corse". L'Aigle Corse (Bastia: Ollagnier). From N°39 (15 February 1867) onwards.
- "Le Cinq Mai, étude historique sur Napoléon". L'Aigle Corse (Bastia: Ollagnier). From 15 May 1868 onwards.
- La Corse et ses détracteurs. Bastia: Ollagnier. 1870. p. 48.
- Le Bonapartisme dévoilé, ou Pages d'Histoire Contemporaine. Bastia. 1878. p. 80.

=== Unpublished works ===
- Souvenirs ou Histoire de deux ans passés en Italie (1833-1835), novel.
- Poésie varié anacréontique (1834 à 1837).
- Amore, gloria e sventura (subject taken from the history of Corsica).
- Ubaldo, poema epico (subject inspired by the history of Aleria).
- Sampiero Corso, poema eroico.
- Inno di guerra dei corsi.
- (Poems in Italian: Le voce interne. Ore perdute. La Musa. Ode a l’amicizia).

Two poems, a newspaper article and extracts of La Corse et ses détracteurs are included in "Anthologie des écrivains corses" by Hyacinthe YVIA-CROCE, Editions Cyrnos et Méditerranée, Ajaccio, 1987, volume 2, (pp. 68–76).
