= Pruno (disambiguation) =

Pruno is an alcoholic beverage made from apples and/or oranges.

Pruno may also refer to:

== Places ==
=== France ===
- Pruno, Haute-Corse, a commune on Corsica

=== Italy ===
- Pruno (Cilento), a rural village in the comunes of Valle dell'Angelo and Laurino, and a big rural area in the middle of Cilento (Province of Salerno, Campania)
- Pruno (Stazzema), a hamlet (frazione) in the comune of Stazzema (Province of Lucca, Tuscany)

== Biology ==
- Prunoideae, a subfamily of plants belonging to the family of Rosaceae
- Prunus, a genus of plants belonging to the family of Rosaceae

== Other ==
- "Pruno", a Stone Temple Pilots song from the album No. 4
