= Frédéric Antonetti =

French football manager (born 1961)

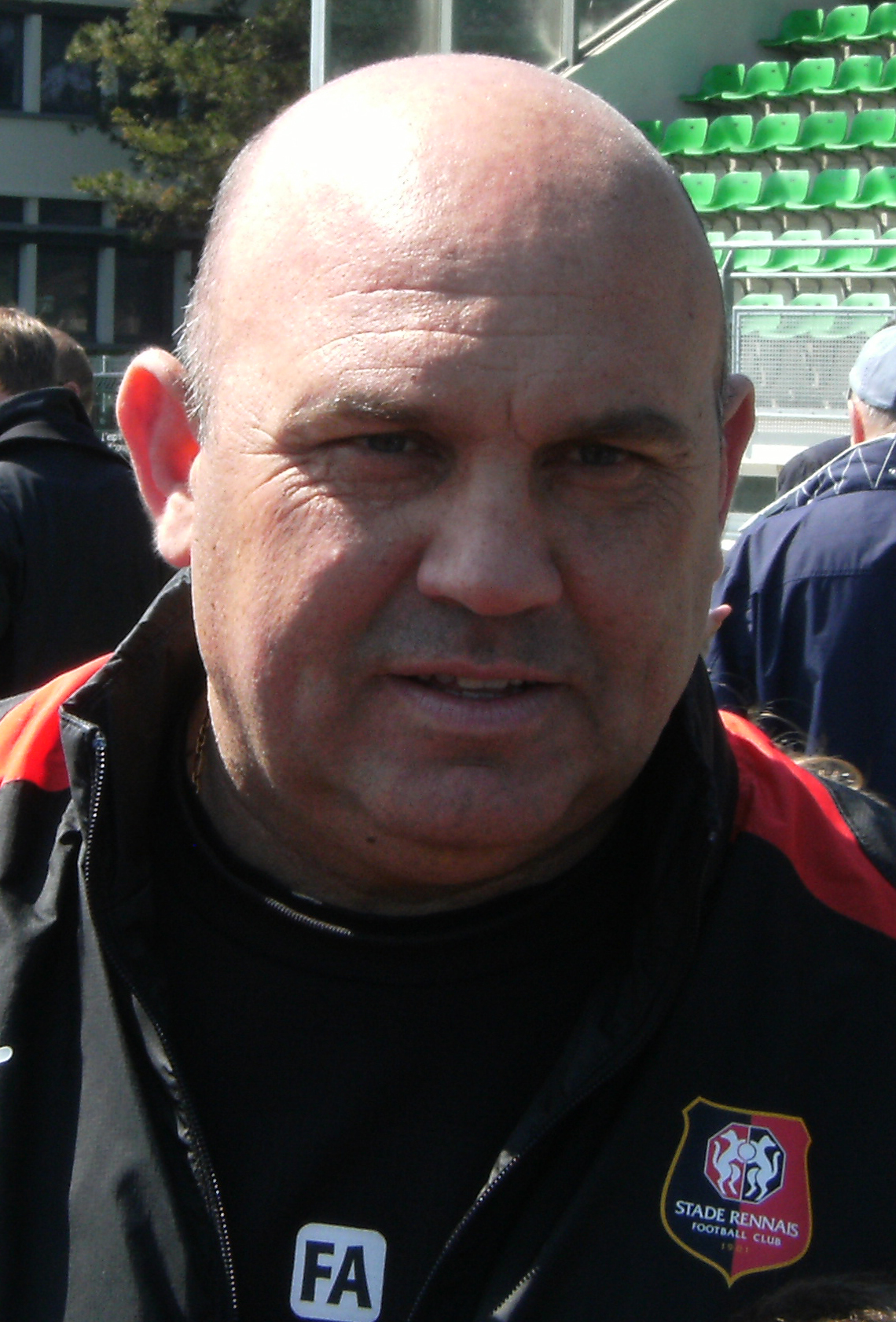
- Antonetti as Rennes manager in 2013

Personal information
- Full name: Frédéric Antonetti
- Date of birth: 19 August 1961 (age 65)
- Place of birth: Venzolasca, Haute-Corse, France
- Position: Midfielder

Youth career
- 1972–1973: Vescovato
- 1973–1979: Bastia
- 1979–1982: Vichy

Senior career*
Years	Team	Apps	(Gls)
1982–1983	Bastia	2	(0)
1983–1985	Béziers	64	(6)
1985–1987	Le Puy	54	(0)
1987–1990	Bastia	53	(6)
Total		173	(12)

Managerial career
- 1990–1994: Bastia (youth)
- 1994–1998: Bastia
- 1998–1999: Gamba Osaka
- 1999–2001: Bastia
- 2001–2004: Saint-Étienne
- 2005–2009: Nice
- 2009–2013: Rennes
- 2015–2016: Lille
- 2018–2019: Metz
- 2020–2022: Metz
- 2023: Strasbourg
- * Club domestic league appearances and goals

Frédéric Antonetti (born 19 August 1961) is a French professional football manager and former player who was most recently the manager of French club Strasbourg. He previously managed Bastia, Gamba Osaka, Saint-Étienne, Nice, Rennes and Lille.

== Early life ==
Antonetti was born in Venzolasca, Haute-Corse.

== Managerial career ==
=== Bastia ===
Following the end of his career in 1990, Antonetti later began managing his former club, Corsican Division 1 side Bastia on youth level before taking charge of the senior team in 1994. In his four years at the club, he guided them to the Coupe de la Ligue final in 1995, losing 2–0 against Paris Saint-Germain.

=== Gamba Osaka ===
In May 1998, Antonetti moved abroad to Japan to become the new manager of J.League side Gamba Osaka. However, due to poor results, he was sacked in June 1999.

=== Return to Bastia ===
Antonetti took charge of Bastia as manager for the second time in June 1999, succeeding José Pasqualetti.

=== Saint-Étienne ===
On 7 October 2001, Antonetti was revealed as the new manager of Saint-Étienne, penning a three-year deal. When he took over the reins of Les Verts, the club was in Ligue 2. Antonetti led Saint-Étienne to promotion to Ligue 1 in 2004 and helped them reach the semi-finals of the Coupe de la Ligue, where they were knocked out by eventual winners Sochaux with 2–3. He left the club in June 2004, having been in charge for three seasons.

=== Nice ===
In May 2005, Antonetti became the manager of Ligue 1 side Nice. In 2006, he managed Nice to the Coupe de la Ligue final against Nancy, but were defeated 2–1. He left the club at the end of the season in 2009 after four years in charge.

=== Rennes ===
On 2 June 2009, Antonetti joined Ligue 1 club Rennes. After four years in charge of the club, he left by mutual consent. Antonetti later said of the club in 2017: “Rennes is like Canada Dry, it has the colour of a large club, but it’s not". He also spoke of his relationship with the club's president saying “With François Pinault, physically, we saw each other twice a year, once at the beginning of the season, another time in the middle, and then he came to the stadium with one or two matches".

=== Lille ===
On 22 November 2015, Antonetti was appointed as the manager of Lille in place of Hervé Renard, signing a three-year contract. When he took over, Lille was in 17th place in the Ligue 1 table. His first competitive match was a Ligue 1 away match against Angers on 28 November, which ended in a 2–0 defeat. After struggling during the first three months, Lille finished the season superbly, finishing fifth in Ligue 1 and runners-up in the Coupe de la Ligue final to Paris Saint-Germain after being beaten 2–1 in the 2015–16 season. In August 2016, Antonetti signed an extension to his contract that would tie him to the club until 30 June 2020.

On 22 November 2016, the club announced that they had parted company with Antonetti and that he had agreed to leave "in a friendly manner". Antonetti received a severance payout of approximately €840,000, which was equivalent to seven months of his gross monthly wages of €120,000. At the time of his departure, Lille was languishing in 19th place in the league, second from bottom in the 2016–17 season. They were also eliminated at the first hurdle of the UEFA Europa League in the third qualifying round against Gabala, where they were eliminated 2–1 on aggregate.

=== Metz ===
On 24 May 2018, Antonetti was revealed as the new manager of Ligue 2 side Metz, who had just been relegated from Ligue 1. In his first season, he secured promotion back to Ligue 1 following a 2–1 victory over Red Star.

On 18 May 2019, club president Bernard Serin announced that Antonetti would not continue as manager for the 2019–20 season because of personal reasons and was instead handed a role as general manager, with his assistant Vincent Hognon taking over the managerial post. Antonetti later returned to Metz for the 2020-21 season which saw the club finish 10th. On 22 February 2022, Antonetti was involved in a fight following the full-time whistle with Lille's sporting director Sylvain Armand. Antonetti was later given a ten-match touchline ban over the incident. On 7 June 2022, Antonetti agreed to step down as Metz manager by mutual consent.

=== Strasbourg ===
On 14 February 2023, Antonetti was appointed manager at Strasbourg with the side battling relegation. Following the clubs survival in Ligue 1, Antonetti's contract was not extended. Antonetti said in a statement “I am happy to have been able to train such a club. I shared wonderful moments there with an exemplary and passionate public who always backed us in victory as in defeat”, Antonetti said. “A new era is coming with the arrival of new investors who will provide the club with new resources. In this changing Ligue 1, which is undergoing profound upheavals, I wish them much success. The people of Strasbourg deserve it".

== Managerial statistics ==
As of match played 3 June 2023

Managerial record by team and tenure
Team	From	To	Record								
Team	From	To	P	W	D	L	GF	GA	GD	Win %	Ref.
Bastia	2 October 1994	13 May 1998	165	64	45	56	204	195	+9	38.79	
Gamba Osaka	14 May 1998	1 June 1999	44	17	0	27	67	81	−14	38.64	
Bastia	1 June 1999	19 May 2001	78	30	18	30	105	90	+15	38.46	
Saint-Étienne	7 October 2001	2 June 2004	120	55	30	35	129	106	+23	45.83	
Nice	24 May 2005	18 May 2009	171	62	55	54	173	165	+8	36.26	
Rennes	2 June 2009	30 May 2013	183	75	43	65	250	215	+35	40.98	
Lille	22 November 2015	22 November 2016	45	19	11	15	51	43	+8	42.22	
Metz	24 May 2018	18 May 2019	46	28	11	7	71	31	+40	60.87	
Metz	12 October 2020	9 June 2022	74	18	25	31	79	112	−33	24.32	
Strasbourg	13 February 2023	27 June 2023	15	6	4	5	23	18	+5	40.00	
Total			941	374	242	325	1,152	1,056	+96	39.74	

== Honours ==
Bastia

- Coupe de la Ligue runner-up: 1994–95
- UEFA Intertoto Cup: 1997

Saint-Étienne

- Ligue 2: 2003–04

Nice

- Coupe de la Ligue runner-up: 2005–06

Rennes

- Coupe de la Ligue runner-up: 2012–13

Lille

- Coupe de la Ligue runner-up: 2015–16

Metz

- Ligue 2: 2018–19
