= Torra di San Pellegrinu =

Genoese coastal defence tower in Corsica

Tower of San Pellegrinu
- Torra di San Pellegrinu (Corsican)
- Location within Corsica
- 42°27′1″N 9°32′28″E

History
- Built: Second half of 16th century

The Tower of San Pellegrinu (Corsican: Torra di San Pellegrinu) was a Genoese tower located in the commune of Penta-di-Casinca on the east coast of the Corsica.

The tower was built in the sixteenth century sometime before 1573. It was one of a series of coastal defences constructed by the Republic of Genoa between 1530 and 1620 to stem the attacks by Barbary pirates. The Tower of San Pellegrinu was demolished by the Genoese in 1762 to prevent it falling into the hands of the rebel forces led by Pasquale Paoli.

In 2003 the tower was added to the "General Inventory of Cultural Heritage" maintained by the French Ministry of Culture.

== See also ==
- List of Genoese towers in Corsica
