= Casabianca, Haute-Corse =

Casabianca A Casabianca
- Commune
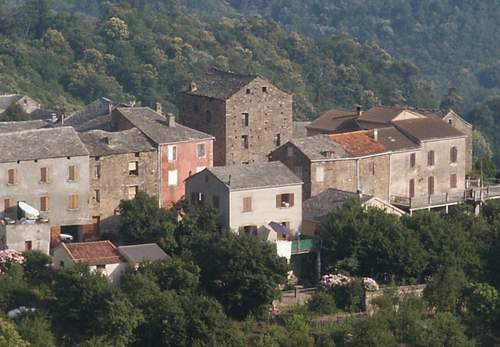
- A general view of Casabianca
- Location of Casabianca
- Location within France Location within Corsica
- Coordinates: 42°26′50″N 9°21′50″E
- Country: France
- Region: Corsica
- Department: Haute-Corse
- Arrondissement: Corte
- Canton: Casinca-Fumalto

Government
  - Mayor (2020–2026): Fernand Vincentelli
- Area^{1}: 3.68 km^{2} (1.42 sq mi)
- Elevation: 630 m (2,070 ft)
- Highest elevation: 1,000 m (3,300 ft)
- Lowest elevation: 388 m (1,273 ft)
- Population (2023): 123
  - Density: 33.4/km^{2} (86.6/sq mi)
- Time zone: UTC+01:00 (CET)
  - Summer (DST): UTC+02:00 (CEST)
- INSEE/Postal code: 2B069 /20237
- ^{1} French Land Register data, which excludes lakes, ponds, glaciers > 1 km^{2} (0.386 sq mi or 247 acres) and river estuaries.

Casabianca (Italian pronunciation: [kazaˈbjaŋka]; also Corsican: A Casabianca) is a commune in the French department of Haute-Corse, collectivity and island of Corsica.

== Population ==
Historical population
Year	Pop.	±% p.a.
1968	72	—
1975	57	−3.28%
1982	57	+0.00%
1990	36	−5.58%
1999	68	+7.32%
2007	81	+2.21%
2012	94	+3.02%
2017	84	−2.22%
2023	123	+6.56%
Source: INSEE

== See also ==
- Communes of the Haute-Corse department
