= Église Sainte-Marguerite de Carcheto-Brustico =

Church in Haute-Corse, France

Coordinates: 42°22′0″N 9°22′4″E

Église Sainte-Marguerite de Carcheto-Brustico is a Roman Catholic church in Carcheto-Brustico, Haute-Corse, Corsica. The 17th-18th century building was classified as a Historic Monument in 1976.
