= Loreto-di-Casinca =

- Commune
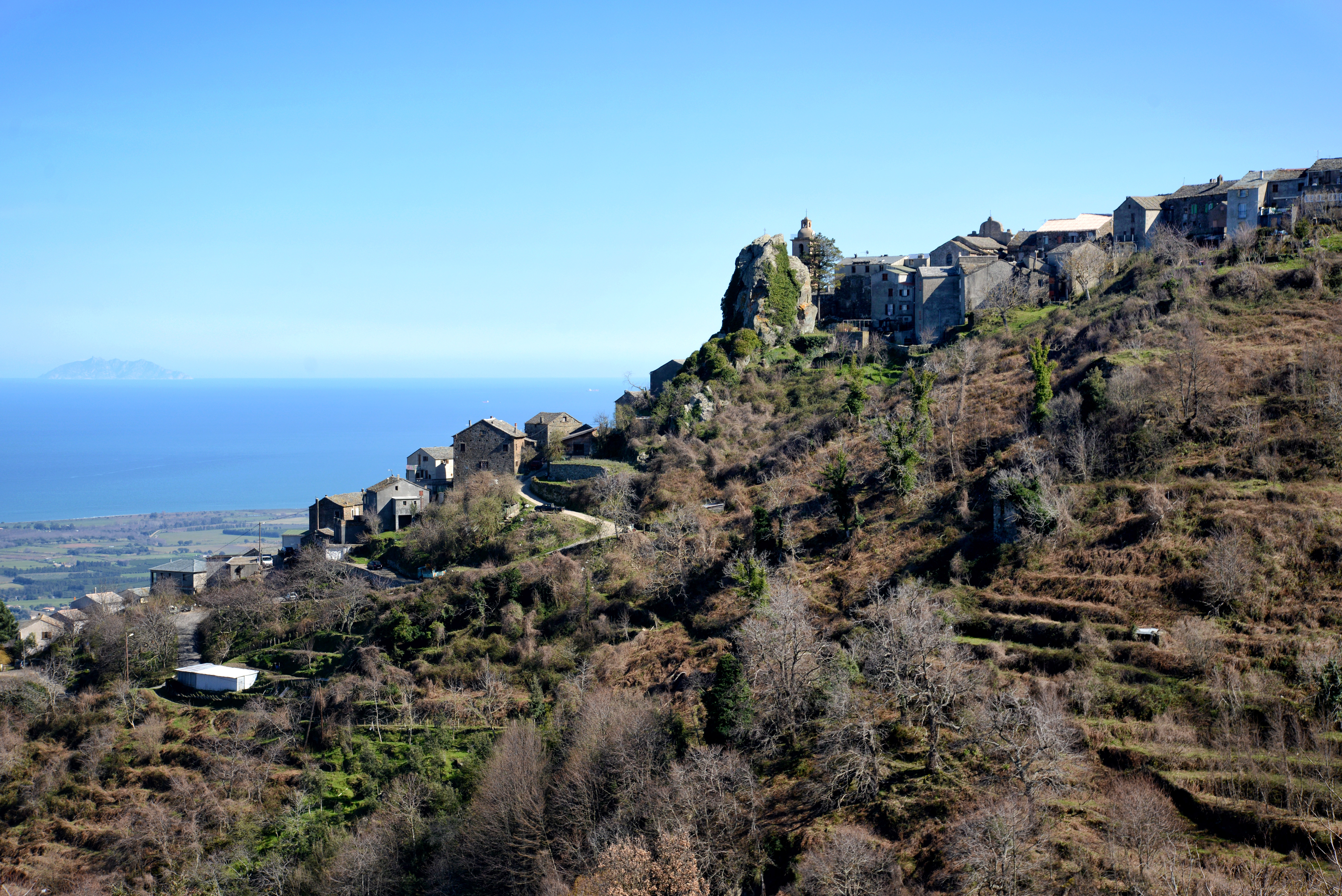
- A general view of Loreto-di-Casinca
- Location of Loreto-di-Casinca
- Location within France Location within Corsica
- Coordinates: 42°28′40″N 9°25′53″E
- Country: France
- Region: Corsica
- Department: Haute-Corse
- Arrondissement: Corte
- Canton: Casinca-Fumalto

Government
  - Mayor (2020–2026): Jean-Charles Angelini
- Area^{1}: 8.1 km^{2} (3.1 sq mi)
- Elevation: 630 m (2,070 ft)
- Highest elevation: 1,218 m (3,996 ft)
- Lowest elevation: 240 m (790 ft)
- Population (2023): 188
  - Density: 23/km^{2} (60/sq mi)
- Time zone: UTC+01:00 (CET)
  - Summer (DST): UTC+02:00 (CEST)
- INSEE/Postal code: 2B145 /20215
- ^{1} French Land Register data, which excludes lakes, ponds, glaciers > 1 km^{2} (0.386 sq mi or 247 acres) and river estuaries.

Loreto-di-Casinca is a commune in the Haute-Corse department of France on the island of Corsica. The Église Saint-André de Loreto-di-Casinca is a historical monument.

== Population ==
Historical population
Year	Pop.	±% p.a.
1968	430	—
1975	255	−7.19%
1982	213	−2.54%
1990	225	+0.69%
1999	234	+0.44%
2007	249	+0.78%
2012	230	−1.57%
2017	212	−1.62%
2023	188	−1.98%
Source: INSEE

== See also ==
- Communes of the Haute-Corse department
