= Poggio-Marinaccio =

Poggio-Marinaccio U Poghju Marinacciu
- Commune
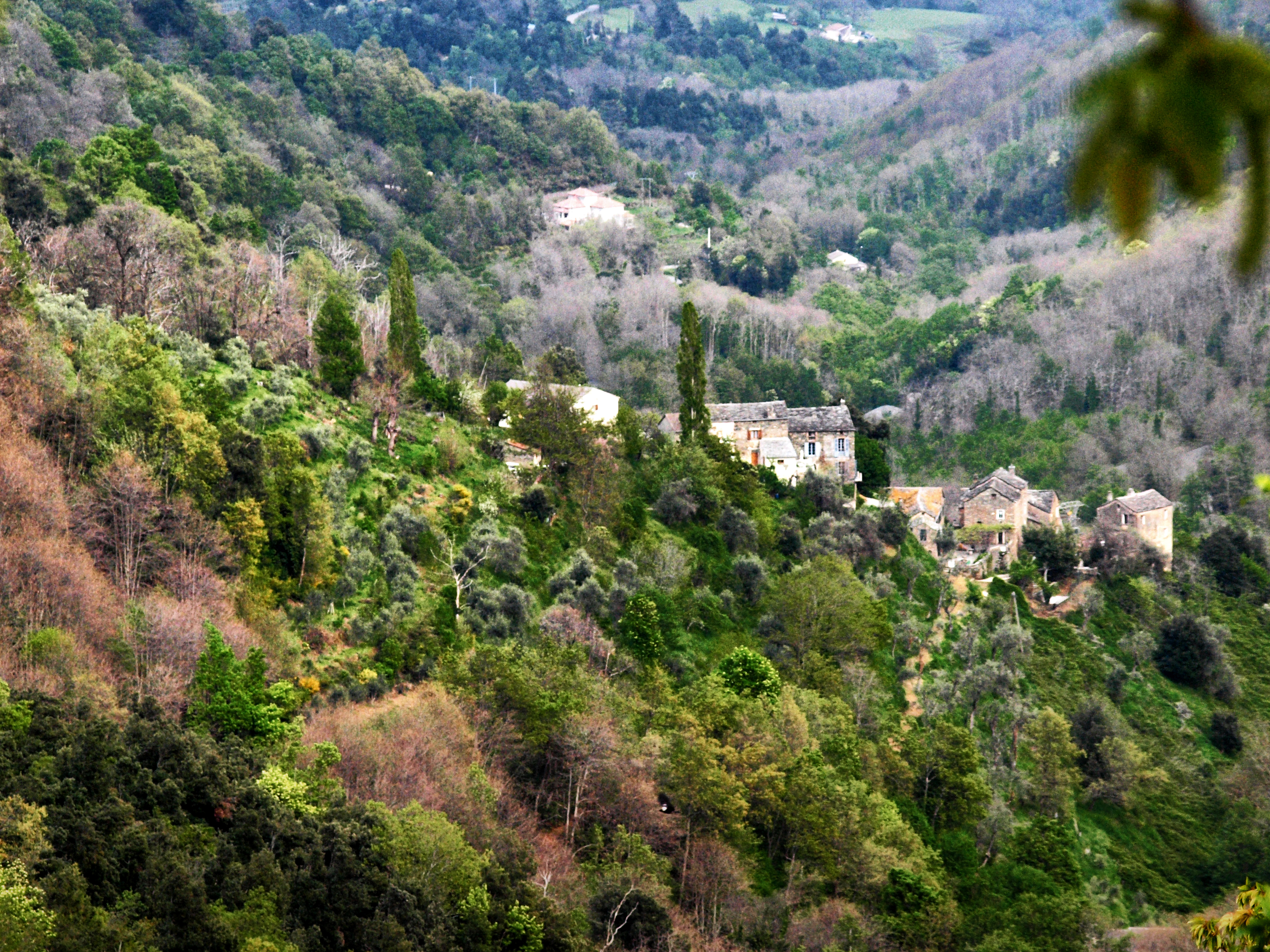
- Poggio-Marinaccio seen from the hillside
- Location of Poggio-Marinaccio
- Location within France Location within Corsica
- Coordinates: 42°26′10″N 9°21′14″E
- Country: France
- Region: Corsica
- Department: Haute-Corse
- Arrondissement: Corte
- Canton: Casinca-Fumalto

Government
  - Mayor (2020–2026): Pierre Orsini
- Area^{1}: 2.83 km^{2} (1.09 sq mi)
- Elevation: 600 m (2,000 ft)
- Highest elevation: 1,231 m (4,039 ft)
- Lowest elevation: 340 m (1,120 ft)
- Population (2023): 38
  - Density: 13/km^{2} (35/sq mi)
- Time zone: UTC+01:00 (CET)
  - Summer (DST): UTC+02:00 (CEST)
- INSEE/Postal code: 2B241 /20237
- ^{1} French Land Register data, which excludes lakes, ponds, glaciers > 1 km^{2} (0.386 sq mi or 247 acres) and river estuaries.

Poggio-Marinaccio is a commune in the Haute-Corse department of France on the island of Corsica.

== Population ==
Historical population
Year	Pop.	±% p.a.
1968	44	—
1975	38	−2.07%
1982	31	−2.87%
1990	22	−4.20%
1999	16	−3.48%
2007	25	+5.74%
2012	30	+3.71%
2017	30	+0.00%
2023	38	+4.02%
Source: INSEE

== See also ==
- Communes of the Haute-Corse department
