= Canton of Casinca-Fumalto =

Administrative division of the Haute-Corse department, southeastern France

Coordinates: 42.46°N 9.46°E

The canton of Casinca-Fumalto is an administrative division of the Haute-Corse department, southeastern France. It was created at the French canton reorganisation which came into effect in March 2015. Its seat is in Penta-di-Casinca.

It consists of the following communes:

1. Casabianca
2. Casalta
3. Castellare-di-Casinca
4. Croce
5. Ficaja
6. Giocatojo
7. Loreto-di-Casinca
8. Penta-di-Casinca
9. Pero-Casevecchie
10. Piano
11. Poggio-Marinaccio
12. Polveroso
13. Porri
14. La Porta
15. Pruno
16. Quercitello
17. San-Damiano
18. San-Gavino-d'Ampugnani
19. Scata
20. Silvareccio
21. Sorbo-Ocagnano
22. Taglio-Isolaccio
23. Talasani
24. Venzolasca
25. Vescovato
