= Polveroso =

Polveroso U Pulverosu
- Commune
- Location of Polveroso
- Location within France Location within Corsica
- Coordinates: 42°24′06″N 9°21′56″E
- Country: France
- Region: Corsica
- Department: Haute-Corse
- Arrondissement: Corte
- Canton: Casinca-Fumalto

Government
  - Mayor (2020–2026): Jean Etienne Frisoni
- Area^{1}: 1.96 km^{2} (0.76 sq mi)
- Elevation: 600 m (2,000 ft)
- Highest elevation: 1,048 m (3,438 ft)
- Lowest elevation: 315 m (1,033 ft)
- Population (2023): 31
  - Density: 16/km^{2} (41/sq mi)
- Time zone: UTC+01:00 (CET)
  - Summer (DST): UTC+02:00 (CEST)
- INSEE/Postal code: 2B243 /20229
- ^{1} French Land Register data, which excludes lakes, ponds, glaciers > 1 km^{2} (0.386 sq mi or 247 acres) and river estuaries.

Polveroso is a commune in the Haute-Corse department of France on the island of Corsica.

== Population ==
Historical population
Year	Pop.	±% p.a.
1968	61	—
1975	38	−6.54%
1982	35	−1.17%
1990	21	−6.19%
1999	22	+0.52%
2007	42	+8.42%
2012	39	−1.47%
2017	42	+1.49%
2023	31	−4.94%
Source: INSEE

== See also ==
- Communes of the Haute-Corse department
