= Castellare-di-Casinca =

- Commune
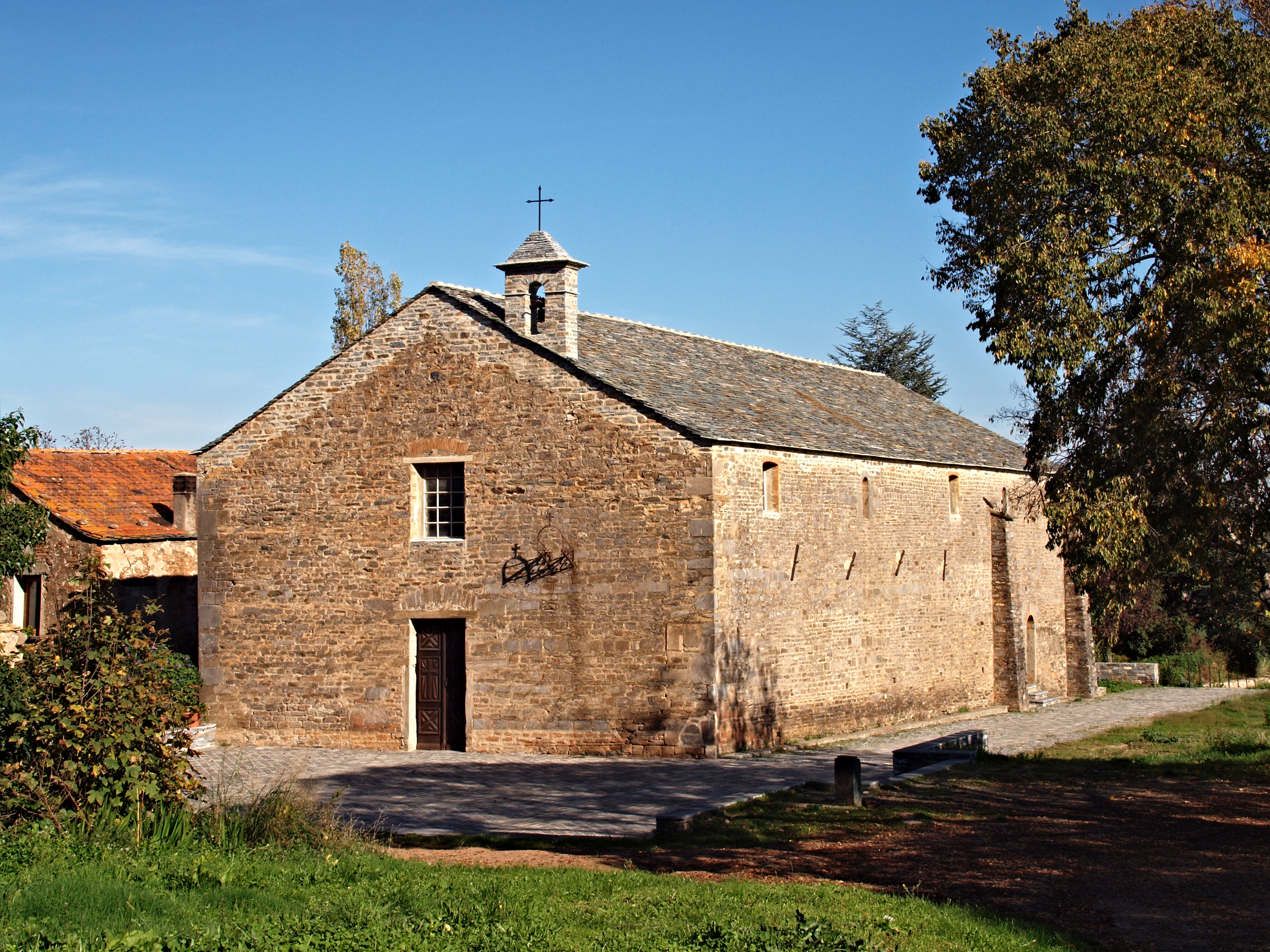
- The church of San Pancraziu, in Castellare-di-Casinca
- Location of Castellare-di-Casinca
- Location within France Location within Corsica
- Coordinates: 42°28′07″N 9°28′27″E
- Country: France
- Region: Corsica
- Department: Haute-Corse
- Arrondissement: Corte
- Canton: Casinca-Fumalto

Government
  - Mayor (2022–2026): Marc Marie Filippi
- Area^{1}: 8.88 km^{2} (3.43 sq mi)
- Elevation: 150 m (490 ft)
- Highest elevation: 320 m (1,050 ft)
- Lowest elevation: 0 m (0 ft)
- Population (2023): 701
  - Density: 78.9/km^{2} (204/sq mi)
- Time zone: UTC+01:00 (CET)
  - Summer (DST): UTC+02:00 (CEST)
- INSEE/Postal code: 2B077 /20213
- ^{1} French Land Register data, which excludes lakes, ponds, glaciers > 1 km^{2} (0.386 sq mi or 247 acres) and river estuaries.

Castellare-di-Casinca (French pronunciation: [kastɛlaʁ di kazɛ̃ka]) is a commune in the Haute-Corse department of France on the island of Corsica.

== Population ==
Historical population
Year	Pop.	±% p.a.
1968	404	—
1975	615	+6.19%
1982	360	−7.36%
1990	389	+0.97%
1999	498	+2.78%
2007	555	+1.36%
2012	605	+1.74%
2017	666	+1.94%
2023	701	+0.86%
Source: INSEE

== See also ==
- Communes of the Haute-Corse department
