= Église Saint-André de Loreto-di-Casinca =

Coordinates: 42°28′38″N 9°25′54″E

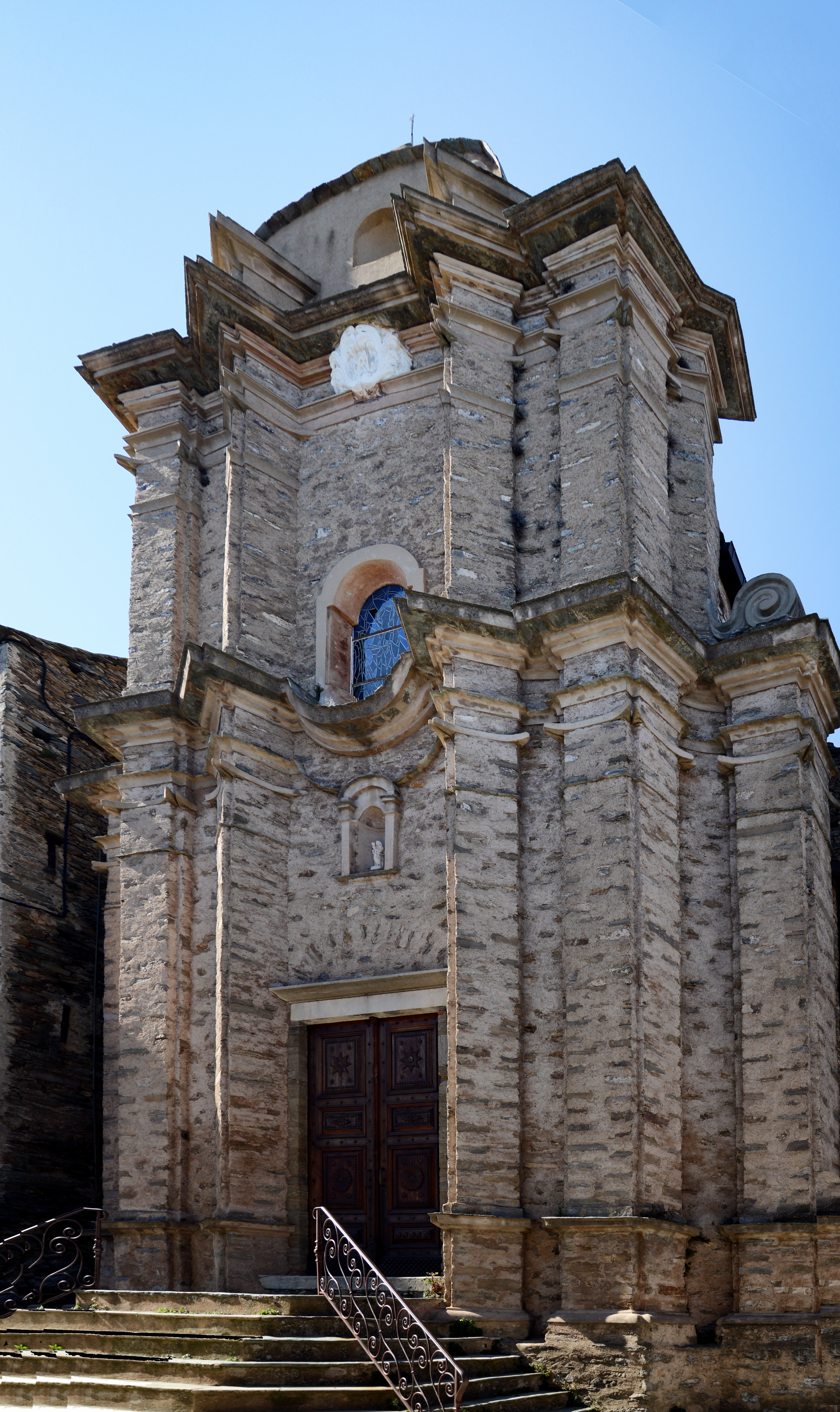
- Front of Saint-André church
- Location: Loreto-di-Casinca, Haute-Corse, Corsica

Église Saint-André de Loreto-di-Casinca is a Catholic baroque church in Loreto-di-Casinca, Haute-Corse, Corsica. The building was classified as a Historic Monument in 1976.
