= Ficaja =

- Commune
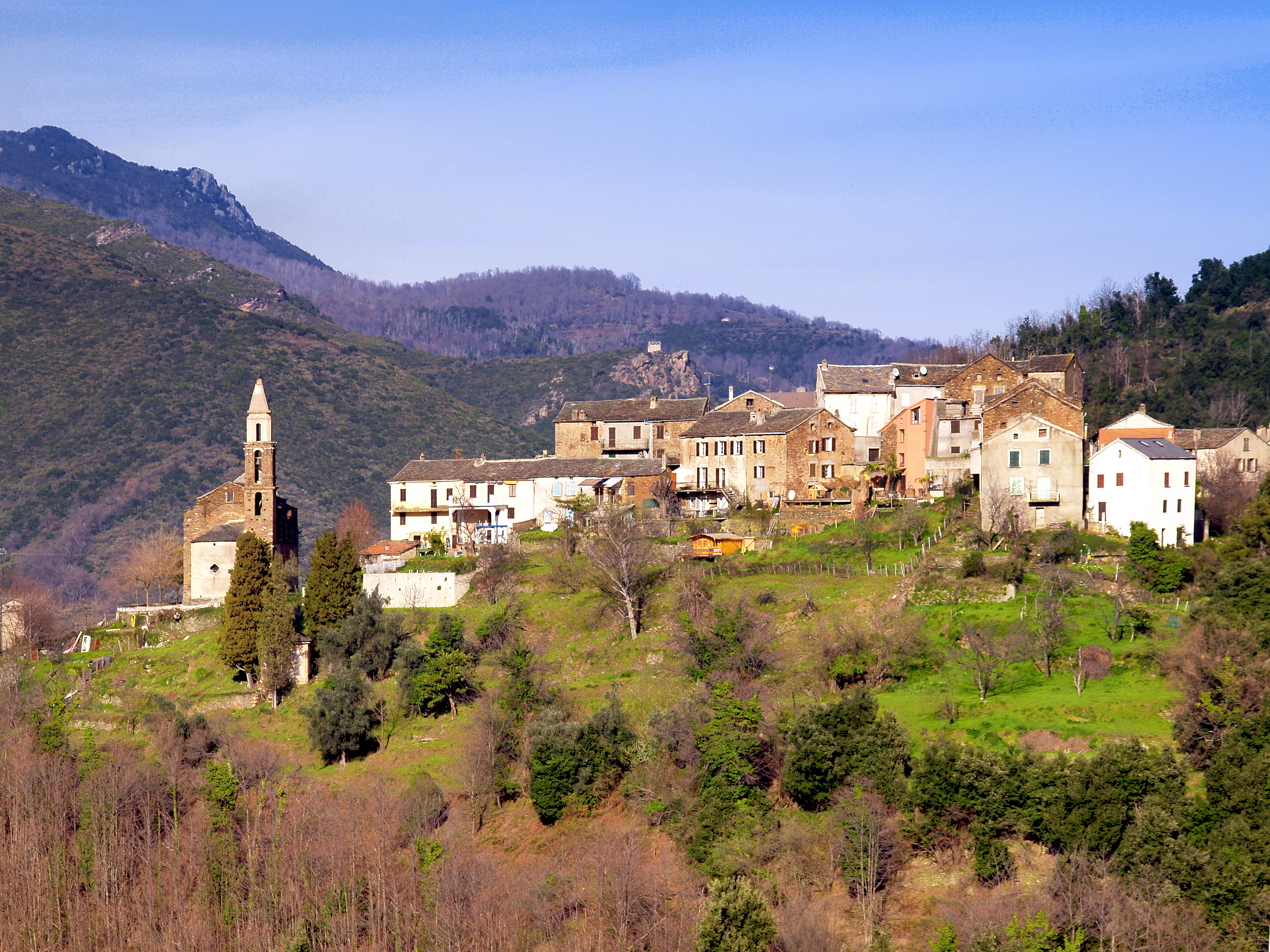
- A general view of Ficaja
- Location of Ficaja
- Location within France Location within Corsica
- Coordinates: 42°25′23″N 9°22′04″E
- Country: France
- Region: Corsica
- Department: Haute-Corse
- Arrondissement: Corte
- Canton: Casinca-Fumalto

Government
  - Mayor (2020–2026): Alexandre Gambotti
- Area^{1}: 5.05 km^{2} (1.95 sq mi)
- Elevation: 570 m (1,870 ft)
- Highest elevation: 725 m (2,379 ft)
- Lowest elevation: 220 m (720 ft)
- Population (2023): 54
  - Density: 11/km^{2} (28/sq mi)
- Time zone: UTC+01:00 (CET)
  - Summer (DST): UTC+02:00 (CEST)
- INSEE/Postal code: 2B113 /20237
- ^{1} French Land Register data, which excludes lakes, ponds, glaciers > 1 km^{2} (0.386 sq mi or 247 acres) and river estuaries.

Ficaja is a commune in the Haute-Corse department of France on the island of Corsica.

== Population ==
Historical population
Year	Pop.	±% p.a.
1968	84	—
1975	54	−6.12%
1982	48	−1.67%
1990	48	+0.00%
1999	34	−3.76%
2007	49	+4.67%
2012	52	+1.20%
2017	53	+0.38%
2023	54	+0.31%
Source: INSEE

== See also ==
- Communes of the Haute-Corse department
