= Venzolasca =

- Commune
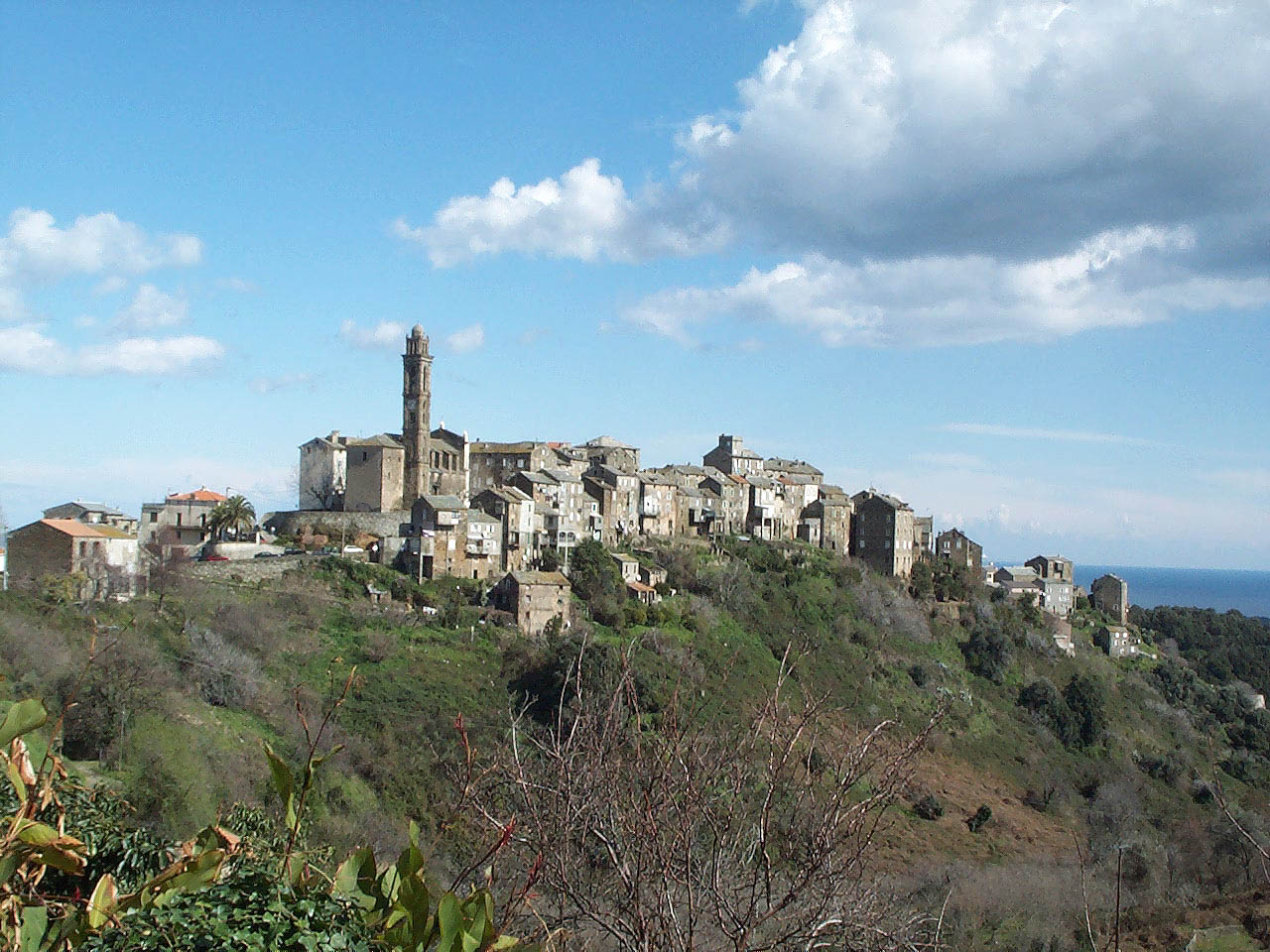
- A general view of the village of Venzolasca
- Location of Venzolasca
- Location within France Location within Corsica
- Coordinates: 42°29′06″N 9°27′26″E
- Country: France
- Region: Corsica
- Department: Haute-Corse
- Arrondissement: Corte
- Canton: Casinca-Fumalto

Government
  - Mayor (2020–2026): Balthazar Federici
- Area^{1}: 16.15 km^{2} (6.24 sq mi)
- Elevation: 350 m (1,150 ft)
- Highest elevation: 310 m (1,020 ft)
- Lowest elevation: 0 m (0 ft)
- Population (2023): 1,874
  - Density: 116.0/km^{2} (300.5/sq mi)
- Time zone: UTC+01:00 (CET)
  - Summer (DST): UTC+02:00 (CEST)
- INSEE/Postal code: 2B343 /20215
- ^{1} French Land Register data, which excludes lakes, ponds, glaciers > 1 km^{2} (0.386 sq mi or 247 acres) and river estuaries.

Venzolasca (French pronunciation: [vɛnzɔlaska]; Corsican: A Venzulà) is a commune in the Haute-Corse department of France on the island of Corsica.

== Population ==
Historical population
Year	Pop.	±% p.a.
1968	863	—
1975	924	+0.98%
1982	1,032	+1.59%
1990	1,162	+1.49%
1999	1,333	+1.54%
2007	1,688	+3.00%
2012	1,657	−0.37%
2017	1,796	+1.62%
2023	1,874	+0.71%
Source: INSEE

== See also ==
- Communes of the Haute-Corse department
