= Talasani =

- Commune
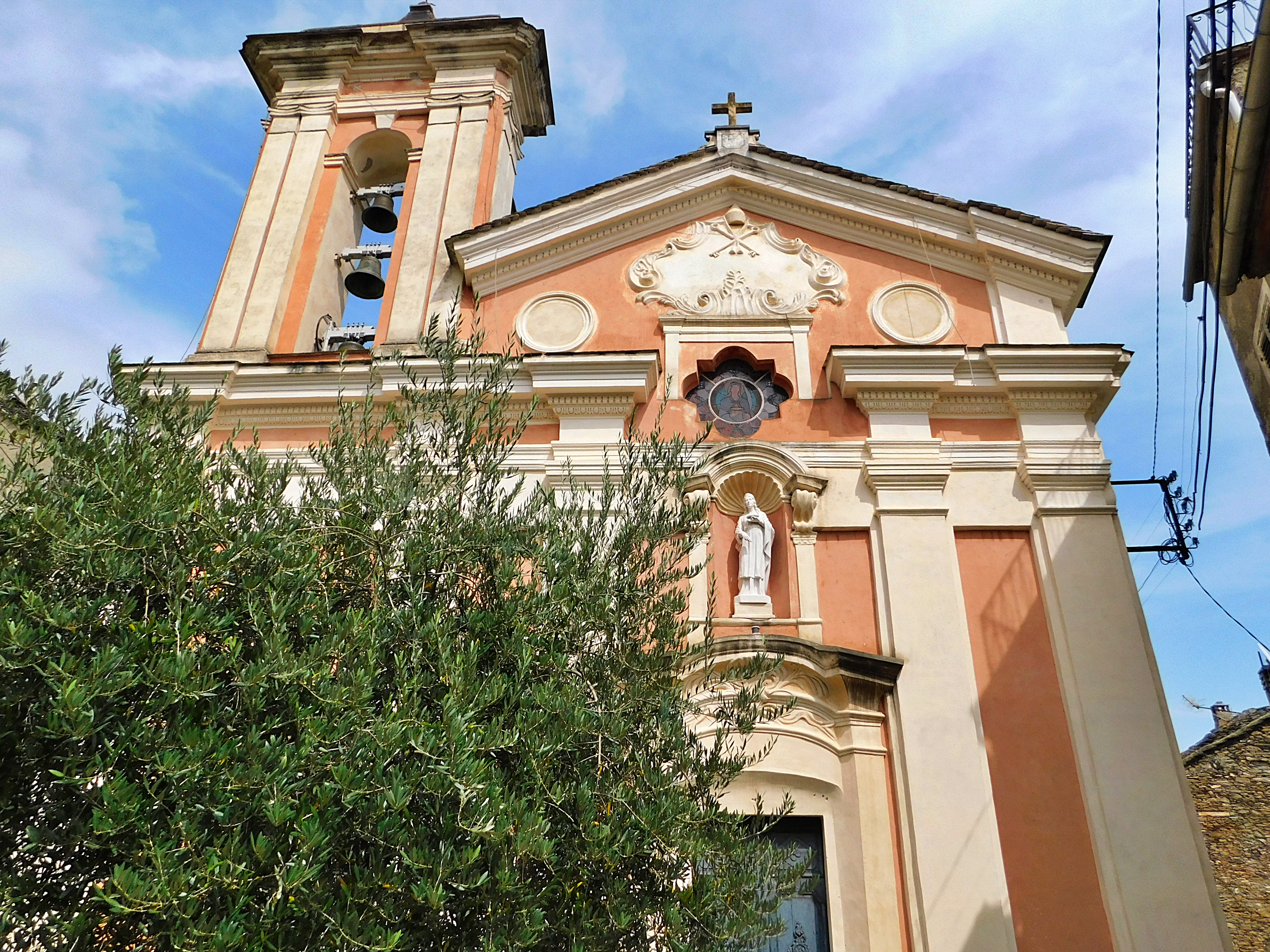
- Saint Lucy Church in Talasani
- Location of Talasani
- Location within France Location within Corsica
- Coordinates: 42°24′32″N 9°28′50″E
- Country: France
- Region: Corsica
- Department: Haute-Corse
- Arrondissement: Corte
- Canton: Casinca-Fumalto
- Intercommunality: Costa Verde

Government
  - Mayor (2020–2026): Francis Marcantei
- Area^{1}: 10.09 km^{2} (3.90 sq mi)
- Elevation: 392 m (1,286 ft)
- Highest elevation: 487 m (1,598 ft)
- Lowest elevation: 0 m (0 ft)
- Population (2023): 847
  - Density: 83.9/km^{2} (217/sq mi)
- Time zone: UTC+01:00 (CET)
  - Summer (DST): UTC+02:00 (CEST)
- INSEE/Postal code: 2B319 /20230
- ^{1} French Land Register data, which excludes lakes, ponds, glaciers > 1 km^{2} (0.386 sq mi or 247 acres) and river estuaries.

Talasani (French pronunciation: [talazani]) is a rural commune and village on the eastern seaboard of Corsica, in the Haute-Corse department of France. The area has a very low population density and mainly comprises forests and farmland. As a coastal municipality, Talasani enforces strict urban planning provisions in order to preserve the ecological balance of the coast.

== Geography ==
Talasani is a village on the eastern coast of Corsica, part of the canton of Casinca-Fumalto. It was once part of the piève, or religious district, of Tavagna. Today, Talasani belongs to the Communauté de Communes de la Costa Verde, a microregion north of the Plaine orientale.

== Town planning ==
=== Typology ===
Due to its low population density, Talasani is designated as a rural commune according to the municipal density grid of Insee. (Note: According to the zoning of rural and urban municipalities published in November 2020, in application of the new definition of rurality validated on 14 November 2020 by the interministerial committee of ruralities.) It belongs to the urban unit of Penta-di-Casinca, an agglomeration comprising 7 communes and 9,501 inhabitants as of 2017.

The commune is within the metropolitan area (Note: In October 2020, the notion of city catchment area replaced the old notion of urban area, to allow consistent comparisons with other European Union countries.) of Bastia, which includes 93 communes and belongs to the category of urban areas with between 50,000 and 200,000 inhabitants.

The municipality bordered by the Mediterranean Sea is also a coastal municipality within the meaning of the law of 3 January 1986, known as the coastal law. Specific urban planning provisions therefore apply in order to preserve natural spaces, sites, landscapes and the ecological balance of the coast. For example, this limits building outside already urbanized spaces within 100 metres (330 ft) of the coastline, or more if specified by local zoning.

=== Land use ===
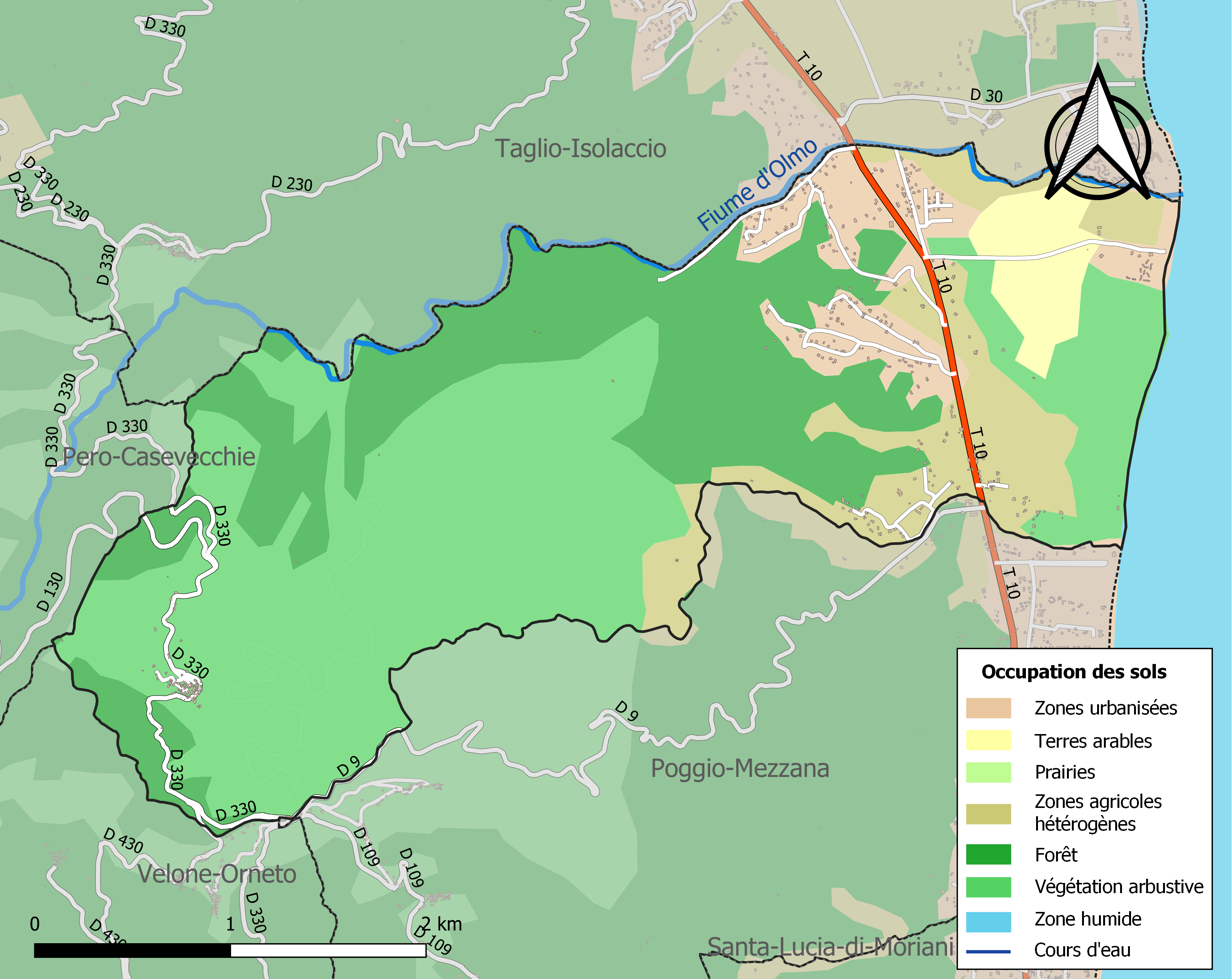
Map of land use in Talasani, 2018.

According to the European database of biophysical land use, Corine Land Cover (CLC), Talasani's land use consists mostly of forests and semi-natural environments (75.5% in 2018). This proportion has changed very little since 1990 (75.4%). The detailed breakdown in 2018 is as follows: shrub and/or herbaceous vegetation (46.6%), forests (28.9%), heterogeneous agricultural areas (12.2%), urbanized areas (8.3%), permanent crops (3.9%), artificial green spaces, non-agricultural (0.1%), maritime waters (0.1%).

IGN also provides an online tool to compare the evolution over time of land use in the municipality (or in territories at different scales). Maps or aerial photos are available depicting multiple eras: the Cassini map (eighteenth century), the staff map (1820-1866), and the current period (1950 to today).

== Population ==
Historical population

Year	Pop.	±% p.a.
1800	422	—
1821	453	+0.34%
1846	541	+0.71%
1872	460	−0.62%
1901	529	+0.48%
1926	402	−1.09%
1946	271	−1.95%
1962	263	−0.19%
1968	236	−1.79%

Year	Pop.	±% p.a.
1975	226	−0.62%
1982	218	−0.51%
1990	394	+7.68%
1999	516	+3.04%
2007	557	+0.96%
2012	731	+5.59%
2017	772	+1.10%
2023	847	+1.56%

Source: EHESS and INSEE (1968-2023)

== See also ==
- Communes of the Haute-Corse department
