= Croce, Haute-Corse =

Croce
- Commune
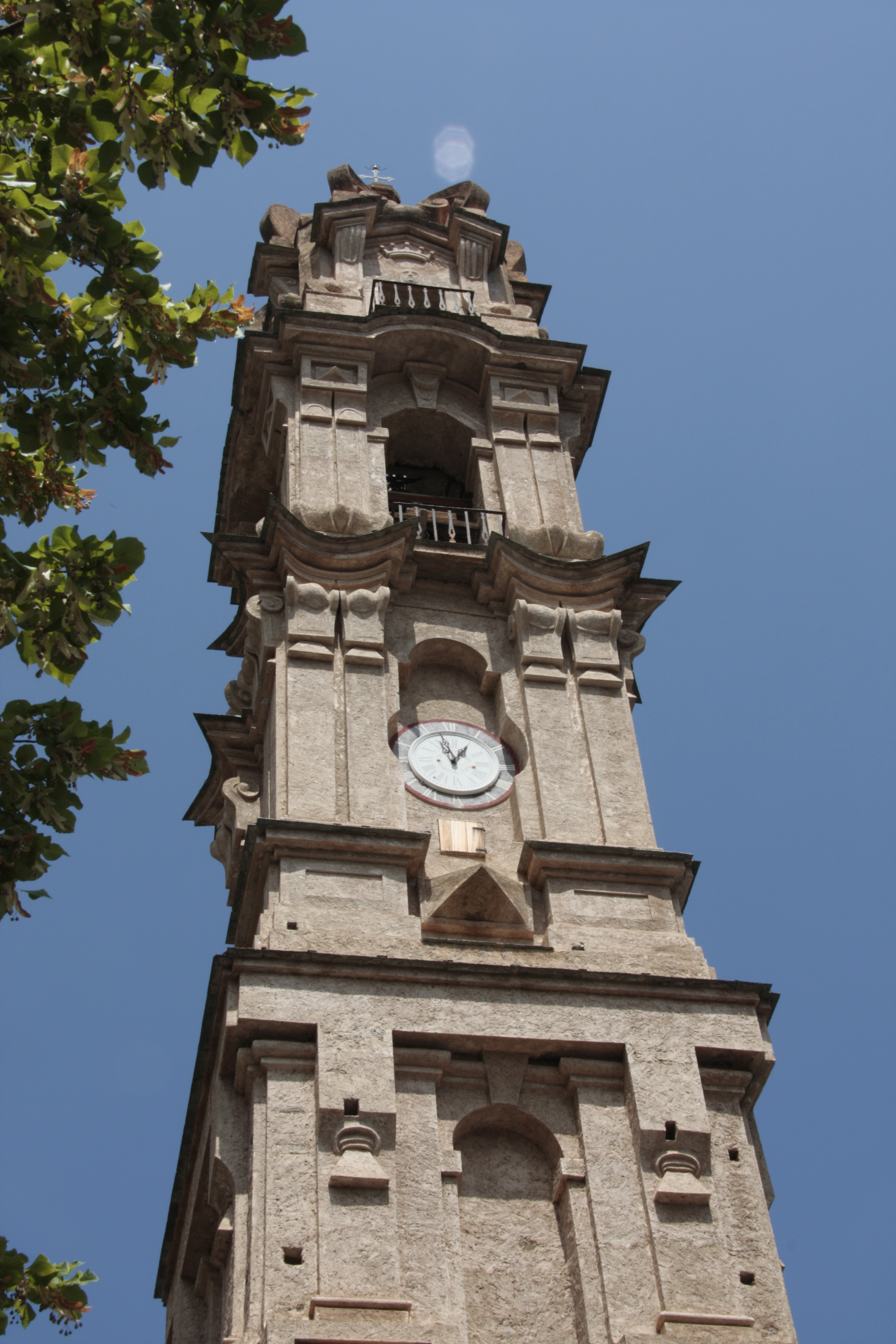
- Bell tower
- Location of Croce
- Location within France Location within Corsica
- Coordinates: 42°24′51″N 9°21′43″E
- Country: France
- Region: Corsica
- Department: Haute-Corse
- Arrondissement: Corte
- Canton: Casinca-Fumalto

Government
  - Mayor (2020–2026): Jean-François Mattei
- Area^{1}: 6.43 km^{2} (2.48 sq mi)
- Elevation: 800 m (2,600 ft)
- Highest elevation: 1,655 m (5,430 ft)
- Lowest elevation: 259 m (850 ft)
- Population (2023): 78
  - Density: 12/km^{2} (31/sq mi)
- Time zone: UTC+01:00 (CET)
  - Summer (DST): UTC+02:00 (CEST)
- INSEE/Postal code: 2B101 /20140
- ^{1} French Land Register data, which excludes lakes, ponds, glaciers > 1 km^{2} (0.386 sq mi or 247 acres) and river estuaries.

Croce is a commune in the Haute-Corse department of France on the island of Corsica.

== Population ==
Historical population
Year	Pop.	±% p.a.
1968	106	—
1975	97	−1.26%
1982	100	+0.44%
1990	78	−3.06%
1999	85	+0.96%
2007	82	−0.45%
2012	77	−1.25%
2017	75	−0.52%
2023	78	+0.66%
Source: INSEE

== See also ==
- Communes of the Haute-Corse department
