= Scata =

- Commune
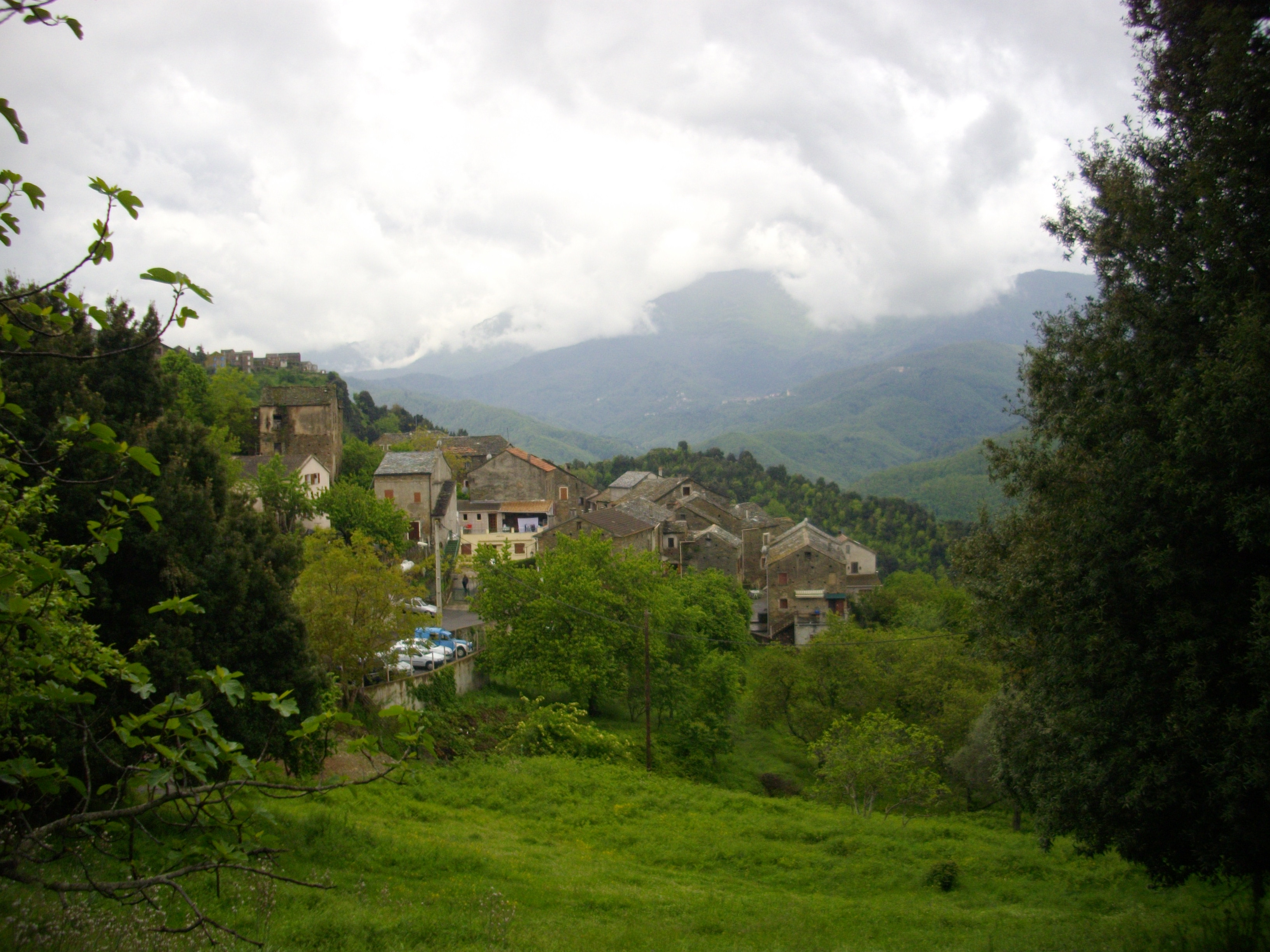
- A general view of the village of Scata
- Location of Scata
- Location within France Location within Corsica
- Coordinates: 42°25′02″N 9°24′07″E
- Country: France
- Region: Corsica
- Department: Haute-Corse
- Arrondissement: Corte
- Canton: Casinca-Fumalto

Government
  - Mayor (2020–2026): Joseph Pastini
- Area^{1}: 2.8 km^{2} (1.1 sq mi)
- Elevation: 250 m (820 ft)
- Highest elevation: 640 m (2,100 ft)
- Lowest elevation: 160 m (520 ft)
- Population (2023): 41
  - Density: 15/km^{2} (38/sq mi)
- Time zone: UTC+01:00 (CET)
  - Summer (DST): UTC+02:00 (CEST)
- INSEE/Postal code: 2B273 /20213
- ^{1} French Land Register data, which excludes lakes, ponds, glaciers > 1 km^{2} (0.386 sq mi or 247 acres) and river estuaries.

Scata (French pronunciation: [skata]) is a commune in the Haute-Corse department of France on the island of Corsica.

== Population ==
Historical population
Year	Pop.	±% p.a.
1968	116	—
1975	59	−9.21%
1982	45	−3.80%
1990	32	−4.17%
1999	44	+3.60%
2007	44	+0.00%
2012	49	+2.18%
2017	46	−1.26%
2023	41	−1.90%
Source: INSEE

== See also ==
- Communes of the Haute-Corse department
