= Carcheto-Brustico =

- Commune
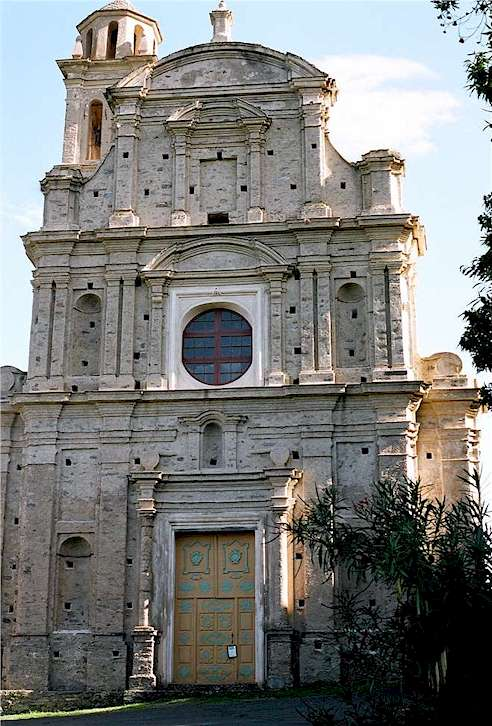
- The church in Carcheto-Brustico
- Location of Carcheto-Brustico
- Location within France Location within Corsica
- Coordinates: 42°21′57″N 9°22′00″E
- Country: France
- Region: Corsica
- Department: Haute-Corse
- Arrondissement: Corte
- Canton: Castagniccia

Government
  - Mayor (2020–2026): Emilie Albertini
- Area^{1}: 5.19 km^{2} (2.00 sq mi)
- Elevation: 630 m (2,070 ft)
- Highest elevation: 1,697 m (5,568 ft)
- Lowest elevation: 436 m (1,430 ft)
- Population (2023): 57
  - Density: 11/km^{2} (28/sq mi)
- Time zone: UTC+01:00 (CET)
  - Summer (DST): UTC+02:00 (CEST)
- INSEE/Postal code: 2B063 /20229
- ^{1} French Land Register data, which excludes lakes, ponds, glaciers > 1 km^{2} (0.386 sq mi or 247 acres) and river estuaries.

Carcheto-Brustico (French pronunciation: [kaʁketo bʁustiko]; Corsican: Carchetu è Brusticu) is a commune in the Haute-Corse department of France on the island of Corsica.

== Population ==
Historical population
Year	Pop.	±% p.a.
1968	47	—
1975	44	−0.94%
1982	39	−1.71%
1990	19	−8.60%
1999	18	−0.60%
2007	24	+3.66%
2012	28	+3.13%
2017	31	+2.06%
2023	57	+10.68%
Source: INSEE

== Monuments ==
- Église Sainte-Marguerite de Carcheto-Brustico

== See also ==
- Communes of the Haute-Corse department
