= Piano, Haute-Corse =

Piano U Pianu
- Commune
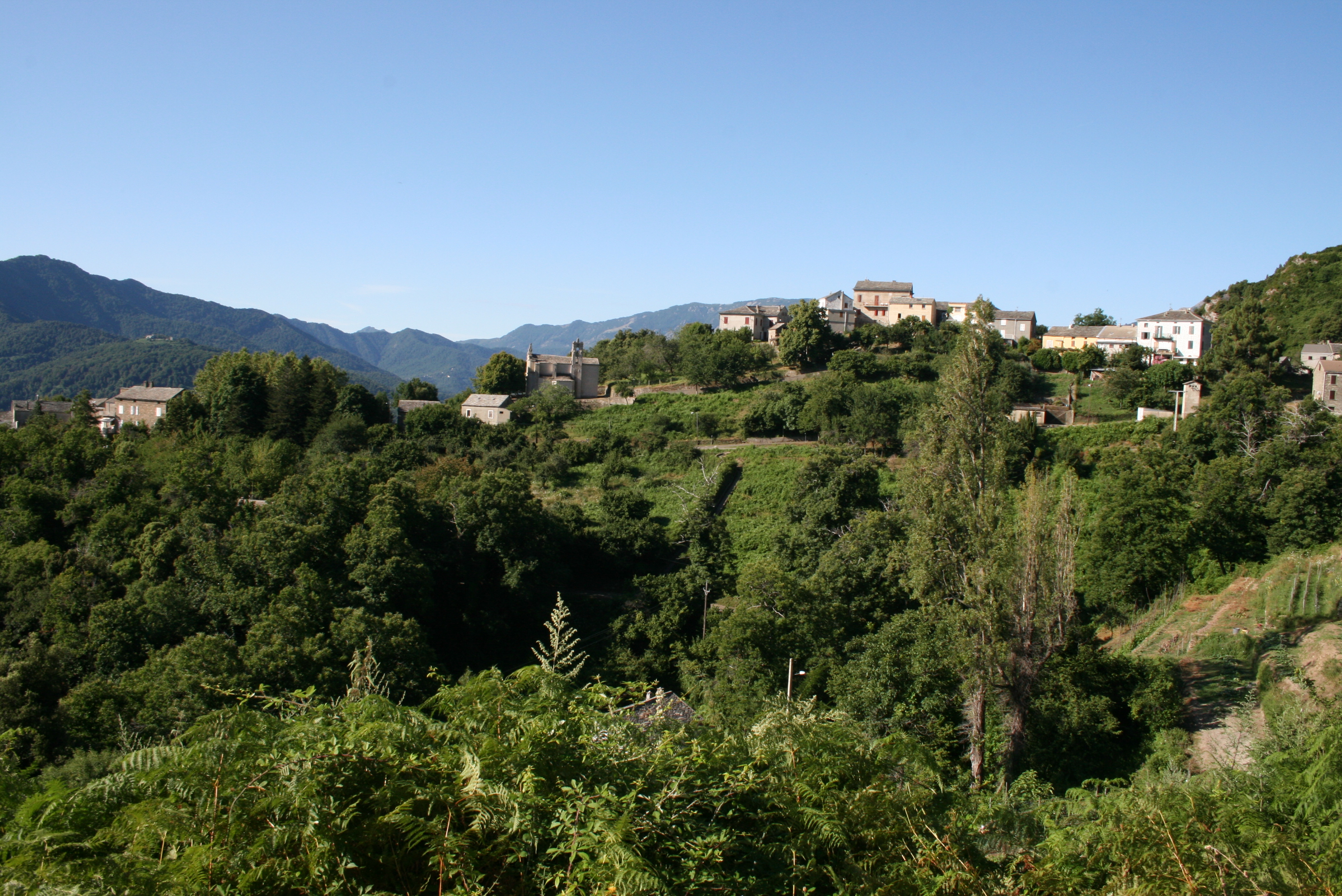
- The village of Piano
- Location of Piano
- Location within France Location within Corsica
- Coordinates: 42°26′53″N 9°24′14″E
- Country: France
- Region: Corsica
- Department: Haute-Corse
- Arrondissement: Corte
- Canton: Casinca-Fumalto

Government
  - Mayor (2020–2026): Jean Sauveur Vallesi
- Area^{1}: 3.41 km^{2} (1.32 sq mi)
- Elevation: 680 m (2,230 ft)
- Highest elevation: 1,016 m (3,333 ft)
- Lowest elevation: 192 m (630 ft)
- Population (2023): 17
  - Density: 5.0/km^{2} (13/sq mi)
- Time zone: UTC+01:00 (CET)
  - Summer (DST): UTC+02:00 (CEST)
- INSEE/Postal code: 2B214 /20131
- ^{1} French Land Register data, which excludes lakes, ponds, glaciers > 1 km^{2} (0.386 sq mi or 247 acres) and river estuaries.

Piano (French pronunciation: [pjano]; Corsican: U Pianu) is a commune in the Haute-Corse department of France on the island of Corsica.

== Population ==
Historical population
Year	Pop.	±% p.a.
1968	64	—
1975	54	−2.40%
1982	75	+4.80%
1990	54	−4.02%
1999	36	−4.41%
2007	36	+0.00%
2012	23	−8.57%
2017	28	+4.01%
2023	17	−7.98%
Source: INSEE

== See also ==
- Communes of the Haute-Corse department
