= San-Gavino-d'Ampugnani =

San-Gavino-d'Ampugnani San Gavinu
- Commune
- Location of San-Gavino-d'Ampugnani
- Location within France Location within Corsica
- Coordinates: 42°24′47″N 9°25′24″E
- Country: France
- Region: Corsica
- Department: Haute-Corse
- Arrondissement: Corte
- Canton: Casinca-Fumalto

Government
  - Mayor (2020–2026): Félix Tambini
- Area^{1}: 3.22 km^{2} (1.24 sq mi)
- Elevation: 400 m (1,300 ft)
- Highest elevation: 600 m (2,000 ft)
- Lowest elevation: 138 m (453 ft)
- Population (2023): 103
  - Density: 32.0/km^{2} (82.8/sq mi)
- Time zone: UTC+01:00 (CET)
  - Summer (DST): UTC+02:00 (CEST)
- INSEE/Postal code: 2B299 /20213
- ^{1} French Land Register data, which excludes lakes, ponds, glaciers > 1 km^{2} (0.386 sq mi or 247 acres) and river estuaries.

San-Gavino-d'Ampugnani is a commune in the Haute-Corse department of France on the island of Corsica.

== Population ==
Historical population
Year	Pop.	±% p.a.
1968	104	—
1975	94	−1.43%
1982	111	+2.40%
1990	56	−8.20%
1999	79	+3.90%
2007	94	+2.20%
2012	89	−1.09%
2017	107	+3.75%
2023	103	−0.63%
Source: INSEE

== See also ==
- Communes of the Haute-Corse department
