= San-Damiano, Haute-Corse =

San-Damiano
- Commune
- Location of San-Damiano
- Location within France Location within Corsica
- Coordinates: 42°24′45″N 9°24′48″E
- Country: France
- Region: Corsica
- Department: Haute-Corse
- Arrondissement: Corte
- Canton: Casinca-Fumalto

Government
  - Mayor (2020–2026): Étienne Giudicelli
- Area^{1}: 5.72 km^{2} (2.21 sq mi)
- Elevation: 700 m (2,300 ft)
- Highest elevation: 1,185 m (3,888 ft)
- Lowest elevation: 242 m (794 ft)
- Population (2023): 54
  - Density: 9.4/km^{2} (24/sq mi)
- Time zone: UTC+01:00 (CET)
  - Summer (DST): UTC+02:00 (CEST)
- INSEE/Postal code: 2B297 /20213
- ^{1} French Land Register data, which excludes lakes, ponds, glaciers > 1 km^{2} (0.386 sq mi or 247 acres) and river estuaries.

San-Damiano (French form) or San Damiano (Corsican: San Damianu) is a commune in the French department of Haute-Corse on the island of Corsica, France.

== Population ==
Historical population
Year	Pop.	±% p.a.
1968	71	—
1975	65	−1.25%
1982	58	−1.61%
1990	34	−6.46%
1999	38	+1.24%
2007	47	+2.69%
2012	52	+2.04%
2017	58	+2.21%
2023	54	−1.18%
Source: INSEE

== See also ==
- Communes of the Haute-Corse department
