= Porri =

- Commune
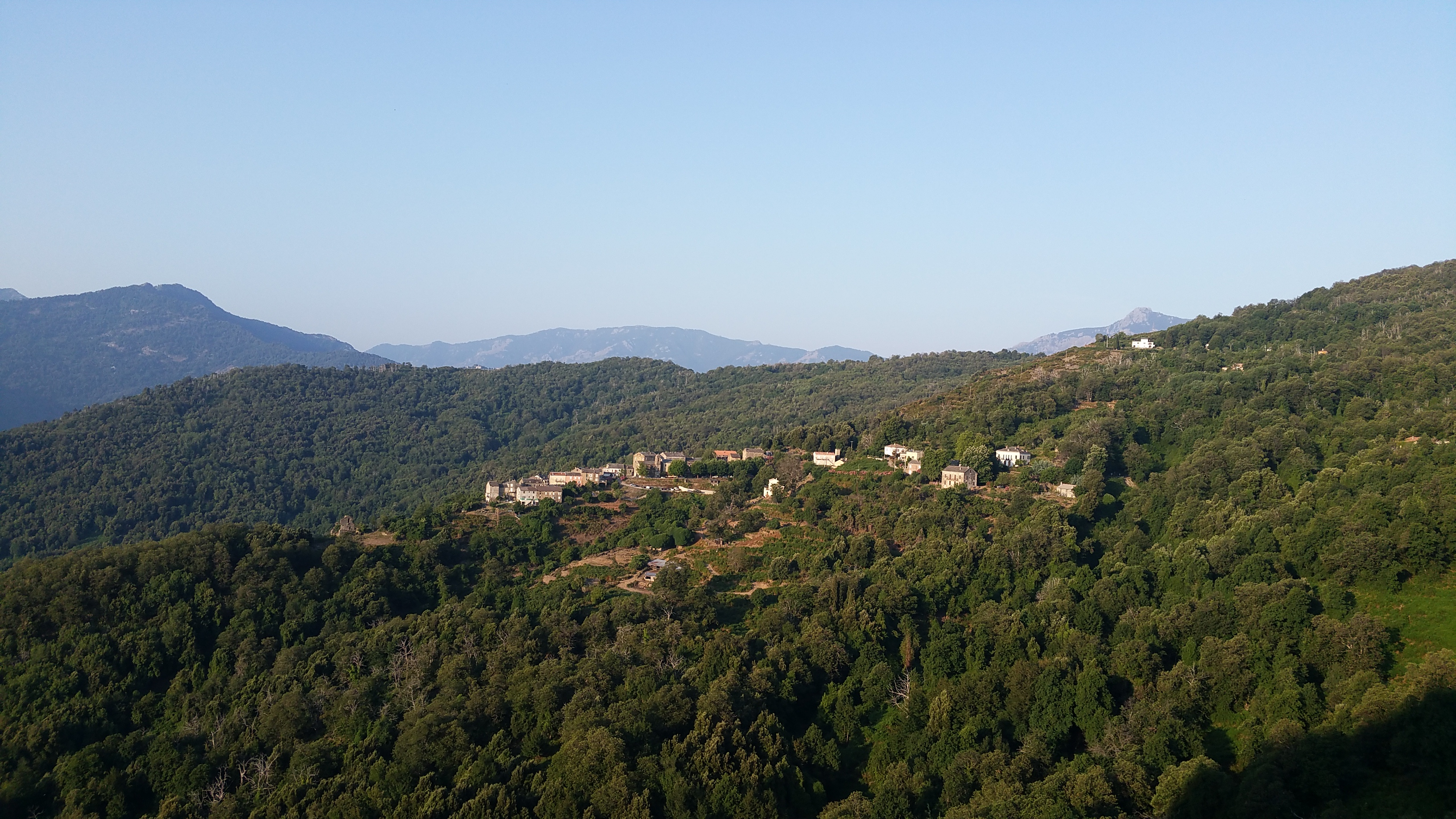
- Distant view of Porri
- Location of Porri
- Location within France Location within Corsica
- Coordinates: 42°27′12″N 9°26′03″E
- Country: France
- Region: Corsica
- Department: Haute-Corse
- Arrondissement: Corte
- Canton: Casinca-Fumalto

Government
  - Mayor (2020–2026): Antoine Francois Rodolphi
- Area^{1}: 4.5 km^{2} (1.7 sq mi)
- Elevation: 500 m (1,600 ft)
- Highest elevation: 657 m (2,156 ft)
- Lowest elevation: 68 m (223 ft)
- Population (2023): 44
  - Density: 9.8/km^{2} (25/sq mi)
- Time zone: UTC+01:00 (CET)
  - Summer (DST): UTC+02:00 (CEST)
- INSEE/Postal code: 2B245 /20215
- ^{1} French Land Register data, which excludes lakes, ponds, glaciers > 1 km^{2} (0.386 sq mi or 247 acres) and river estuaries.

Porri (French pronunciation: [pɔʁi]) is a commune in the Haute-Corse department of France on the island of Corsica.

== Population ==
Historical population
| Year | Pop. | ±% p.a. |
|---|---|---|
| 1968 | 84 | — |
| 1975 | 74 | −1.79% |
| 1982 | 36 | −9.78% |
| 1990 | 34 | −0.71% |
| 1999 | 47 | +3.66% |
| 2007 | 57 | +2.44% |
| 2012 | 57 | +0.00% |
| 2017 | 43 | −5.48% |
| 2023 | 44 | +0.38% |
Source: INSEE

== See also ==
- Communes of the Haute-Corse department
