= Casalta =

- Commune
- Location of Casalta
- Location within France Location within Corsica
- Coordinates: 42°26′34″N 9°24′38″E
- Country: France
- Region: Corsica
- Department: Haute-Corse
- Arrondissement: Corte
- Canton: Casinca-Fumalto

Government
  - Mayor (2020–2026): Paul Jean Innocenzi
- Area^{1}: 4.91 km^{2} (1.90 sq mi)
- Elevation: 400 m (1,300 ft)
- Highest elevation: 600 m (2,000 ft)
- Lowest elevation: 111 m (364 ft)
- Population (2023): 51
  - Density: 10/km^{2} (27/sq mi)
- Time zone: UTC+01:00 (CET)
  - Summer (DST): UTC+02:00 (CEST)
- INSEE/Postal code: 2B072 /20215
- ^{1} French Land Register data, which excludes lakes, ponds, glaciers > 1 km^{2} (0.386 sq mi or 247 acres) and river estuaries.

Casalta (French pronunciation: [kazalta]; Corsican: A Casalta) is a commune in the Haute-Corse department of France on the island of Corsica.

== Population ==
Historical population
Year	Pop.	±% p.a.
1968	70	—
1975	40	−7.68%
1982	35	−1.89%
1990	24	−4.61%
1999	37	+4.93%
2007	53	+4.59%
2012	50	−1.16%
2017	53	+1.17%
2023	51	−0.64%
Source: INSEE

== See also ==
- Communes of the Haute-Corse department
