= Pruno, Haute-Corse =

Pruno U Prunu
- Commune
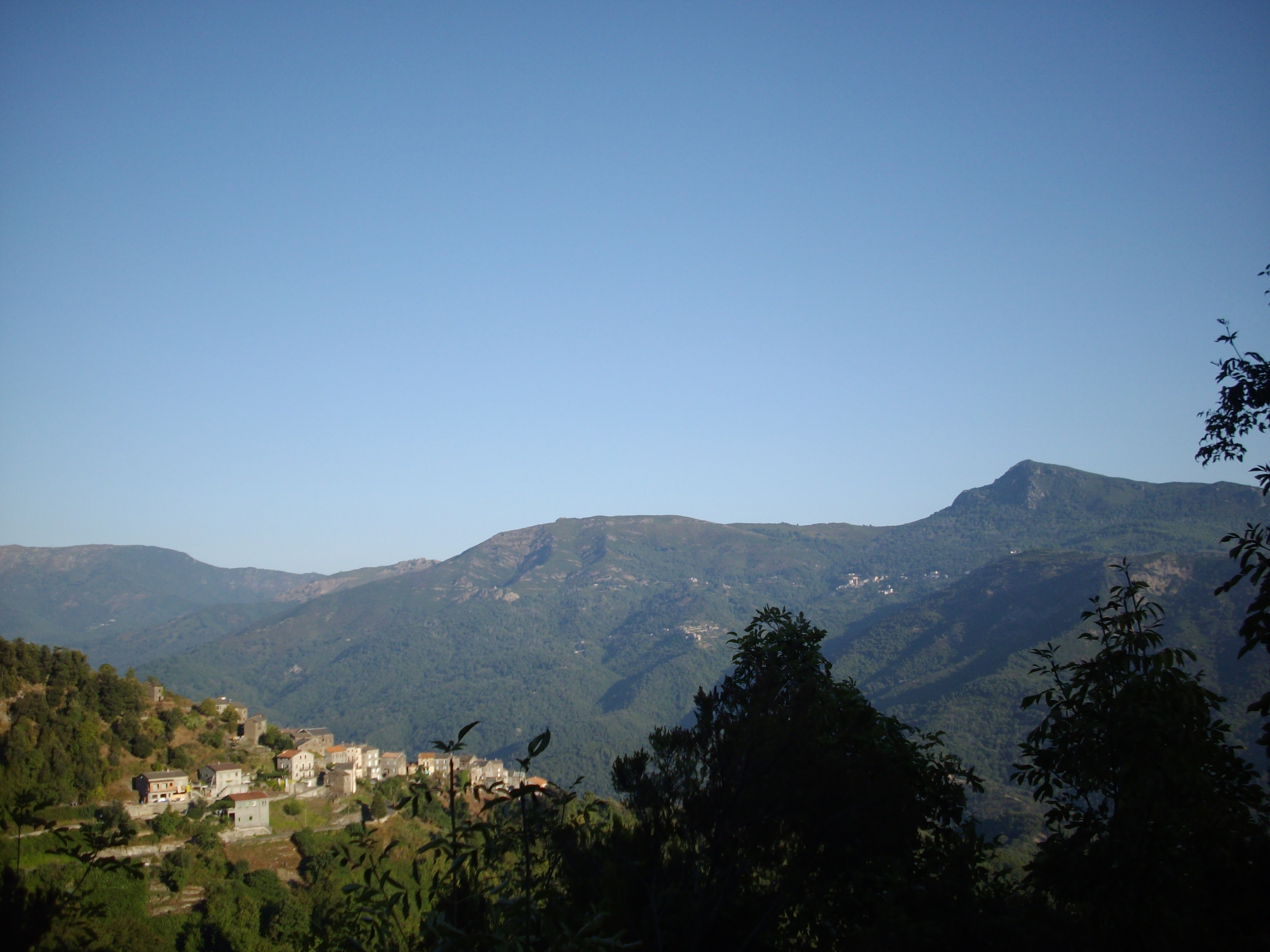
- Pruno and the Monte Sant'Angelo
- Location of Pruno
- Location within France Location within Corsica
- Coordinates: 42°25′01″N 9°26′25″E
- Country: France
- Region: Corsica
- Department: Haute-Corse
- Arrondissement: Corte
- Canton: Casinca-Fumalto

Government
  - Mayor (2020–2026): Charles Felix Giacomi
- Area^{1}: 6.44 km^{2} (2.49 sq mi)
- Elevation: 429 m (1,407 ft)
- Highest elevation: 973 m (3,192 ft)
- Lowest elevation: 64 m (210 ft)
- Population (2023): 180
  - Density: 28/km^{2} (72/sq mi)
- Time zone: UTC+01:00 (CET)
  - Summer (DST): UTC+02:00 (CEST)
- INSEE/Postal code: 2B252 /20264
- ^{1} French Land Register data, which excludes lakes, ponds, glaciers > 1 km^{2} (0.386 sq mi or 247 acres) and river estuaries.

Pruno is a commune in the Haute-Corse department of France on the island of Corsica.

== Population ==
Historical population
Year	Pop.	±% p.a.
1968	245	—
1975	157	−6.16%
1982	145	−1.13%
1990	129	−1.45%
1999	182	+3.90%
2007	194	+0.80%
2012	183	−1.16%
2017	175	−0.89%
2023	180	+0.47%
Source: INSEE

== See also ==
- Communes of the Haute-Corse department
