= Penta-di-Casinca =

- Commune
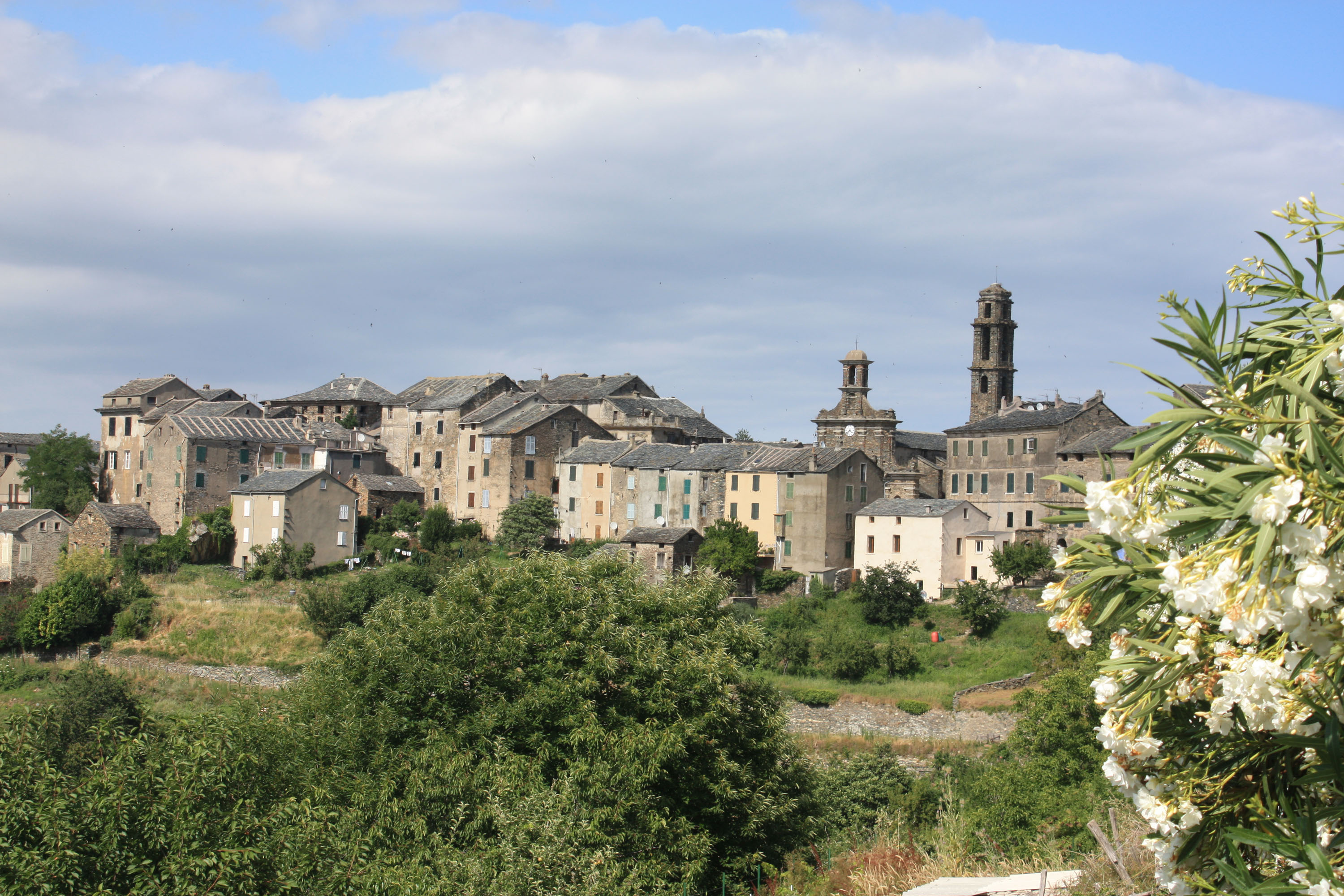
- A general view of Penta-di-Casinca
- Location of Penta-di-Casinca
- Location within France Location within Corsica
- Coordinates: 42°28′07″N 9°27′37″E
- Country: France
- Region: Corsica
- Department: Haute-Corse
- Arrondissement: Corte
- Canton: Casinca-Fumalto

Government
  - Mayor (2020–2026): Yannick Castelli
- Area^{1}: 18.53 km^{2} (7.15 sq mi)
- Elevation: 400 m (1,300 ft)
- Highest elevation: 640 m (2,100 ft)
- Lowest elevation: 0 m (0 ft)
- Population (2023): 3,671
  - Density: 198.1/km^{2} (513.1/sq mi)
- Time zone: UTC+01:00 (CET)
  - Summer (DST): UTC+02:00 (CEST)
- INSEE/Postal code: 2B207 /20213
- ^{1} French Land Register data, which excludes lakes, ponds, glaciers > 1 km^{2} (0.386 sq mi or 247 acres) and river estuaries.

Penta-di-Casinca (French pronunciation: [pɛnta di kazinka]) or Penta di Casinca (Italian pronunciation: [penˈta di ˈkaːzinka]; Corsican: A Penta di Casinca), is a commune in the Haute-Corse department of France on the island of Corsica.

== Population ==
Historical population
| Year | Pop. | ±% p.a. |
|---|---|---|
| 1968 | 683 | — |
| 1975 | 861 | +3.36% |
| 1982 | 1,348 | +6.61% |
| 1990 | 1,917 | +4.50% |
| 1999 | 2,438 | +2.71% |
| 2007 | 2,808 | +1.78% |
| 2012 | 3,247 | +2.95% |
| 2017 | 3,396 | +0.90% |
| 2023 | 3,671 | +1.31% |
Source: INSEE

== See also ==
- Torra di San Pellegrinu
- Communes of the Haute-Corse department
