= Poggio-Mezzana =

- Commune
- Location of Poggio-Mezzana
- Location within France Location within Corsica
- Coordinates: 42°23′56″N 9°29′44″E
- Country: France
- Region: Corsica
- Department: Haute-Corse
- Arrondissement: Corte
- Canton: Castagniccia
- Intercommunality: Costa Verde

Government
  - Mayor (2020–2026): Maurice Chiaramonti
- Area^{1}: 8.9 km^{2} (3.4 sq mi)
- Elevation: 252 m (827 ft)
- Highest elevation: 366 m (1,201 ft)
- Lowest elevation: 0 m (0 ft)
- Population (2023): 885
  - Density: 99/km^{2} (260/sq mi)
- Time zone: UTC+01:00 (CET)
  - Summer (DST): UTC+02:00 (CEST)
- INSEE/Postal code: 2B242 /20230
- ^{1} French Land Register data, which excludes lakes, ponds, glaciers > 1 km^{2} (0.386 sq mi or 247 acres) and river estuaries.

Poggio-Mezzana is a commune in the Haute-Corse department of France on the island of Corsica.

== Population ==
Historical population
Year	Pop.	±% p.a.
1968	194	—
1975	237	+2.90%
1982	287	+2.77%
1990	360	+2.87%
1999	403	+1.26%
2007	648	+6.12%
2012	626	−0.69%
2017	680	+1.67%
2023	885	+4.49%
Source: INSEE

== See also ==
- Communes of the Haute-Corse department
