= Pero-Casevecchie =

- Commune
- Location of Pero-Casevecchie
- Location within France Location within Corsica
- Coordinates: 42°24′55″N 9°27′58″E
- Country: France
- Region: Corsica
- Department: Haute-Corse
- Arrondissement: Corte
- Canton: Casinca-Fumalto
- Intercommunality: Costa Verde

Government
  - Mayor (2025–2026): Jean-Louis Giancoli
- Area^{1}: 4.71 km^{2} (1.82 sq mi)
- Elevation: 490 m (1,610 ft)
- Highest elevation: 1,000 m (3,300 ft)
- Lowest elevation: 200 m (660 ft)
- Population (2023): 109
  - Density: 23.1/km^{2} (59.9/sq mi)
- Time zone: UTC+01:00 (CET)
  - Summer (DST): UTC+02:00 (CEST)
- INSEE/Postal code: 2B210 /20230
- ^{1} French Land Register data, which excludes lakes, ponds, glaciers > 1 km^{2} (0.386 sq mi or 247 acres) and river estuaries.

Pero-Casevecchie (French pronunciation: [pəʁo kazvɛkʃi]) is a commune in the Haute-Corse department of France on the island of Corsica.

== Population ==
Historical population
Year	Pop.	±% p.a.
1968	244	—
1975	158	−6.02%
1982	112	−4.80%
1990	106	−0.69%
1999	111	+0.51%
2007	115	+0.44%
2012	128	+2.17%
2017	123	−0.79%
2023	109	−1.99%
Source: INSEE

== See also ==
- Communes of the Haute-Corse department
