= Taglio-Isolaccio =

- Commune
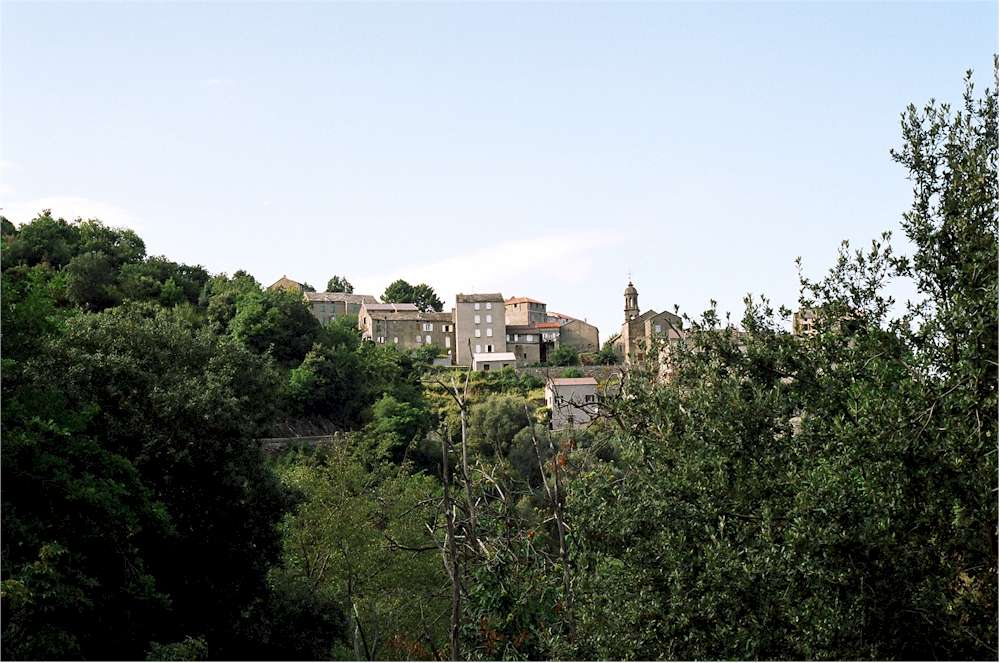
- A general view of Taglio-Isolaccio
- Location of Taglio-Isolaccio
- Location within France Location within Corsica
- Coordinates: 42°26′09″N 9°28′14″E
- Country: France
- Region: Corsica
- Department: Haute-Corse
- Arrondissement: Corte
- Canton: Casinca-Fumalto
- Intercommunality: Costa Verde

Government
  - Mayor (2020–2026): Marie-Thérèse Mariotti
- Area^{1}: 11.47 km^{2} (4.43 sq mi)
- Elevation: 340 m (1,120 ft)
- Highest elevation: 525 m (1,722 ft)
- Lowest elevation: 0 m (0 ft)
- Population (2023): 623
  - Density: 54.3/km^{2} (141/sq mi)
- Time zone: UTC+01:00 (CET)
  - Summer (DST): UTC+02:00 (CEST)
- INSEE/Postal code: 2B318 /20230
- ^{1} French Land Register data, which excludes lakes, ponds, glaciers > 1 km^{2} (0.386 sq mi or 247 acres) and river estuaries.

Taglio-Isolaccio is a commune in the Haute-Corse department of France on the island of Corsica.

== Population ==
Historical population
Year	Pop.	±% p.a.
1968	420	—
1975	383	−1.31%
1982	364	−0.72%
1990	526	+4.71%
1999	535	+0.19%
2007	523	−0.28%
2012	565	+1.56%
2017	572	+0.25%
2023	623	+1.43%
Source: INSEE

== See also ==
- Communes of the Haute-Corse department
