= Arbellara =

Commune in Corsica, France

- Commune
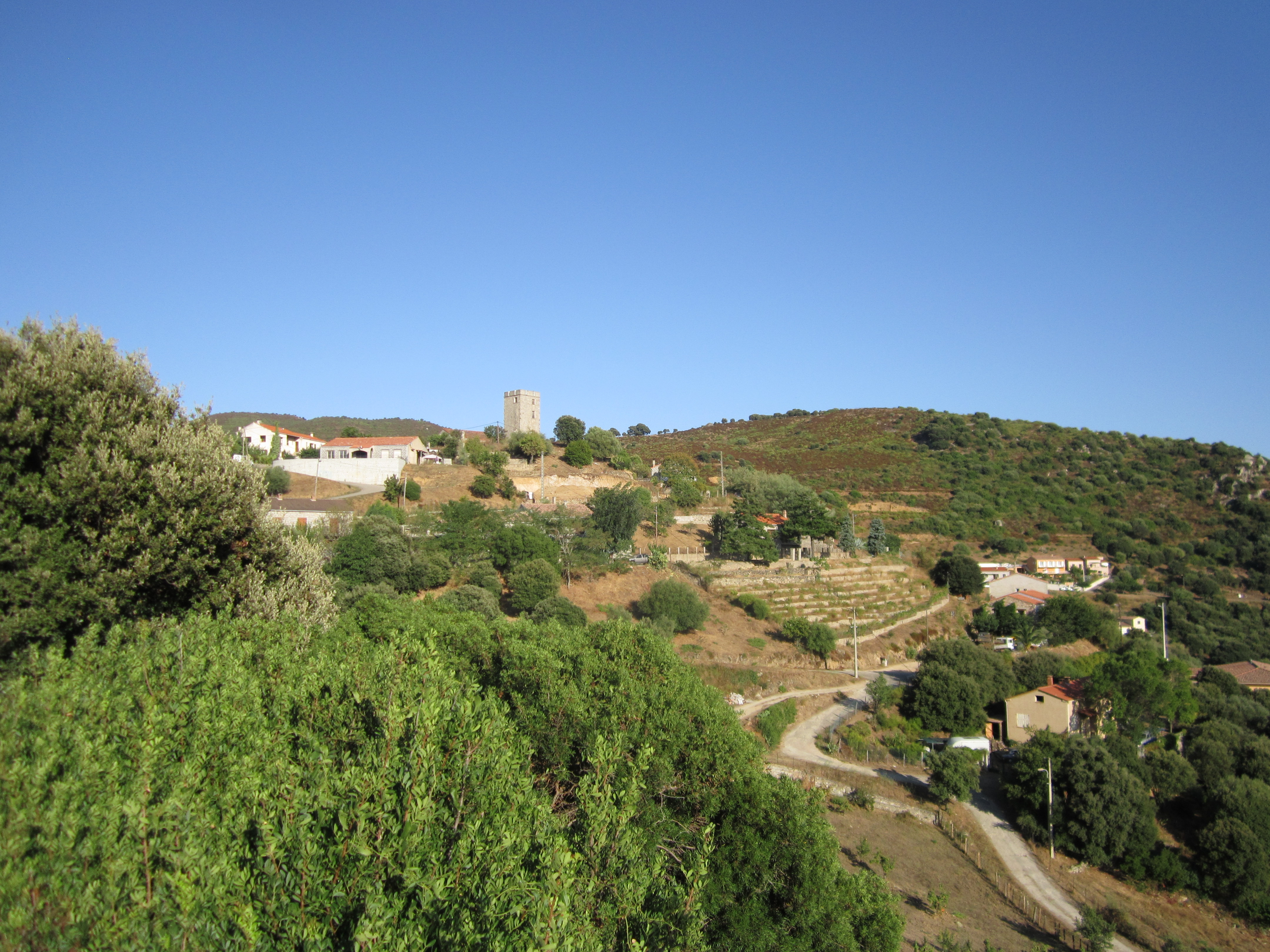
- A general view of Arbellara
- Location of Arbellara
- Location within France Location within Corsica
- Coordinates: 41°40′58″N 8°59′27″E
- Country: France
- Region: Corsica
- Department: Corse-du-Sud
- Arrondissement: Sartène
- Canton: Sartenais-Valinco
- Intercommunality: CC Sartenais Valinco Taravo

Government
  - Mayor (2020–2026): Marie-Antoinette Rotily Forcioli-Carrier
- Area^{1}: 11.29 km^{2} (4.36 sq mi)
- Elevation: 350 m (1,150 ft)
- Highest elevation: 640 m (2,100 ft)
- Lowest elevation: 23 m (75 ft)
- Population (2023): 165
  - Density: 14.6/km^{2} (37.9/sq mi)
- Time zone: UTC+01:00 (CET)
  - Summer (DST): UTC+02:00 (CEST)
- INSEE/Postal code: 2A018 /20110
- ^{1} French Land Register data, which excludes lakes, ponds, glaciers > 1 km^{2} (0.386 sq mi or 247 acres) and river estuaries.

Arbellara (French pronunciation: [aʁbɛlaʁa]; in Corsican Arbiddali, pronounced [ar.bi.ˈɖːaː.li]) is a commune in the Corse-du-Sud department of France on the island of Corsica. It is part of the micro-region of Viggiano in the north of the Rocca region.

== Geography ==
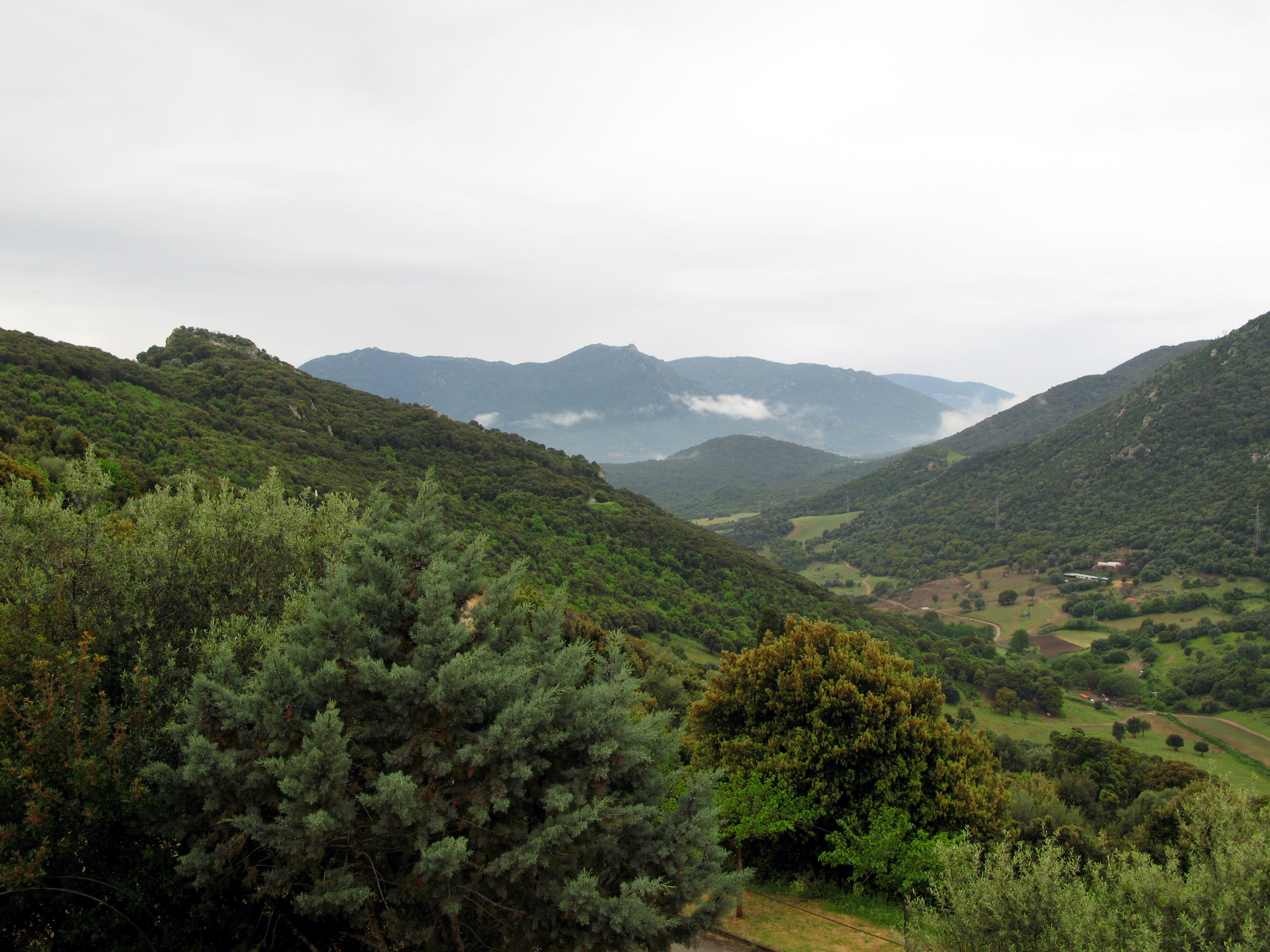
Green Valley in spring.

Arbellara is located some 6 km east of Propriano and 2 km south of Fozzano. Access to the commune is by road D19 from Viggianello in the west which passes through the village then continues north to Fozzano. The D119 road goes south from the village then turns south-west to join the D69 which goes north-east then north to Loreto-di-Tallano. Apart from the village there is also the hamlet of Acoravo in the south-east of the commune at the intersection of the D119 and D69. The commune is mostly mountainous and forested.

The southern border of the commune is formed by the Rizzanese river which flows west to the Mediterranean Sea south of Propriano.

== History ==
- In 1583 the commune was pillaged and the inhabitants massacred by the Turks.
- After reprisals by the villagers, it was again pillaged by the Turks in 1584.

== Administration ==
List of Successive Mayors

From	To	Name	Party
		Pascal Giustiniani	
1983	1995	Jacques Rotily Forcioli	DVD
1995	2008	Michèle Rotily Forcioli	DVD
2008	2026	Marie-Antoinette Forcioli-Carrier	DVD

== Demography ==
The inhabitants of the commune are known as Arbellarais or Arbellaraises in French.

Historical population

Year	Pop.	±% p.a.
1800	230	—
1821	284	+1.01%
1846	332	+0.63%
1872	420	+0.91%
1901	471	+0.40%
1926	521	+0.40%
1936	605	+1.51%
1946	413	−3.75%
1954	254	−5.90%
1962	169	−4.97%

Year	Pop.	±% p.a.
1968	162	−0.70%
1975	153	−0.81%
1982	137	−1.57%
1990	120	−1.64%
1999	111	−0.86%
2007	133	+2.29%
2012	143	+1.46%
2017	156	+1.76%
2023	165	+0.94%

Source: EHESS and INSEE

== Culture and heritage ==
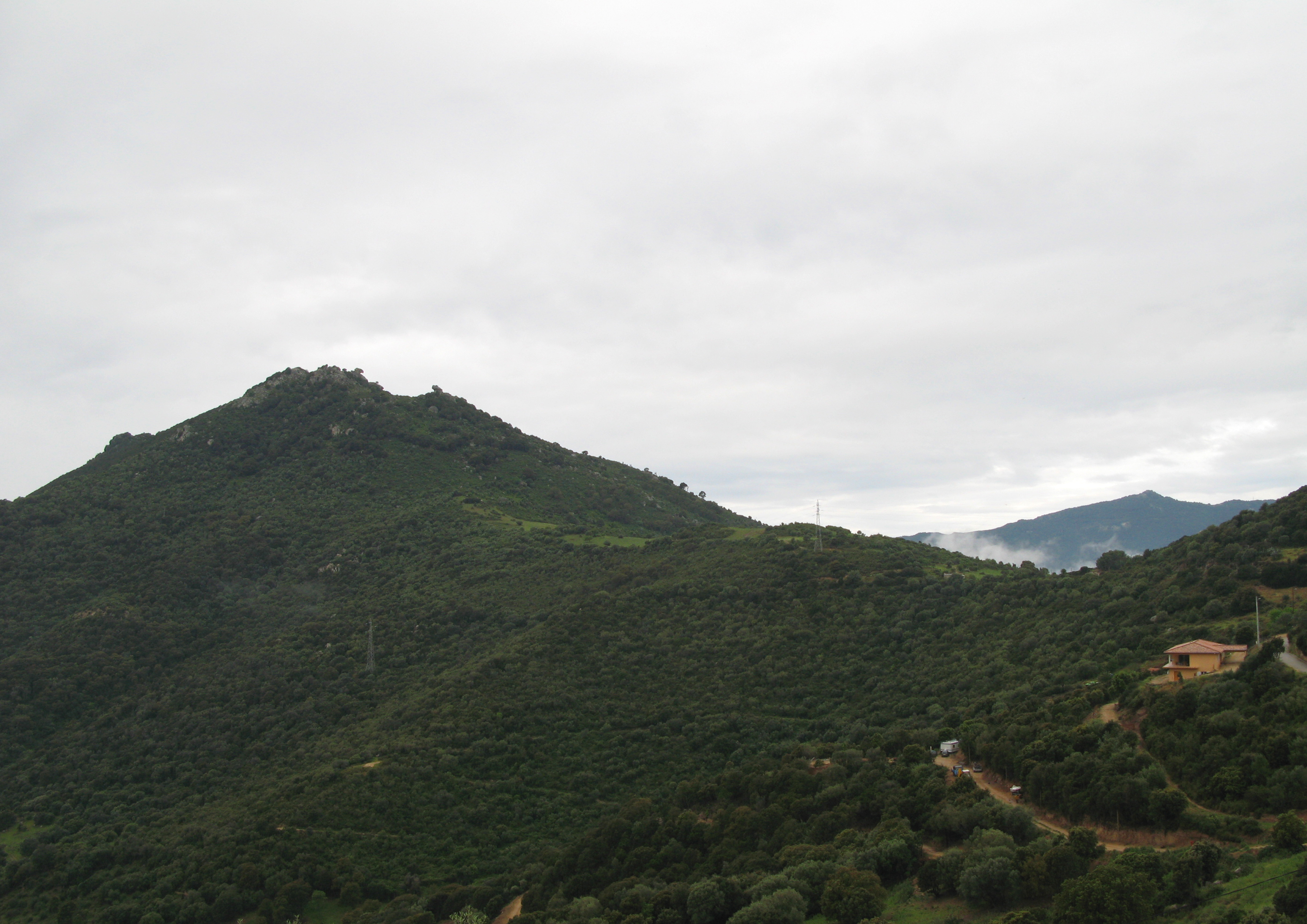
Arbellara mountain overlooking the valley

=== Civil heritage ===
The commune has many buildings and structures that are registered as historical monuments:

- Houses (16th-19th century)
- The Spin'a Cavallu Genoese Bridge (16th century), a hump-backed bridge on the Rizzanèse river.
- It has been used as a special stage in the Tour de Corse.

=== Religious heritage ===
The Parish Church of Saint Sebastian (18th century) is registered as an historical monument. The Church contains many items that are registered as historical objects:

- An Exhibition (19th century)
- A Sunburst Monstrance (19th century)
- A Chalice with Paten (19th century)
- Stations of the Cross (19th century)
- The Furniture in the Church (19th century)
- A Sunburst Monstrance (19th century)
- A Chalice with Paten (1) (19th century)
- A Chalice with Paten (2) (19th century)
- A Statue: Christ on the Cross (19th century)
- A Statue: Salvator Mundi (19th century)
- A Statue: Saint Roch (19th century)
- A Statue: Saint Sebastian (19th century)
- A Statue: Virgin and child (19th century)
- A Statue: Saint Gavin (19th century)

=== Environmental heritage ===
- The Marteau et l'Enclume (Hammer and Anvil), rocks dominating the heights of the commune.

=== Culinary Specialities ===
- Present day: sheep cheese, lamb milk.
- In the past: olive oil (oil press), vineyards (wine presses in homes).
- Blessing of the houses on Holy Saturday: the priest is offered eggs, ham, and sheep cheeses.

== See also ==
- Communes of the Corse-du-Sud department
