= Baraci =

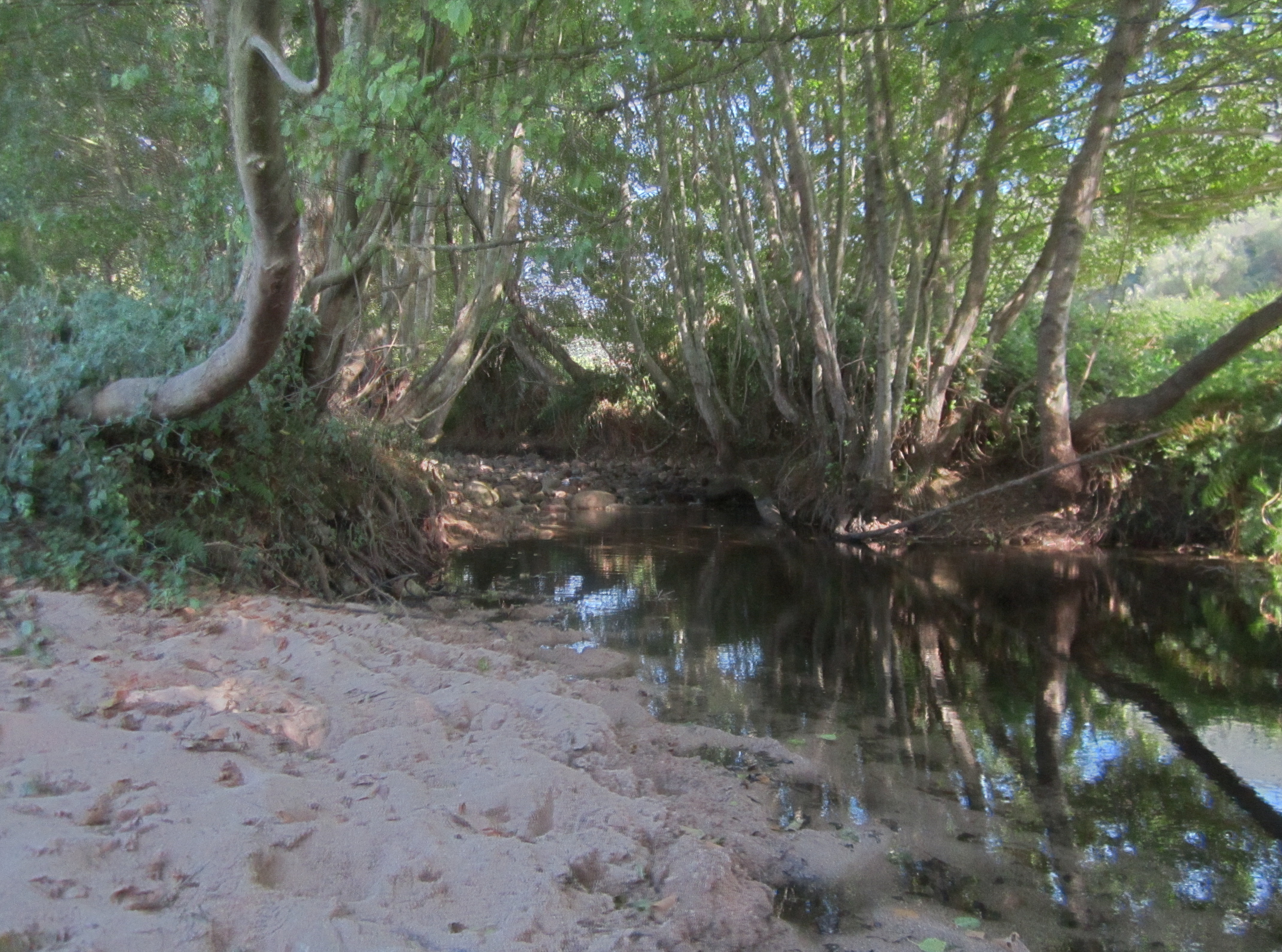
- Baraci near the D257 bridge in Fozzano

- Location within Corsica Location within France

Location
- Country: France
- Region: Corsica
- Department: Corse-du-Sud

Physical characteristics
- Mouth: Mediterranean Sea
  - coordinates: 41.6911°N 8.9131°E
- Length: 16.46 kilometres (10.23 mi)

The Baraci (or Baracci) is a small coastal river in the southwest of the department of Corse-du-Sud, Corsica, France.

== Course ==
The Baraci is 16.46 kilometres (10.23 mi) long. It crosses the communes of Fozzano, Moca-Croce, Olmeto, Santa-Maria-Figaniella, Viggianello and Zérubia. The Baraci rises to the east of the 1,072 metres (3,517 ft) Monte Acciaiu. It flows in a generally southwest direction to enter the Golfe du Valinco near the village of Capiniellu at the north end of the Plage de Baracci. The D557 and then D257 roads follow it for most of its course.

There are several places for swimming, one with a lovely waterfall. In the high season the river is used by canoeists. Visitors may also practice canyoning with slides, jumps, zipline and rappelling.

== Tributaries ==
The following streams (ruisseaux) are tributaries of the Oso (ordered by length) and sub-tributaries:

- Mulini: 8 km (5.0 mi)
- Undala: 6 km (3.7 mi)
- Mulina: 6 km (3.7 mi)
  - Barbaruzi: 3 km (1.9 mi)
- la Pointe de Zibo: 5 km (3.1 mi)
- Fracintu: 4 km (2.5 mi)
- la Scala: 4 km (2.5 mi)
- Capannajola: 3 km (1.9 mi)
- Ortu Vecchiu: 3 km (1.9 mi)
  - Cannelli: 2 km (1.2 mi)
  - Monte Acciaiu: 1 km (0.62 mi)
- Barab: 2 km (1.2 mi)
- Firuletu: 2 km (1.2 mi)
- Giavina: 2 km (1.2 mi)

== Sources ==
- "Baraci", Paradisu (in French)
- "Relation: Rivière Baraci (8537828)", OpenStreetMap
- "Rivière Baraci", Sandre (in French)
- "The Baracci Canyon", CanyonCorse
