= Argiusta-Moriccio =

Commune in Corsica, France

- Commune
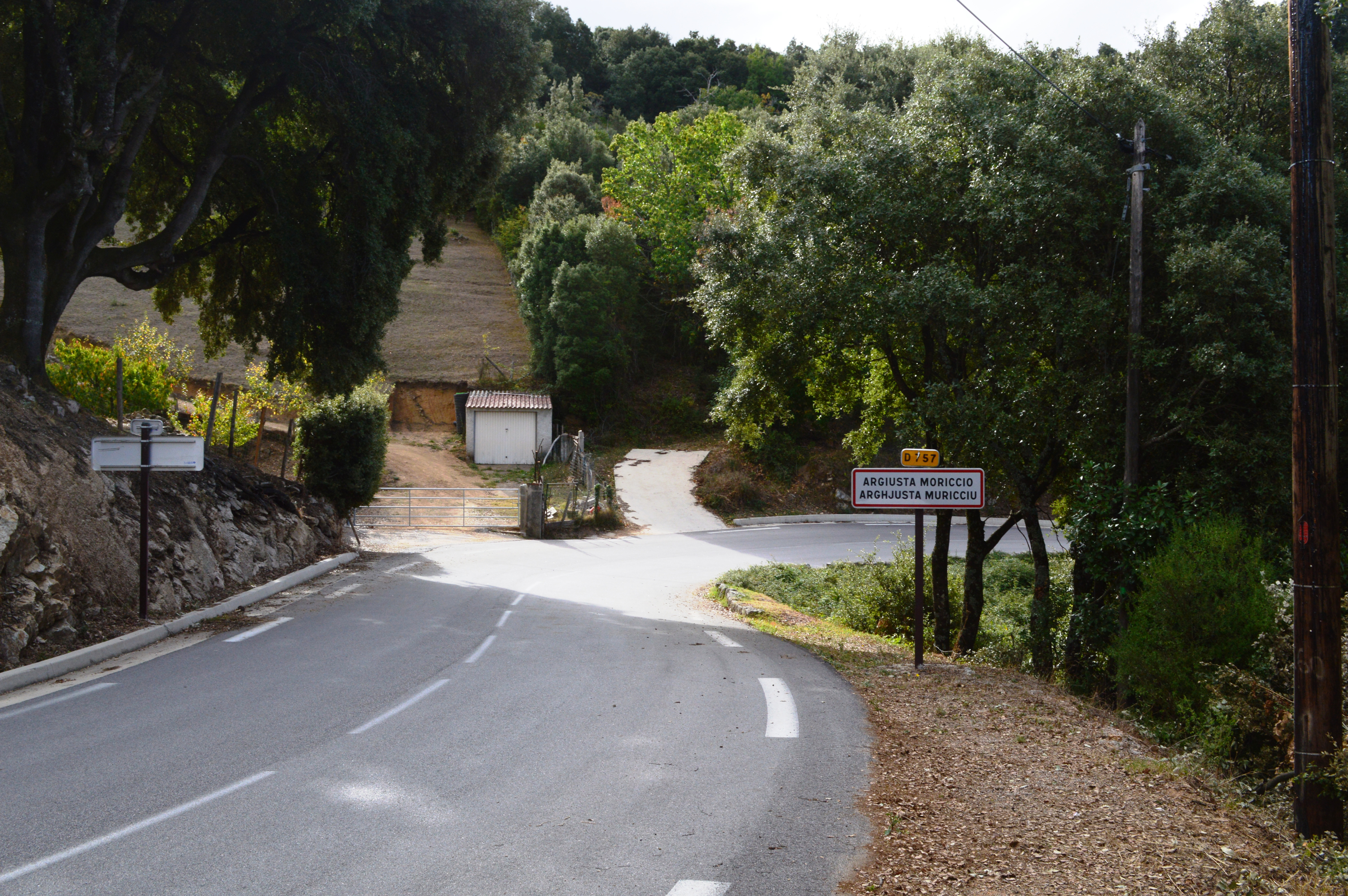
- The road into Argiusta-Moriccio

- Coat of arms
- Location of Argiusta-Moriccio
- Location within France Location within Corsica
- Coordinates: 41°48′57″N 9°01′27″E
- Country: France
- Region: Corsica
- Department: Corse-du-Sud
- Arrondissement: Sartène
- Canton: Taravo-Ornano
- Intercommunality: CC Sartenais Valinco Taravo

Government
  - Mayor (2020–2026): Paul-Joseph Caitucoli
- Area^{1}: 10.3 km^{2} (4.0 sq mi)
- Elevation: 450 m (1,480 ft)
- Highest elevation: 1,419 m (4,656 ft)
- Lowest elevation: 200 m (660 ft)
- Population (2023): 75
  - Density: 7.3/km^{2} (19/sq mi)
- Time zone: UTC+01:00 (CET)
  - Summer (DST): UTC+02:00 (CEST)
- INSEE/Postal code: 2A021 /20140
- ^{1} French Land Register data, which excludes lakes, ponds, glaciers > 1 km^{2} (0.386 sq mi or 247 acres) and river estuaries.

Argiusta-Moriccio (Italian pronunciation: [ardʒusta mɔrittʃo]; Corsican: Arghjusta è Muricciu) is a commune in the French department of Corse-du-Sud, Corsica.

== Geography ==
Argiusta-Moriccio is located 6 km north-east of Petreto-Bicchisano and 8 km south-east of Grosseto-Prugna. Access to the commune is by the D757 road from Bicchisano in the south-west passing through the commune and the village and continuing north-east to Olivese. Apart from the village there is the hamlet of Moriccio north-west of the village. The commune is heavily forested and mountainous throughout.

The north-western border of the commune is a river flowing to the west.

== Administration ==
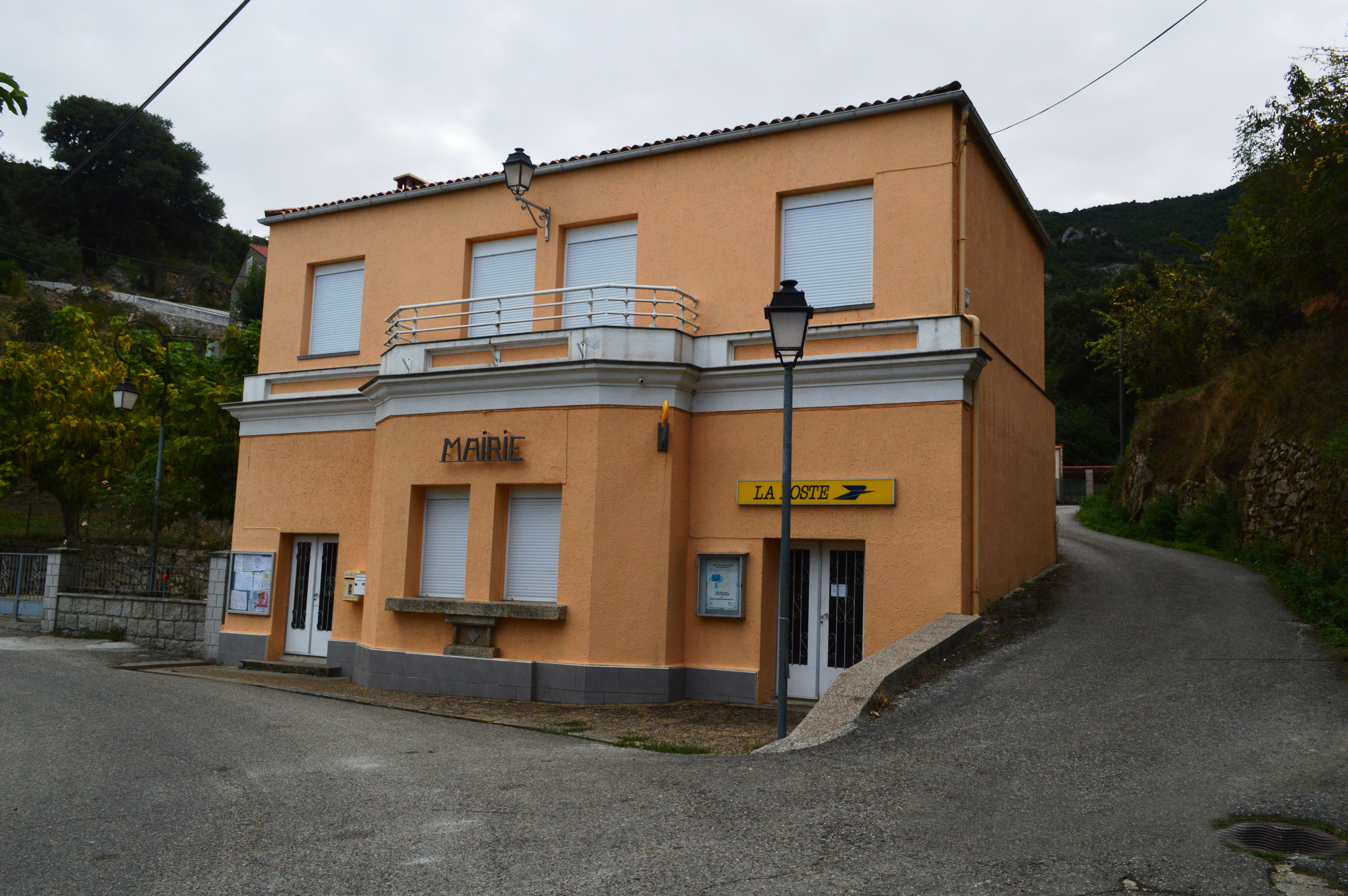
The Town Hall

List of Successive Mayors

From	To	Name	Party
2001	2014	Michel Peretti	UMP
2014	2026	Paul-Joseph Caitucoli	

== Demography ==
Historical population

Year	Pop.	±% p.a.
1800	224	—
1821	189	−0.81%
1846	265	+1.36%
1872	357	+1.15%
1901	577	+1.67%
1926	515	−0.45%
1946	300	−2.67%
1954	283	−0.73%
1962	168	−6.31%

Year	Pop.	±% p.a.
1968	137	−3.34%
1975	127	−1.08%
1982	105	−2.68%
1990	93	−1.51%
1999	77	−2.08%
2007	88	+1.68%
2012	79	−2.13%
2017	76	−0.77%
2023	75	−0.22%

Source: EHESS and INSEE

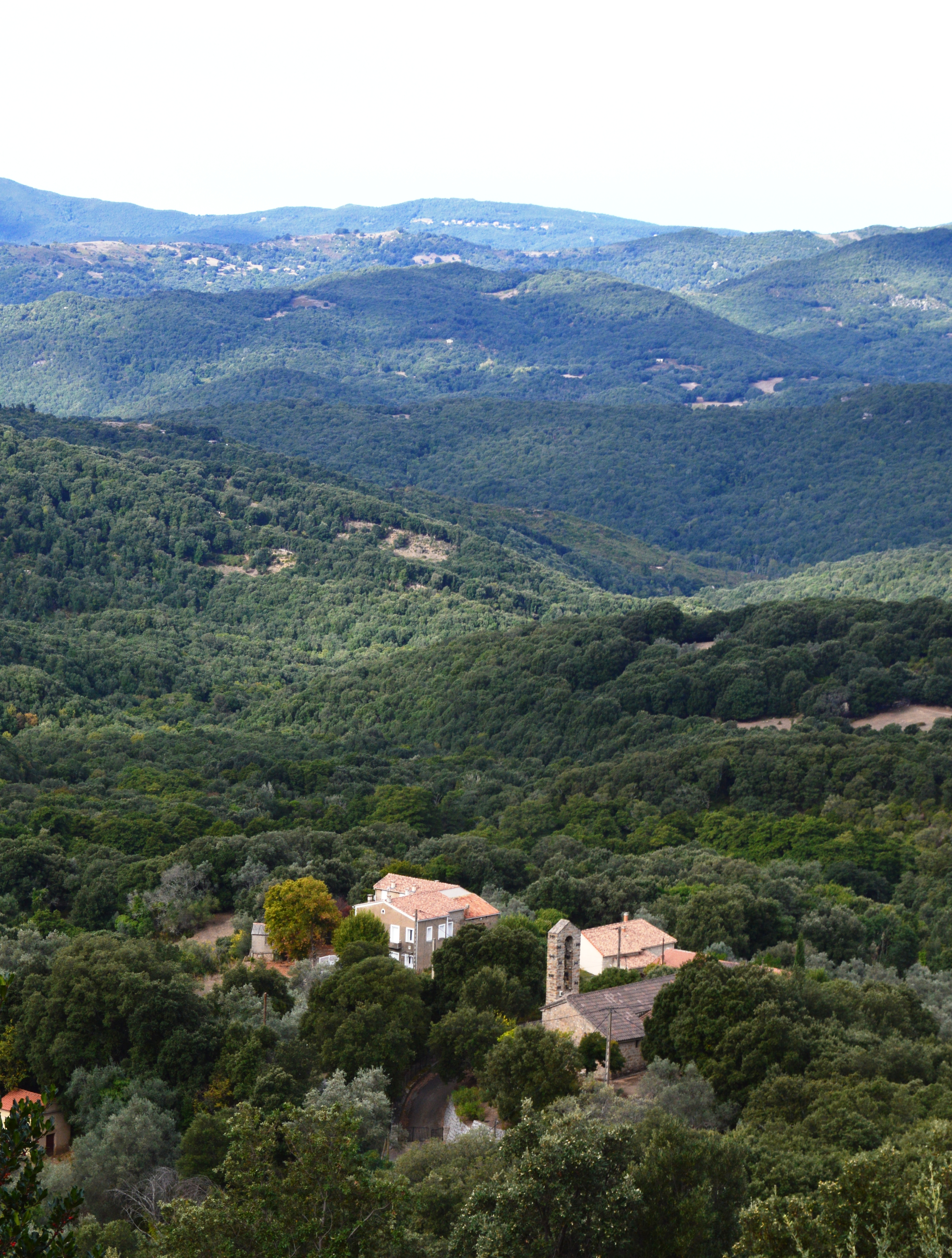
View over Argiusta-Moriccio

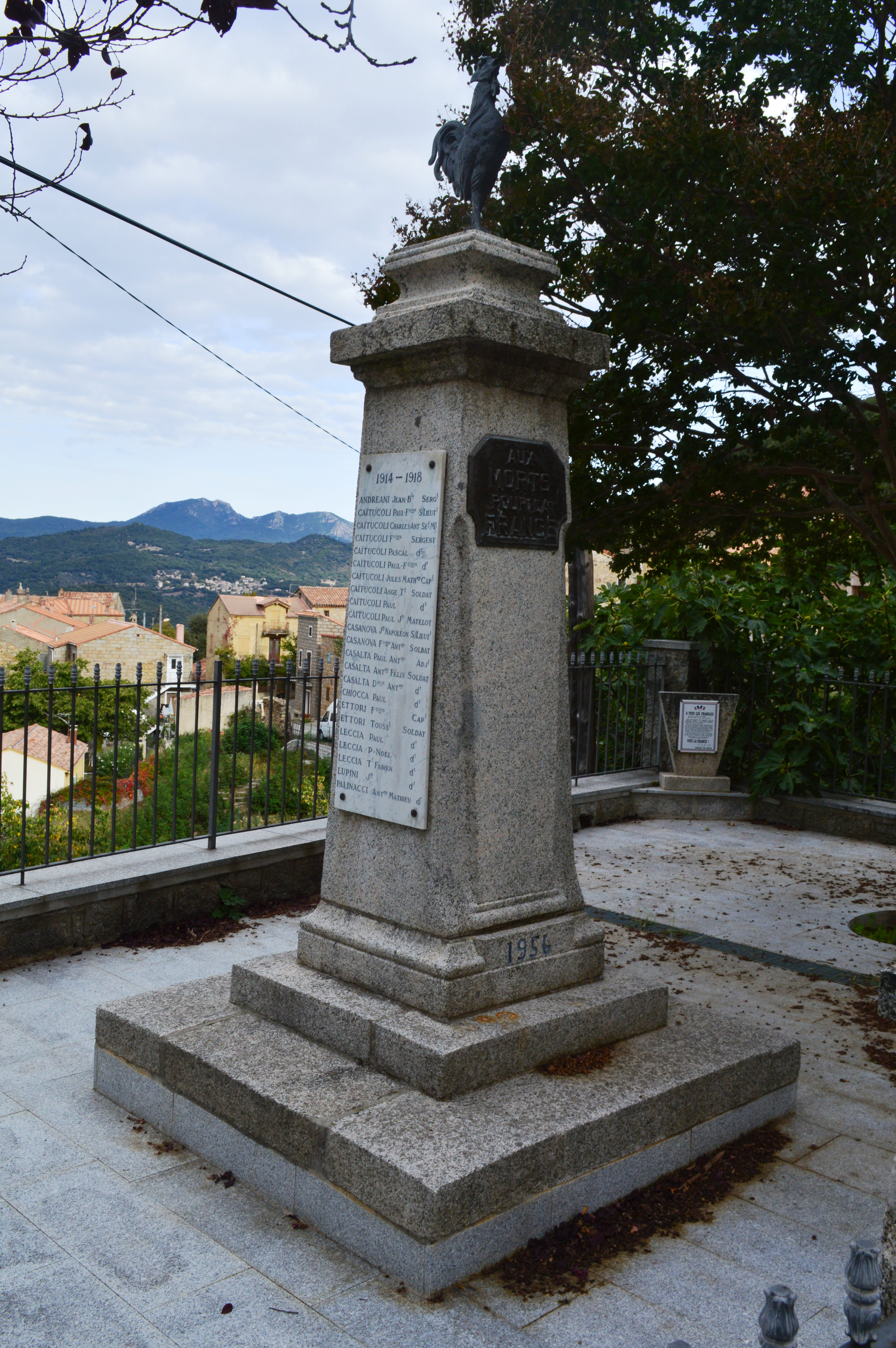
Argiusta-Moriccio War Memorial

== Culture and heritage ==
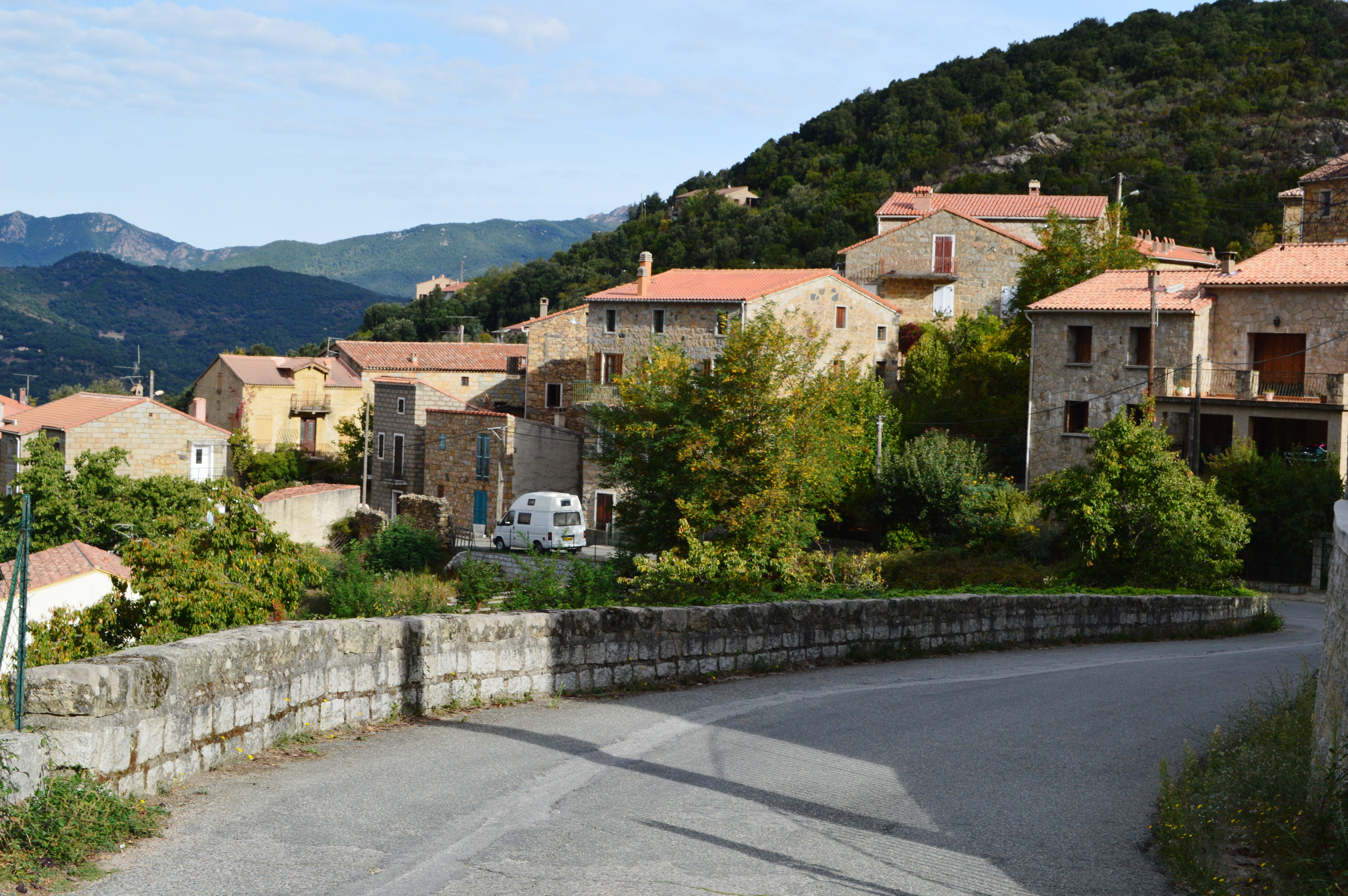
Argiusta-Moriccio Village

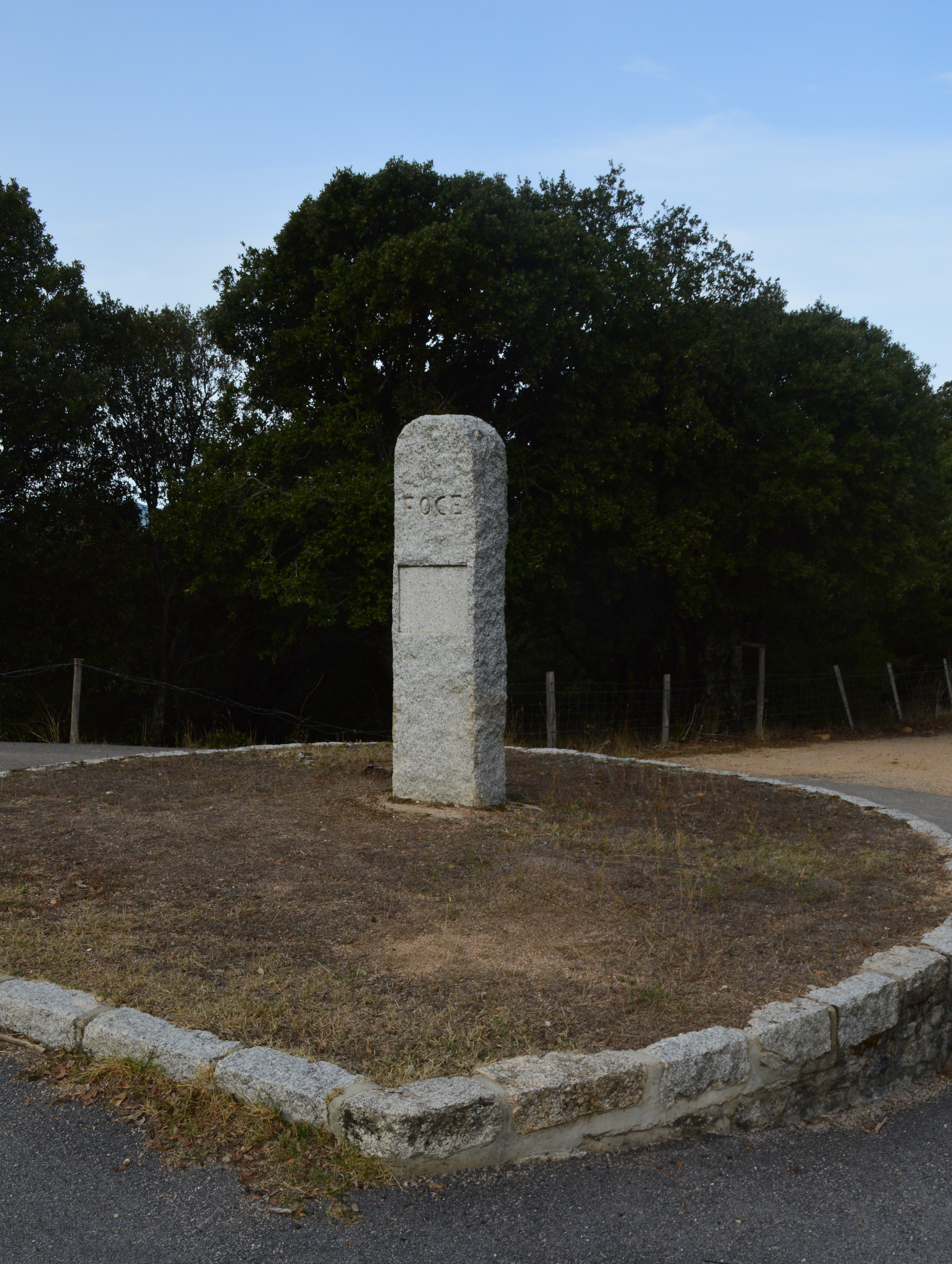
The Torréen de Foce monument

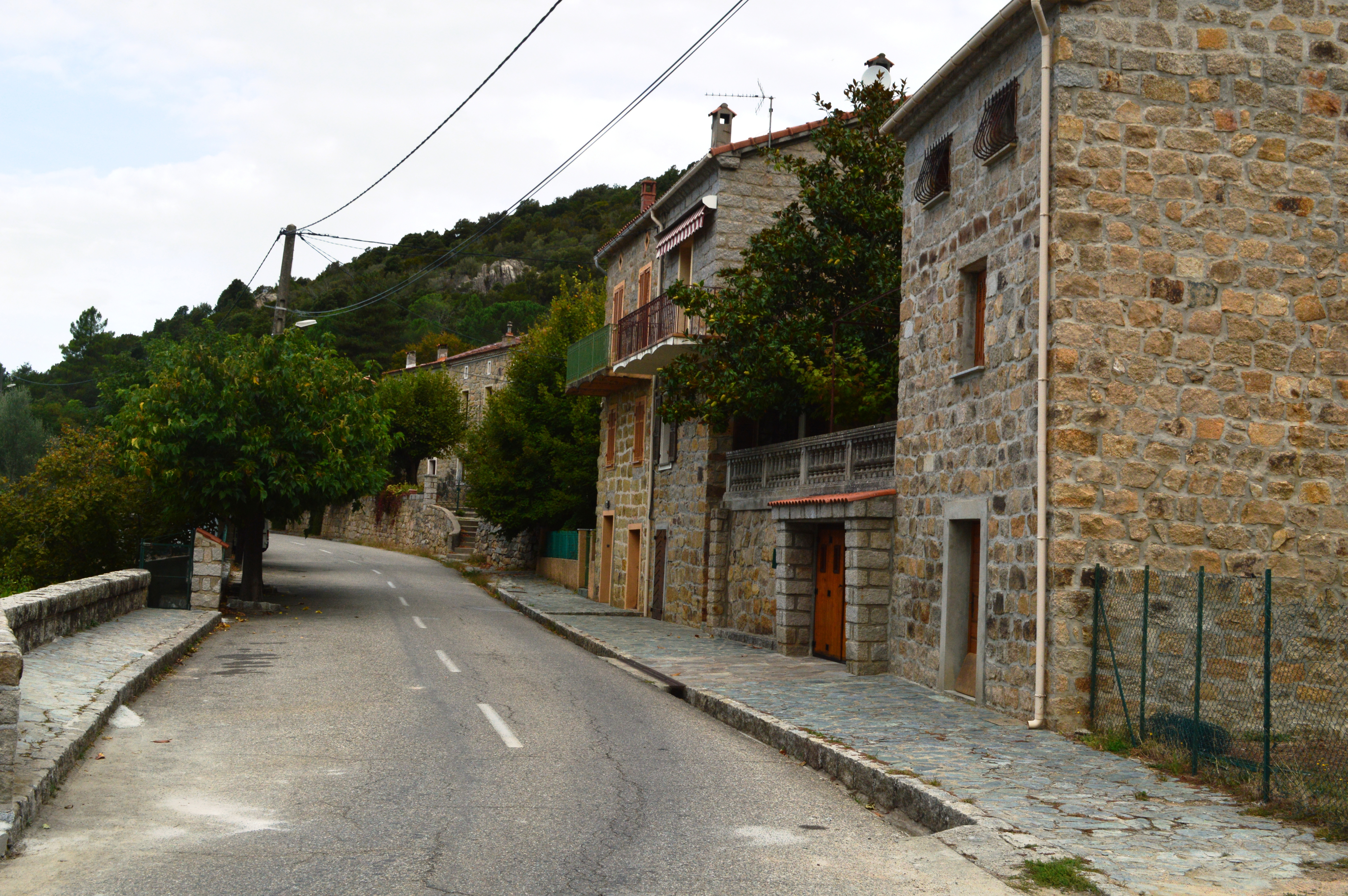
A street in Argiusta-Moriccio

=== Civil heritage ===
The commune has a number of buildings and structures that are registered as historical monuments:

- A House at Argiusta (1581)
- A House at Moriccio (1777)
- A House of a Notable at Argiusta (18th century)
- A House of a Notable at Argiusta (1875)
- Houses (16th, 18th, & 19th centuries)
- The War memorial at Argiusta (1956)

Other sites of interest

- Torréen de Foce monument

=== Religious heritage ===
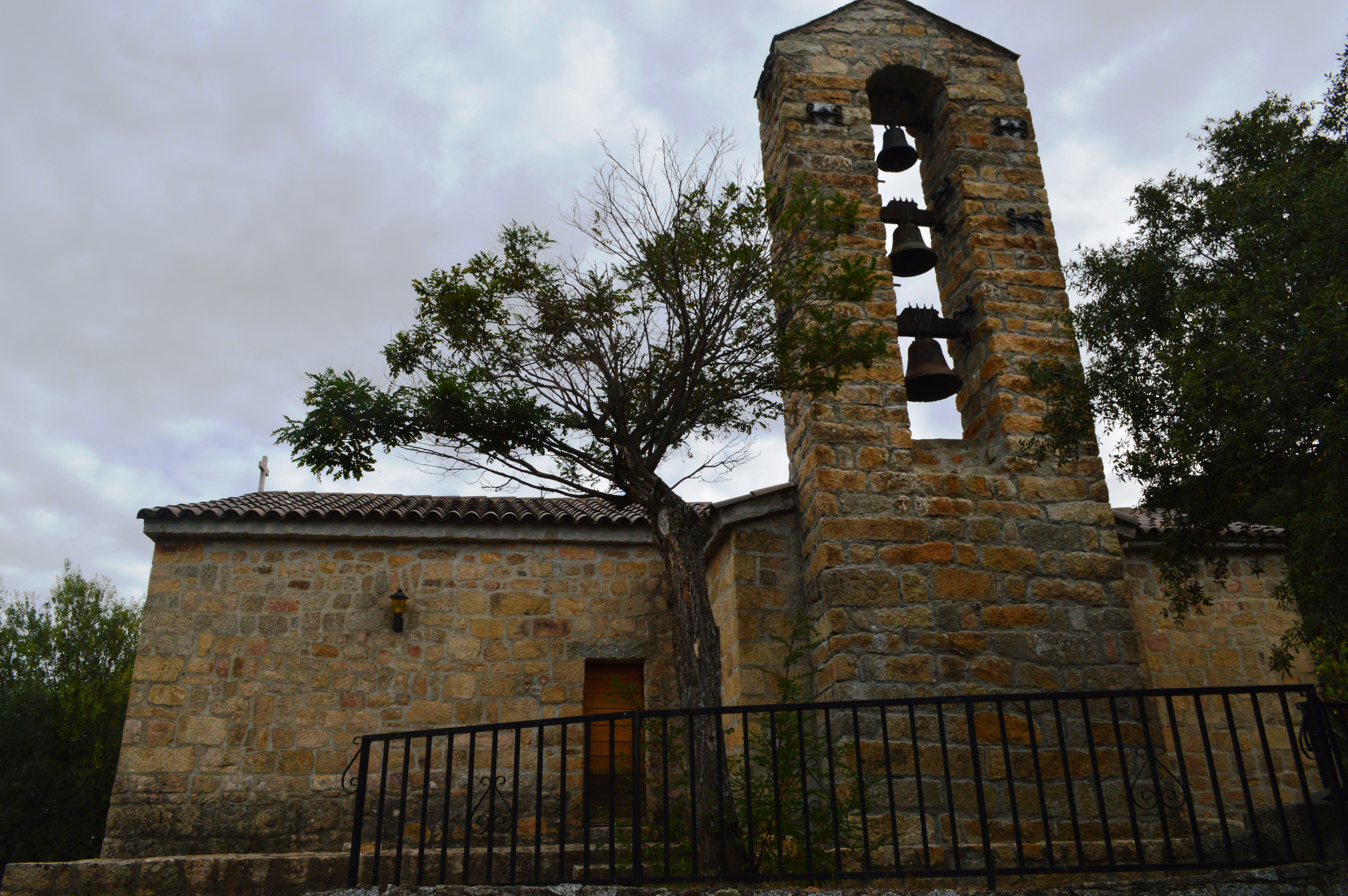
The Church of Saint Hippolyte and Saint Cassien

The Parish Church of Saint Hippolyte and Saint Cassien (1746) is registered as an historical monument. The Church contains many items that are registered as historical objects:

- The complete Secondary Altar of the Virgin (18th century)
- The complete Secondary Altar of the Brotherhood of the Rosary (18th century)
- A Group Sculpture: Saint Vincent de Paul and two children (19th century)
- An Altar Painting: Presenting a Scapular to the saints by the Virgin and child (1870)
- A Painting: Meditation of Saint Madeleine (19th century)
- An Altar Painting: Donation of the Rosary (18th century)
- A Chasuble, Chalice cover, and Stole (19th century)
- A Chasuble and 2 Dalmatics (19th century)
- A Chasuble, Chalice cover, and Humeral cover (19th century)
- A Chalice with Paten (2) (19th century)
- A Chalice with Paten (1) (19th century)
- The Furniture in the Church

Historical objects in the Church

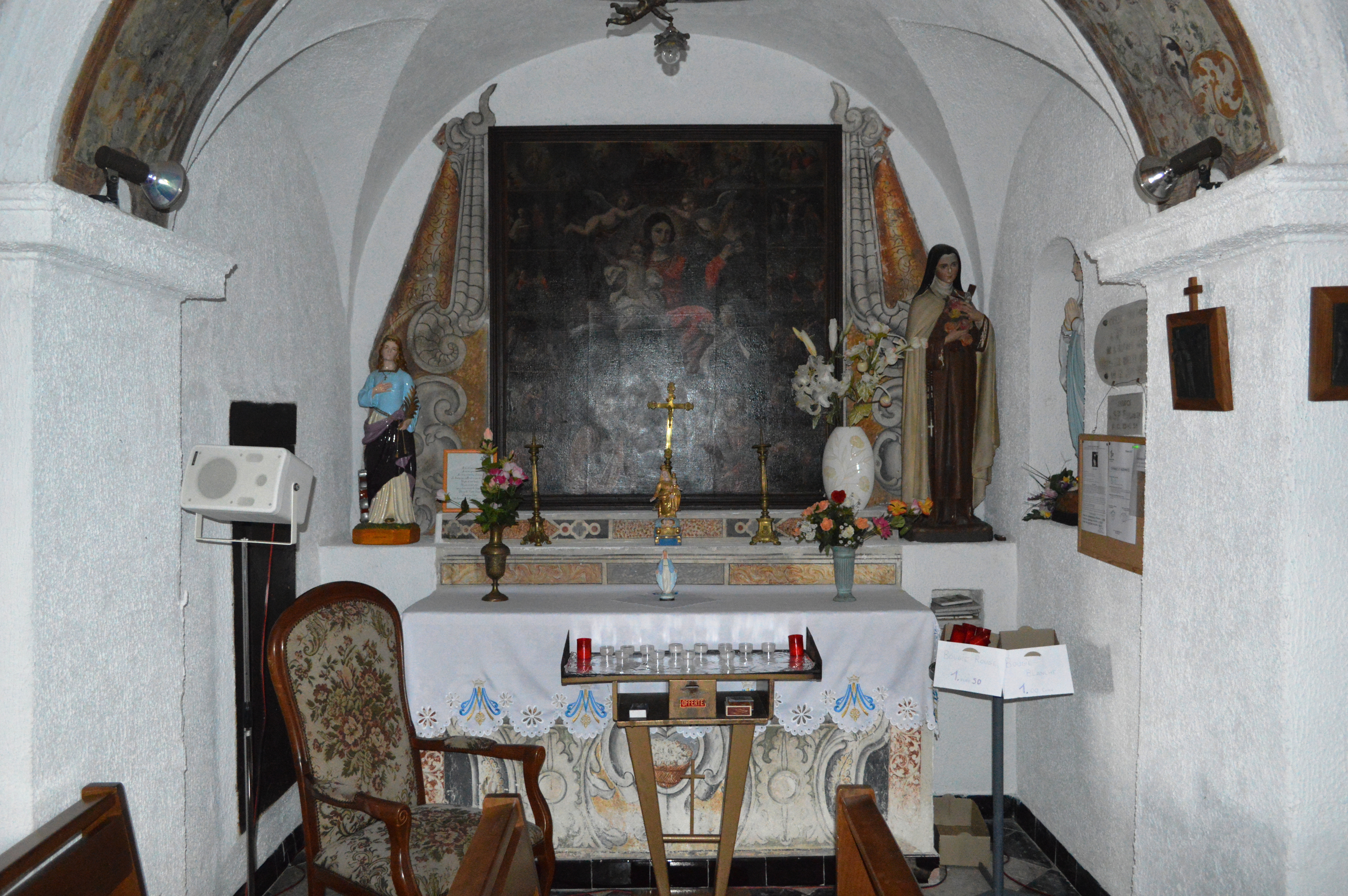
The Main Altar

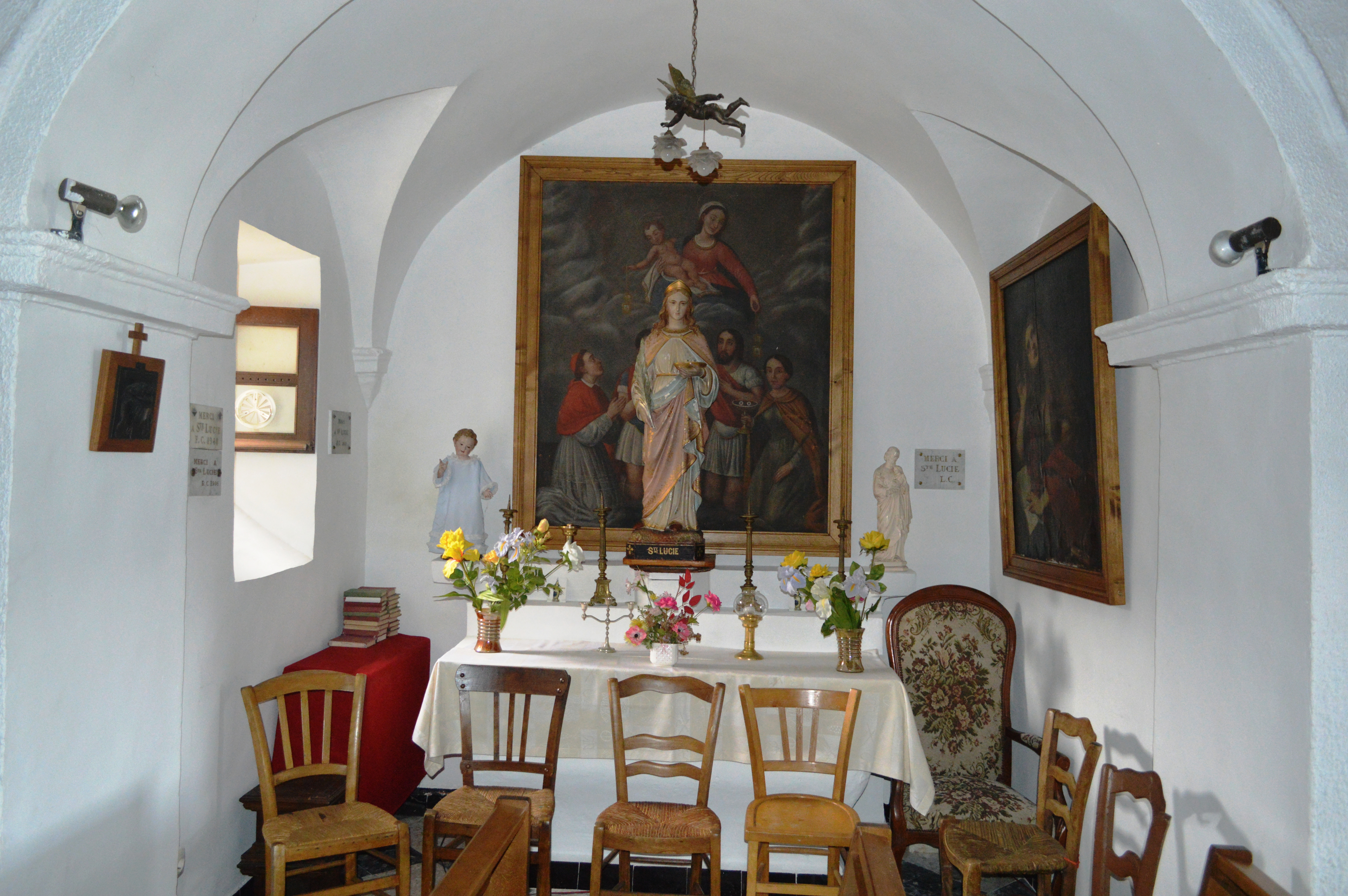
Secondary Altar

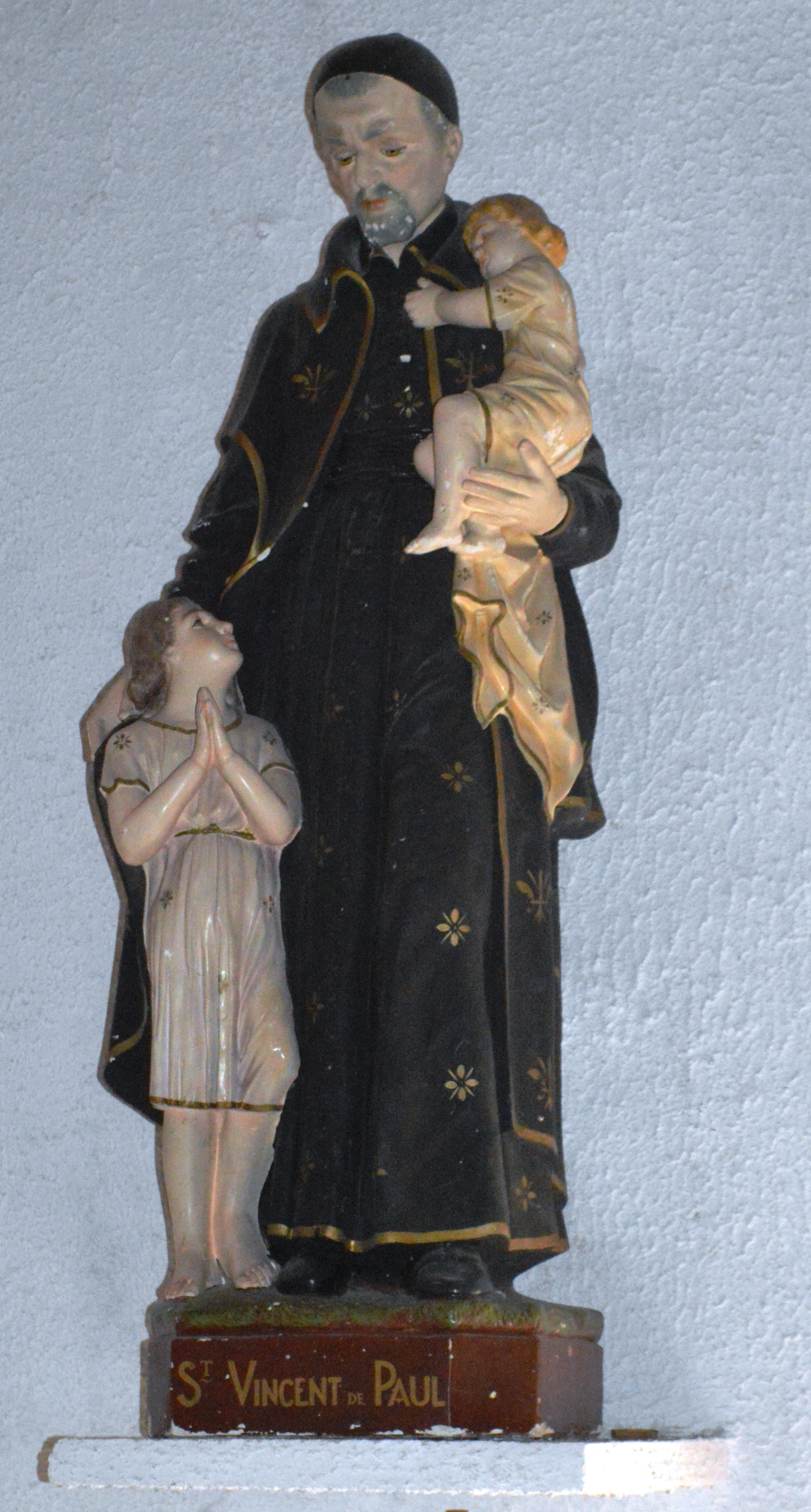
The Statue of Saint Vincent de Paul and two children

== See also ==
- Communes of the Corse-du-Sud department
