= Viggianello =

Viggianello may refer to:

- Viggianello, Basilicata, town and comune in the province of Potenza, in the Southern Italian region of Basilicata
- Viggianello, Corse-du-Sud, commune in the Corse-du-Sud department of France on the island of Corsica
