= Arrondissement of Sartène =

Coordinates: 41.6217°N 8.9742°E

Sartène
- Arrondissement
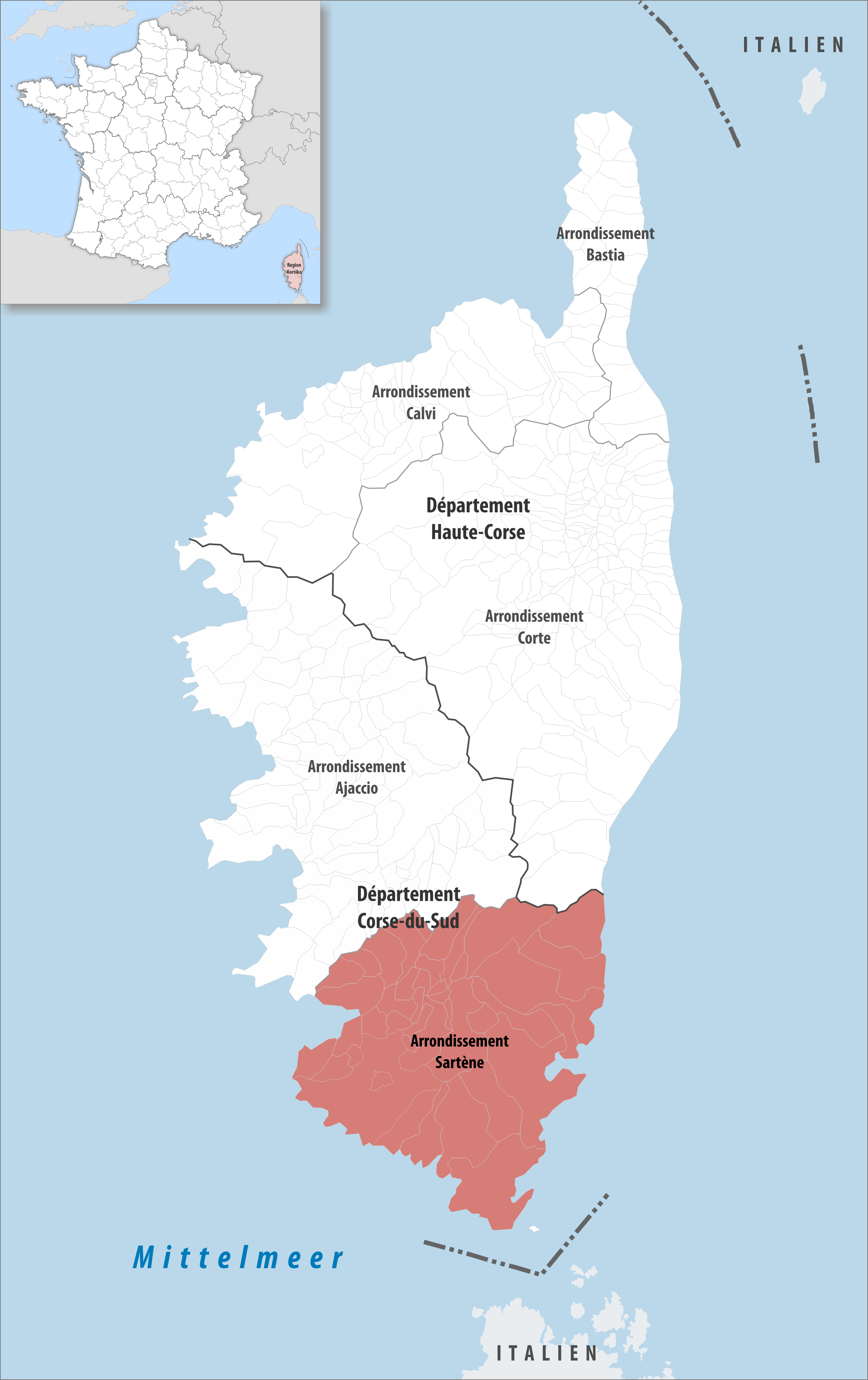
- Location within the region Corsica
- Country: France
- Region: Corsica
- Department: Corse-du-Sud
- No. of communes: {{{nbcomm}}}
- Area: 1,789.9 km^{2} (691.1 sq mi)
- Population (2023): 43,186
  - Density: 24.128/km^{2} (62.490/sq mi)
- INSEE code: 2A4

The arrondissement of Sartène (Corsican: circundariu di Sartè) is an arrondissement of France in the Corse-du-Sud department in the territorial collectivity of Corsica. It has 43 communes. Its population is 41,724 (2021), and its area is 1,789.9 km^{2} (691.1 sq mi).

== Composition ==
The communes of the arrondissement of Sartène, and their INSEE codes, are:

1. Altagène (2A011)
2. Arbellara (2A018)
3. Argiusta-Moriccio (2A021)
4. Aullène (2A024)
5. Belvédère-Campomoro (2A035)
6. Bilia (2A038)
7. Bonifacio (2A041)
8. Carbini (2A061)
9. Cargiaca (2A066)
10. Casalabriva (2A071)
11. Conca (2A092)
12. Figari (2A114)
13. Foce (2A115)
14. Fozzano (2A118)
15. Giuncheto (2A127)
16. Granace (2A128)
17. Grossa (2A129)
18. Lecci (2A139)
19. Levie (2A142)
20. Loreto-di-Tallano (2A146)
21. Mela (2A158)
22. Moca-Croce (2A160)
23. Monacia-d'Aullène (2A163)
24. Olmeto (2A189)
25. Olmiccia (2A191)
26. Petreto-Bicchisano (2A211)
27. Pianottoli-Caldarello (2A215)
28. Porto-Vecchio (2A247)
29. Propriano (2A249)
30. Quenza (2A254)
31. Sainte-Lucie-de-Tallano (2A308)
32. San-Gavino-di-Carbini (2A300)
33. Santa-Maria-Figaniella (2A310)
34. Sari-Solenzara (2A269)
35. Sartène (2A272)
36. Serra-di-Scopamène (2A278)
37. Sollacaro (2A284)
38. Sorbollano (2A285)
39. Sotta (2A288)
40. Viggianello (2A349)
41. Zérubia (2A357)
42. Zonza (2A362)
43. Zoza (2A363)

== History ==
The arrondissement of Sartène was created as part of the department Liamone in 1800. Between 1811 and 1976 it was an arrondissement of the department Corse, since 1976 it has been an arrondissement of the department Corse-du-Sud. In March 2017 it lost the commune Olivese to the arrondissement of Ajaccio.

As a result of the reorganisation of the cantons of France which came into effect in 2015, the borders of the cantons are no longer related to the borders of the arrondissements. The cantons of the arrondissement of Sartène were, as of January 2015:

1. Bonifacio
2. Figari
3. Levie
4. Olmeto
5. Petreto-Bicchisano
6. Porto-Vecchio
7. Sartène
8. Tallano-Scopamène
