= Genoa Subport Tunnel =

- The tunnel's project
- Interactive map of Genoa Subport Tunnel

Overview
- Other name: Tunnel subportuale di Genova (Italian)
- Location: Genoa, Italy
- Status: Under construction
- Crosses: Port of Genoa
- Start: San Benigno, Genoa
- End: Foce, Genoa

Operation
- Work began: 2023
- Traffic: Automotive

Technical
- Length: 4.2 km (2.6 mi)
- No. of lanes: 4
- Operating speed: 70 km/h (43 mph)

The Genoa Subport Tunnel (Italian: Tunnel subportuale di Genova) is an underground road crossing infrastructure project currently under construction in Genoa, Italy. It is designed to directly connect the San Benigno interchange to the west with the Foce district to the east, running beneath the Port of Genoa. The project aims to improve urban traffic conditions and east–west connectivity across the city, reducing surface-level traffic and promoting the urban regeneration of its waterfront.

The overall infrastructure alignment is approximately 4.2 km (2.6 mi) long, of which 3.4 km (2.1 mi) consist of two twin subsea tunnels, each with two traffic lanes. The tunnels, mechanically excavated using a large-diameter tunnel boring machine (approximately 16 m), will reach a maximum depth of about 45 m (148 ft) below sea level.

At the time of its design, it was expected to be Italy's first subsea tunnel, the largest in Europe and the fourth largest in the world by diameter.

The project, with an estimated total cost of around one billion euros, originates from an agreement between Autostrade per l'Italia, the Italian Ministry of Transport, and local authorities as compensation to the city following the collapse of Ponte Morandi in 2018. Opening to traffic is scheduled for 2029.
