= Grossa =

Commune in Corsica, France

- Commune
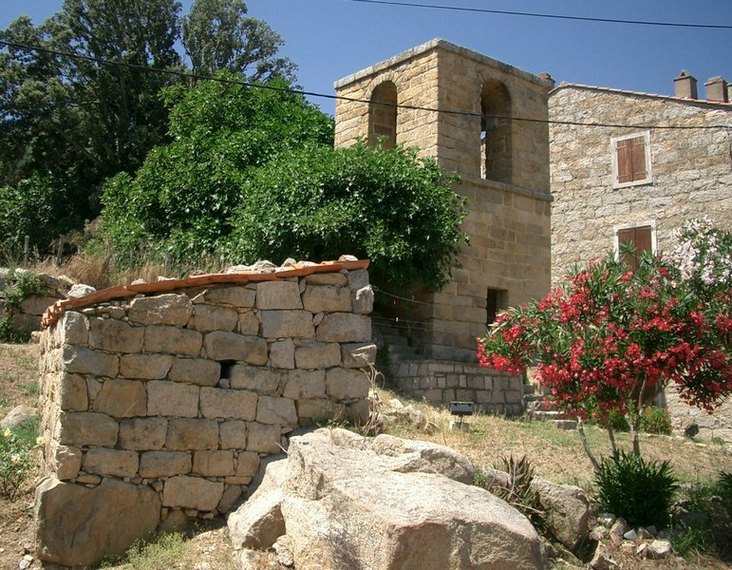
- The bell tower of the village of Grossa

- Coat of arms
- Location of Grossa
- Location within France Location within Corsica
- Coordinates: 41°36′38″N 8°52′41″E
- Country: France
- Region: Corsica
- Department: Corse-du-Sud
- Arrondissement: Sartène
- Canton: Sartenais-Valinco

Government
  - Mayor (2020–2026): Mathias Costanzo
- Area^{1}: 18.36 km^{2} (7.09 sq mi)
- Elevation: 325 m (1,066 ft)
- Highest elevation: 566 m (1,857 ft)
- Lowest elevation: 66 m (217 ft)
- Population (2023): 74
  - Density: 4.0/km^{2} (10/sq mi)
- Time zone: UTC+01:00 (CET)
  - Summer (DST): UTC+02:00 (CEST)
- INSEE/Postal code: 2A129 /20100
- ^{1} French Land Register data, which excludes lakes, ponds, glaciers > 1 km^{2} (0.386 sq mi or 247 acres) and river estuaries.

Grossa (French pronunciation: [ɡʁosa]; Corsican: A Grossa) is a commune in the Corse-du-Sud department of France on the island of Corsica.

== Population ==
Historical population
| Year | Pop. | ±% p.a. |
|---|---|---|
| 1968 | 78 | — |
| 1975 | 72 | −1.14% |
| 1982 | 58 | −3.04% |
| 1990 | 44 | −3.39% |
| 1999 | 38 | −1.62% |
| 2007 | 53 | +4.25% |
| 2012 | 42 | −4.55% |
| 2017 | 43 | +0.47% |
| 2023 | 74 | +9.47% |
Source: INSEE

== See also ==
- Communes of the Corse-du-Sud department
- Bizzicu Rossu
