= Granace =

Commune in Corsica, France

- Commune
- Location of Granace
- Location within France Location within Corsica
- Coordinates: 41°38′52″N 9°00′28″E
- Country: France
- Region: Corsica
- Department: Corse-du-Sud
- Arrondissement: Sartène
- Canton: Sartenais-Valinco

Government
  - Mayor (2020–2026): Jean-Yves Leandri
- Area^{1}: 4.08 km^{2} (1.58 sq mi)
- Elevation: 300 m (980 ft)
- Highest elevation: 601 m (1,972 ft)
- Lowest elevation: 100 m (330 ft)
- Population (2023): 92
  - Density: 23/km^{2} (58/sq mi)
- Time zone: UTC+01:00 (CET)
  - Summer (DST): UTC+02:00 (CEST)
- INSEE/Postal code: 2A128 /20100
- ^{1} French Land Register data, which excludes lakes, ponds, glaciers > 1 km^{2} (0.386 sq mi or 247 acres) and river estuaries.

Granace is a commune in the Corse-du-Sud department of France on the island of Corsica.

== Population ==
Historical population
Year	Pop.	±% p.a.
1968	93	—
1975	72	−3.59%
1982	107	+5.82%
1990	82	−3.27%
1999	61	−3.23%
2007	58	−0.63%
2012	58	+0.00%
2017	90	+9.18%
2023	92	+0.37%
Source: INSEE

== See also ==
- Communes of the Corse-du-Sud department
