= Sainte-Lucie-de-Tallano =

Commune in Corsica, France

- Commune
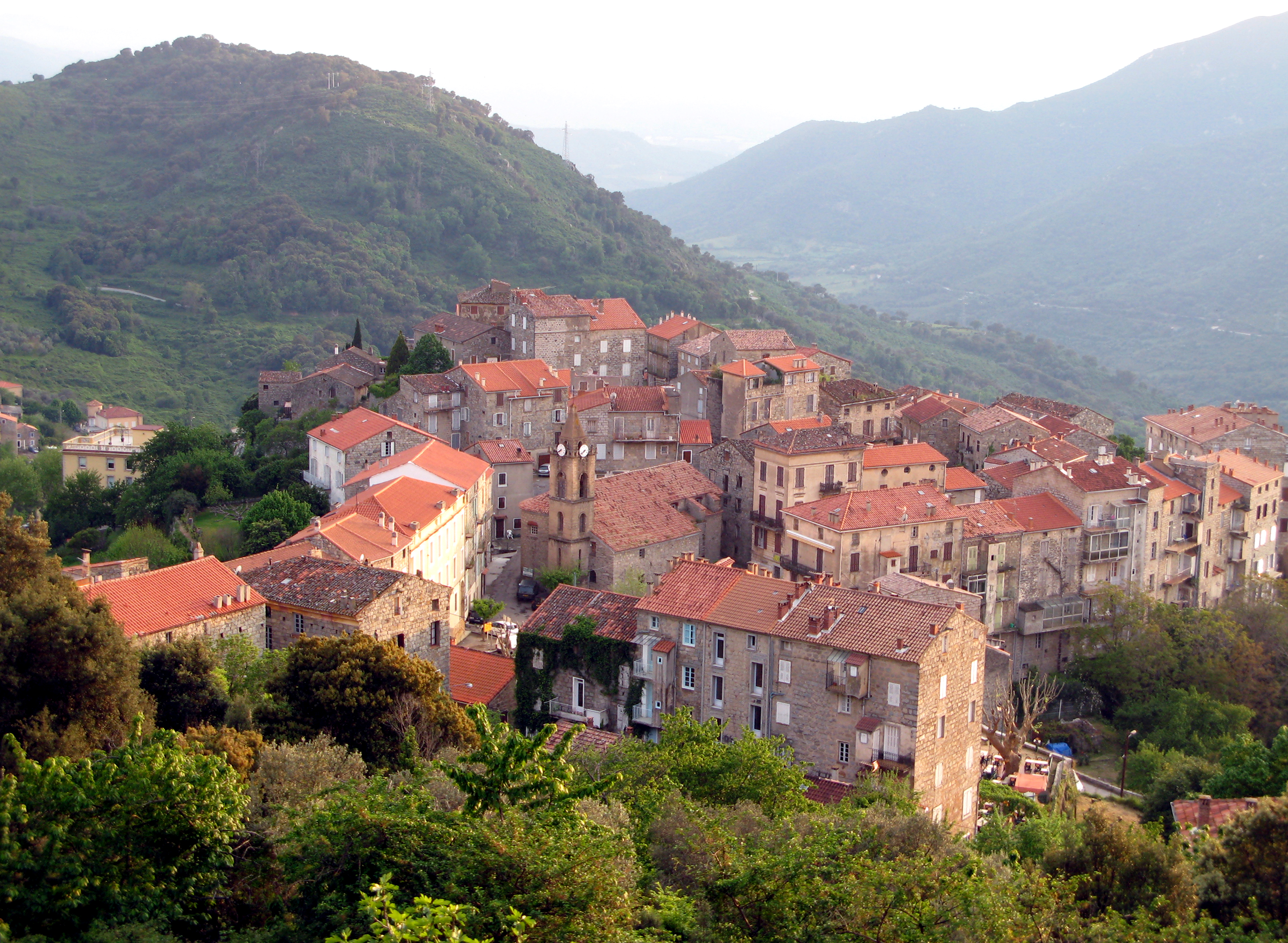
- A general view of Sainte-Lucie-de-Tallano
- Location of Sainte-Lucie-de-Tallano
- Location within France Location within Corsica
- Coordinates: 41°41′55″N 9°03′53″E
- Country: France
- Region: Corsica
- Department: Corse-du-Sud
- Arrondissement: Sartène
- Canton: Sartenais-Valinco
- Intercommunality: l'Alta Rocca

Government
  - Mayor (2020–2026): Jules Bartoli
- Area^{1}: 25.57 km^{2} (9.87 sq mi)
- Elevation: 450 m (1,480 ft)
- Highest elevation: 844 m (2,769 ft)
- Lowest elevation: 60 m (200 ft)
- Population (2023): 363
  - Density: 14.2/km^{2} (36.8/sq mi)
- Time zone: UTC+01:00 (CET)
  - Summer (DST): UTC+02:00 (CEST)
- INSEE/Postal code: 2A308 /20112
- ^{1} French Land Register data, which excludes lakes, ponds, glaciers > 1 km^{2} (0.386 sq mi or 247 acres) and river estuaries.

Sainte-Lucie-de-Tallano (French pronunciation: [sɛ̃t lysi də talano]; Italian: Santa Lucia di Tallano; Corsican: Santa Lucìa d'Attallà) is a commune in the Corse-du-Sud department of France on the island of Corsica.

== Population ==
Historical population
Year	Pop.	±% p.a.
1968	626	—
1975	513	−2.80%
1982	362	−4.86%
1990	424	+2.00%
1999	392	−0.87%
2007	363	−0.96%
2012	446	+4.20%
2017	424	−1.01%
2023	363	−2.56%
Source: INSEE

== Gallery ==
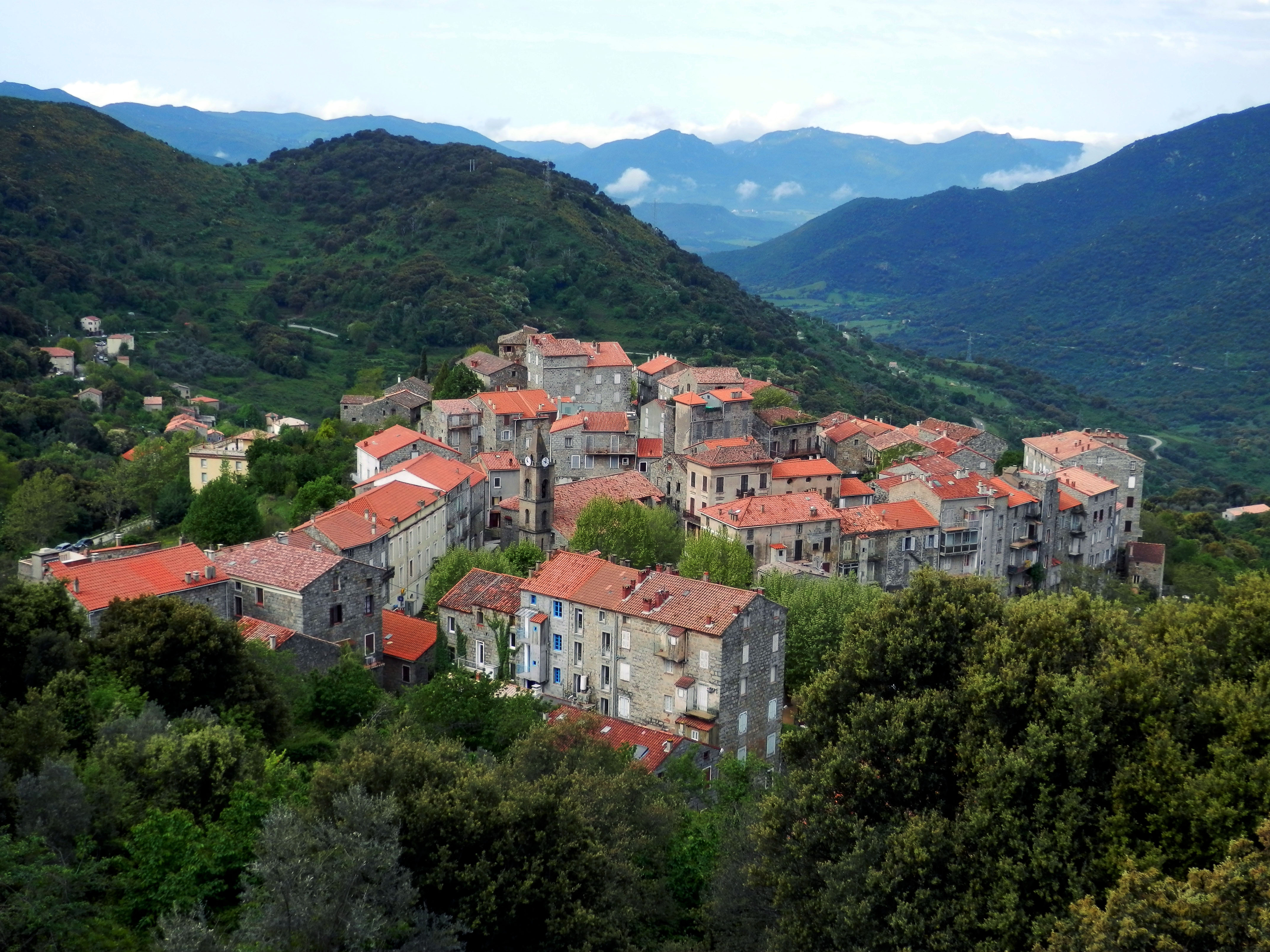
Panoramic view

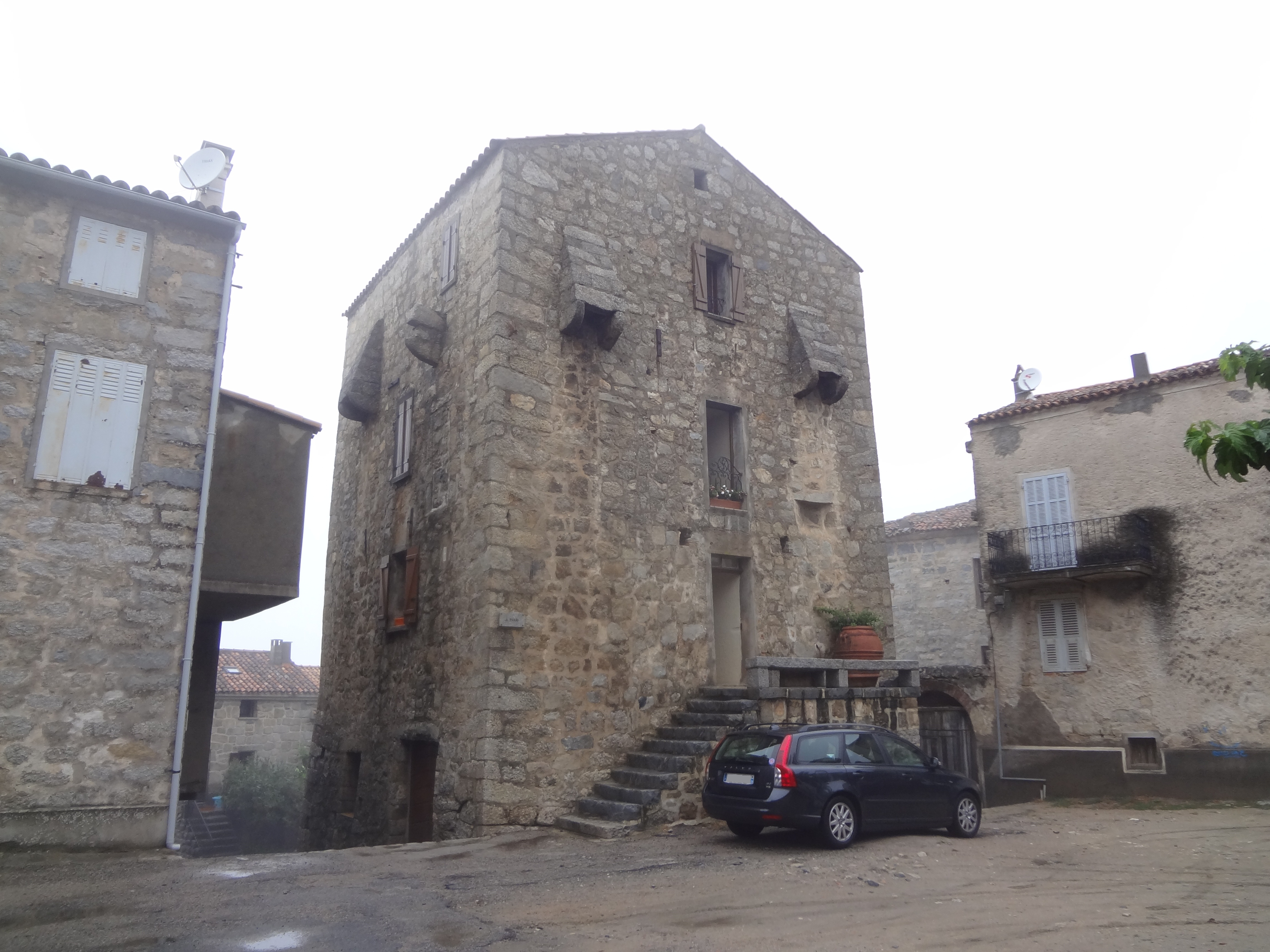
Maison Giacomoni

== See also ==
- Communes of the Corse-du-Sud department
