= Bilia =

Commune in Corsica, France

- Commune
- Location of Bilia
- Location within France Location within Corsica
- Coordinates: 41°37′33″N 8°54′28″E
- Country: France
- Region: Corsica
- Department: Corse-du-Sud
- Arrondissement: Sartène
- Canton: Sartenais-Valinco

Government
  - Mayor (2020–2026): Michel Tramoni
- Area^{1}: 7.43 km^{2} (2.87 sq mi)
- Elevation: 400 m (1,300 ft)
- Highest elevation: 609 m (1,998 ft)
- Lowest elevation: 153 m (502 ft)
- Population (2023): 54
  - Density: 7.3/km^{2} (19/sq mi)
- Time zone: UTC+01:00 (CET)
  - Summer (DST): UTC+02:00 (CEST)
- INSEE/Postal code: 2A038 /20100
- ^{1} French Land Register data, which excludes lakes, ponds, glaciers > 1 km^{2} (0.386 sq mi or 247 acres) and river estuaries.

Bilia (French pronunciation: [bilja]) is a commune in the Corse-du-Sud department of France, on the island of Corsica, within its Corsican single territorial collectivity. It is part of the microregion of Bisogène, the south-western part of the Corsican region of Rocca.

== Politics and administration ==
Jean François Quilichini was mayor of Bilia from 1989 to March 2008, whereupon he was replaced by Michel Tramoni. Both mayors are affiliated to the French Communist Party.

== Population ==
Historical population

| Year | Pop. | ±% p.a. |
|---|---|---|
| 1806 | 153 | — |
| 1821 | 215 | +2.29% |
| 1846 | 234 | +0.34% |
| 1872 | 257 | +0.36% |
| 1901 | 252 | −0.07% |
| 1926 | 321 | +0.97% |
| 1946 | 173 | −3.04% |
| 1954 | 72 | −10.38% |
| 1962 | 45 | −5.71% |

| Year | Pop. | ±% p.a. |
|---|---|---|
| 1968 | 58 | +4.32% |
| 1975 | 40 | −5.17% |
| 1982 | 38 | −0.73% |
| 1990 | 41 | +0.95% |
| 1999 | 40 | −0.27% |
| 2007 | 49 | +2.57% |
| 2012 | 48 | −0.41% |
| 2017 | 46 | −0.85% |
| 2023 | 54 | +2.71% |

Source: EHESS and INSEE

== See also ==
- Communes of the Corse-du-Sud department
