= Olmiccia =

Commune in Corsica, France

- Commune
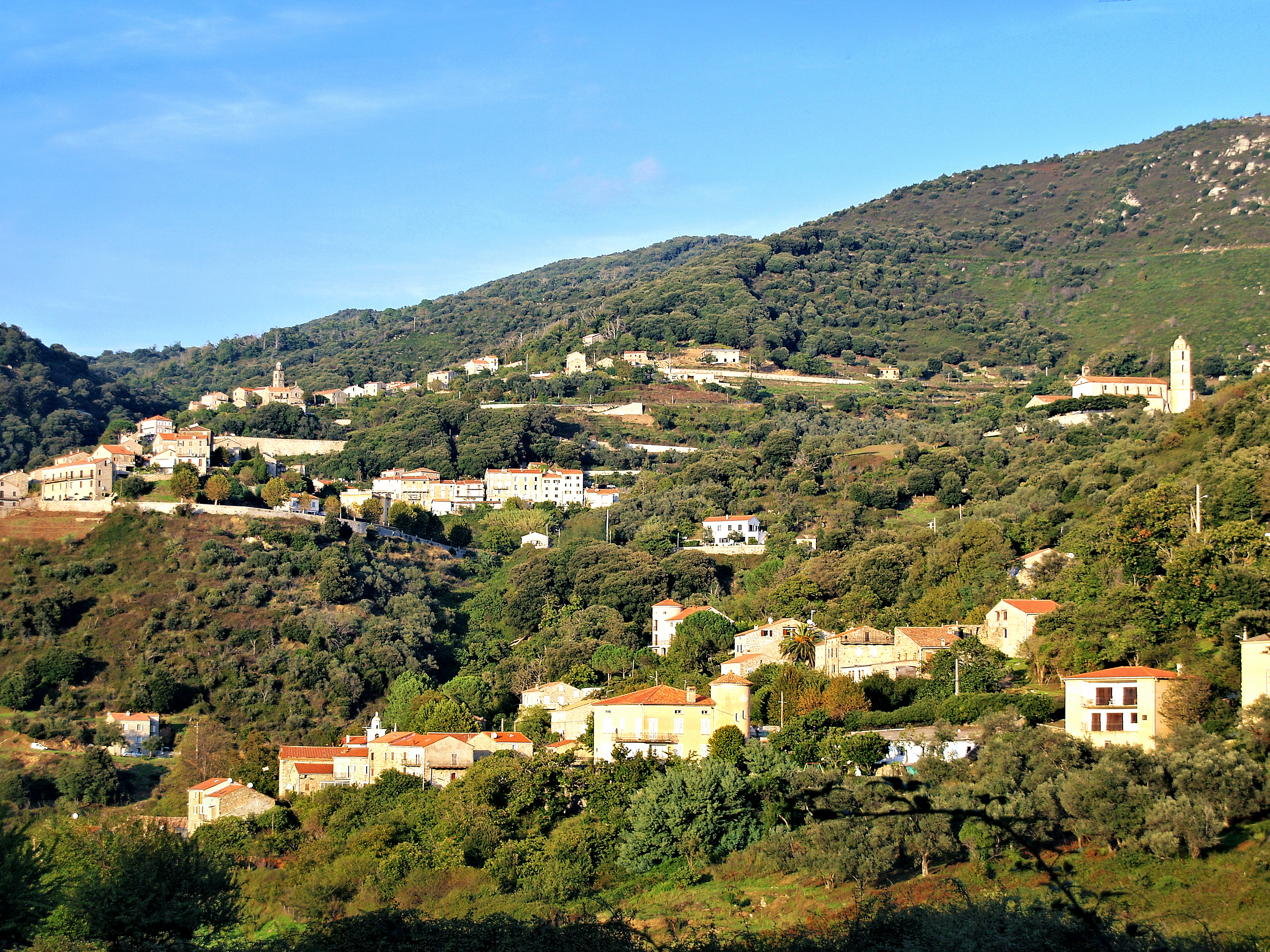
- Olmiccia and Santa Lucie de Tallano
- Location of Olmiccia
- Location within France Location within Corsica
- Coordinates: 41°41′39″N 9°03′38″E
- Country: France
- Region: Corsica
- Department: Corse-du-Sud
- Arrondissement: Sartène
- Canton: Sartenais-Valinco
- Intercommunality: l'Alta Rocca

Government
  - Mayor (2020–2026): Roméo Joseph Antoine Adorni
- Area^{1}: 11.22 km^{2} (4.33 sq mi)
- Elevation: 400 m (1,300 ft)
- Highest elevation: 560 m (1,840 ft)
- Lowest elevation: 38 m (125 ft)
- Population (2023): 120
  - Density: 11/km^{2} (28/sq mi)
- Time zone: UTC+01:00 (CET)
  - Summer (DST): UTC+02:00 (CEST)
- INSEE/Postal code: 2A191 /20112
- ^{1} French Land Register data, which excludes lakes, ponds, glaciers > 1 km^{2} (0.386 sq mi or 247 acres) and river estuaries.

Olmiccia is a commune in the Corse-du-Sud department of France on the island of Corsica.

== Population ==
Historical population
Year	Pop.	±% p.a.
1968	71	—
1975	73	+0.40%
1982	94	+3.68%
1990	84	−1.40%
1999	82	−0.27%
2007	100	+2.51%
2012	112	+2.29%
2017	122	+1.73%
2023	120	−0.28%
Source: INSEE

== See also ==
- Communes of the Corse-du-Sud department
