= Canton of Sartenais-Valinco =

Coordinates: 41.67°N 8.90°E

The canton of Sartenais-Valinco is an administrative division of the Corse-du-Sud department, southeastern France. It was created at the French canton reorganisation which came into effect in March 2015. Its seat is in Propriano.

It consists of the following communes:

1. Altagène
2. Arbellara
3. Aullène
4. Belvédère-Campomoro
5. Bilia
6. Cargiaca
7. Foce
8. Fozzano
9. Giuncheto
10. Granace
11. Grossa
12. Loreto-di-Tallano
13. Mela
14. Olmeto
15. Olmiccia
16. Propriano
17. Quenza
18. Sainte-Lucie-de-Tallano
19. Santa-Maria-Figaniella
20. Sartène
21. Serra-di-Scopamène
22. Sorbollano
23. Viggianello
24. Zérubia
25. Zoza
