= Giuncheto =

Commune in Corsica, France

- Commune
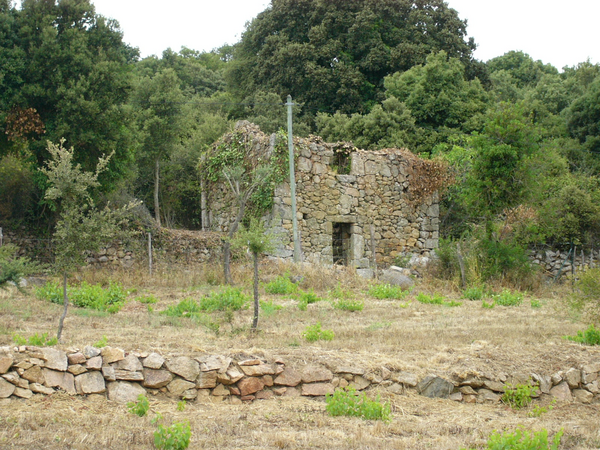
- The U Troghju Comunu, which is the ancestor of the wine cooperatives, in Giuncheto
- Location of Giuncheto
- Location within France Location within Corsica
- Coordinates: 41°35′16″N 8°57′17″E
- Country: France
- Region: Corsica
- Department: Corse-du-Sud
- Arrondissement: Sartène
- Canton: Sartenais-Valinco

Government
  - Mayor (2020–2026): François Paolini
- Area^{1}: 7.61 km^{2} (2.94 sq mi)
- Elevation: 350 m (1,150 ft)
- Highest elevation: 609 m (1,998 ft)
- Lowest elevation: 120 m (390 ft)
- Population (2023): 106
  - Density: 13.9/km^{2} (36.1/sq mi)
- Time zone: UTC+01:00 (CET)
  - Summer (DST): UTC+02:00 (CEST)
- INSEE/Postal code: 2A127 /20100
- ^{1} French Land Register data, which excludes lakes, ponds, glaciers > 1 km^{2} (0.386 sq mi or 247 acres) and river estuaries.

Giuncheto is a commune in the Corse-du-Sud department of France on the island of Corsica.

== Population ==
Historical population
Year	Pop.	±% p.a.
1968	77	—
1975	53	−5.20%
1982	41	−3.60%
1990	46	+1.45%
1999	69	+4.61%
2007	89	+3.23%
2012	80	−2.11%
2017	86	+1.46%
2023	106	+3.55%
Source: INSEE

== See also ==
- Communes of the Corse-du-Sud department
