= Quenza =

Commune in Corsica, France

- Commune
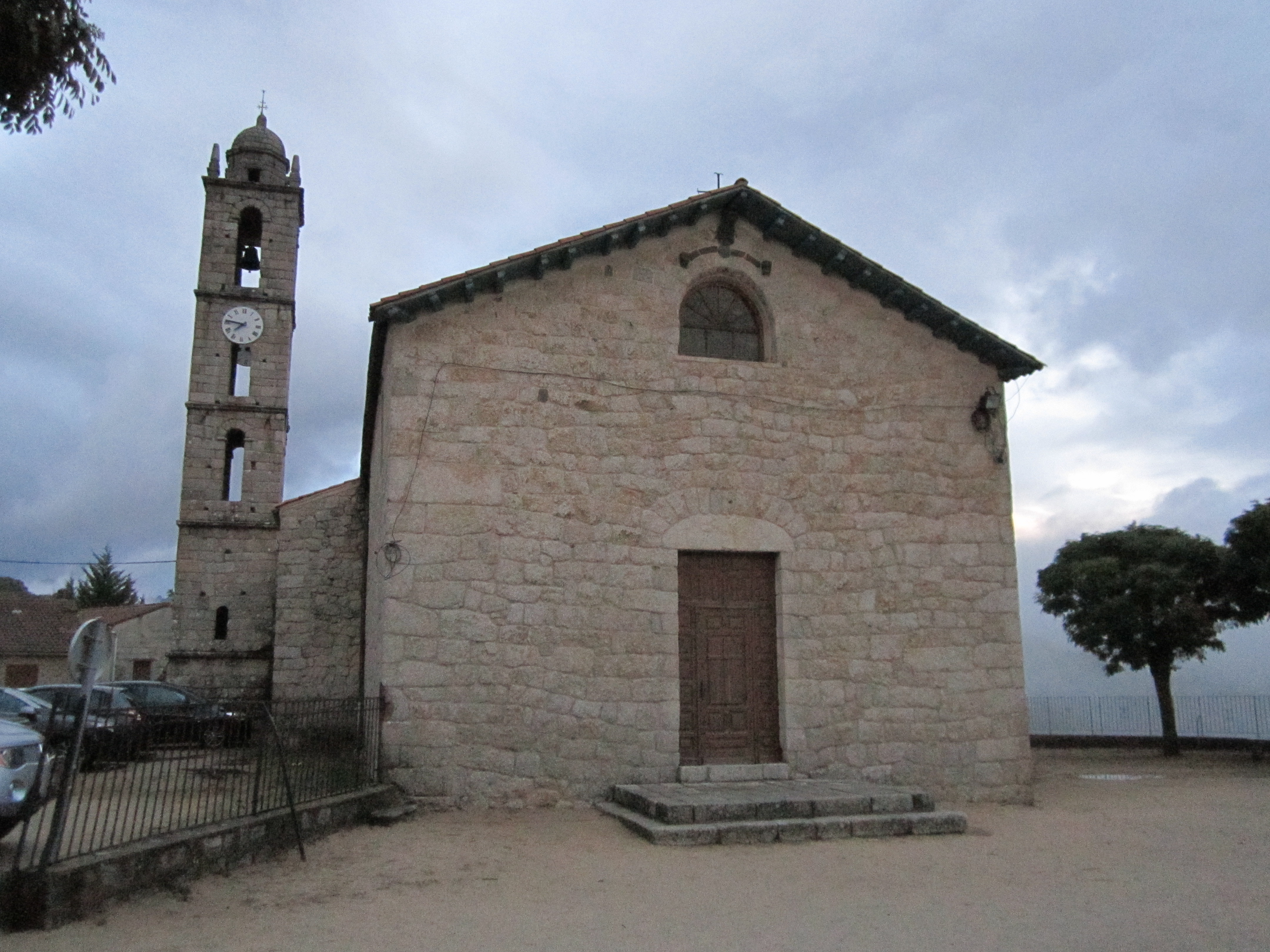
- The church of Saint-Georges, in Quenza
- Location of Quenza
- Location within France Location within Corsica
- Coordinates: 41°46′00″N 9°08′22″E
- Country: France
- Region: Corsica
- Department: Corse-du-Sud
- Arrondissement: Sartène
- Canton: Sartenais-Valinco
- Intercommunality: l'Alta Rocca

Government
  - Mayor (2020–2026): Roselyne Balesi
- Area^{1}: 95.67 km^{2} (36.94 sq mi)
- Elevation: 805 m (2,641 ft)
- Highest elevation: 2,134 m (7,001 ft)
- Lowest elevation: 134 m (440 ft)
- Population (2023): 200
  - Density: 2.1/km^{2} (5.4/sq mi)
- Time zone: UTC+01:00 (CET)
  - Summer (DST): UTC+02:00 (CEST)
- INSEE/Postal code: 2A254 /20122
- ^{1} French Land Register data, which excludes lakes, ponds, glaciers > 1 km^{2} (0.386 sq mi or 247 acres) and river estuaries.

Quenza (Corsican pronunciation: [ˈkwɛnt͡sa], French: [kwɛntsa]) is a commune in the department of Corse-du-Sud, island and collectivity of Corsica, France.

== Geography ==
=== Climate ===
Quenza has a hot-summer Mediterranean climate (Köppen climate classification Csa) closely bordering on a warm-summer Mediterranean climate (Csb). The average annual temperature in Quenza is 12.9 °C (55.2 °F). The average annual rainfall is 1,395.1 mm (54.93 in) with November as the wettest month. The temperatures are highest on average in August, at around 22.3 °C (72.1 °F), and lowest in January, at around 5.2 °C (41.4 °F). The highest temperature ever recorded in Quenza was 38.0 °C (100.4 °F) on 3 August 2017; the coldest temperature ever recorded was −7.3 °C (18.9 °F) on 7 February 2012.

Climate data for Quenza (1991−2020 normals, extremes 2009−present)
Month	Jan	Feb	Mar	Apr	May	Jun	Jul	Aug	Sep	Oct	Nov	Dec	Year
Record high °C (°F)	18.9 (66.0)	21.1 (70.0)	22.4 (72.3)	28.0 (82.4)	30.7 (87.3)	36.5 (97.7)	37.8 (100.0)	38.0 (100.4)	33.0 (91.4)	28.4 (83.1)	23.9 (75.0)	20.6 (69.1)	38.0 (100.4)
Mean daily maximum °C (°F)	8.9 (48.0)	9.5 (49.1)	12.2 (54.0)	16.2 (61.2)	19.2 (66.6)	24.1 (75.4)	27.7 (81.9)	28.5 (83.3)	23.2 (73.8)	18.9 (66.0)	13.5 (56.3)	10.2 (50.4)	17.7 (63.9)
Daily mean °C (°F)	5.2 (41.4)	5.4 (41.7)	7.7 (45.9)	11.3 (52.3)	14.1 (57.4)	18.5 (65.3)	21.7 (71.1)	22.3 (72.1)	17.8 (64.0)	14.1 (57.4)	9.6 (49.3)	6.5 (43.7)	12.9 (55.2)
Mean daily minimum °C (°F)	1.6 (34.9)	1.3 (34.3)	3.2 (37.8)	6.4 (43.5)	9.0 (48.2)	13.0 (55.4)	15.7 (60.3)	16.1 (61.0)	12.4 (54.3)	9.3 (48.7)	5.7 (42.3)	2.7 (36.9)	8.0 (46.4)
Record low °C (°F)	−5.7 (21.7)	−7.3 (18.9)	−4.7 (23.5)	−4.5 (23.9)	0.7 (33.3)	4.7 (40.5)	8.7 (47.7)	7.7 (45.9)	4.6 (40.3)	−0.2 (31.6)	−3.4 (25.9)	−6.6 (20.1)	−7.3 (18.9)
Average precipitation mm (inches)	157.8 (6.21)	153.4 (6.04)	139.2 (5.48)	79.3 (3.12)	92.1 (3.63)	65.0 (2.56)	37.3 (1.47)	26.1 (1.03)	79.2 (3.12)	123.0 (4.84)	245.9 (9.68)	196.8 (7.75)	1,395.1 (54.93)
Average precipitation days (≥ 1.0 mm)	12.3	10.6	10.6	8.8	8.6	6.1	3.1	2.3	6.0	8.3	12.3	11.5	100.4
Source: Météo-France

== Population ==
Historical population
Year	Pop.	±% p.a.
1968	307	—
1975	302	−0.23%
1982	229	−3.88%
1990	214	−0.84%
1999	215	+0.05%
2007	235	+1.12%
2012	206	−2.60%
2017	190	−1.60%
2023	200	+0.86%
Source: INSEE

== See also ==
- Communes of the Corse-du-Sud department
- Aiguilles de Bavella
