= Bizzicu Rossu =

Archaeological site in Corsica, France

Coordinates: 41.60075°N 8.87884°E

Bizzicu Rossu is an archaeological site in Corsica.

It is located in the commune of Grossa.
