= Mela, Corse-du-Sud =

Commune in Corsica, France

Mela
- Commune
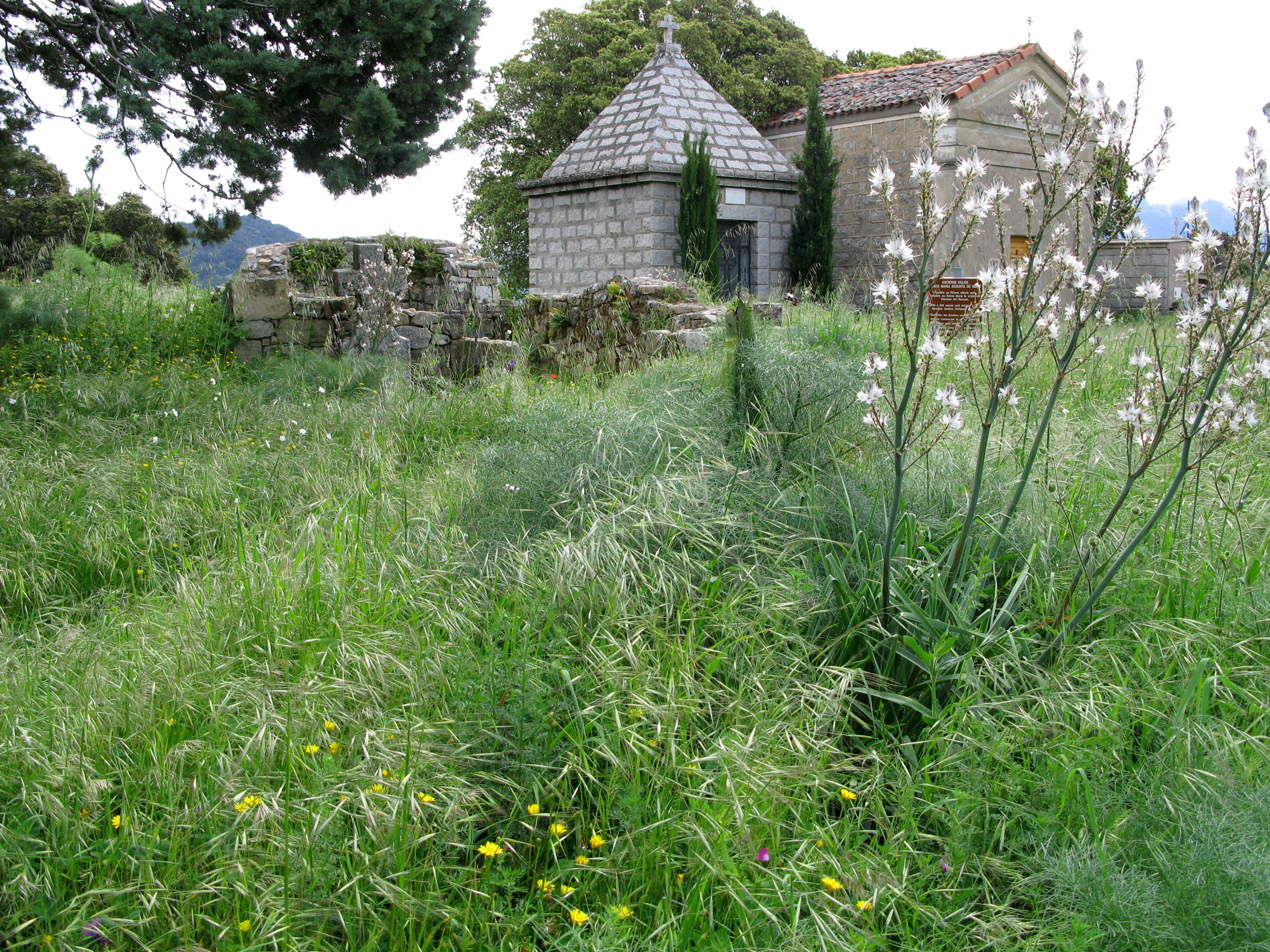
- Ruins of the church of Santa Maria Assunta
- Location of Mela
- Location within France Location within Corsica
- Coordinates: 41°41′48″N 9°05′41″E
- Country: France
- Region: Corsica
- Department: Corse-du-Sud
- Arrondissement: Sartène
- Canton: Sartenais-Valinco
- Intercommunality: l'Alta Rocca

Government
  - Mayor (2020–2026): Albert Mondoloni
- Area^{1}: 4.63 km^{2} (1.79 sq mi)
- Elevation: 800 m (2,600 ft)
- Highest elevation: 908 m (2,979 ft)
- Lowest elevation: 137 m (449 ft)
- Population (2023): 37
  - Density: 8.0/km^{2} (21/sq mi)
- Time zone: UTC+01:00 (CET)
  - Summer (DST): UTC+02:00 (CEST)
- INSEE/Postal code: 2A158 /20112
- ^{1} French Land Register data, which excludes lakes, ponds, glaciers > 1 km^{2} (0.386 sq mi or 247 acres) and river estuaries.

Mela is a commune in the Corse-du-Sud department of France on the island of Corsica.

== Population ==
Historical population
Year	Pop.	±% p.a.
1968	56	—
1975	51	−1.33%
1982	48	−0.86%
1990	30	−5.71%
1999	40	+3.25%
2007	32	−2.75%
2012	31	−0.63%
2017	29	−1.32%
2023	37	+4.14%
Source: INSEE

== See also ==
- Communes of the Corse-du-Sud department
