= Santa-Maria-Figaniella =

Commune in Corsica, France

- Commune
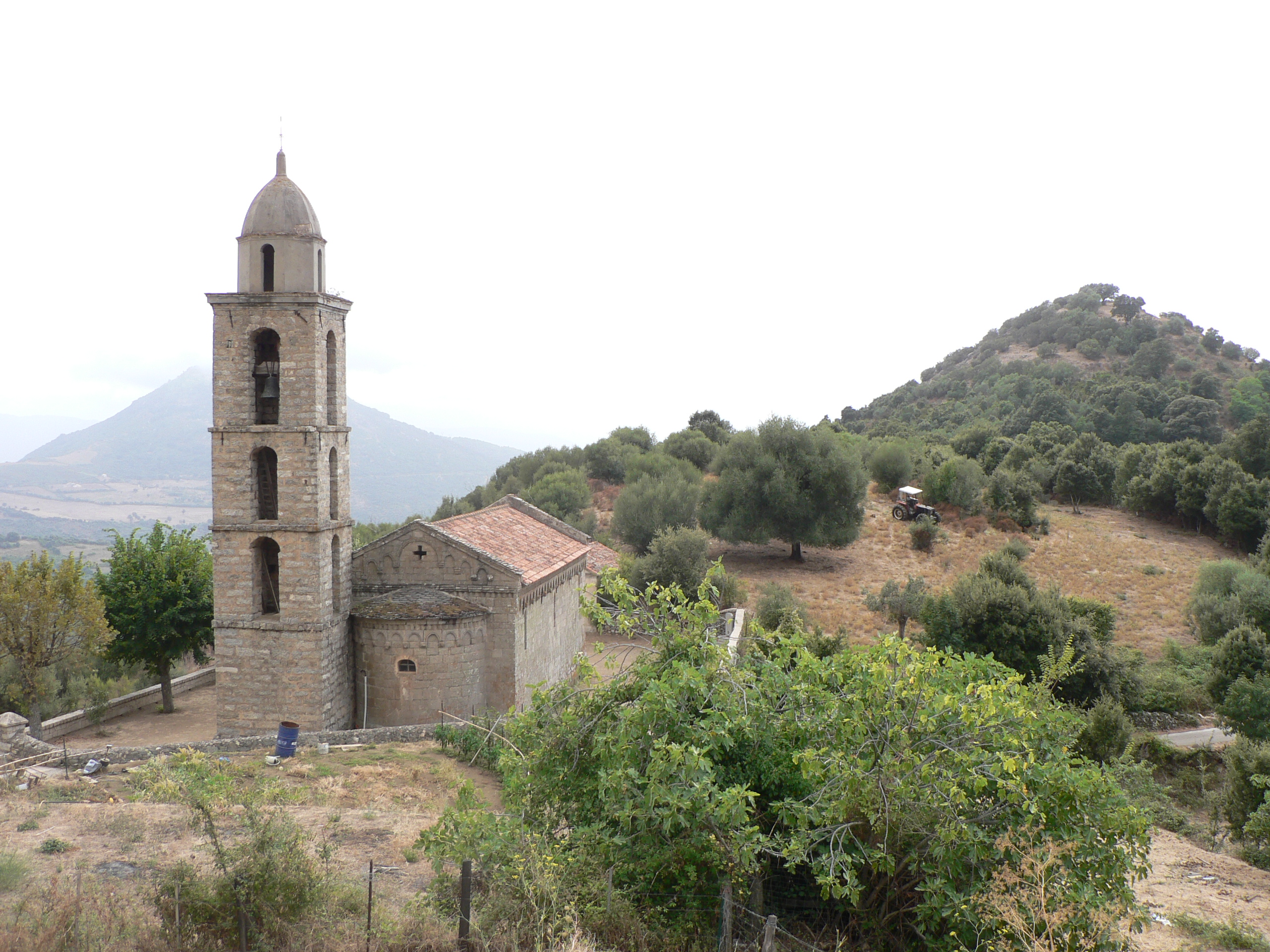
- The church of Santa-Maria-Figaniella
- Location of Santa-Maria-Figaniella
- Location within France Location within Corsica
- Coordinates: 41°42′29″N 9°00′20″E
- Country: France
- Region: Corsica
- Department: Corse-du-Sud
- Arrondissement: Sartène
- Canton: Sartenais-Valinco

Government
  - Mayor (2020–2026): Dominique Antoine Rocca
- Area^{1}: 13.09 km^{2} (5.05 sq mi)
- Elevation: 452 m (1,483 ft)
- Highest elevation: 1,005 m (3,297 ft)
- Lowest elevation: 99 m (325 ft)
- Population (2023): 74
  - Density: 5.7/km^{2} (15/sq mi)
- Time zone: UTC+01:00 (CET)
  - Summer (DST): UTC+02:00 (CEST)
- INSEE/Postal code: 2A310 /20143
- ^{1} French Land Register data, which excludes lakes, ponds, glaciers > 1 km^{2} (0.386 sq mi or 247 acres) and river estuaries.

Santa-Maria-Figaniella is a commune in the Corse-du-Sud department of France on the island of Corsica.

== Population ==
Historical population
Year	Pop.	±% p.a.
1968	110	—
1975	89	−2.98%
1982	70	−3.37%
1990	58	−2.32%
1999	72	+2.43%
2007	82	+1.64%
2012	80	−0.49%
2017	100	+4.56%
2023	74	−4.89%
Source: INSEE

== See also ==
- Communes of the Corse-du-Sud department
