= Foce =

Commune in Corsica, France

- Commune
- Location of Foce
- Location within France Location within Corsica
- Coordinates: 41°37′54″N 9°03′51″E
- Country: France
- Region: Corsica
- Department: Corse-du-Sud
- Arrondissement: Sartène
- Canton: Sartenais-Valinco

Government
  - Mayor (2020–2026): Pierre Cianfarani
- Area^{1}: 20.75 km^{2} (8.01 sq mi)
- Elevation: 622 m (2,041 ft)
- Highest elevation: 691 m (2,267 ft)
- Lowest elevation: 97 m (318 ft)
- Population (2023): 151
  - Density: 7.28/km^{2} (18.8/sq mi)
- Time zone: UTC+01:00 (CET)
  - Summer (DST): UTC+02:00 (CEST)
- INSEE/Postal code: 2A115 /20100
- ^{1} French Land Register data, which excludes lakes, ponds, glaciers > 1 km^{2} (0.386 sq mi or 247 acres) and river estuaries.

Foce is a commune in the Corse-du-Sud department of France on the island of Corsica.

== Population ==
Historical population
| Year | Pop. | ±% p.a. |
|---|---|---|
| 1968 | 51 | — |
| 1975 | 60 | +2.35% |
| 1982 | 82 | +4.56% |
| 1990 | 94 | +1.72% |
| 1999 | 110 | +1.76% |
| 2007 | 132 | +2.31% |
| 2012 | 144 | +1.76% |
| 2017 | 152 | +1.09% |
| 2023 | 151 | −0.11% |
Source: INSEE

== See also ==
- Communes of the Corse-du-Sud department
