= Viggianello, Corse-du-Sud =

Commune in Corsica, France

Viggianello
- Commune
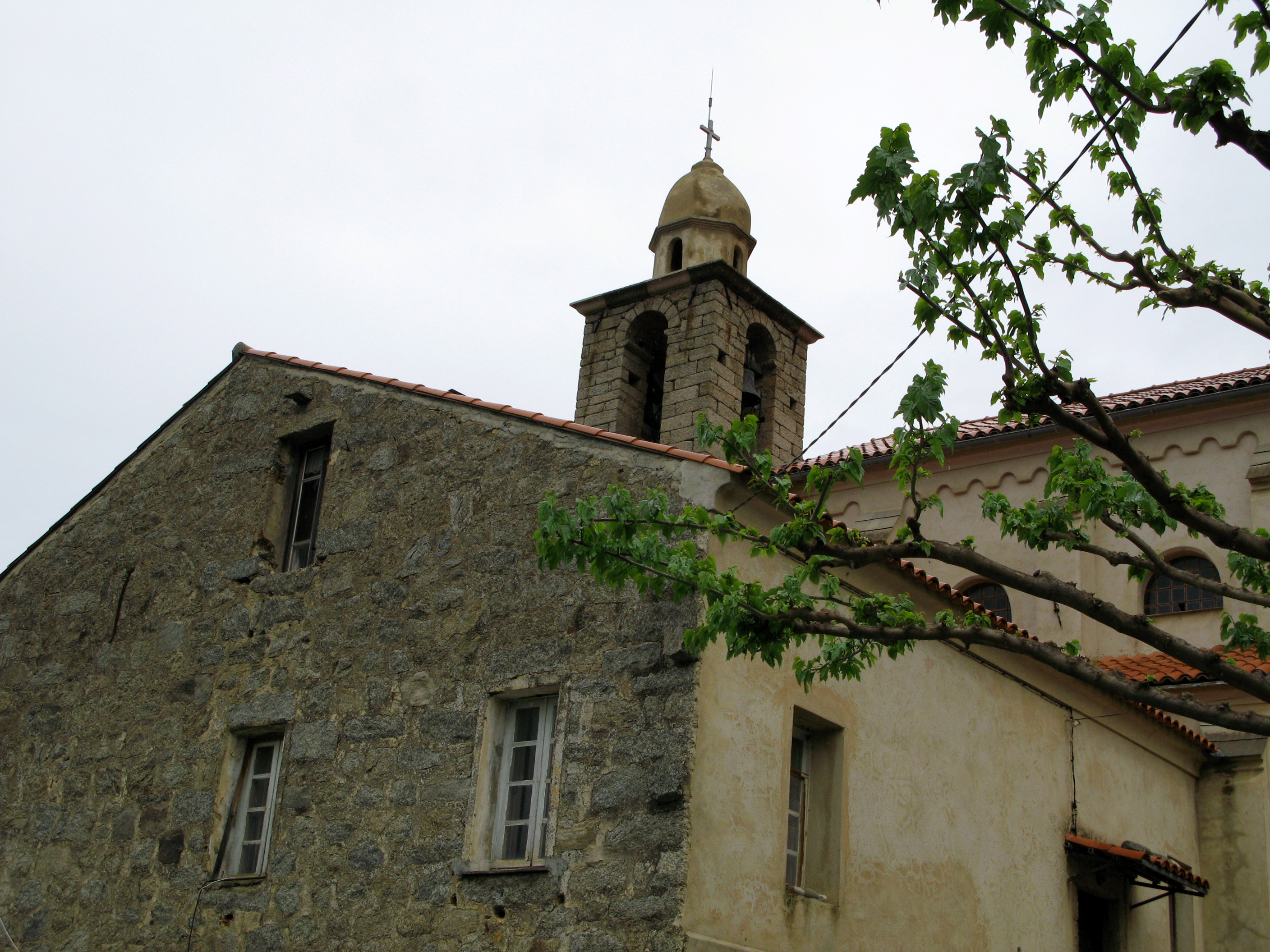
- The bell tower of the church in Viggianello
- Location of Viggianello
- Location within France Location within Corsica
- Coordinates: 41°40′54″N 8°57′09″E
- Country: France
- Region: Corsica
- Department: Corse-du-Sud
- Arrondissement: Sartène
- Canton: Sartenais-Valinco

Government
  - Mayor (2020–2026): Joseph Pucci
- Area^{1}: 17.03 km^{2} (6.58 sq mi)
- Elevation: 312 m (1,024 ft)
- Highest elevation: 668 m (2,192 ft)
- Lowest elevation: 5 m (16 ft)
- Population (2023): 908
  - Density: 53.3/km^{2} (138/sq mi)
- Time zone: UTC+01:00 (CET)
  - Summer (DST): UTC+02:00 (CEST)
- INSEE/Postal code: 2A349 /20110
- ^{1} French Land Register data, which excludes lakes, ponds, glaciers > 1 km^{2} (0.386 sq mi or 247 acres) and river estuaries.

Viggianello (French pronunciation: [vidʒanɛlo]; Corsican: Vighjaneddu) is a commune in the Corse-du-Sud department of France on the island of Corsica.

== Location ==
Viggianello is in the western plain to the east of the coastal town of Propriano. It lies between the Baraci river to the north and the Rizzanese river to the south. The 665 metres (2,182 ft) Punta Savaziglia is on the eastern border of the commune.

== Population ==
Historical population
Year	Pop.	±% p.a.
1968	190	—
1975	239	+3.33%
1982	274	+1.97%
1990	365	+3.65%
1999	417	+1.49%
2007	565	+3.87%
2012	685	+3.93%
2017	814	+3.51%
2023	908	+1.84%
Source: INSEE

== See also ==
- Communes of the Corse-du-Sud department
