= Zérubia =

Commune in Corsica, France

- Commune
- Location of Zérubia
- Location within France Location within Corsica
- Coordinates: 41°45′12″N 9°04′34″E
- Country: France
- Region: Corsica
- Department: Corse-du-Sud
- Arrondissement: Sartène
- Canton: Sartenais-Valinco
- Intercommunality: Alta Rocca

Government
  - Mayor (2020–2026): Ribello Jean-Claude Lucchini
- Area^{1}: 13.18 km^{2} (5.09 sq mi)
- Elevation: 750 m (2,460 ft)
- Highest elevation: 1,264 m (4,147 ft)
- Lowest elevation: 274 m (899 ft)
- Population (2023): 46
  - Density: 3.5/km^{2} (9.0/sq mi)
- Time zone: UTC+01:00 (CET)
  - Summer (DST): UTC+02:00 (CEST)
- INSEE/Postal code: 2A357 /20116
- ^{1} French Land Register data, which excludes lakes, ponds, glaciers > 1 km^{2} (0.386 sq mi or 247 acres) and river estuaries.

Zérubia is a commune in the Corse-du-Sud department of France on the island of Corsica.

== Population ==
Historical population

| Year | Pop. | ±% p.a. |
|---|---|---|
| 1800 | 497 | — |
| 1806 | 405 | −3.35% |
| 1821 | 431 | +0.42% |
| 1831 | 466 | +0.78% |
| 1836 | 517 | +2.10% |
| 1841 | 529 | +0.46% |
| 1846 | 553 | +0.89% |
| 1851 | 578 | +0.89% |
| 1856 | 618 | +1.35% |
| 1861 | 670 | +1.63% |
| 1866 | 212 | −20.56% |
| 1872 | 237 | +1.88% |
| 1876 | 240 | +0.31% |
| 1881 | 234 | −0.51% |
| 1886 | 225 | −0.78% |
| 1891 | 160 | −6.59% |
| 1896 | 137 | −3.06% |
| 1901 | 198 | +7.64% |

| Year | Pop. | ±% p.a. |
|---|---|---|
| 1906 | 182 | −1.67% |
| 1911 | 180 | −0.22% |
| 1921 | 98 | −5.90% |
| 1926 | 112 | +2.71% |
| 1931 | 132 | +3.34% |
| 1936 | 150 | +2.59% |
| 1946 | 63 | −8.31% |
| 1954 | 82 | +3.35% |
| 1962 | 60 | −3.83% |
| 1968 | 50 | −2.99% |
| 1975 | 40 | −3.14% |
| 1982 | 27 | −5.46% |
| 1990 | 34 | +2.92% |
| 1999 | 29 | −1.75% |
| 2007 | 28 | −0.44% |
| 2012 | 31 | +2.06% |
| 2017 | 43 | +6.76% |
| 2023 | 46 | +1.13% |

Source: EHESS (1793-1999) and INSEE

== See also ==
- Communes of the Corse-du-Sud department
- Tour de Corse
