= Loreto-di-Tallano =

Commune in Corsica, France

- Commune
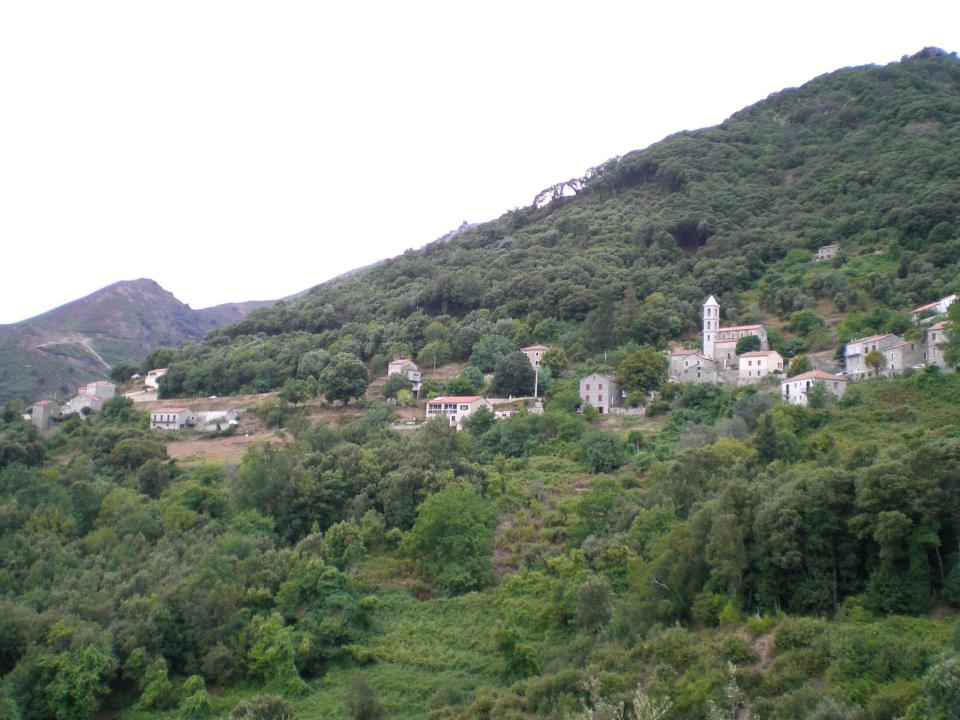
- A view of the village of Loreto-di-Tallano
- Location of Loreto-di-Tallano
- Location within France Location within Corsica
- Coordinates: 41°43′15″N 9°02′15″E
- Country: France
- Region: Corsica
- Department: Corse-du-Sud
- Arrondissement: Sartène
- Canton: Sartenais-Valinco
- Intercommunality: l'Alta Rocca

Government
  - Mayor (2020–2026): Jean-Pierre Arrii
- Area^{1}: 6.93 km^{2} (2.68 sq mi)
- Elevation: 140 m (460 ft)
- Highest elevation: 900 m (3,000 ft)
- Lowest elevation: 59 m (194 ft)
- Population (2023): 47
  - Density: 6.8/km^{2} (18/sq mi)
- Time zone: UTC+01:00 (CET)
  - Summer (DST): UTC+02:00 (CEST)
- INSEE/Postal code: 2A146 /20165
- ^{1} French Land Register data, which excludes lakes, ponds, glaciers > 1 km^{2} (0.386 sq mi or 247 acres) and river estuaries.

Loreto-di-Tallano is a commune in the Corse-du-Sud department of France on the island of Corsica.

== Population ==
Historical population
Year	Pop.	±% p.a.
1968	101	—
1975	94	−1.02%
1982	70	−4.12%
1990	57	−2.54%
1999	35	−5.27%
2007	46	+3.48%
2012	50	+1.68%
2017	53	+1.17%
2023	47	−1.98%
Source: INSEE

== Places ==
Saint-Pierre Church

== See also ==
- Communes of the Corse-du-Sud department
