= Olivese =

Commune in Corsica, France

- Commune
- Location of Olivese
- Location within France Location within Corsica
- Coordinates: 41°50′47″N 9°03′27″E
- Country: France
- Region: Corsica
- Department: Corse-du-Sud
- Arrondissement: Ajaccio
- Canton: Taravo-Ornano

Government
  - Mayor (2020–2026): Jean-Luc Millo
- Area^{1}: 29.64 km^{2} (11.44 sq mi)
- Elevation: 492 m (1,614 ft)
- Highest elevation: 1,680 m (5,510 ft)
- Lowest elevation: 260 m (850 ft)
- Population (2023): 221
  - Density: 7.46/km^{2} (19.3/sq mi)
- Time zone: UTC+01:00 (CET)
  - Summer (DST): UTC+02:00 (CEST)
- INSEE/Postal code: 2A186 /20140
- ^{1} French Land Register data, which excludes lakes, ponds, glaciers > 1 km^{2} (0.386 sq mi or 247 acres) and river estuaries.

Olivese (Corsican: Livesi) is a commune in the Corse-du-Sud department of France on the island of Corsica.

== Population ==
Historical population
Year	Pop.	±% p.a.
1968	363	—
1975	300	−2.69%
1982	319	+0.88%
1990	283	−1.49%
1999	282	−0.04%
2007	266	−0.73%
2012	237	−2.28%
2017	226	−0.95%
2023	221	−0.37%
Source: INSEE

== See also ==
- Communes of the Corse-du-Sud department
