= Propriano =

Commune in Corsica, France

- Commune
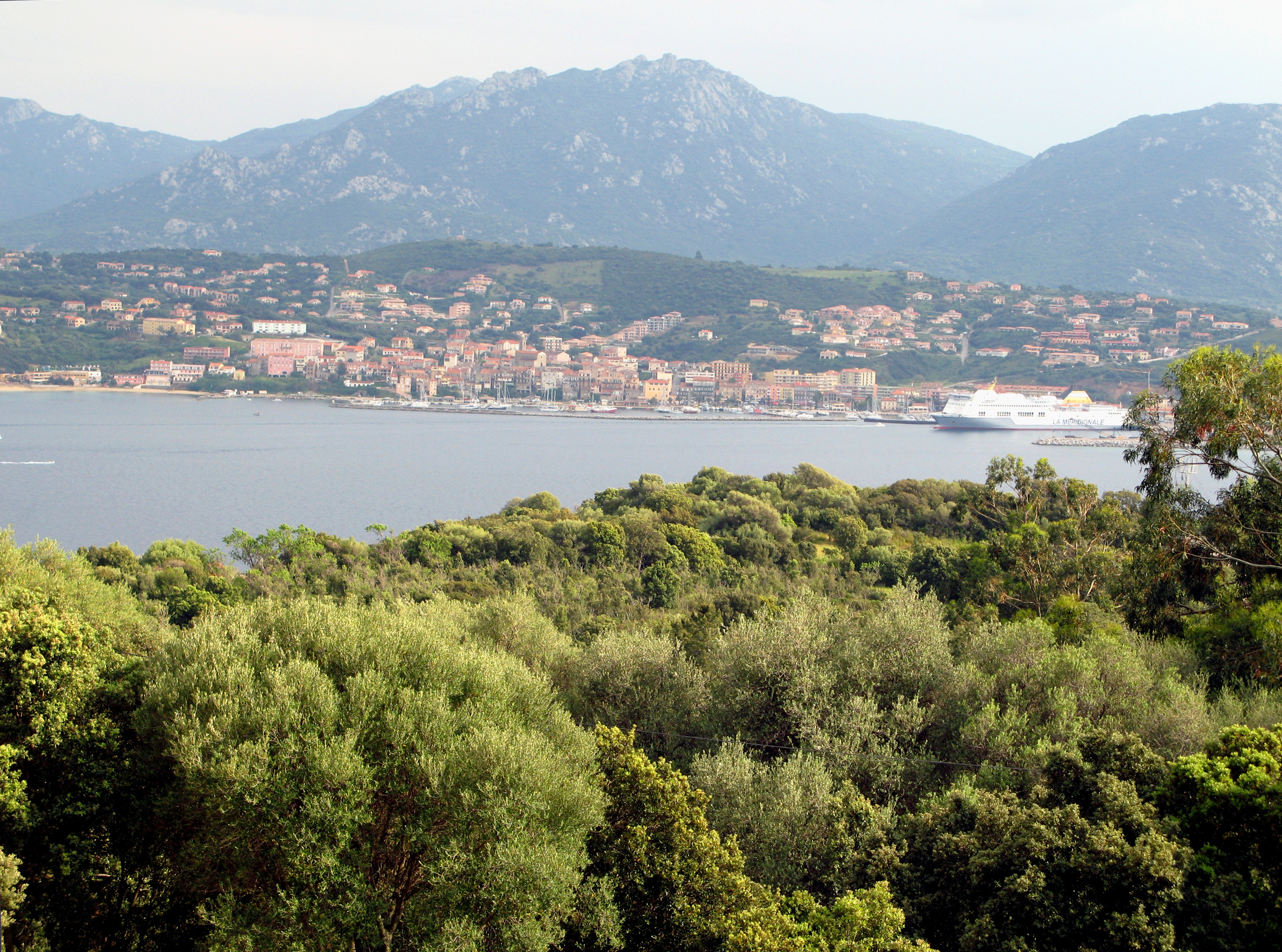
- A view from the north, from the RN196 road, from Olmeto

- Coat of arms
- Location of Propriano
- Location within France Location within Corsica
- Coordinates: 41°40′34″N 8°54′18″E
- Country: France
- Region: Corsica
- Department: Corse-du-Sud
- Arrondissement: Sartène
- Canton: Sartenais-Valinco

Government
  - Mayor (2020–2026): Paul-Marie Bartoli
- Area^{1}: 18.73 km^{2} (7.23 sq mi)
- Elevation: 12 m (39 ft)
- Highest elevation: 609 m (1,998 ft)
- Lowest elevation: 0 m (0 ft)
- Population (2023): 3,996
  - Density: 213.3/km^{2} (552.6/sq mi)
- Time zone: UTC+01:00 (CET)
  - Summer (DST): UTC+02:00 (CEST)
- INSEE/Postal code: 2A249 /20110
- ^{1} French Land Register data, which excludes lakes, ponds, glaciers > 1 km^{2} (0.386 sq mi or 247 acres) and river estuaries.

Propriano (French pronunciation: [pʁɔpʁijano]; Corsican: Prupià, Pruprià) is a commune in the Corse-du-Sud department of France on the island of Corsica.

It is situated on the Valinco Gulf.

== Population ==
Historical population
Year	Pop.	±% p.a.
1968	1,846	—
1975	2,950	+6.93%
1982	3,098	+0.70%
1990	3,217	+0.47%
1999	3,166	−0.18%
2007	3,243	+0.30%
2012	3,622	+2.24%
2017	3,747	+0.68%
2023	3,996	+1.08%
Source: INSEE

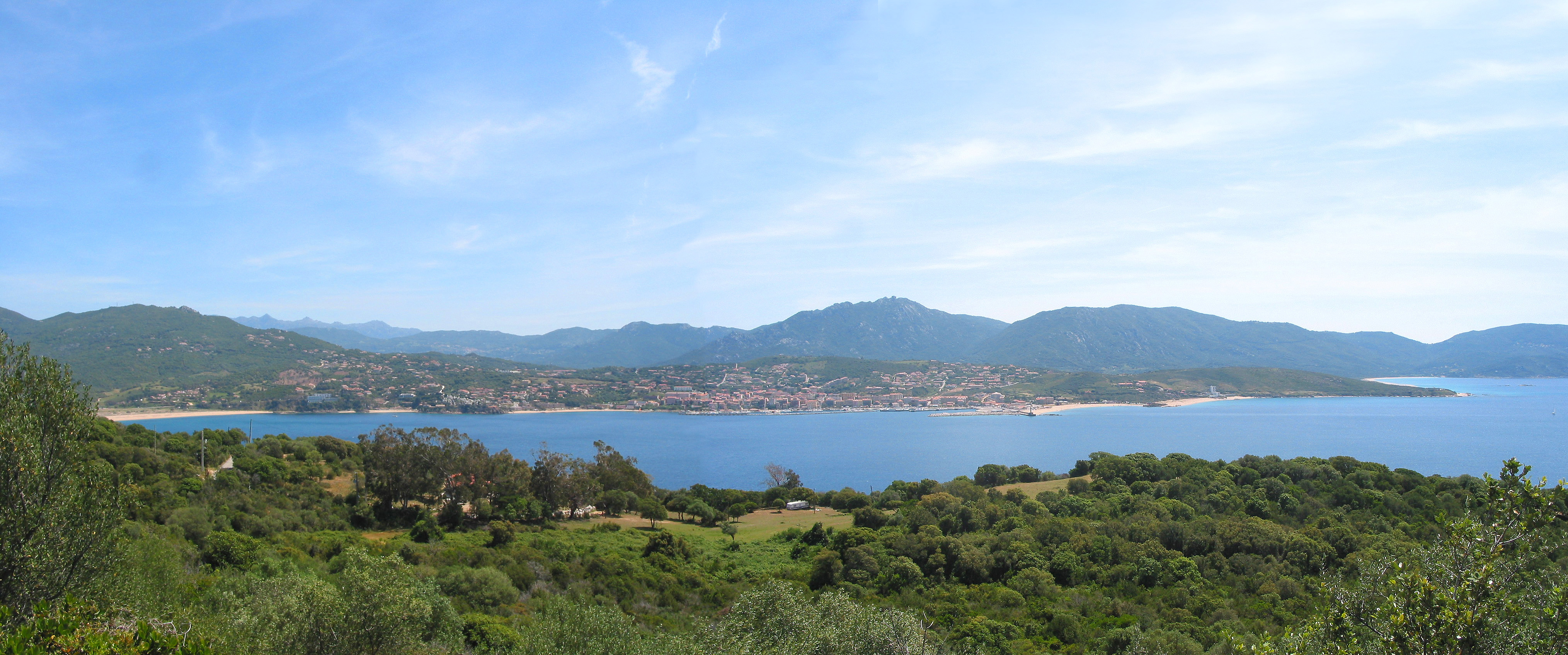
Propriano Gulf and the city

== Transport ==
- Railway stations in Corsica – stillborn branch

== See also ==
- Communes of the Corse-du-Sud department
