= Fozzano =

Commune in Corsica, France

- Commune
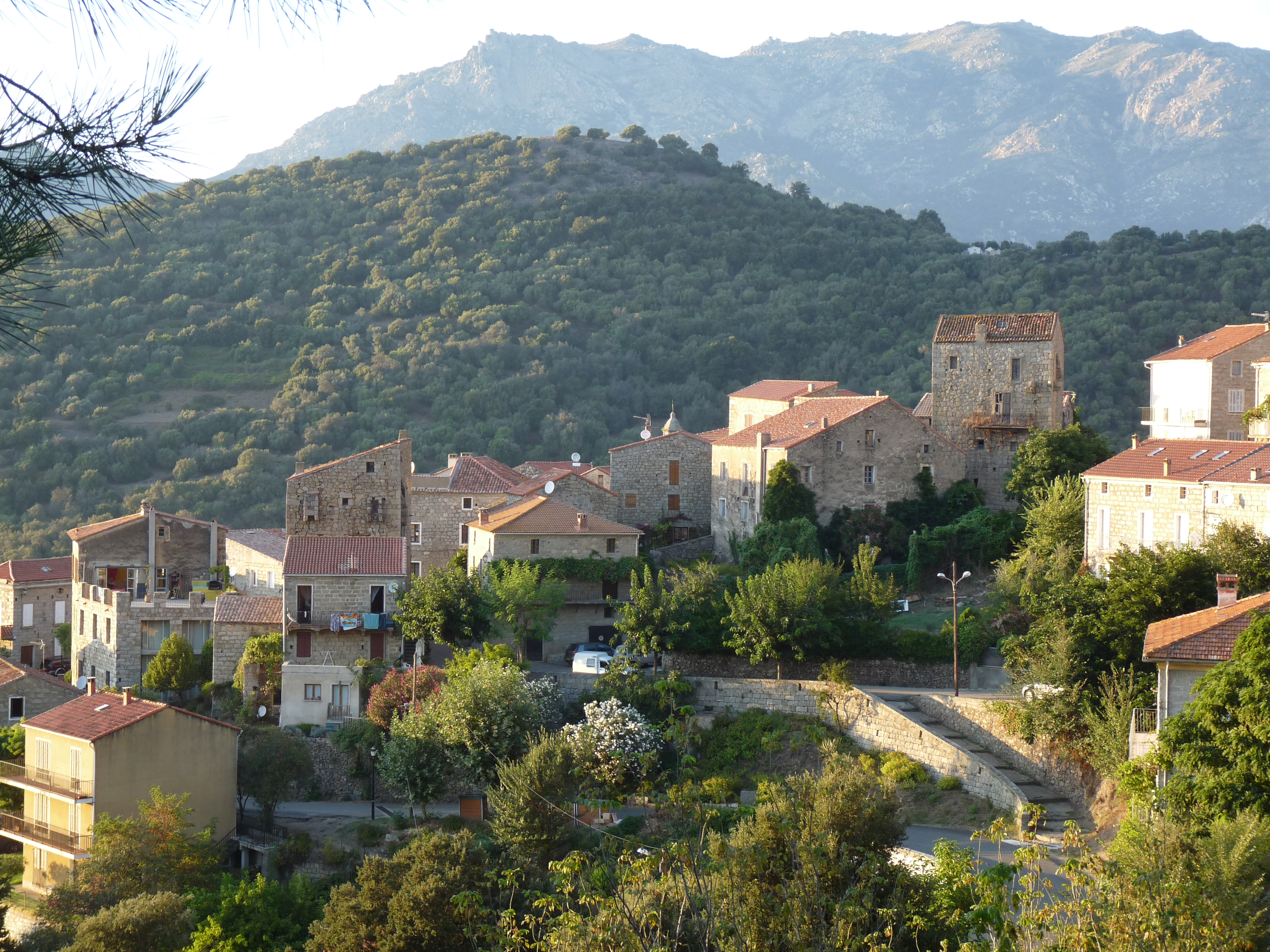
- The towers of the two rival families in Fozzano, named Carabelli (Tower of Colomba) and Durazzo
- Location of Fozzano
- Location within France Location within Corsica
- Coordinates: 41°41′55″N 9°00′04″E
- Country: France
- Region: Corsica
- Department: Corse-du-Sud
- Arrondissement: Sartène
- Canton: Sartenais-Valinco

Government
  - Mayor (2020–2026): Mireille Istria
- Area^{1}: 19.59 km^{2} (7.56 sq mi)
- Elevation: 350 m (1,150 ft)
- Highest elevation: 953 m (3,127 ft)
- Lowest elevation: 15 m (49 ft)
- Population (2023): 210
  - Density: 11/km^{2} (28/sq mi)
- Time zone: UTC+01:00 (CET)
  - Summer (DST): UTC+02:00 (CEST)
- INSEE/Postal code: 2A118 /20143
- ^{1} French Land Register data, which excludes lakes, ponds, glaciers > 1 km^{2} (0.386 sq mi or 247 acres) and river estuaries.

Fozzano (French pronunciation: [fotsano]; Corsican: Fuzzà) is a commune in the Corse-du-Sud department of France on the island of Corsica.

== Population ==
Historical population
Year	Pop.	±% p.a.
1968	150	—
1975	174	+2.14%
1982	182	+0.64%
1990	152	−2.23%
1999	195	+2.81%
2007	192	−0.19%
2012	197	+0.52%
2017	209	+1.19%
2023	210	+0.08%
Source: INSEE

== See also ==
- Communes of the Corse-du-Sud department
