= Prehistory of Corsica =

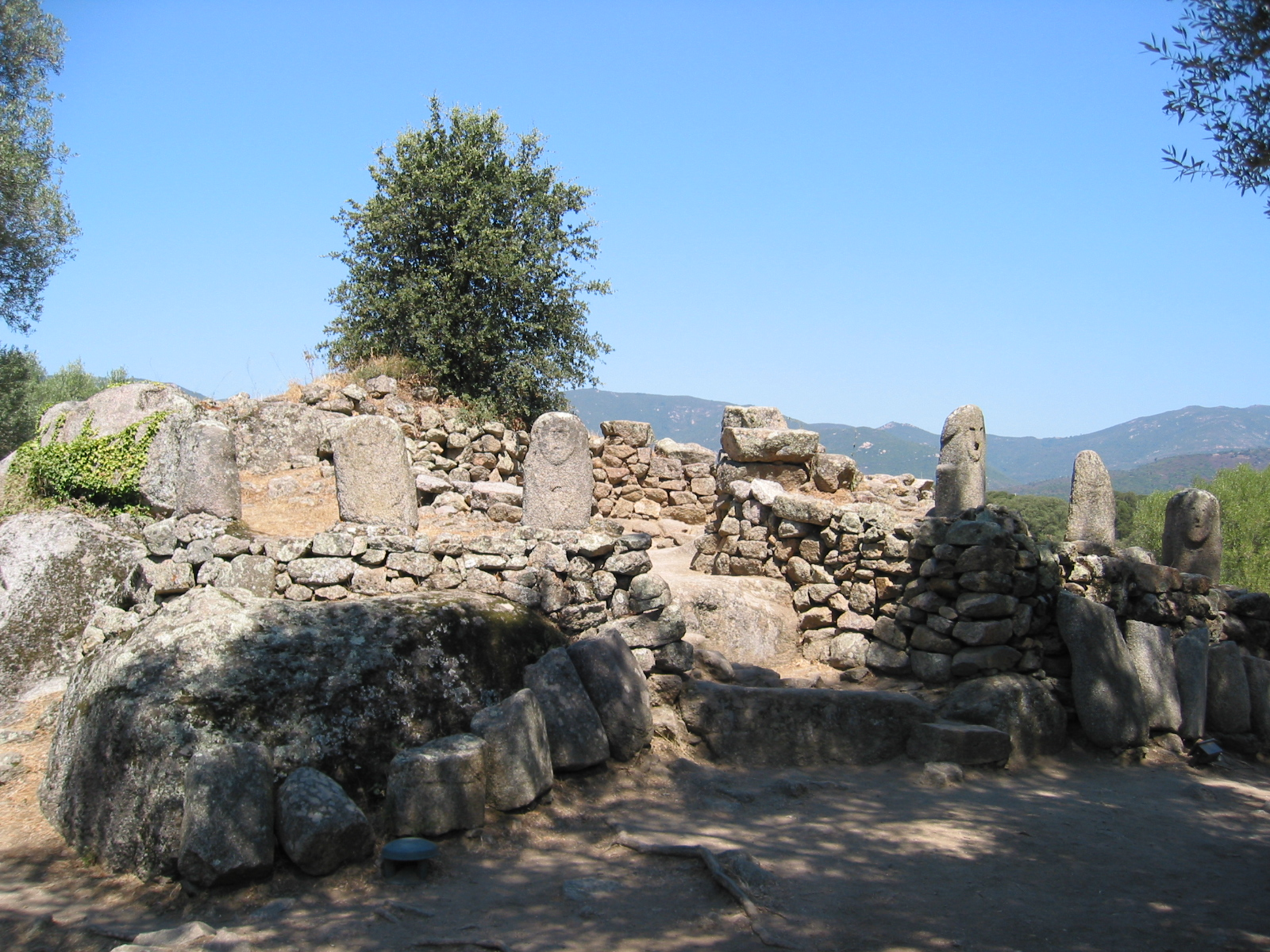
Prehistoric structures at Filitosa

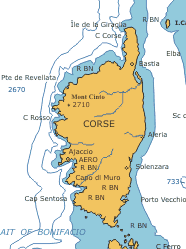
Corsica showing the maritime substructure. Sardinia is immediately to the south. During low sea levels in early post-glacial times the blue was connected land mass.

The prehistory of Corsica is analogous to the prehistories of the other islands in the Mediterranean Sea, such as Sicily, Sardinia, Malta and Cyprus, which could only be accessed by boat and featured cultures that were to some degree insular; that is, modified from the traditional Paleolithic, Mesolithic, Neolithic and Chalcolithic of European prehistoric cultures. The islands of the Aegean Sea and Crete early developed Bronze Age civilizations and are accordingly usually treated under those categories. Stone Age Crete however shares some of the features of the prehistoric Mediterranean islands.

The possible presence of Upper Paleolithic people on Corsica during the last glacial period is a topic of interest to professional and amateur prehistorians alike. Currently only one possible site of this period is known. For most of the Paleolithic, Corsica, Sardinia, and all the islands between them were physically continuous with the Italian peninsula, although they have been islands at various times both before and after in geologic history.

The insular prehistory of Corsica begins with the Mesolithic (Pre-Neolithic) when people from prehistoric Sardinia crossed the Strait of Bonifacio to hunt from rock shelters in Corsica at approximately 9000 BC. It ends with colonization by the Ancient Greeks at Aléria in 566 BC, the Iron Age. Corsica, or Kyrnos, is not mentioned before then. Thus the history of Corsica begins in 566 BC.

== Flandrian transgression ==
The name given to the rise in sea level after the last glaciation is the Flandrian transgression. It has been fairly well chronicled by core sample data and turned into graphic form (see article). During the last glaciation, Corsica and Sardinia were connected and joined to Tuscany through the Tuscan Archipelago. The Corsican land mass was larger by a significant shelf now drowned.

Utilizing an average depth of 70 metres (230 ft) for the Strait of Bonifacio, the sea level would have been at that point at approximately 12,000 BP, roughly 10,000 BC. As it is unthinkable that Paleolithic cultures would not have spread over the entire shelf and the finger-bone of 20,000 BP from Sardinia gives certain evidence of Palaeolithic human presence there, the most logical conclusion (reached by nearly all the prehistorians) concerning the deficit of Palaeolithic artifacts is that the sites where they would have been found have not been discovered yet. One reason for their invisibility is that they have been drowned.

Mesolithic sites are for the most part confined to the lowlands of Corsica, which form a shelf around the mountains, of little interest to primitive agriculturalists and difficult to hunt. Before the transgression another shelf still lower must have provided easy access to the Palaeolithics. According to current evidence the Mesolithic was entirely within the island phase, requiring the Mesolithics to travel by boat. No such requirement existed for any possible Palaeolithics; consequently, arguments based on the maritime travel capabilities of Palaeolithcs are not relevant in this case.

== Genetic demographics ==
A 2004 genetic study by Tofanelli and others of eight autosomal locations on the DNA in the blood cells of 179 blood donors from Corsica compared genetic distance between alleles (variants at those locations) in an attempt to determine "homogeneity" or closeness of kinship and "heterogeneity" within this sample of the Corsican population and also between this and other samples elsewhere. Analysis of variance was the chief statistical method applied to the data.

For Corte, which is inland Corsica, the investigators use the term stochastic (random), finding a higher variability among Corsicans than within the rest of the Mediterranean reference population. There was also a gap between Corse-du-Sud and Haute-Corse. Using an assumed generation of 25 years, the investigators estimate a base population at 20,000 years ago for the first humans of Corsica. As this number is in no way supported by archaeological evidence, it suggests that cultural remains of the Paleolithic may well yet turn up.

The greatest genetic distances were between the Sardinian and Corsican populations, which indicates that the islands were settled by different people. The investigators exclude any significant gene flow between the two islands. The closest affinities were with the population of Tuscany. The investigators attribute this closer kinship to a major influx from there in the early and middle Neolithic, which they date to the 8th-6th millennia BC. Subsequently, they postulate a population expansion in the Chalcolithic, which is substantiated by the distribution of Corsican artifacts throughout the Mediterranean. The separation of Corsican and non-Corsican populations falls within rather wide limits: no earlier than 19,000 BC or later than 3000 BC at latest, according to Tofanelli.

A study in 2002 by Vona and others of 19 genetic markers, 54 alleles, on 1,164 persons reached exactly the opposite conclusion: "Corsica also appears to be greatly differentiated from the populations of regions such as France and Tuscany .... The Mediterranean population most comparable to Corsica is Sardinia." Apparently genetic studies of the Corsicans are still exploratory and are not yet reaching definitive evidence on their affinities to other populations. The two studies did draw the same conclusions about the gap between Corse-du-Sud and Haute-Corse.

== Pre-Neolithic ==
=== Terminology ===
The term "Pre-Neolithic" is used of cultural material prior to the Neolithic on the islands of the Mediterranean Sea: Corsica, Sardinia, Cyprus, the Balearic Islands, etc. Typically sites that contain layers clearly identifiable as Neolithic also include preceding layers of faunal material. Although hundreds of C-14 dates have been acquired serious questions or ambiguities concerning the nature of the material have arisen: whether it is cultural or natural and whether Paleolithic or Mesolithic; hence, Pre-Neolithic covers either case of cultural material.

For example, the most sanguine claims for Sardinia postulate "more than ten Paleolithic sites", the oldest of which are Clactonian dating to the Middle Pleistocene (300,000-200,000 BP). After a gap the Corbeddu Cave at Oliena provides Late Pleistocene material from 14,000 to 12,000 BP. However, in that cave was a human phalanx bone from 20,000 BP and skull fragments from 8750±140 BP, possibly indicating an "endemic presence of humans." The most skeptical views discount the Palaeolithic claims:

Although there have been numerous claims for Pre-Neolithic occupation of many of the Mediterranean islands, few can stand up to critical scrutiny.

The Clactonian material, in this view, comes from "disturbed contexts" or is a matter of interpretation of stones that could be natural or from some other time and the evidence of the Corbeddu Cave is "simply not very robust" due to "taphonomic questions;" i.e., questions of the dates of the fossils. More important than the ambiguity about the period to which this and other material belong is the fact that even when clearly perceived and robustly dated they may not fit the archetypical Paleolithic, Mesolithic and Neolithic. A group of intermediate terms have come into use, such as Pre-Pottery Neolithic, the Neolithic without its formerly diagnostic marker, the pottery.

The Pre-Neolithic therefore refers to a period before the Neolithic that either does not have all the characteristics of the Mesolithic or has a superset, the extraneous ones belonging to the Neolithic. For example, the Jōmon culture of Japan is called the Pre-Neolithic because of its pottery, but it did not produce food. In the same spirit the Epipaleolithic ("after the Palaeolithic") stands also where the Mesolithic should be.

The Mediterranean Pre-Neolithic culture lacks the microliths and fine flakes characteristic of the continental Mesolithic, which may be an alteration of the Mesolithic due to insularity. Consequently, such names as "Tyrrhenian Epipalaeolithic" and "Island Mesolithic" have also been assigned. Many authors prefer the simple term Mesolithic, but the difficulty of defining it continues; for example, the famed Lady of Boniface from layer XVIIIb of Araguina-Sennola in Bonifacio, the first complete human skeleton on Corsica, has been carbon dated to 8560±150 BP or 6570±150 BC. To some she is an early Neolithic woman and to others a Pre-Neolithic one, with the Neolithic starting at either 6500 or 6000 accordingly. Dates are therefore either carbon dates or interpretational periods, which vary depending on what dates are to be included. Some sites have material from many periods, others only one.

=== Corsican Paleolithic ===
The Corsican Paleolithic occurs before 9000 BC. In the mid-1990s the first dateable site of a probable Paleolithic provenience was discovered on Corsica. Although the stone tools remain equivocal, the habitation evidence is not.

- Coscia Grotto, Rogliano

=== Corsican Mesolithic/Pre-Neolithic ===
Laurent-Jacques Costa, an expert in Corsican prehistory, dates the Corsican Mesolithic (in preference to Pre-Neolithic) to 9000-6000 BC. This period is known at several sites over all of Corsica and is parallel to a similar contemporaneous culture on Sardinia. The presence of Sardinian obsidian in southern Corsica (identified by chemical analysis) is believed to indicate that the Sardinians crossed over to Corsica, or more likely that there was an extensive international trading network that involved heavy contact between Corsica, Sardinia, the Tuscan region and Southwestern Europe.

The sites are:

- Araguina-Sennola, Bonifacio
- Basi, Serra-di-Ferro
- Curacchiaghju, Levie
- Grotto of Gritulu, Luri
- Monte Leone, Bonifacio
- Strette, Barbaggio
- Torre d'Aquila, Pietracorbara

== Neolithic ==
The Corsican Neolithic occurs between 6000 BC and 3000 BC. Due to proximity and trade the western Mediterranean passed through roughly analogous cultural phases in the Neolithic. These are perhaps best defined for Sardinia, a larger and better archaeologically explored island. The dating scheme in the titles below is based on a Sardinian chronology rounded to millennia.

=== Early ===
The Early Neolithic of Corsica is defined to include the time period between 6000 BC and 5000 BC. The Early Neolithic of Corsica comprises sites of the Cardial and Epi-Cardial Cultures divided in time about equally between the two. The seafaring population brought sheep, goats and pigs with them. Hunting was a minimal part of the economy. Occupation appears to have been intermittent.

The major sites are:

- A Petra (L'Île-Rousse)
- A Revellata (Calvi)
- Araguina-Sennola, Bonifacio
- Basi, Serra-di-Ferro
- Currachjaghju (Levie)
- Gritulu (Luri)
- Rinaghju (Sartène)
- Southwell (Vivario)
- Strette, Barbaggio
- Torre d'Aquila (Pietracorbara)

=== Middle ===
Corsica's Middle Neolithic Period occurs between 5000 BC and 4000 BC. During the "Middle Neolithic Transformation" cattle were introduced, the production of grain began and permanent villages were founded.

- Araguina-Sennola, Bonifacio
- Basi (Serra-di-Ferro)
- Cardiccia (Sartène)
- Currachjaghju (Levie)
- La Figue (Sartène)
- Monte Grossu (Biguglia)
- Monte Revincu (Santo-Pietro-di-Tenda)
- Pughjaredda (Poghjaredda) (Sotta)
- Presa-Tusiu (Altagène)
- Scaffa Piana, Oletta
- Strette, Barbaggio
- Terrina IV, Aléria
- Torre d'Aquila (Pietracorbara)

=== Late ===
Late occurs between 4000 BC and 3000 BC. The Late Neolithic on Corsica and Sardinia corresponds to the early European Megalithic Culture. The monuments specifically found on Corsica are the dolmen, the aligned stones and the menhir; however, the latter include anthropomorphic or statue-menhirs with features of the head and torso carved on the upper block. Some have taken them for stelae.

- Filitosa, Sollacaro
- Strette, Barbaggio
- Terrina IV, Aléria
- A Mutula (Belgodère)
- Cauria XX-XXI (Sartène)
- I Calanchi / Sapar'’Alta (Sollacaro)
- Monte Lazzu, Tiuccia (Casaglione)
- Southwell (Vivario)
- Terrina IV (Aléria)

== Chalcolithic ==
The Chalcolithic period occurred between 3000 BC and 1800 BC. The European Megalithic Culture continued into the Chalcolithic. Weapons began to be shown on the statue menhirs.

- Terrina IV, Aléria
- Filitosa, Sollacaro
- Strette, Barbaggio

== Bronze Age ==
The Bronze Age occurs on Corsica between 1800 BC and 700 BC. The Torrean civilization of the Corsican Bronze Age is named for its torri, "towers", which are the outstanding features of building complexes - citadels perhaps - sited on the lower slopes of the mountains overlooking the coastline. The culture continued the statue menhirs of the preceding Megalithic Culture, in many cases reusing the previous ones, but now they represent warriors armed and armored with Mycenaean-style daggers and swords and round shields. A few have the horned helmets diagnostically depicted in representations of the Shardana, one of the Sea Peoples of the eastern Aegean Sea.

Torréen society was armed, metallurgical and international. During that time the island manufactured and exported bronze ingots and artifacts that have turned up elsewhere in the Mediterranean.

The torri appear to be miniature versions of the contemporaneous nuraghes found on Sardinia. The Nuraghes Culture lived a way of life indistinguishable from that of the Torréen. Both were bronze-making warrior societies. The name of Sardinia almost certainly came from the name of the Shardana people. Analogous but more on the scale of the Corsican torri are the talaiots of the Balearic Islands and the sesi of Pantelleria.

Torréen, Nuraghes and Shardana appear to be interrelated; however, the relationships remain ambiguous. It is not known whether the Shardana were from Sardinia or from somewhere else, such as Sardis, and settled in Sardinia. The earliest nuraghi were constructed far back in the Neolithic; i.e., they appear to be a development of the Megalithic Culture. The torri on the one hand represent something new in Corsica; on the other hand, the associated statue menhirs evolved from those of the Neolithic. It can be argued that the reuse of the menhirs suggests a population influx, but the argument depends on an unknown implied taboo against reusing old menhirs. These issues remain open.

Some sites are:

== Iron Age (700-100 BC) ==
Iron Age occurs between 700 BC and 100 BC.

- Aléria:
  - Etruscan necropolis, 6th-3rd centuries BC
  - Roman town, 1st century BC -
- Bonifacio:
  - Roman villa, 1st century AD -
- Luri:
  - Castellu di Luri, Roman castellum occupied 3rd century BC - 1st century AD

== Ligurian hypothesis ==
The Ligurian hypothesis is the theory that the prehistoric populations of the western Mediterranean islands were descended from the ancestors of the ancient Ligurians, once widespread. In 1889 and 1894, Marie Henri d'Arbois de Jubainville proposed an Indo-European substrate language for Corsica, Sardinia, eastern Spain, southern France, and western Italy based on the occurrence there of place names ending in -asco, -asca, -usco, -osco, -osca, or modifications of them, as well as -inco and -inca.

In his view, two recognized but unknown languages mentioned by classical authors were survivals: Ligurian and Iberian. This choice of languages relies on Seneca the Younger, who spent eight years in exile on Corsica starting in 41 AD and expressed the opinion that the coastal Corsicans were Ligurian but the inlanders were of Iberian extraction, most like the Cantabri. As the language was probably still alive in his day, his opinions have been taken seriously.

Some prominent early linguists, including Paul Kretschmer and Julius Pokorny, then went further with the concept of a Celto-Ligurian substrate. The pursuit of this "Ligurian shadow" came ultimately to nothing definitive, but the place names remain and meanwhile Ligurian and Iberian came to be associated with the Cardium pottery culture, which in the western Mediterranean had about the same distribution as the names. On Corsica, some sites of that culture were continuously occupied until the Iron Age.

Jubainville's list of those toponyms in Corsica include, north of the Tavignano River: Venzolasca, Grillasca village in Olmeto, Feciasco and Prucinasca in Barbaggio, Martinasche in Nonza, Cipronasco in Sisco, Palasca, Ruisseau de Bartasca in Calvi, Popolasca, the hamlet of Caposciasca in Pianello, Baraniasche in Castello-di-Rostino, and Velflasca in Zalana. South of the Tavignano: Mount Ecilasca near Pietroso, Mount Filasca near Corrano, the hamlet of Solasca in Peri, Fiummasca in Rosazia, Acellasca in Pietrosella, Moraschi in Bocognano, and Bodiciasche in Cauro.

The -asco suffixes are not present in Sartène, but Jubainville points to another set in use there: -inco and -inca, as in: Golfe de Valinco, Stavolinca peak, the Bevinco river in Bastia, Mount Revinco, Ruisseau de Saninco in Corte, and the hamlet of Capinca in Carbuccia. A settlement name of this type is listed in Ptolemy: Asinkon (Osincum). In addition are -aco and -aca, possibly from -asco: Cargiaca, Viaca peak, Urtaca, Mount Faraca, Tavaco, and Venaco. For detailed comparisons with continental names, see Jubainville.

All of these hypotheses have become outdated, and there is a general consensus today that the Ligurian language, if it existed as a distinct form at all, was certainly Indo-European in nature. It appears to have shared many features with other Indo-European languages, primarily Celtic (Gaulish) and Italic (Latin and the Osco-Umbrian languages). Historical attempts to define these languages were often made under the assumption that languages do not generally evolve beyond regional dialects, and at the time of Jubainville's work, the concept of the Indo-European language family was loosely defined and most of the significant work on the subject did not occur until the following century, at which time it became quite clear that the Celtic languages were distinctly Indo-European, and that the hypothesized Ligurian language was clearly derivative of that family of languages.

== See also ==
- History of Corsica
- Bizzicu Rossu
- Figa la Sarra

== Bibliography ==
- Costa, Laurent-Jacques (2004). Corse préhistorique: peuplement d'une île et modes de vie des sociétés insulaires, IXe-IIe millénaires av. J.-C (in French). Paris: Errance. ISBN 2-87772-273-2..
- Costa, Laurent-Jacques (2006). Questions d'économie préhistorique. Modes de vie et échange en corse et en Sardaigne (in French). Ajaccio: Éditions du CRDP..
