= Presa =

Presa may refer to:

- Preša, village in the Municipality of Majšperk in northeastern Slovenia
- Presa Canario, Spanish breed of large dog of mastiff or catch dog type
- Presa-Tusiu, archaeological site in Corsica
- Presa de Montejaque, reservoir in the province of Málaga, Andalusia, Spain
- Prezë, a village in Albania

== See also ==
- La Presa (disambiguation)
