= Stantari =

Coordinates: 41°31′49″N 8°55′19″E

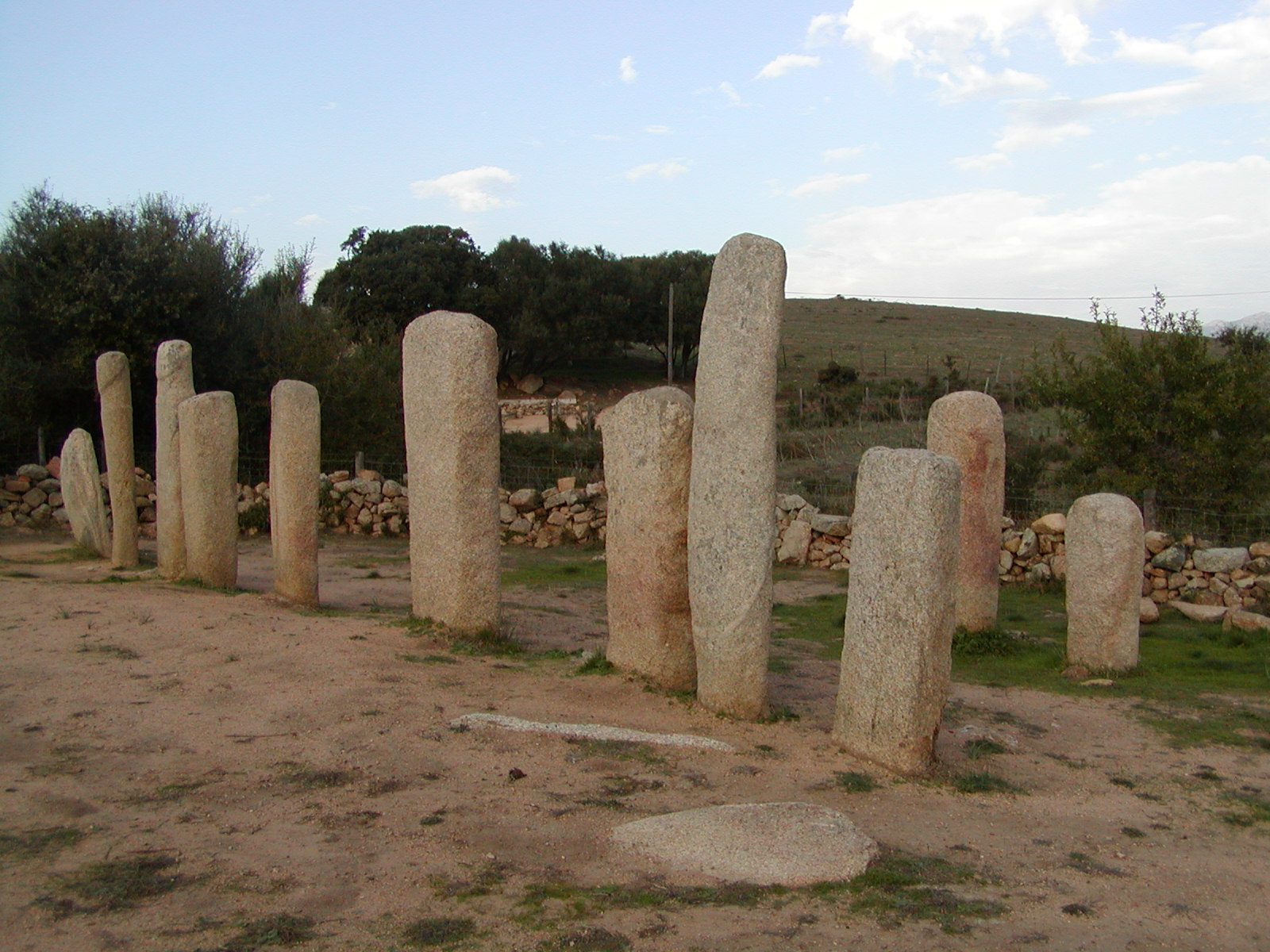
Stantari

Stantari is an archaeological site in Corsica. It is located in "Cauria", commune of Sartène.

The alignments of Stantari is close to the dolmen of Funtanaccia; in a distance of 300 m in the south are Rinaghju alignments.
