= Paddaghju =

Archaeological site in Sartène, Corsica

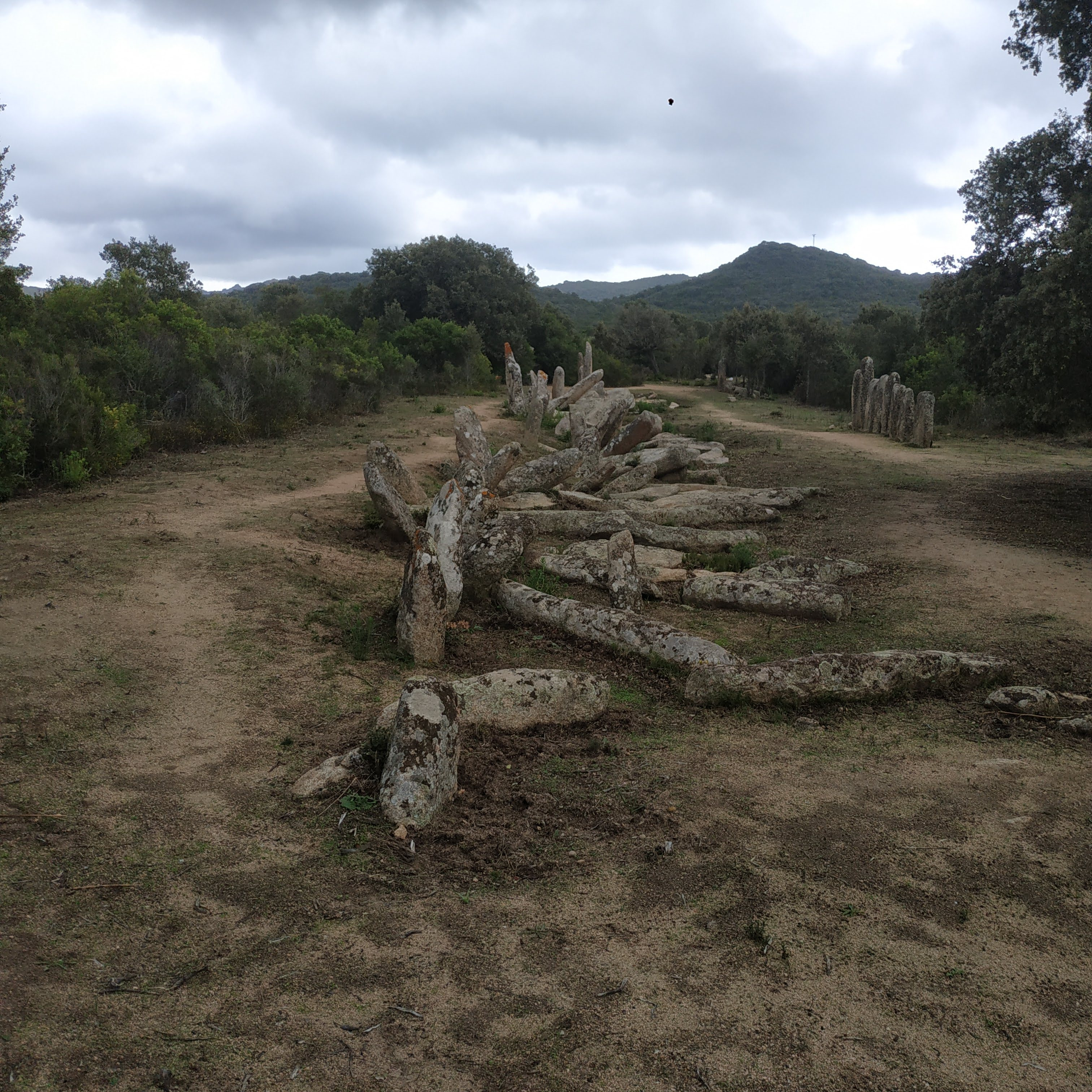
- The site in 2020

- Location in Corsica, France
- 41.557123°N 8.886791°E
- Type: Stone rows
- Location: Corsica, France

History
- Built: c. 1750 BC

Site notes
- Material: Stone

The Alignment of Paddaghju (or Palaghju, Pagliajo) is an archaeological site in Corsica. It is a collection of stone rows, located in the commune of Sartène.

== See also ==
- Apazzu
- List of historical monuments in South Corsica
