= La Presa =

La Presa may refer to:

- La Presa (borough), a borough of the municipality of Tijuana in Baja California, Mexico
- La Presa, California, a census-designated place in the East County region of San Diego County, California, United States
- La Presa, Texas, a census-designated place in Webb County, Texas, United States
- La Presa (Mexibús), a BRT station in Chimalhuacán, Mexico
- La Presa, a fictional place in Forevermore (TV series)

== See also ==
- La Prensa (disambiguation)
- Presa (disambiguation)
- La presa di Roma
