= Prensa Libre =

Prensa Libre may refer to:

- La Prensa Libre, a Costa Rican newspaper founded in 1889
- Prensa Libre (Cuba), a Cuban newspaper founded in 1941
- Prensa Libre (Guatemala), a Guatemalan newspaper founded in 1951

== See also ==
- La Prensa (disambiguation)
