= Filitosa =

Archaeological site in Corsica, France

Coordinates: 41°44′50″N 8°52′17″E

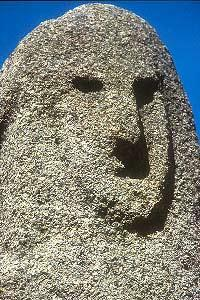
Filitosa

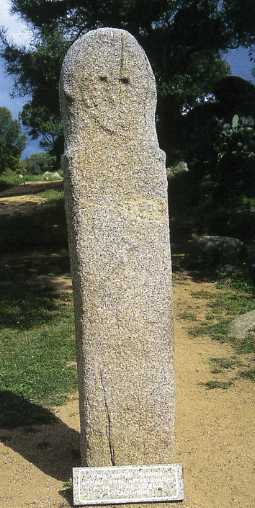
Filitosa

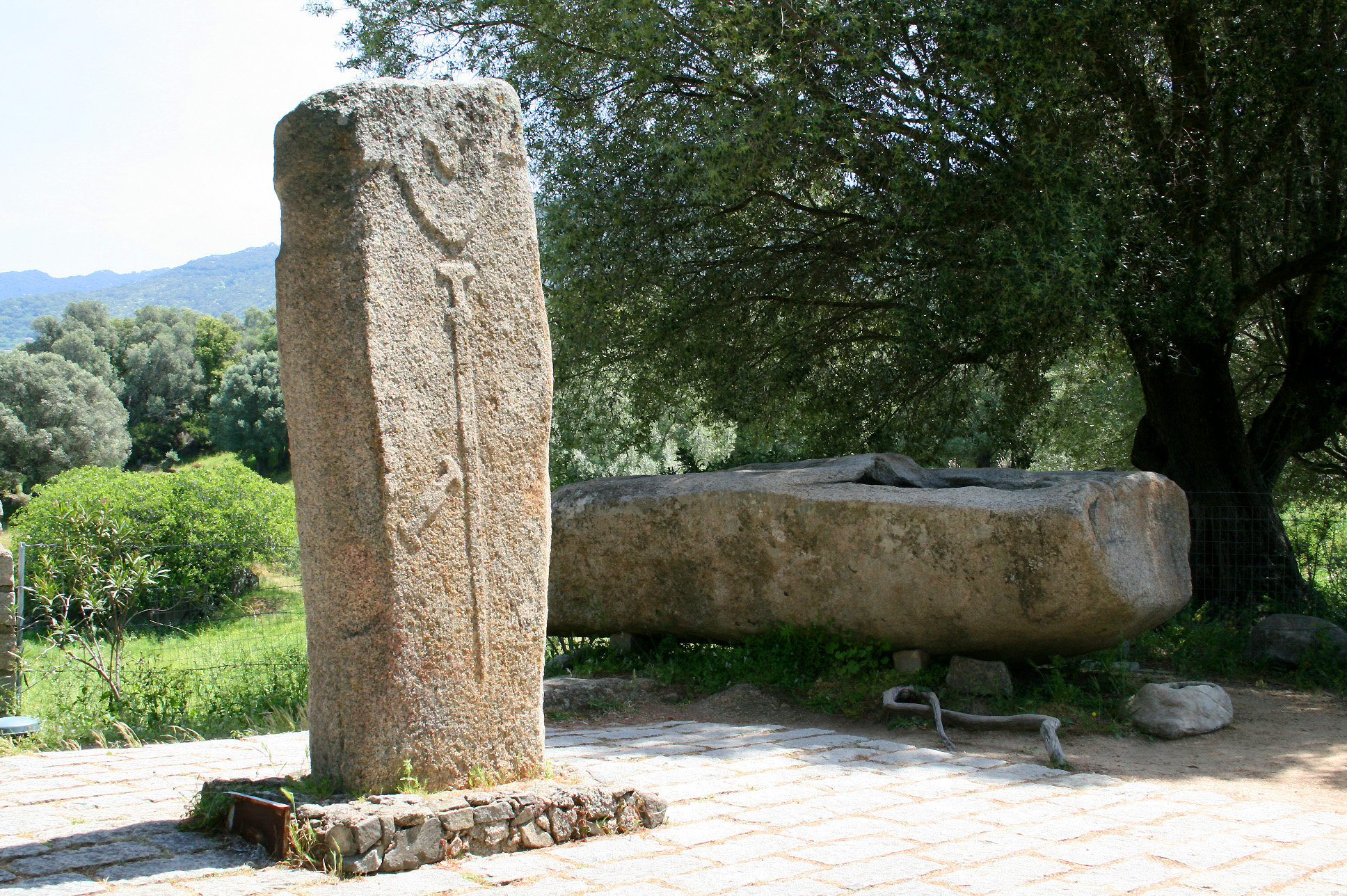
Filitosa V

Filitosa is a megalithic site in southern Corsica, France. The period of occupation spans from the end of the Neolithic era and the beginning of the Bronze Age, until around the Roman times in Corsica.

== Location ==
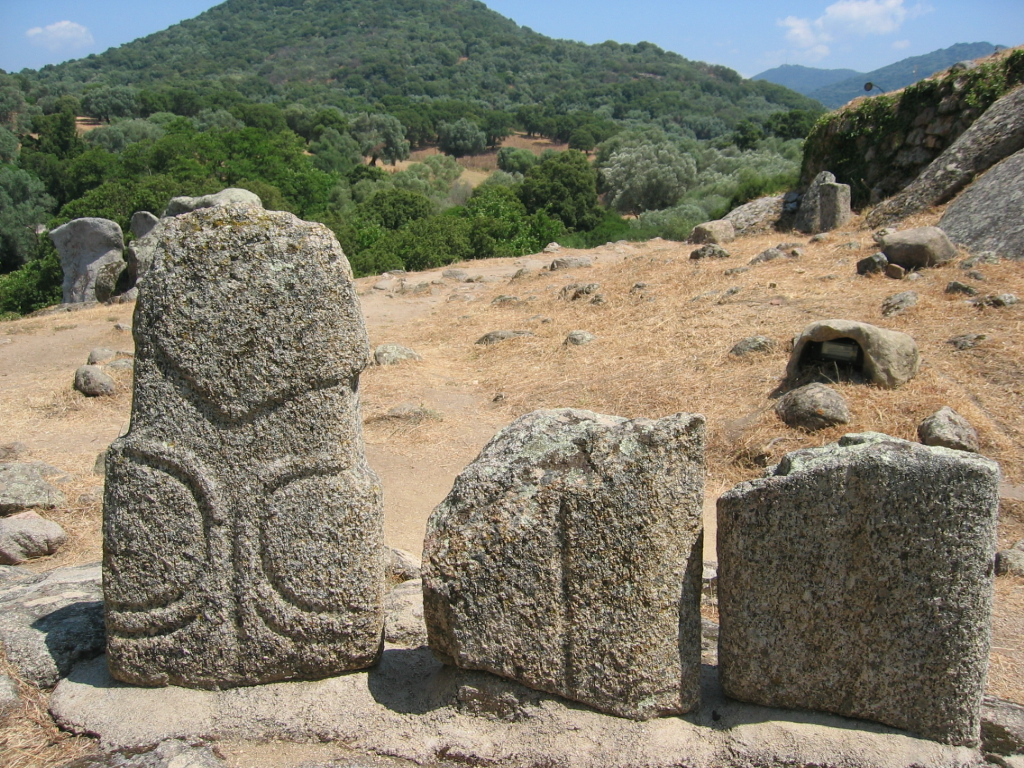
Back of Statue Menhir

The site lies on road D57, a few hundred metres from the hamlet of Filitosa, 5 km west of Sollacaro, in the canton of Petreto-Bicchisano, arrondissement of Sartène, north of Propriano in the Corse-du-Sud département. It is located on a hill, overlooking the Taravo valley.

== Site history and features ==
The site was discovered in 1946 by the owner of the land, Charles-Antoine Cesari, and brought to the attention of archeologists by the British writer, Dorothy Carrington (see her masterpiece, Granite Island: Portrait of Corsica,). Systematic excavations started in 1954 by Roger Grosjean. Finds of arrow heads and pottery date earliest inhabitation to 3300 BC. Around 1500 BC, 2-3 metre menhirs were erected. They have been carved with representations of human faces, armour and weapons. Roger Grosjean thought the menhirs may have been erected to ward off an invasion of a group of people called the Torréens (Torreans). However this was unsuccessful: the menhirs were cast down, broken up and reused in some cases as building material by the Torréens. The Torréens built circular stone structures on the site, known as torri (or torre), which may have been used as temples. The torri are remarkably well preserved. This theory had been disputed by later works of F. De Lanfranchi, M.C. Weiss and Gabriel Camps.

In total, about twenty menhirs of various times were counted in Filitosa. They constitute approximately half of the total staff of these monuments in Corsica.

== Layout ==
The site of Filitosa is approached down a track through an ancient olive grove. The first monument to be seen is a rock overhang and surrounding wall. Then the visitor comes upon the central monument. Various hut platforms are all around, and the track leads a further 50m to the Western Monument or torri. From there, one can enjoy a view down the hill to a stone alignment of five megaliths, set around the base of a 2000-year-old olive tree. Behind the olive tree is the quarry from which the megaliths were extracted.
