= Torra di Seneca =

Genoese coastal defence tower in Corsica

Tower of Seneca
- Torra di Seneca (Corsican)
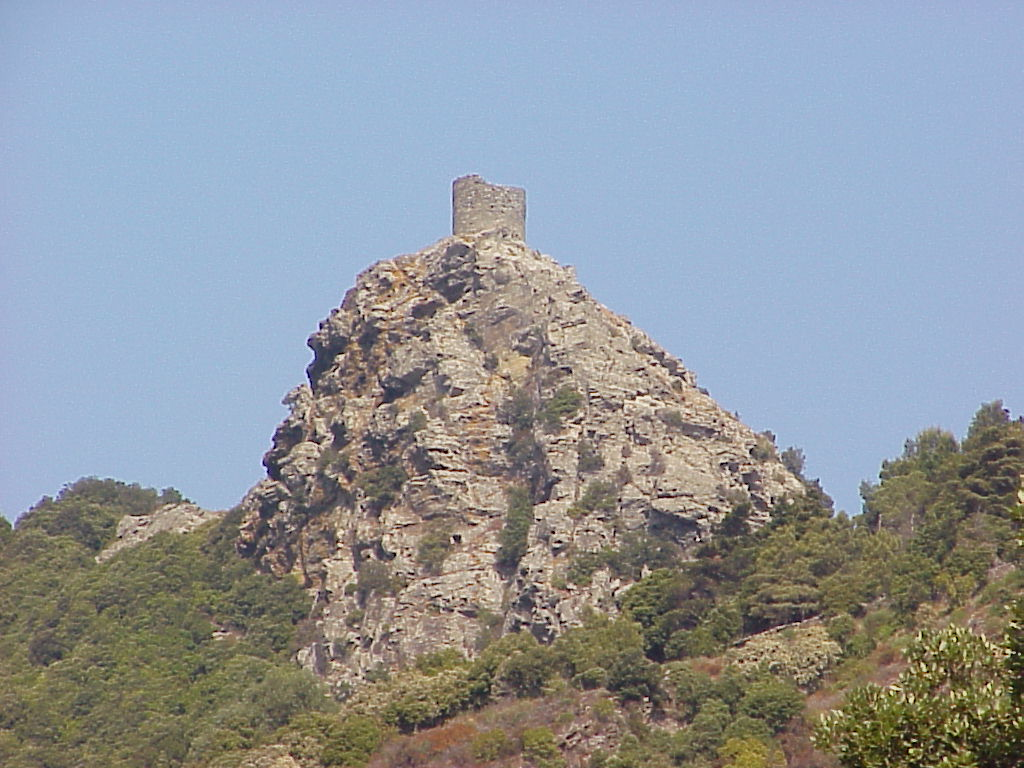

- Location within Corsica
- 42°54′18″N 9°22′21″E

History
- Built: 16th century

Monument historique
- Designated: 1840
- Reference no.: PA00099211

The Tower of Seneca (Corsican: Torra di Seneca) is a ruined Genoese tower located in the commune of Luri in the Cap Corse region of the Corsica.

The tower was built in the 16th century. It was one of a series of defences constructed by the Republic of Genoa between 1530 and 1620 to stem the attacks by Barbary pirates.

The tower now belongs to the commune. In 1840 it was added to the official list of the historical monuments of France.

== See also ==
- List of Genoese towers in Corsica
