= Casteddu di Puzzonu =

Archaeological site in Corsica, France

Casteddu di Puzzonu is an archaeological site in Corsica. It is located in the commune of Sartène.
