= Luri (river) =

Stream in the department of Haute-Corse, Corsica

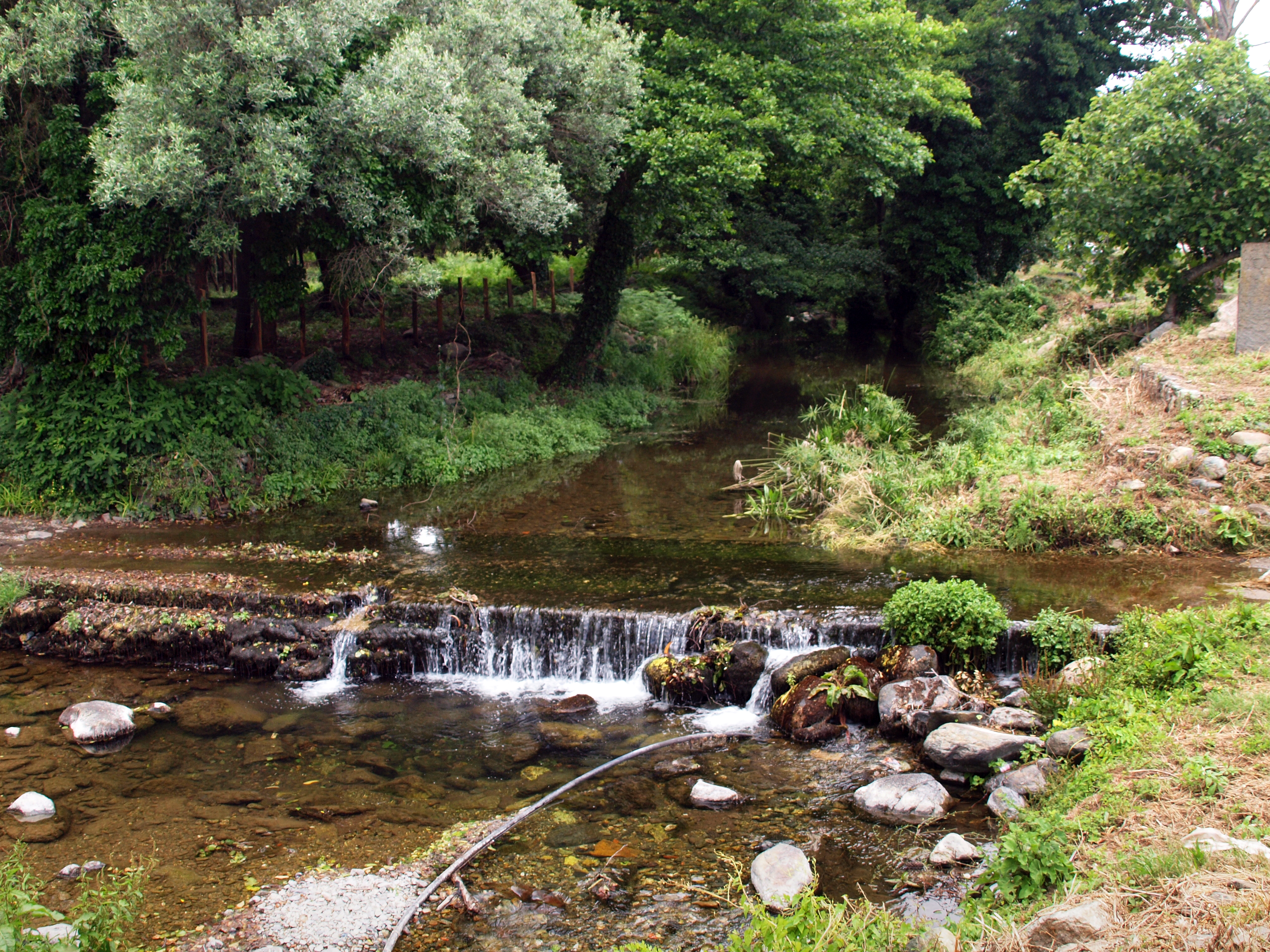
- Campu ford over the Luri

- Location within Corsica Location within France

Location
- Country: France
- Region: Corsica
- Department: Haute-Corse
- Commune: Luri

Physical characteristics
- Mouth: Tyrrhenian Sea
  - coordinates: 42.8856°N 9.4738°E

The Luri (French: Ruisseau de Luri) is a coastal stream in the department of Haute-Corse, Corsica, France. It flows across the Cap Corse peninsula to the Tyrrhenian Sea.

== Course ==
The Luri is 10.96 kilometres (6.81 mi) long. It crosses the commune of Luri, Haute-Corse. The only named tributary of the Luri is the 5 kilometres (3.1 mi) Ruisseau de Furcone, which enters the Luri from the south near the village of Luri. The Luri rises in the northwest of the Cap Corse peninsula to the northeast of the 836 metres (2,743 ft) Monte Grofiglieta. It flows northeast past the village of Spergane, then east-southeast past the villages of Luri and Campo to enter the sea at Santa Severa. The D180 follows the stream for most of its course.

== Hydrology ==
Measurements of the river flow were taken at the Luri [Campo] station from 1972 to 1999. The watershed above this station covers 18.8 square kilometres (7.3 sq mi). Annual precipitation was calculated as 355 millimetres (14.0 in). The average water flow throughout the year was 0.211 cubic metres per second (7.5 cu ft/s).

Average flow (cubic meters per second) by month for the period 1972 to 1999
Month	Flow
Jan	0.411
Feb	0.399
Mar	0.299
Apr	0.264
May	0.242
Jun	0.077
Jul	0.025
Aug	0.011
Sep	0.037
Oct	0.166
Nov	0.271
Dec	0.339

== Sources ==
- "Le Luri à Luri [Campo]", eaufrance (in French), Ministère de l'Ecologie, du Développement Durable et de l'Energie
- "Relation: Ruisseau de Luri (9415667)", OpenStreetMap (in French)
- "Ruisseau de Luri", Sandre (in French)
