= Monte Lazzu =

Coordinates: 42.0716°N 8.7369°E

Monte Lazzu is an archaeological site in Casaglione, Corsica.
