= Gritulu =

Gritulu is an archaeological site in Corsica. It is located in the commune of Luri, Haute-Corse.
