= La Prensa =

La Prensa may refer to:

== North America ==
- La Prensa (California), founded 1999, serving Riverside and San Bernardino counties, owned by Southern California News Group
- La Prensa (Florida), a Central Florida publication owned by ImpreMedia
- La Prensa (Michigan), a newspaper of Detroit, Michigan
- La Prensa (San Antonio), a former newspaper in Texas
- La Prensa de San Antonio, a Spanish/English newspaper in San Antonio, Texas
- El Diario La Prensa, a New York City publication founded as La Prensa
- La Prensa (Mexico City), a newspaper published by the Organización Editorial Mexicana

== Central America and the Caribbean ==
- Prensa Latina, the official state news agency of Cuba
- La Prensa Gráfica, commonly known as La Prensa, a newspaper in El Salvador
- La Prensa (Honduras), a newspaper in Honduras
- La Prensa (Panama City), a newspaper in Panama

== South America ==
- La Prensa (Buenos Aires), a newspaper in Argentina
- La Prensa (La Paz), a newspaper in Bolivia
- La Prensa (Curicó), a newspaper in Chile
- La Prensa (Riobamba), a newspaper in Ecuador
- La Prensa (Managua), a newspaper in Nicaragua
- La Prensa (Peru), a former newspaper published in Lima

== Europe ==
- La Prensa (Barcelona), a newspaper in Spain

== See also ==
- Prensa Libre (disambiguation)
- La Presa (disambiguation)
