= Tremeca =

Archaeological site in Corsica

Coordinates: 42°4′26″N 8°46′52″E

Tremeca is an archaeological site in Corsica. The site is located in west-central Corsica, near Casaglione.

== Description ==
Tremeca was first described by the archaeologist Roger Grosjean in his 1966 overview of prehistoric Corsican sites. The ancient dolmen stands in the narrowest part of a small plateau; it is approximately hemispherical in its design, supported by four rough-hewn granite blocks capped with a slab. The structure of the dolmen opens toward the southeast. Its design is rudimentary when compared to menhirs and other nearby structures.

The region has not been extensively excavated, with one of the few nearby megalithic sites being that of Monte Lazzo.
