= Presa de Montejaque =

Reservoir in Montejaque, Andalusia, Spain

Coordinates: 36.75357°N 5.23979°W

Presa de Montejaque was a reservoir in the province of Málaga, Andalusia, Spain. It is also known as "Presa del Hundidero" and "Presa de los Caballeros"

== River ==
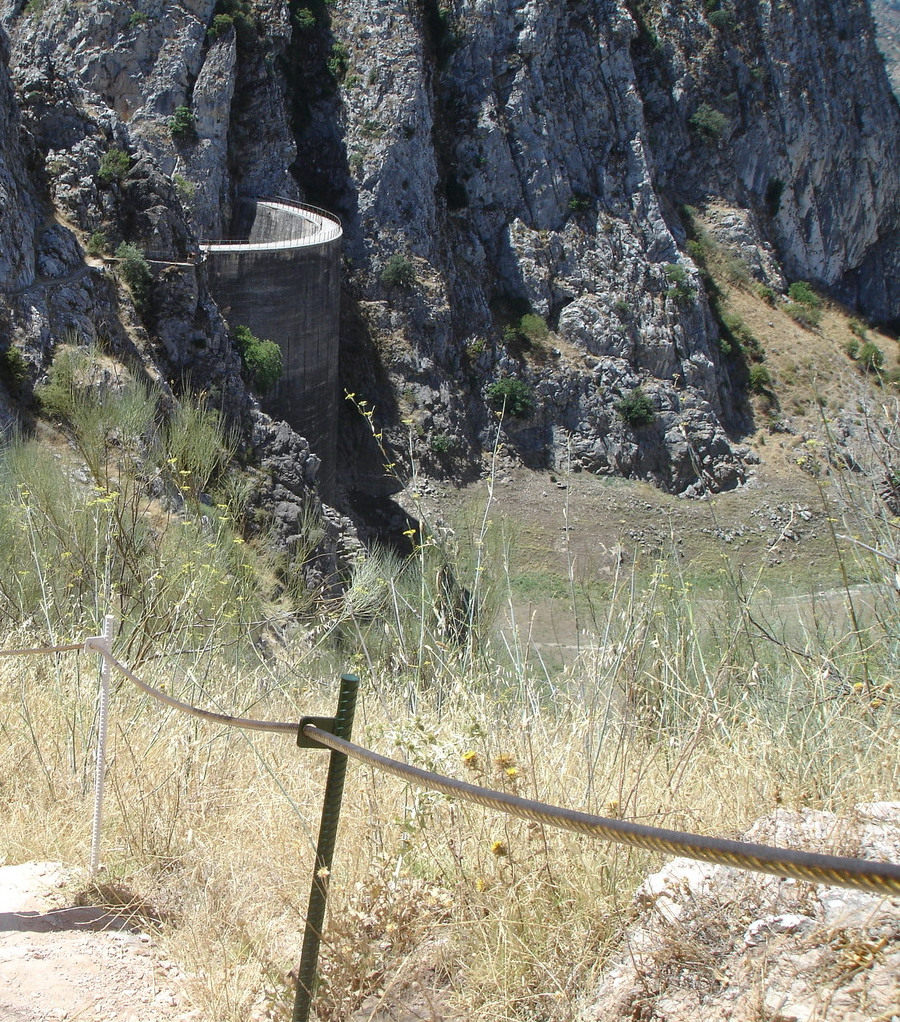
Wall

Le reservoir gets water from Gaduares river.

== Construction ==
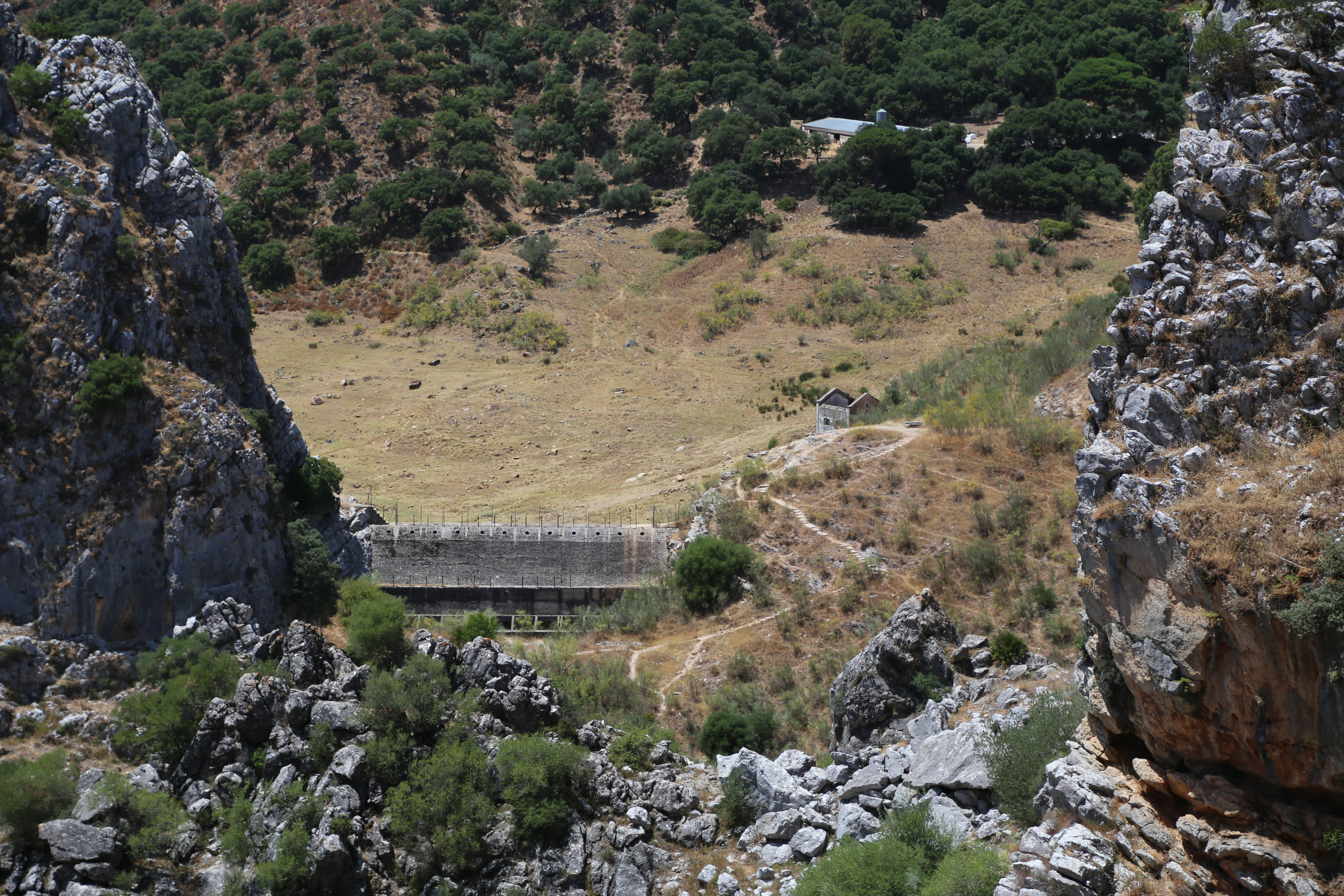
Wall

The preliminary studies to build the wall started in 1917, and the project was abandoned in 1947, unable to keep water inside the walls

== See also ==
- List of reservoirs and dams in Andalusia
