= Cauria =

Archeological site in Corsica

Coordinates: 41°31′44″N 8°55′14″E

Cauria is an archaeological site in Corsica. It is located in the commune of Sartène.
