= Sartène =

Subprefecture and commune in Corsica, France

Sartène Sartè (Corsican)
- Subprefecture and commune
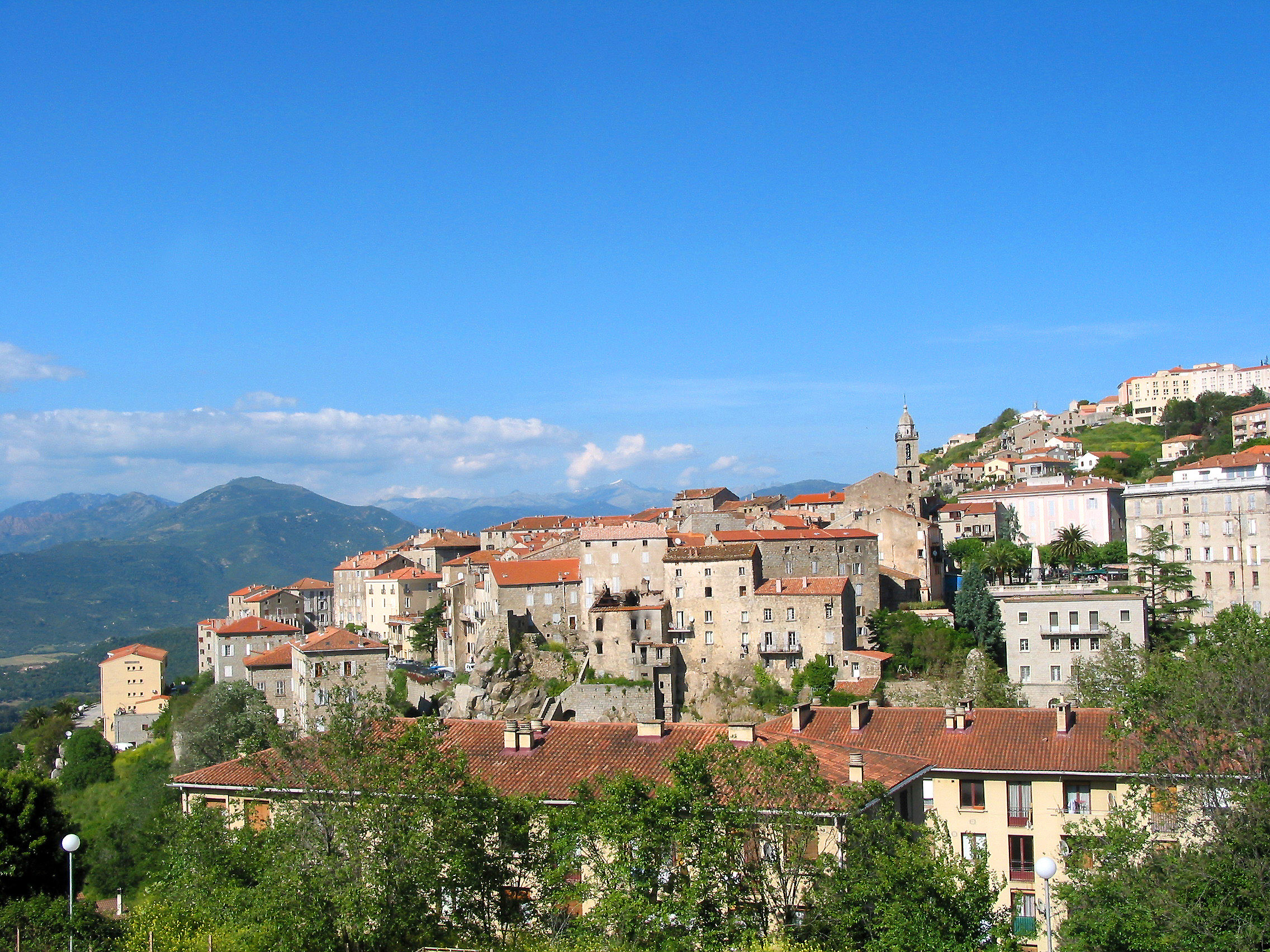
- A general view of Sartène

- Coat of arms
- Location of Sartène
- Location within France Location within Corsica
- Coordinates: 41°37′18″N 8°58′27″E
- Country: France
- Region: Corsica
- Department: Corse-du-Sud
- Arrondissement: Sartène
- Canton: Sartenais-Valinco

Government
  - Mayor (2020–2026): Paul Quilichini
- Area^{1}: 200.4 km^{2} (77.4 sq mi)
- Elevation: 330 m (1,080 ft)
- Highest elevation: 1,320 m (4,330 ft)
- Lowest elevation: 0 m (0 ft)
- Population (2023): 3,742
  - Density: 18.67/km^{2} (48.36/sq mi)
- Time zone: UTC+01:00 (CET)
  - Summer (DST): UTC+02:00 (CEST)
- INSEE/Postal code: 2A272 /20100
- ^{1} French Land Register data, which excludes lakes, ponds, glaciers > 1 km^{2} (0.386 sq mi or 247 acres) and river estuaries.

Sartène (French: [saʁtɛn]; Corsican: Sartè [sarˈtɛ]; Italian: Sartena [sarˈtɛːna] or Sartene [sarˈtɛːne]) is a commune in the department of Corse-du-Sud on the island of Corsica, France.

Its history dates back to medieval times and granite buildings from the early 16th century still line some of the streets. One of the main incidents in the town's history was an attack by pirates from Algiers in 1583, after which 400 people were taken away. These attacks continued into the 18th century.

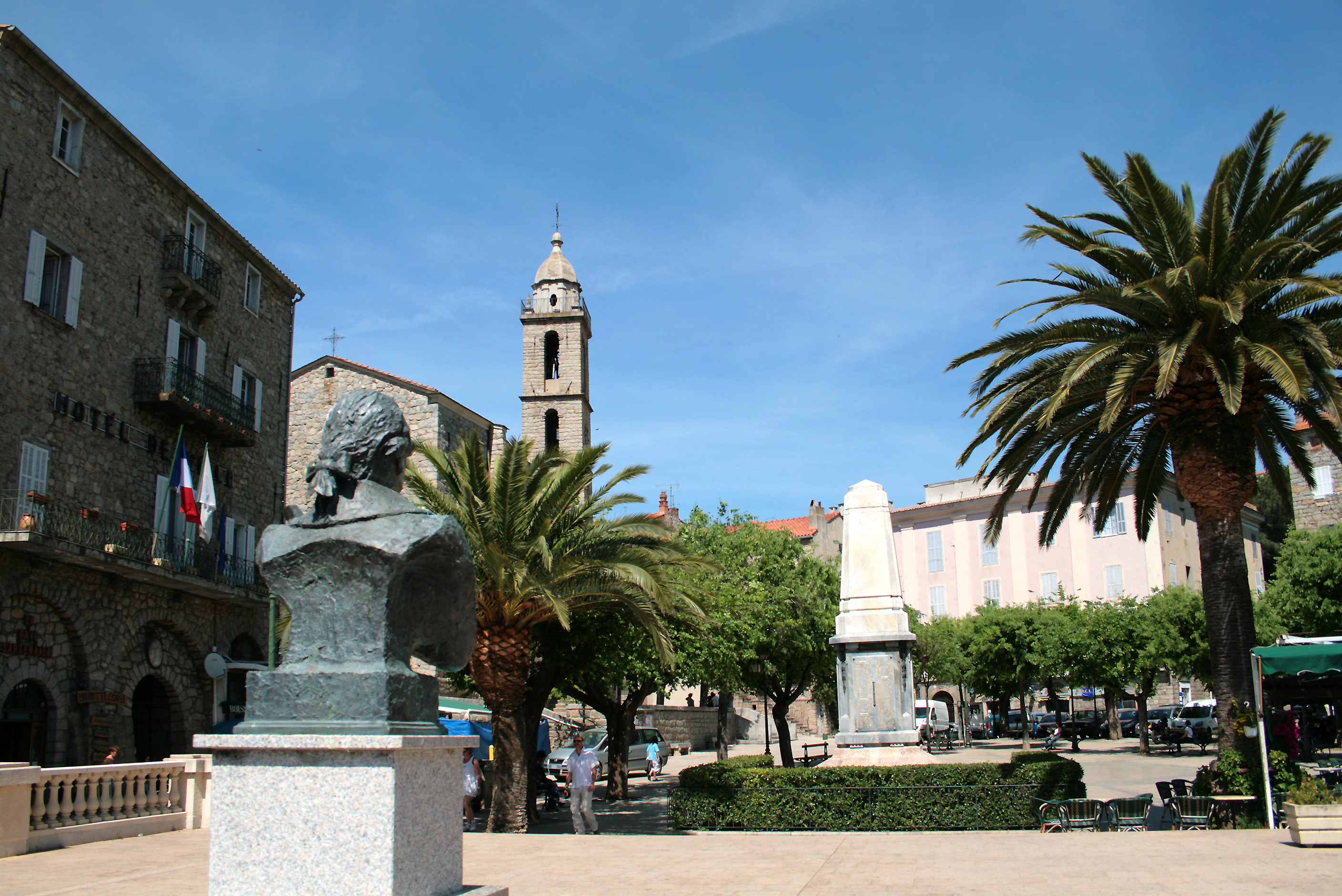
Place de la Liberation

The town is centred on the Place de la Liberation (previously the Place Porta), at the edge of which is the church of Sainte Marie. The town allows good views across the valley. Sartène wine is appreciated by wine connoisseurs for its good quality.

Sartène has given its name to one of the southern Corsican dialects a variety of which is the Gallurese spoken in North Sardinia.

== Geography ==
=== Climate ===
Sartène has a mediterranean climate (Köppen climate classification Csa). The average annual temperature in Sartène is 15.8 °C (60.4 °F). The average annual rainfall is 732.1 mm (28.82 in) with November as the wettest month. The temperatures are highest on average in August, at around 23.9 °C (75.0 °F), and lowest in February, at around 8.9 °C (48.0 °F). The highest temperature ever recorded in Sartène was 43.4 °C (110.1 °F) on 23 July 2009; the coldest temperature ever recorded was −4.8 °C (23.4 °F) on 1 February 1999.

Climate data for Sartène (1991–2020 averages, extremes 1996−present)
Month	Jan	Feb	Mar	Apr	May	Jun	Jul	Aug	Sep	Oct	Nov	Dec	Year
Record high °C (°F)	21.4 (70.5)	23.5 (74.3)	29.8 (85.6)	31.1 (88.0)	36.4 (97.5)	40.1 (104.2)	43.4 (110.1)	42.1 (107.8)	37.1 (98.8)	34.7 (94.5)	26.9 (80.4)	22.4 (72.3)	43.4 (110.1)
Mean daily maximum °C (°F)	13.6 (56.5)	14.0 (57.2)	16.4 (61.5)	19.2 (66.6)	23.3 (73.9)	28.0 (82.4)	30.6 (87.1)	30.9 (87.6)	26.7 (80.1)	23.0 (73.4)	17.9 (64.2)	14.5 (58.1)	21.5 (70.7)
Daily mean °C (°F)	9.0 (48.2)	8.9 (48.0)	11.0 (51.8)	13.6 (56.5)	17.3 (63.1)	21.3 (70.3)	23.7 (74.7)	23.9 (75.0)	20.6 (69.1)	17.5 (63.5)	13.2 (55.8)	10.0 (50.0)	15.8 (60.4)
Mean daily minimum °C (°F)	4.3 (39.7)	3.9 (39.0)	5.6 (42.1)	8.1 (46.6)	11.3 (52.3)	14.6 (58.3)	16.7 (62.1)	17.0 (62.6)	14.5 (58.1)	12.0 (53.6)	8.5 (47.3)	5.5 (41.9)	10.2 (50.4)
Record low °C (°F)	−4.6 (23.7)	−4.8 (23.4)	−3.8 (25.2)	−1.9 (28.6)	3.9 (39.0)	5.9 (42.6)	8.6 (47.5)	10.3 (50.5)	7.0 (44.6)	0.4 (32.7)	−4.7 (23.5)	−4.3 (24.3)	−4.8 (23.4)
Average precipitation mm (inches)	73.6 (2.90)	58.2 (2.29)	57.1 (2.25)	54.9 (2.16)	57.2 (2.25)	29.6 (1.17)	9.3 (0.37)	18.1 (0.71)	58.2 (2.29)	88.8 (3.50)	129.3 (5.09)	97.8 (3.85)	732.1 (28.82)
Average precipitation days (≥ 1.0 mm)	8.9	8.1	7.6	7.3	5.8	3.3	1.1	2.2	5.6	7.0	10.9	9.3	76.9
Source: Météo France

== Population ==
Historical population

Year	Pop.	±% p.a.
1800	1,882	—
1806	2,198	+2.62%
1821	2,200	+0.01%
1831	2,715	+2.13%
1836	2,682	−0.24%
1841	3,091	+2.88%
1846	3,892	+4.72%
1851	3,949	+0.29%
1856	3,874	−0.38%
1861	1,406	−18.35%
1866	4,082	+23.76%
1872	4,162	+0.32%
1876	4,724	+3.22%
1881	5,748	+4.00%
1886	5,608	−0.49%
1891	5,615	+0.02%
1896	6,154	+1.85%
1901	5,098	−3.70%

Year	Pop.	±% p.a.
1906	4,378	−3.00%
1911	4,746	+1.63%
1921	6,135	+2.60%
1926	6,445	+0.99%
1931	6,479	+0.11%
1936	6,174	−0.96%
1946	5,592	−0.99%
1954	5,543	−0.11%
1962	2,805	−8.16%
1968	2,913	+0.63%
1975	3,761	+3.72%
1982	3,044	−2.98%
1990	3,525	+1.85%
1999	3,410	−0.37%
2007	3,055	−1.36%
2012	3,418	+2.27%
2017	3,259	−0.95%
2023	3,742	+2.33%

Source: EHESS and INSEE (1968-2023)

== Sights ==
Genoese towers in the commune of Sartène:

- Torra di Roccapina
- Torra di Senetosa
- Torra di Tizzà

There are numerous archaeological sites in the commune or Sartène:

- A Figa
- Apazzu
- Cardiccia
- Casteddu di Puzzonu
- Cauria
- Funtanaccia
- Paddaghju
- Rinaghju
- Stantari

== See also ==
- Communes of the Corse-du-Sud department
