= Apazzu =

Archaeological site in Sartène, Corsica

Coordinates: 41°32′38″N 8°52′28″E

Apazzu is an archaeological site in Corsica. It is located in the commune of Sartène.
