= Poghjaredda =

Archaeological site in Haute-Corse, France

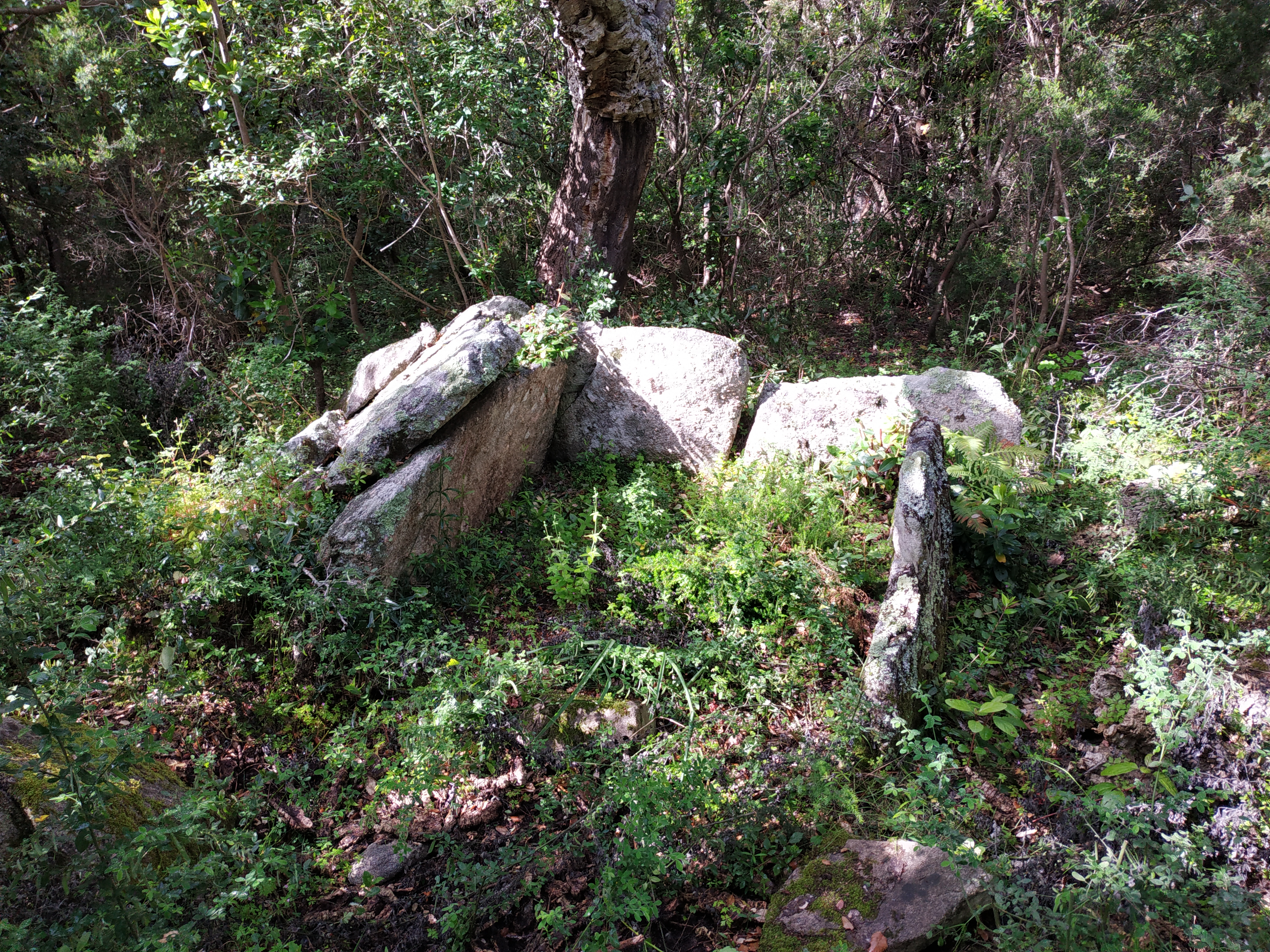
Coffre_de_Pughjaredda_sud

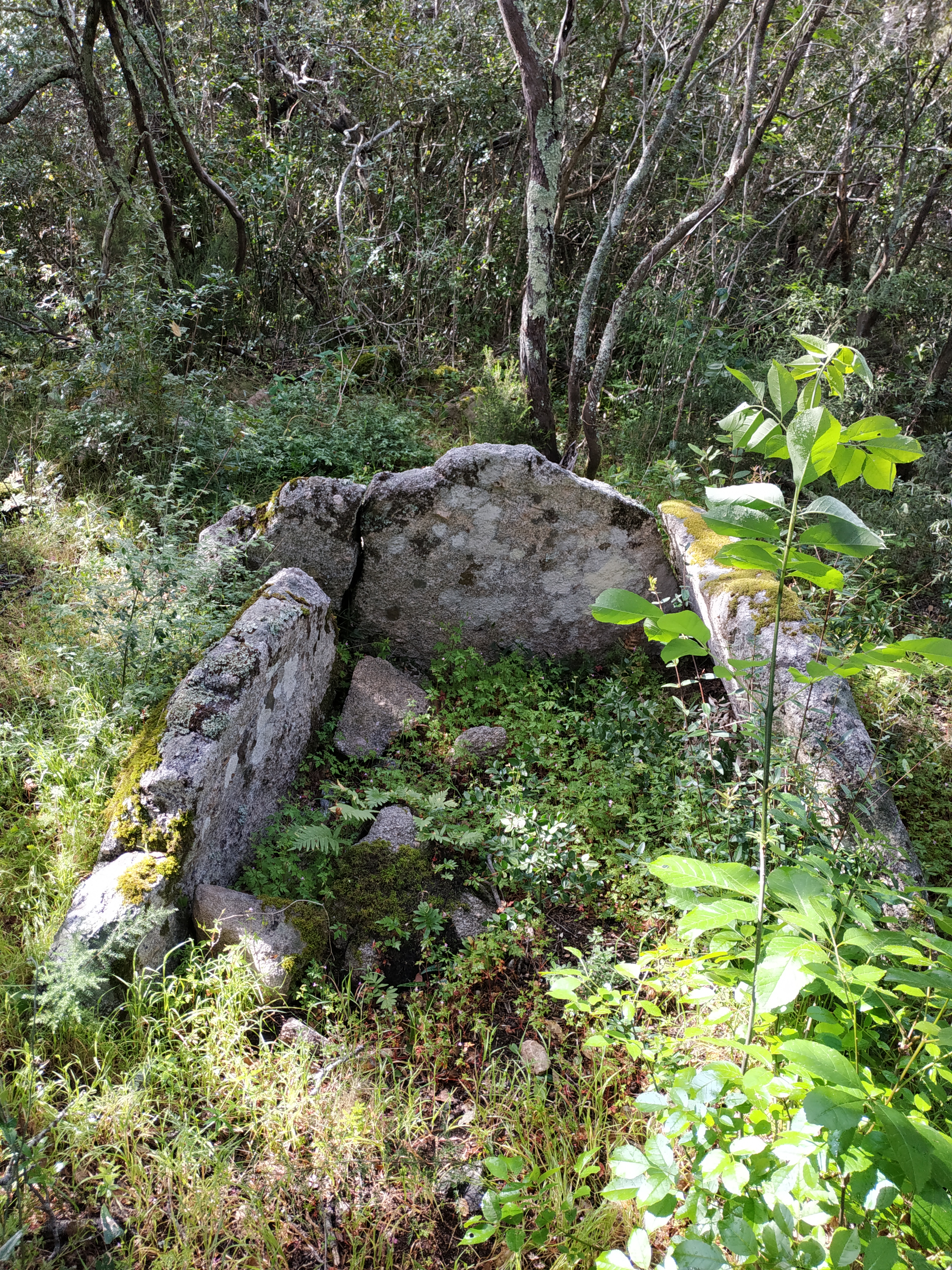
Coffre_de_Pughjaredda_nord

Poghjaredda (also known as Pughjaredda) is an archaeological site in Corsica. It is located in the commune of Sotta.
