= Rinaghju =

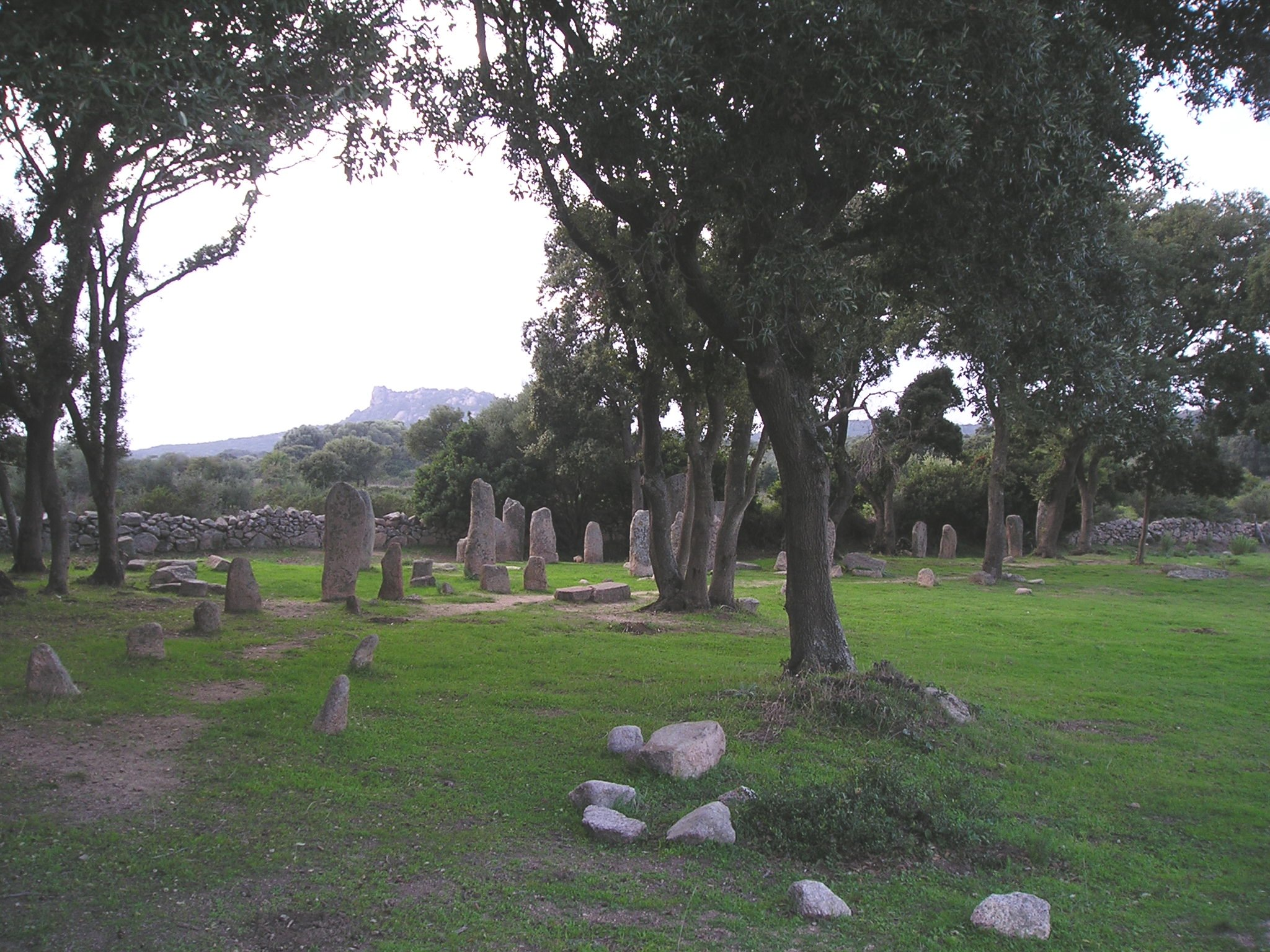
- The site in 2005
- Interactive map of Rinaghju
- 41°31′36″N 8°55′16″E
- Type: Archaeological site
- Location: Sartene, Corsica, France

History
- Built: c. 4250 BC

Site notes
- Material: Stone

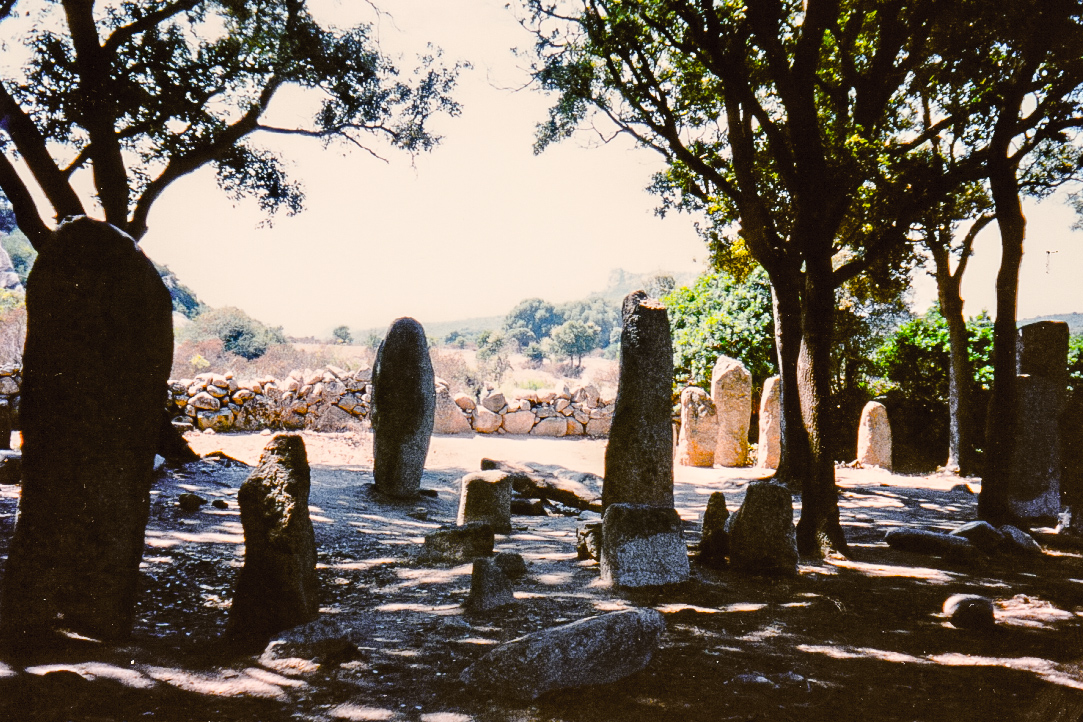
Stones at Rinaghju

Rinaghju (Renaju) is an archaeological site in Corsica. It is located in the commune of Sartène.

In a distance of 300 meters are Stantari alignments and the dolmen of Funtanaccia.
