= Monte Grossu =

Coordinates: 42°36′9″N 9°25′18″E

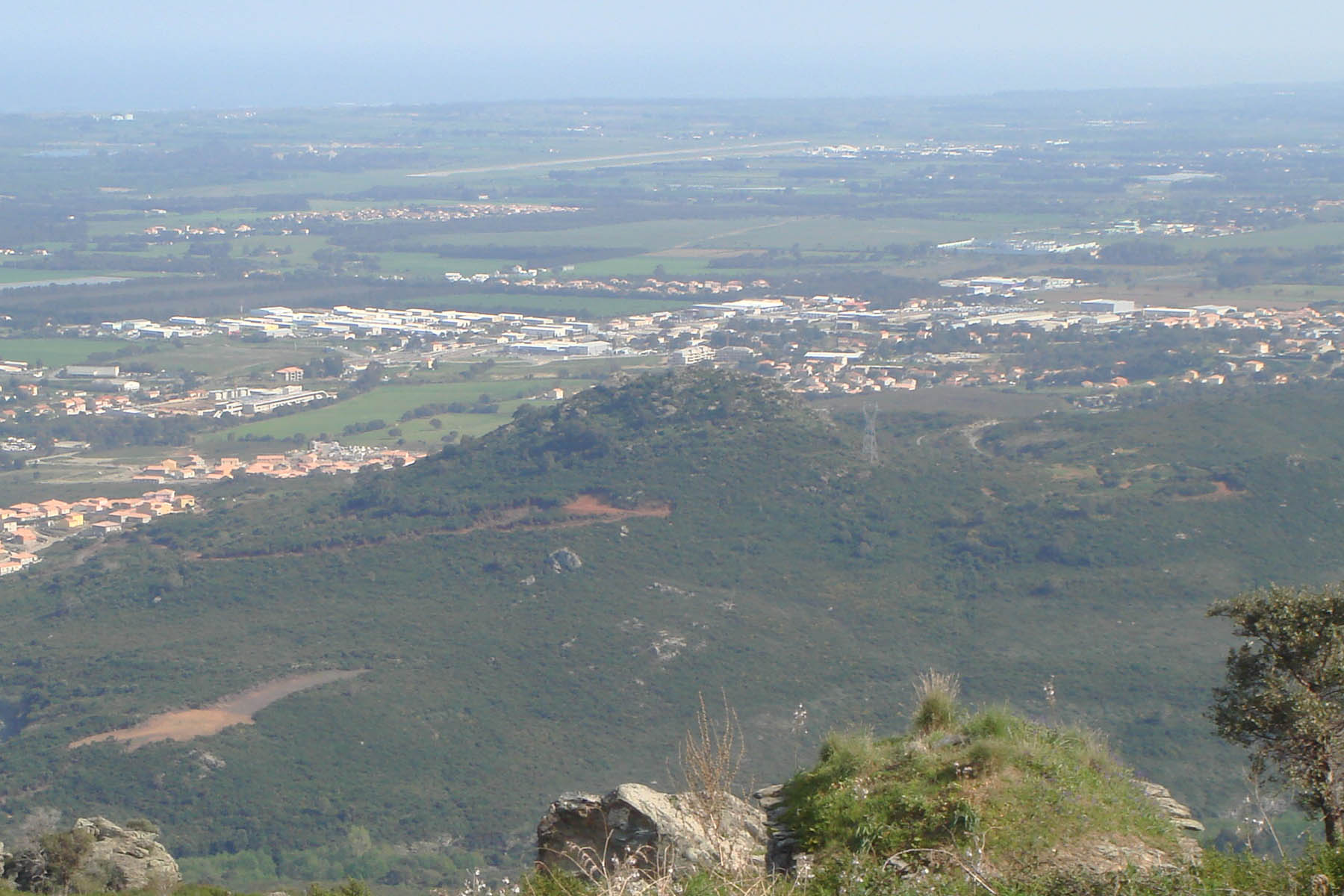
Monte Grossu, Biguglia, Corsica.

Monte Grossu is an archaeological site in Corsica. It is located in the commune of Biguglia.

The Monte Grossu is a small hill ( 192 m ) on the Biguglia town in Corsica. It overlooks the plain and the Biguglia ( whose real name is Chjurlinu ) and locks the parade Lancone. The Grossu Monte is an important archaeological site. Human occupation dates back to the Neolithic and Bronze Age. According to archaeologists (Weiss, Lanfranchi ), the site was home to a village of 300 huts.
