= Cardiccia =

Archaeological site in Corsica

Cardiccia is an archaeological site in Corsica. It is located in the commune of Sartène.
