= Currachjaghju =

Archaeological site in Haute-Corse, France

- Currachjaghju (Corsican)

Currachjaghju is an archaeological site in Levie, Corsica, France.
