= Presa-Tusiu =

Archaeological site in Haute-Corse, France

Presa-Tusiu is an archaeological site in Corsica. It is located in the commune of Altagène.
