= Araguina-Sennola =

Coordinates: 41.3885°N 9.1932°E

Araguina-Sennola is an archaeological site in Corsica. The prehistoric shelter is located in the commune of Bonifacio.
