= Casaglione =

Commune in Corsica, France

- Commune
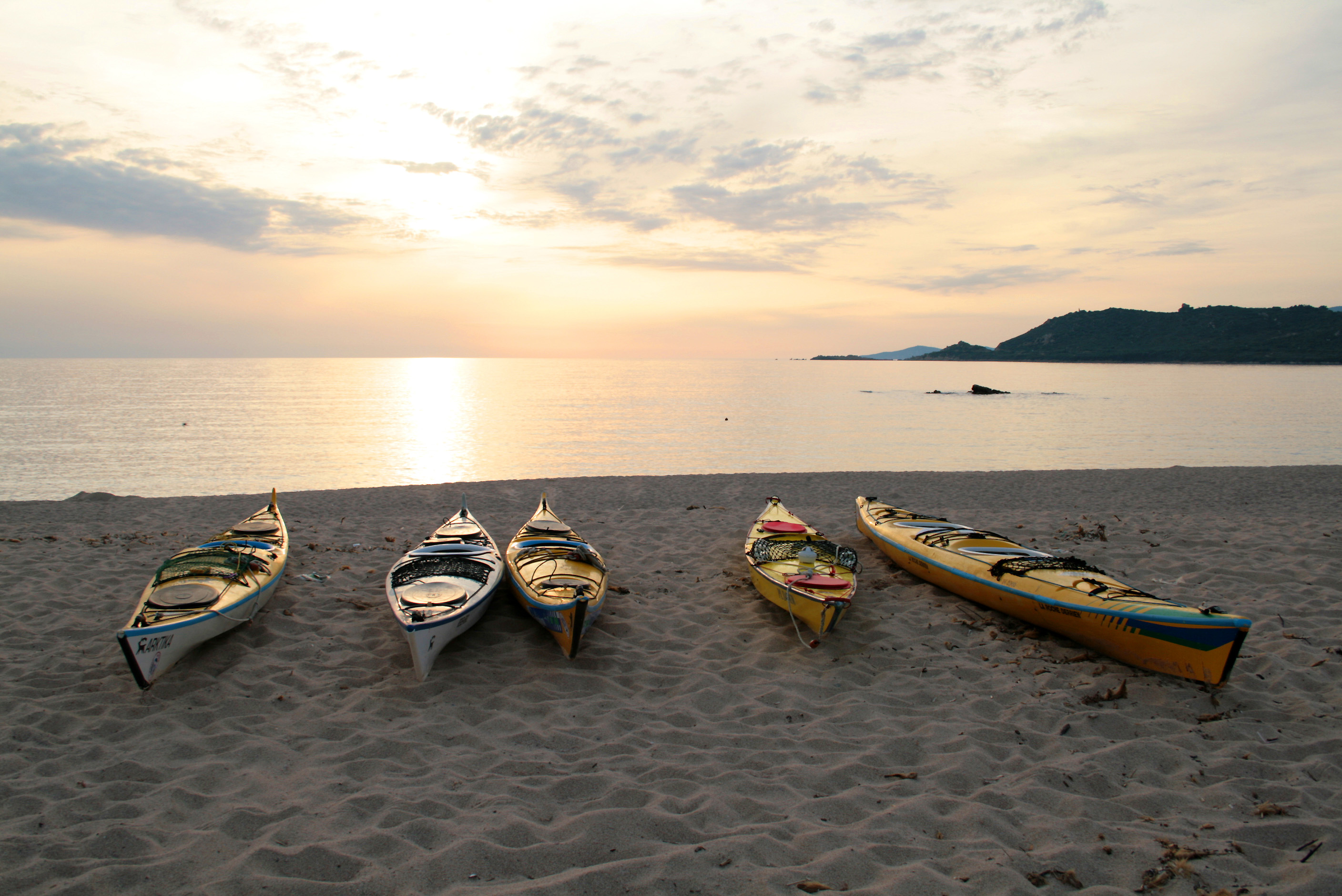
- The beachfront at Casaglione
- Location of Casaglione
- Location within France Location within Corsica
- Coordinates: 42°04′08″N 8°47′19″E
- Country: France
- Region: Corsica
- Department: Corse-du-Sud
- Arrondissement: Ajaccio
- Canton: Sevi-Sorru-Cinarca

Government
  - Mayor (2020–2026): Ours-Pierre Alfonsi
- Area^{1}: 14.73 km^{2} (5.69 sq mi)
- Elevation: 140 m (460 ft)
- Highest elevation: 412 m (1,352 ft)
- Lowest elevation: 0 m (0 ft)
- Population (2023): 571
  - Density: 38.8/km^{2} (100/sq mi)
- Time zone: UTC+01:00 (CET)
  - Summer (DST): UTC+02:00 (CEST)
- INSEE/Postal code: 2A070 /20111
- ^{1} French Land Register data, which excludes lakes, ponds, glaciers > 1 km^{2} (0.386 sq mi or 247 acres) and river estuaries.

Casaglione (Corsican: Casagliò) is a commune in the Corse-du-Sud department of France on the island of Corsica.

== Population ==
Historical population
Year	Pop.	±% p.a.
1968	206	—
1975	199	−0.49%
1982	257	+3.72%
1990	292	+1.61%
1999	292	+0.00%
2007	342	+2.00%
2012	370	+1.59%
2017	398	+1.47%
2023	571	+6.20%
Source: INSEE

== Sights ==
- Torra di Capigliolu: a Genoese tower
- Tremeca: dolmen

== See also ==
- Communes of the Corse-du-Sud department
