= Luri, Haute-Corse =

Luri
- Commune
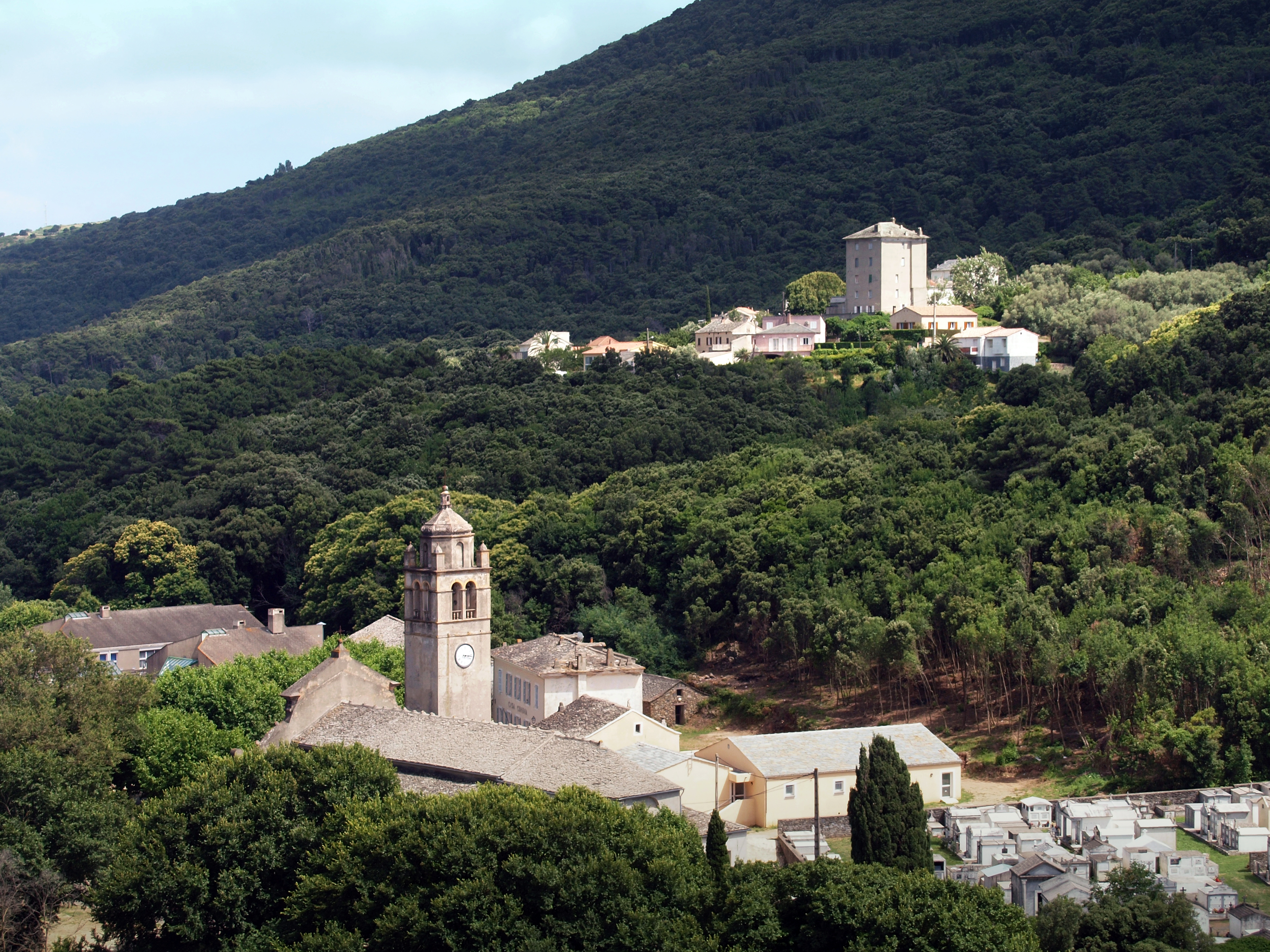
- Location of Luri
- Location within France Location within Corsica
- Coordinates: 42°53′00″N 9°28′00″E
- Country: France
- Region: Corsica
- Department: Haute-Corse
- Arrondissement: Bastia
- Canton: Cap Corse
- Intercommunality: Cap Corse

Government
  - Mayor (2020–2026): Anne-Laure Santucci
- Area^{1}: 27.53 km^{2} (10.63 sq mi)
- Elevation: 600 m (2,000 ft)
- Highest elevation: 1,136 m (3,727 ft)
- Lowest elevation: 0 m (0 ft)
- Population (2023): 872
  - Density: 31.7/km^{2} (82.0/sq mi)
- Time zone: UTC+01:00 (CET)
  - Summer (DST): UTC+02:00 (CEST)
- INSEE/Postal code: 2B152 /20228
- ^{1} French Land Register data, which excludes lakes, ponds, glaciers > 1 km^{2} (0.386 sq mi or 247 acres) and river estuaries.

Luri is a commune of the Haute-Corse department of France on the island of Corsica.

== Location ==
Luri is in the north of the Cap Corse peninsula. It is crossed from west to east by the Luri, a stream that empties into the Tyrrhenian Sea. Villages include Spergane, Luri, Campo and Santa Severa.

== History ==
Luri has been tentatively identified as the Lurinum of Ptolemy both by similarity of name and because of Castellu di Luri, a Roman-style fortification occupied from the third century BC to the 1st century AD. It was in the territory of Ptolemy's tribe, the Vanacini, who, according to a bronze inscription recording a letter from the emperor Vespasian, had their own senate and magistrates and were therefore probably semi-autonomous. They may have occupied the fort themselves.

== Population ==
Historical population
Year	Pop.	±% p.a.
1968	615	—
1975	540	−1.84%
1982	564	+0.62%
1990	671	+2.20%
1999	750	+1.24%
2007	712	−0.65%
2012	750	+1.05%
2017	835	+2.17%
2023	872	+0.73%
Source: INSEE

== See also ==
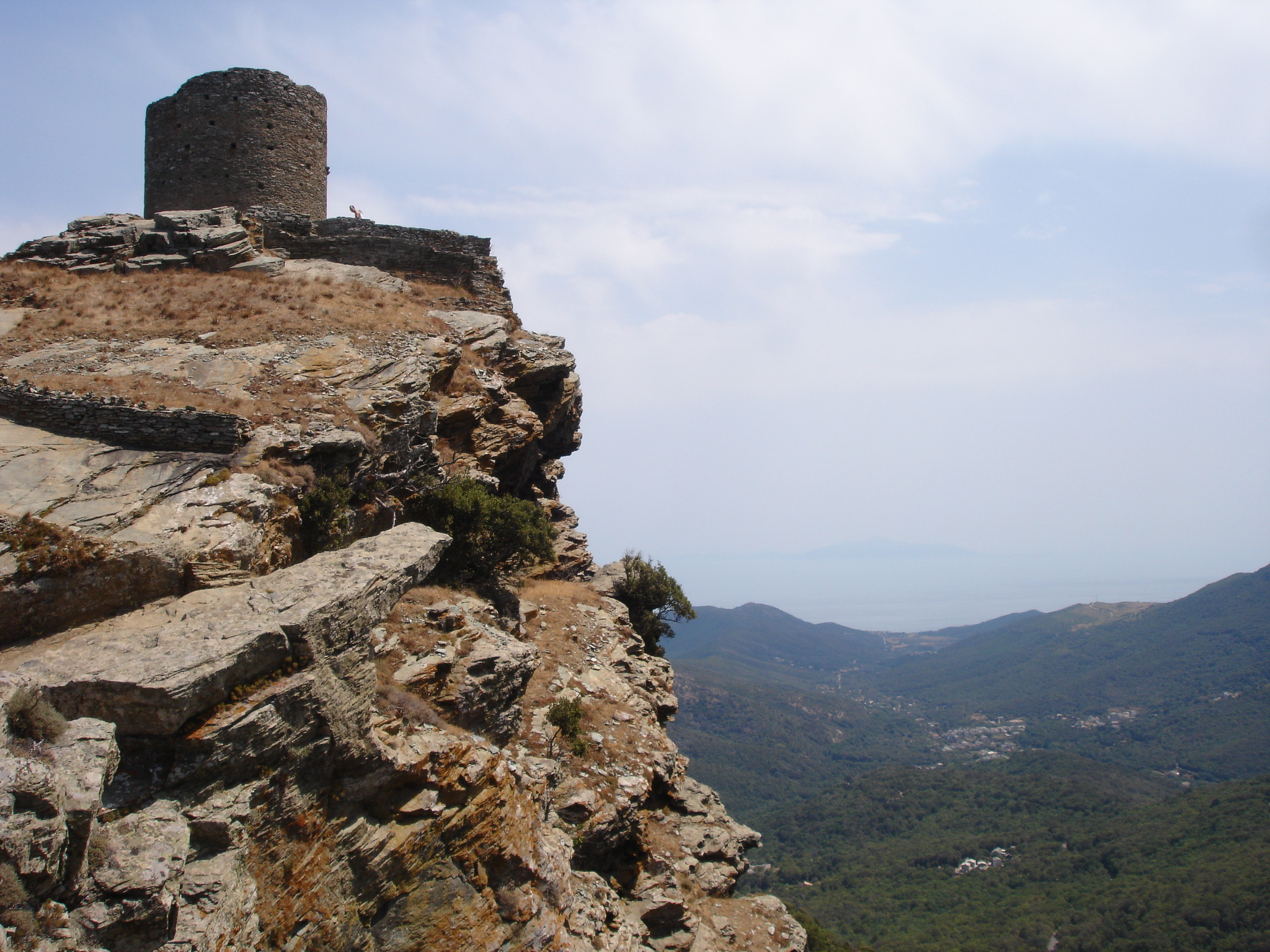
Tower of Seneca

- Tour de Sénèque
- Communes of the Haute-Corse department
