= Altagène =

Commune in Corsica, France

- Commune
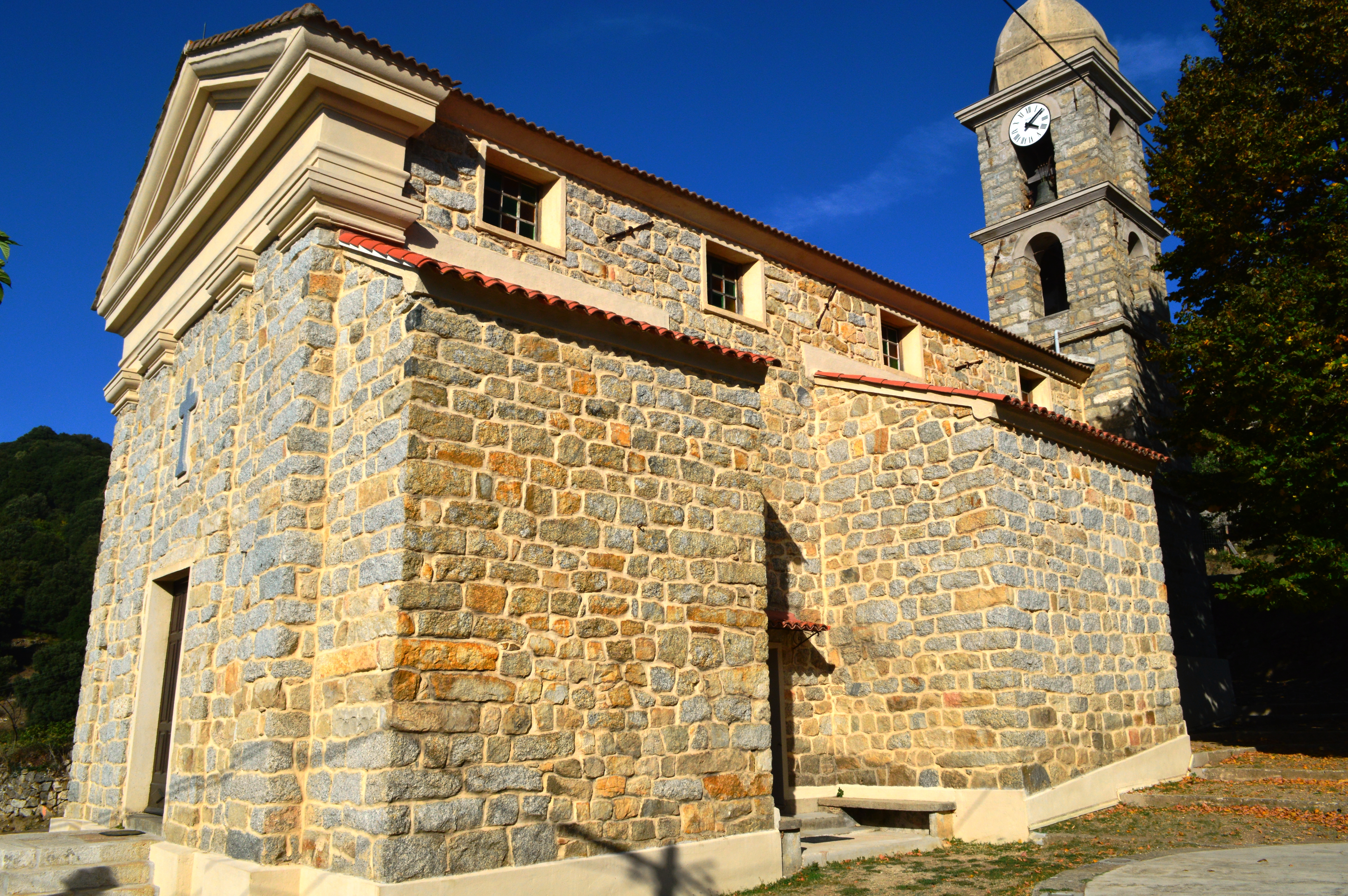
- The church of Altagène
- Location of Altagène
- Location within France Location within Corsica
- Coordinates: 41°42′26″N 9°04′14″E
- Country: France
- Region: Corsica
- Department: Corse-du-Sud
- Arrondissement: Sartène
- Canton: Sartenais-Valinco
- Intercommunality: Alta Rocca

Government
  - Mayor (2020–2026): Toussaint Simonpietri
- Area^{1}: 4.77 km^{2} (1.84 sq mi)
- Elevation: 600 m (2,000 ft)
- Highest elevation: 1,033 m (3,389 ft)
- Lowest elevation: 235 m (771 ft)
- Population (2023): 52
  - Density: 11/km^{2} (28/sq mi)
- Time zone: UTC+01:00 (CET)
  - Summer (DST): UTC+02:00 (CEST)
- INSEE/Postal code: 2A011 /20112
- ^{1} French Land Register data, which excludes lakes, ponds, glaciers > 1 km^{2} (0.386 sq mi or 247 acres) and river estuaries.

Altagène (French pronunciation: [altaʒɛn]; Corsican: Altaghjè pronounced [al.ta.ˈɟe]) is a commune in the Corse-du-Sud department in the Corsica region of France.

== Geography ==
Altagène is located some 20 km north-east of Propriano and some 25 km north-west of Porto-Vecchio in a direct line. Access to the commune is by road D49 running north from Sainte-Lucie-de-Tallano and ending in the village. The D320 also runs north from Sainte-Lucie-de-Tallano through the western part of the commune and continues to Zoza as road D20. There are some small mountain roads through the commune which is steeply sloped and heavily forested.

There are no identifiable rivers or streams nor other hamlets in the commune.

== Administration ==
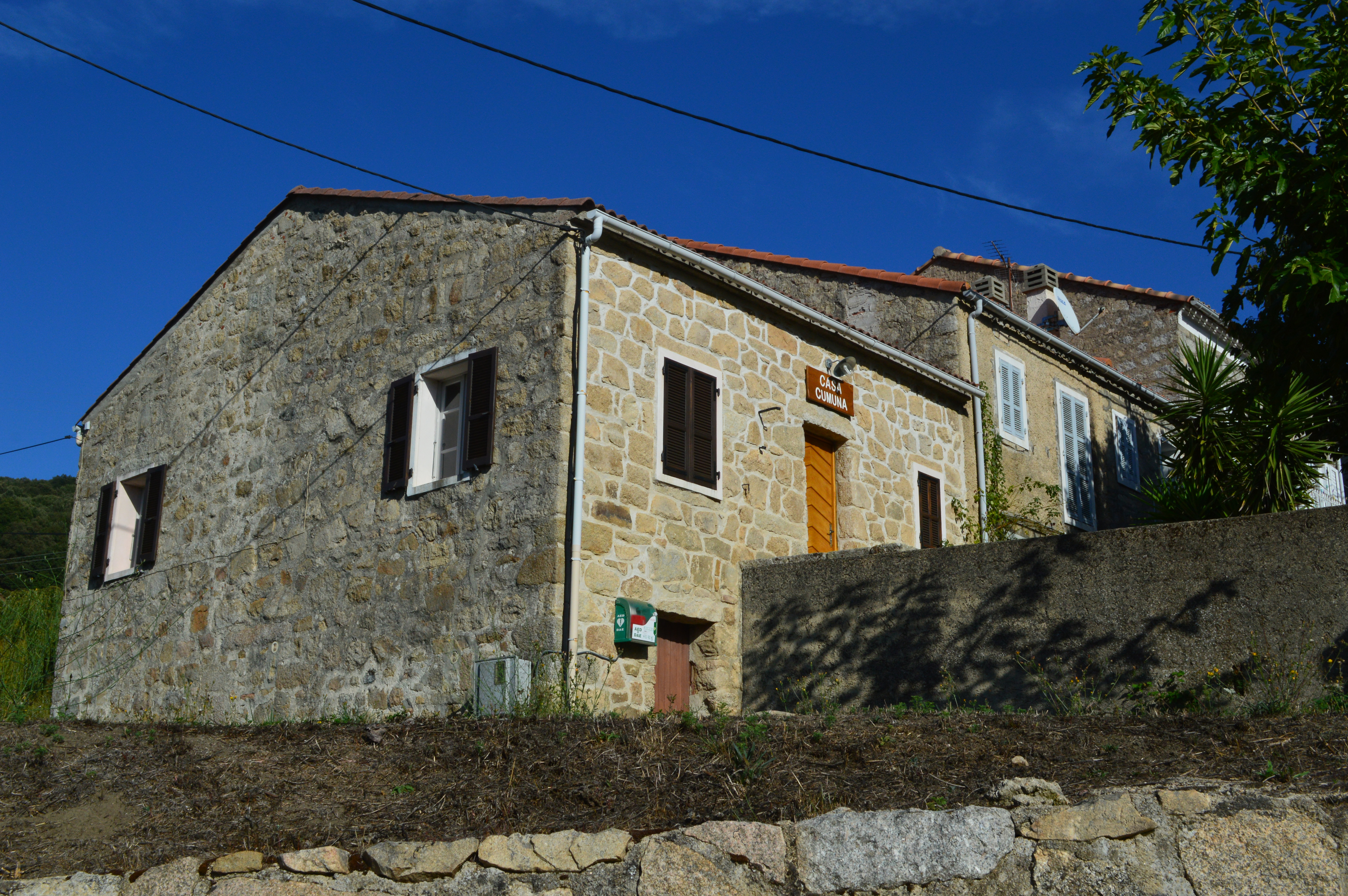
The Town Hall

List of Successive Mayors of Altagène

From	To	Name
1995	2014	François Simonpietri
2014	2026	Toussaint Simonpietri

== Demography ==
Historical population

Year	Pop.	±% p.a.
1800	138	—
1821	224	+2.33%
1846	369	+2.02%
1872	253	−1.44%
1901	319	+0.80%
1921	323	+0.06%
1936	327	+0.08%
1946	95	−11.63%
1954	106	+1.38%
1962	80	−3.46%

Year	Pop.	±% p.a.
1968	63	−3.90%
1975	56	−1.67%
1982	45	−3.08%
1990	30	−4.94%
1999	41	+3.53%
2007	50	+2.51%
2012	48	−0.81%
2017	49	+0.41%
2023	52	+1.00%

Source: EHESS and INSEE

== Culture and heritage ==
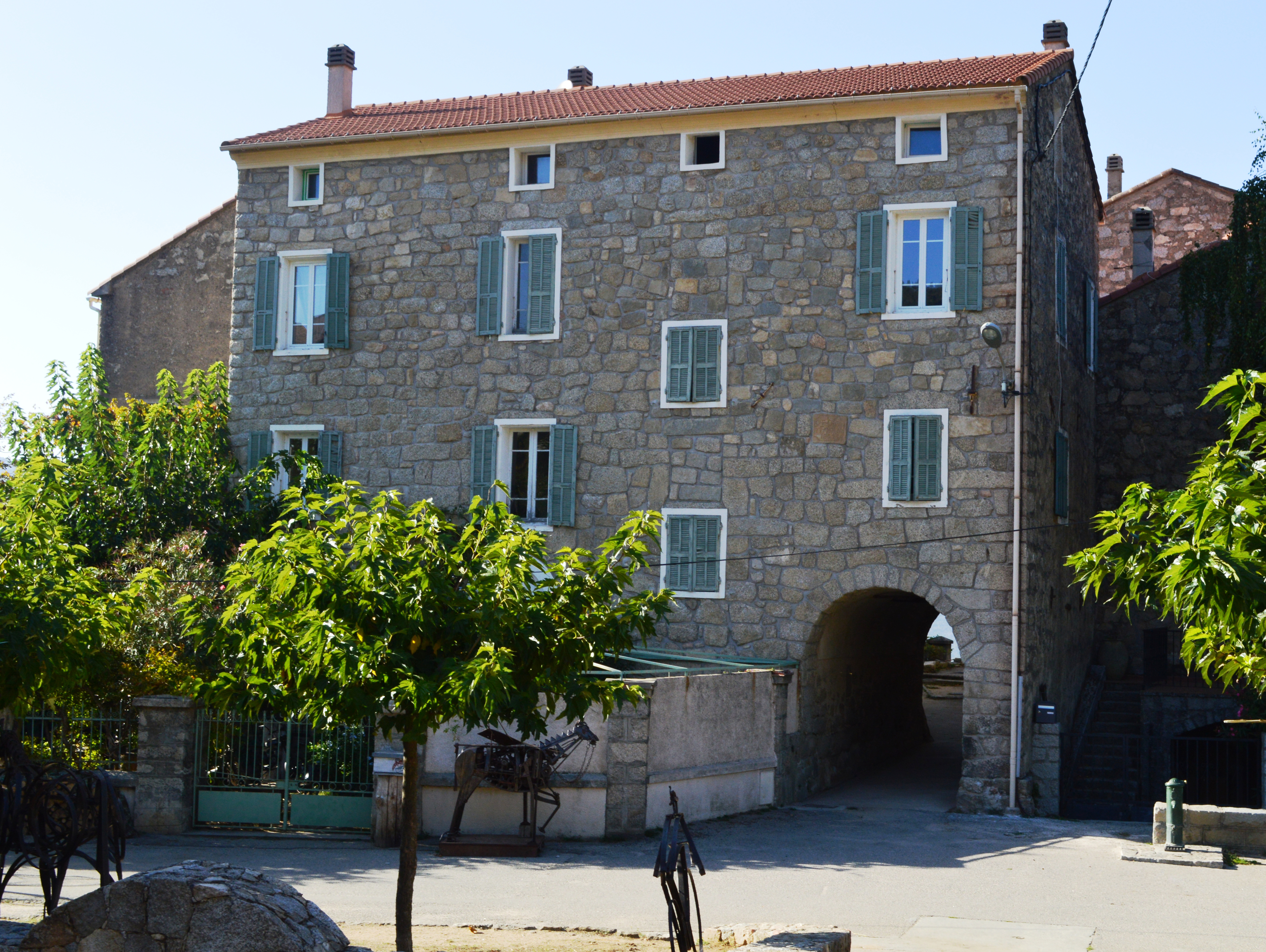
House 17

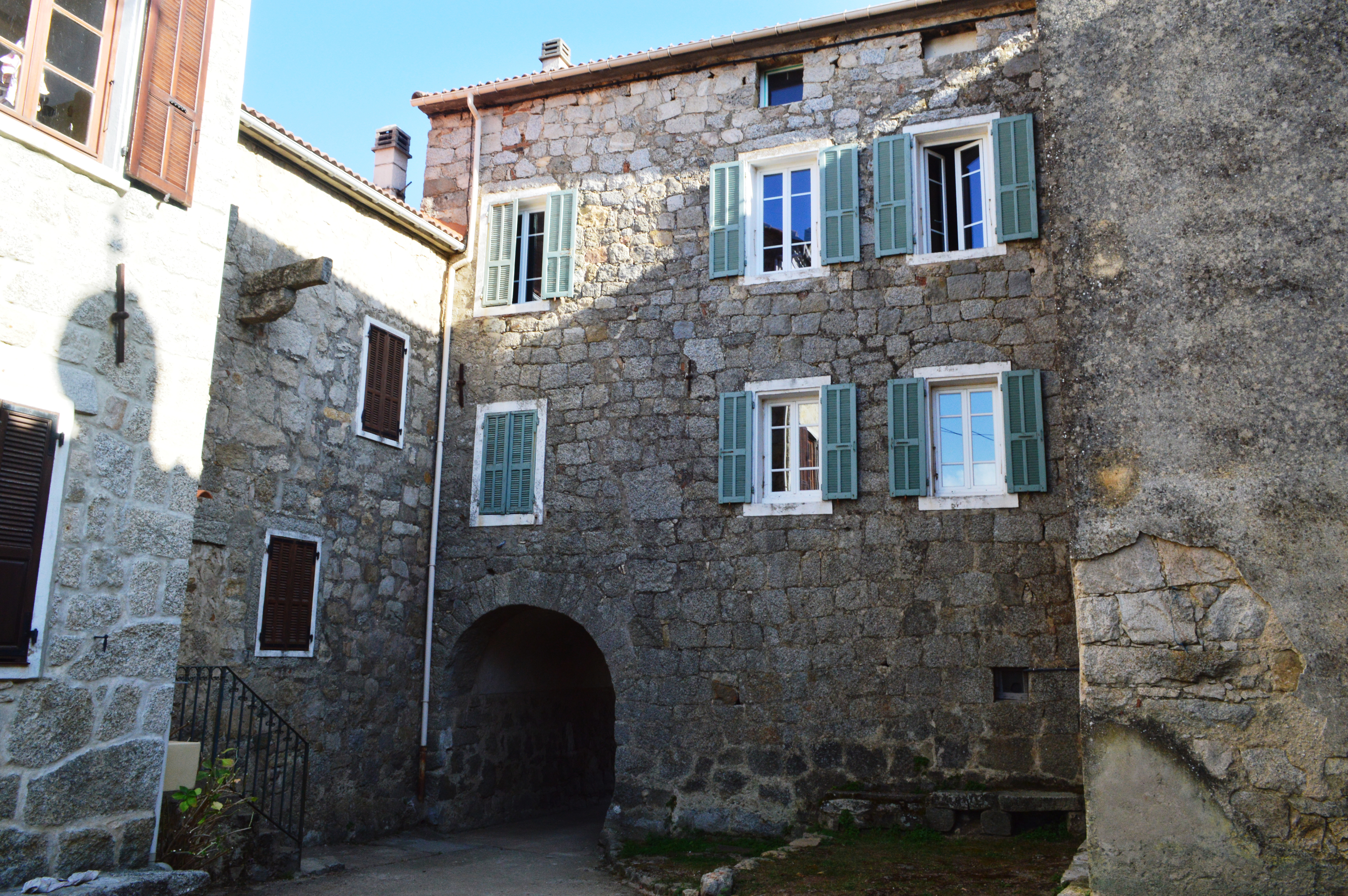
House 17 rear

=== Civil heritage ===
The commune has a number of buildings and structures that are registered as historical monuments:

- A House (12) (now the Town Hall) (18th century)
- A House (13) (1779)
- A House (15) (18th century)
- A House (17) (1804)
- A House (18) (1817)
- A House (20) (18th century)
- A House (21) (19th century)
- A House (22) (1727)
- A House (4) (1855)
- Houses (17th - 20th centuries)

=== Religious heritage ===
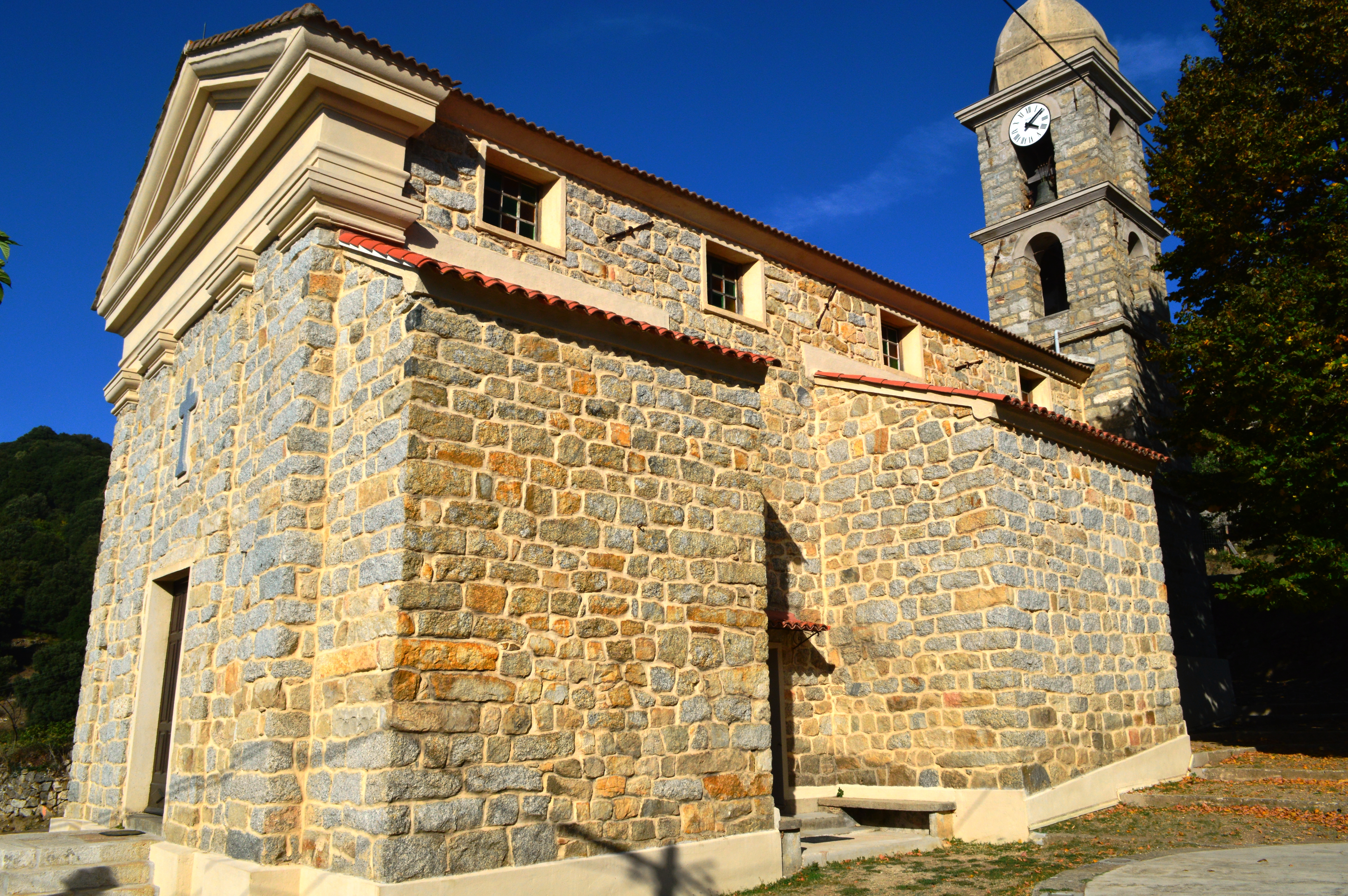
The Church of Saint Pantaléon

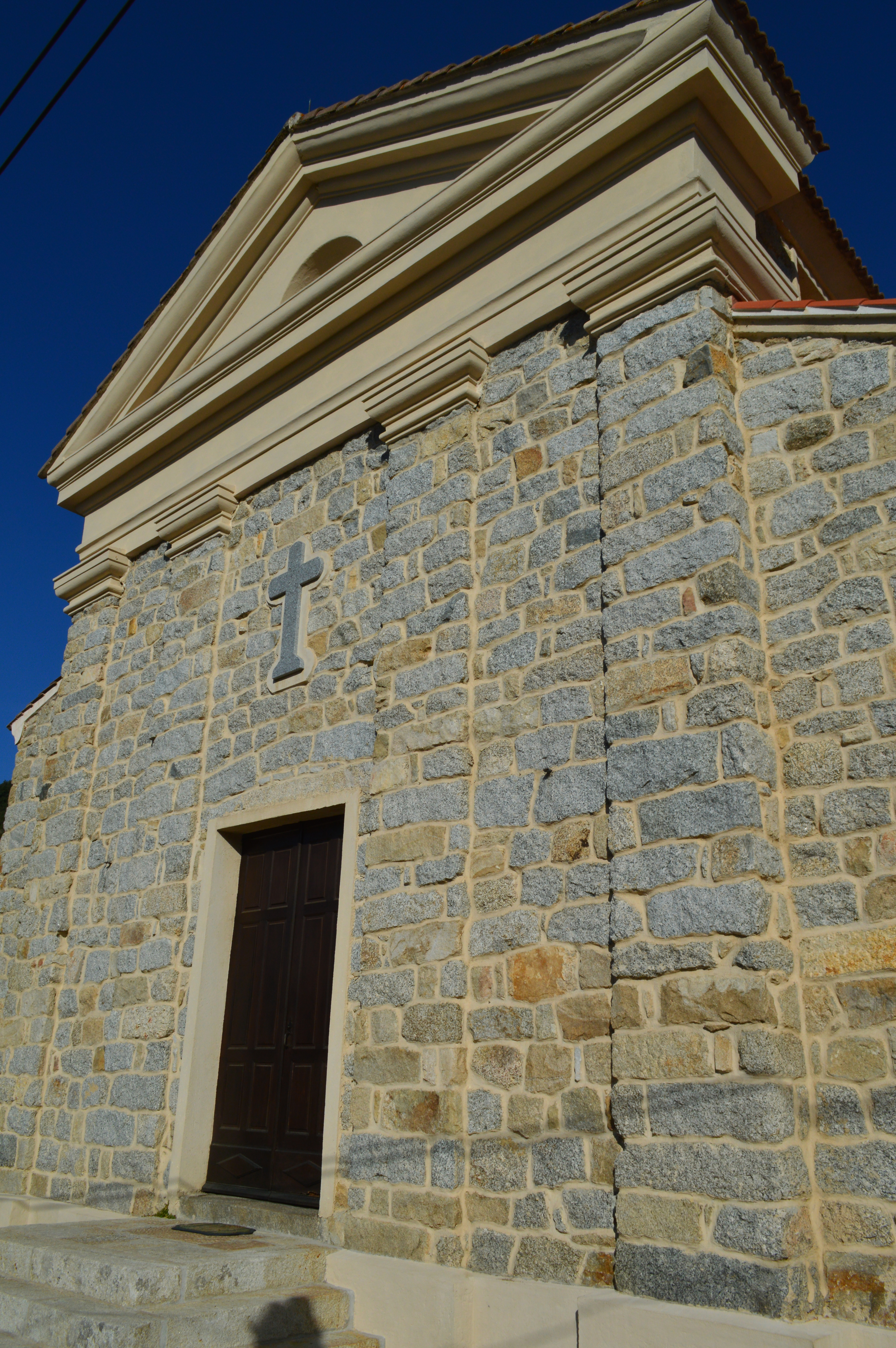
Entrance to the Church

The Parish Church of Saint Pantaléon (19th century) is registered as an historical monument.

The Church contains many items that are registered as historical objects:

- The Furniture in the Church
- An Altar Statue (19th century)
- A Processional Banner (2) (19th century)
- A Processional Banner (1) (19th century)
- A Body Purse, Chasuble, Stole, Maniple, and Humeral Veil (19th century)
- A Sunburst Monstrance (19th century)
- A Ciborium (19th century)
- A Chalice with Paten (19th century)
- A Statue: Christ on the Cross (19th century)
- A Statue: Saint Pantaléon (19th century)
- A Statue: Virgin and Child (19th century)
- A Statue: Saint Blaise (19th century)
- A Painting: Apparition of the Virgin to Saint Blaise and Saint Pantaléon (18th century)

=== Altagène Photo Gallery ===
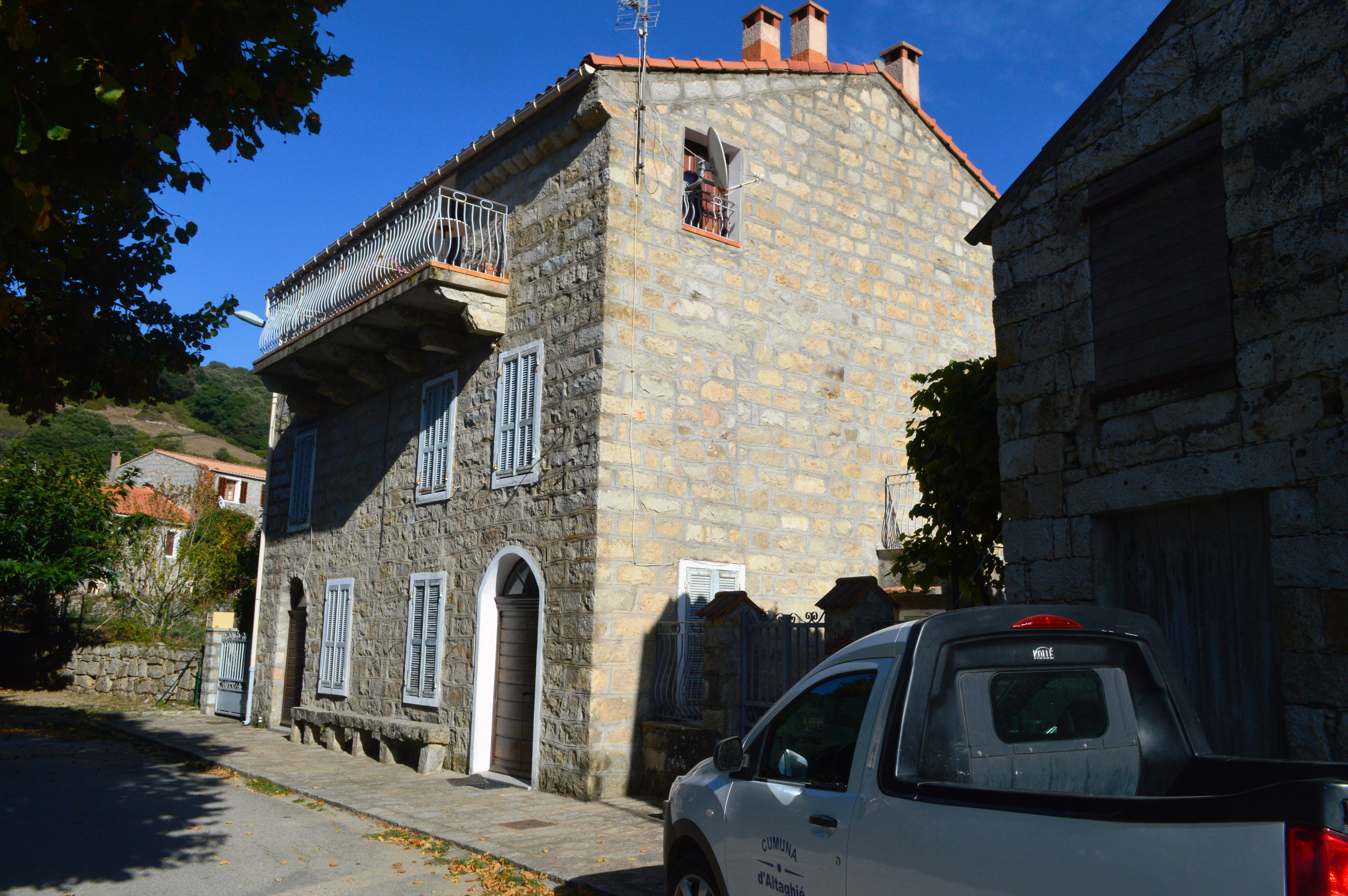
A House in Altagène

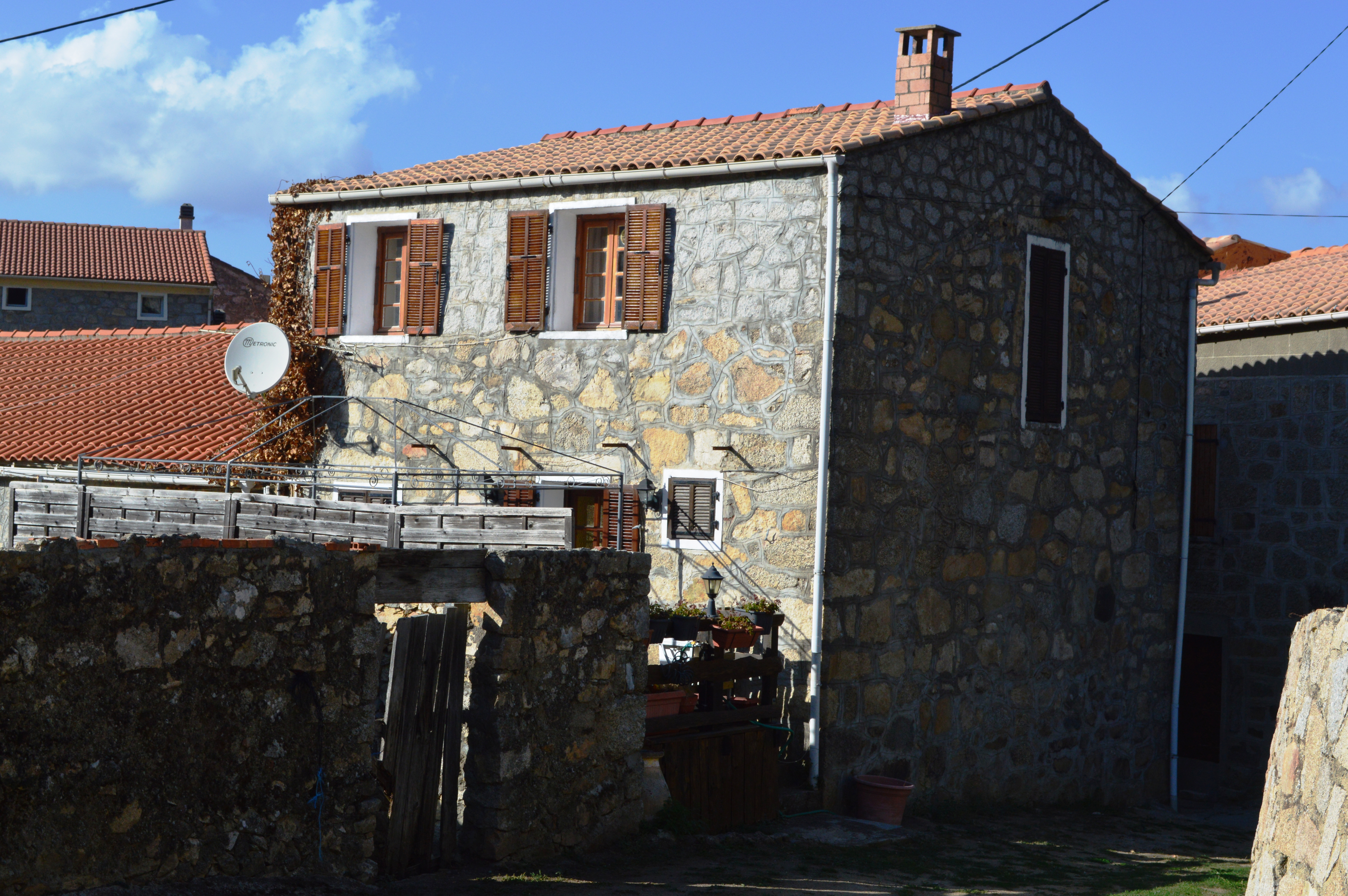
A House in Altagène

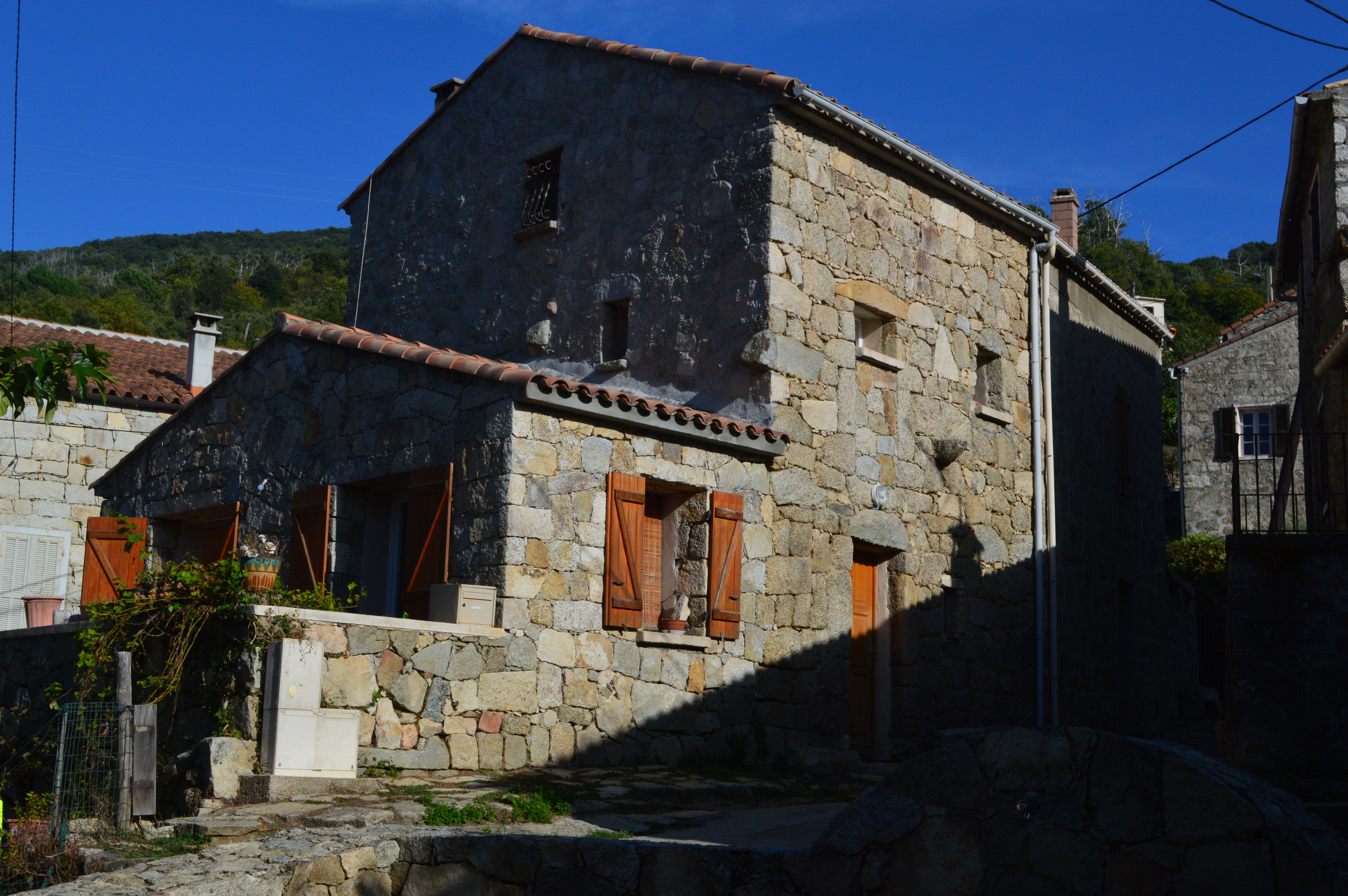
A House in Altagène

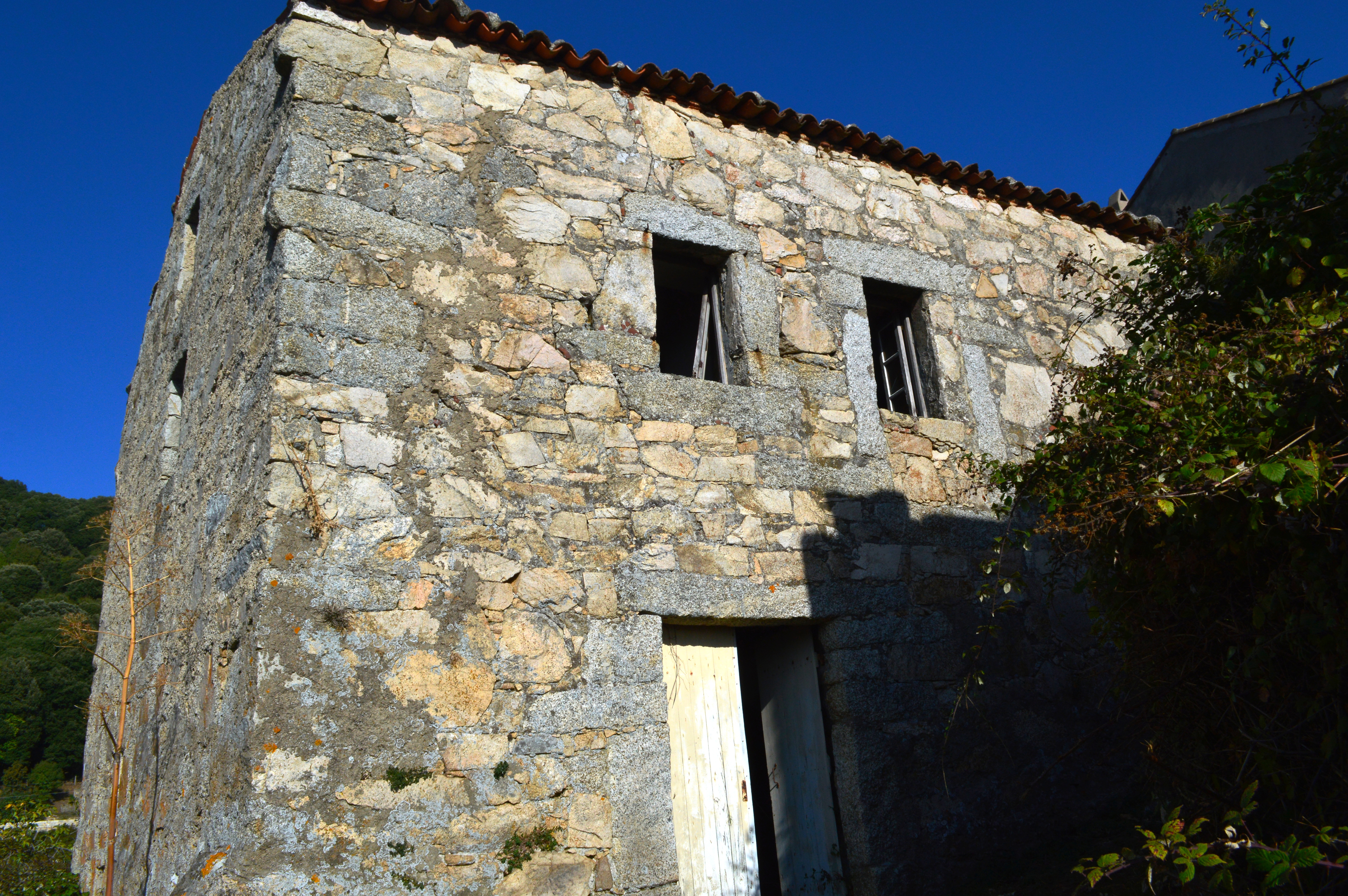
A House in Altagène

== See also ==
- Communes of the Corse-du-Sud department
