= Altiani =

- Commune
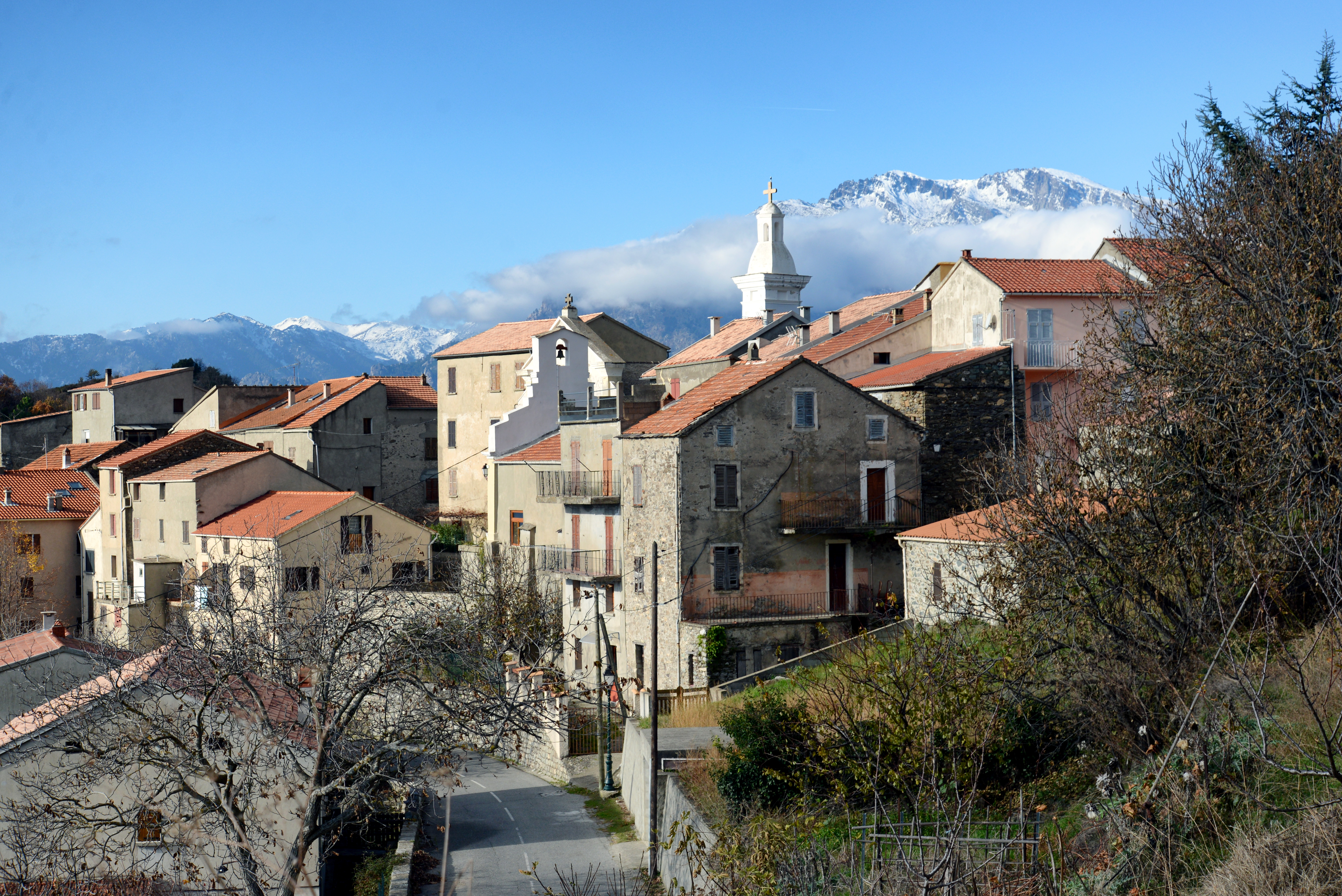
- Altiani village, with Monte Cardo in the background
- Location of Altiani
- Location within France Location within Corsica
- Coordinates: 42°14′17″N 9°17′31″E
- Country: France
- Region: Corsica
- Department: Haute-Corse
- Arrondissement: Corte
- Canton: Ghisonaccia

Government
  - Mayor (2020–2026): Jean-Yves Bussetta
- Area^{1}: 18.29 km^{2} (7.06 sq mi)
- Elevation: 618 m (2,028 ft)
- Highest elevation: 1,192 m (3,911 ft)
- Lowest elevation: 159 m (522 ft)
- Population (2023): 53
  - Density: 2.9/km^{2} (7.5/sq mi)
- Time zone: UTC+01:00 (CET)
  - Summer (DST): UTC+02:00 (CEST)
- INSEE/Postal code: 2B012 /20270
- ^{1} French Land Register data, which excludes lakes, ponds, glaciers > 1 km^{2} (0.386 sq mi or 247 acres) and river estuaries.

Altiani (French pronunciation: [altjani]) is a commune in the Haute-Corse department of France on the island of Corsica.

== Geography ==
=== Location ===
Altiani is a commune in the Rogna in Quà microregion consists of cliff villages in the valley of Tavignano. The village overlooks both the plain of Aleria and Corte as well as Venaco and therefore enjoys an extensive panorama over central the mountain chain as well as the Tyrrhenian Sea.

=== Relief ===
The commune covers 1,829 hectares in the lower Tavignano valley. The river flows through its territory for 5 km before joining the Vecchio downstream in the Gasprese area. 300 metres upstream of the Genovese bridge on the N200 highway, the river is fed by the Limone stream whose source is under the Punta di Mangaio (1030 m - Sant'Andréa-di-Bozio). For 8.2 km it crosses the communes of Sant'Andréa-di-Bozio, Focicchia, Erbajolo, and Altiani. This stream is itself fed by the stream of Pietre Bianche which joins 685 metres north of the village. The pattern formed by the streams follows the ridgeline up to Punta Cervio, defining the border between Focicchia and Altiani. Altiani is separated from Piedicorte-di-Gaggio by a north–south line following the Caselle stream which flows between the Altiani Mountain and Monte Rosso (Piedicorte-di-Gaggio) continuing along a ridgeline towards Tavignano, joining the river about 500 m before the confluence of the Cavelle stream and spiking south along a ridge line towards the confluence with Casaloria Creek (a tributary of Tavignano) and the Coina stream. Punta Muracinto (645 m - Rospigliani) marks the southeast end of the commune. In the West, the boundaries of the commune with those of Noceta and Venaco are those of the Regional Natural Park of Corsica.

The highest point of the commune is Punta Cervio (1,189 metres), Mount "à cheval" (straddling) both Focicchia, Piedicorte-di-Gaggio, and Altiani. It is located in the north-east part of the commune in the part calledthe Mountain of Altiani.

=== Climate and vegetation ===
The left bank of Tavignanu consists of bare rocky soil covered with sparse vegetation, sparse scrub with some cork oaks. In summer this scrub is brown, dry, and ready to ignite. Fires are quite common in this valley. In contrast, the right side of the river is green, covered with a thick high maquis and overrun with pine trees, oaks, and cork oaks.

=== Access roads and transport ===
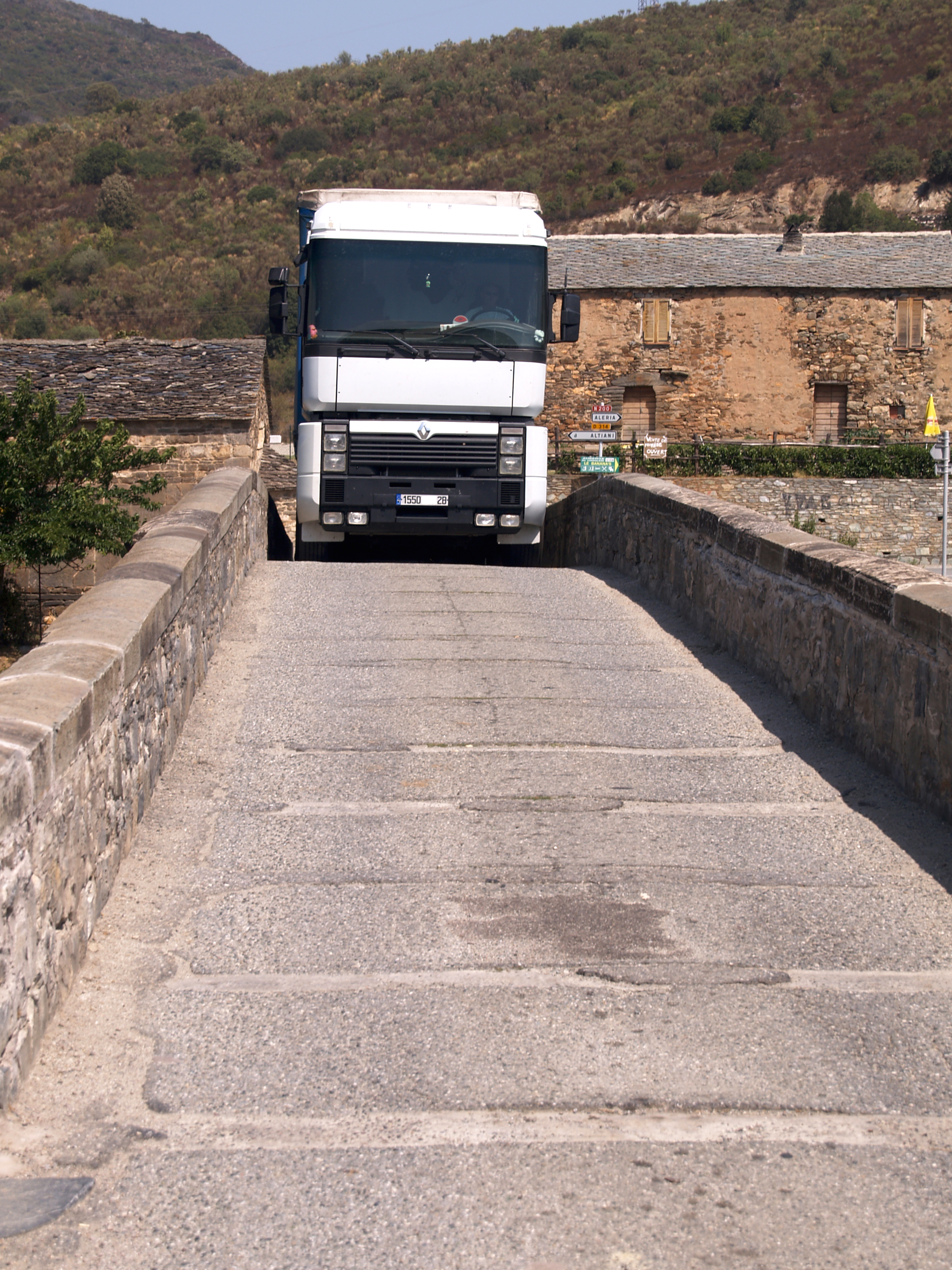
Truck crossing the Genovese bridge

The commune is traversed by the RN200 highway along the Tavignano valley until Ajuinta Bridge (201 m) to a place called Gasprese (160 m). A feature of this road is to have two single lane bridges on the route from Corte to the sea at Aleria: the Ajuinta bridge and the Genovese bridge, both of which are in the Altiani commune. The Genovese Bridge is particularly noteworthy and is classified as a historical monument. As a backup a new bridge was built 50 m downstream. The new bridge on National Highway 200 was opened to traffic on 11 July 2011. It is 115 metres long with a central arch of 115 metres.

The village of Altiani is the junction of the D14 and D314 roads, the latter doubling partly for the RN200 on the heights in serving the villages of the Rogna Quà micro-region: Erbajolo, Focicchia, Altiani, Piedicorte-di-Gaggio, Pietraserena, and Pancheraccia from Favalello.

The most used road is the D314 which makes the village 8 km from the RN 200.

=== Urbanization ===
The village is built on a rocky outcrop along the D314 road that winds through terraced houses between 560 and 640 metres above the valley of Tavignano.

Although old, the buildings are renovated and grouped around the white church of St. Mary. Houses with stone walls are rare and the roofs are covered with red tiles. The population all live in the village as there are no hamlets.

== History ==
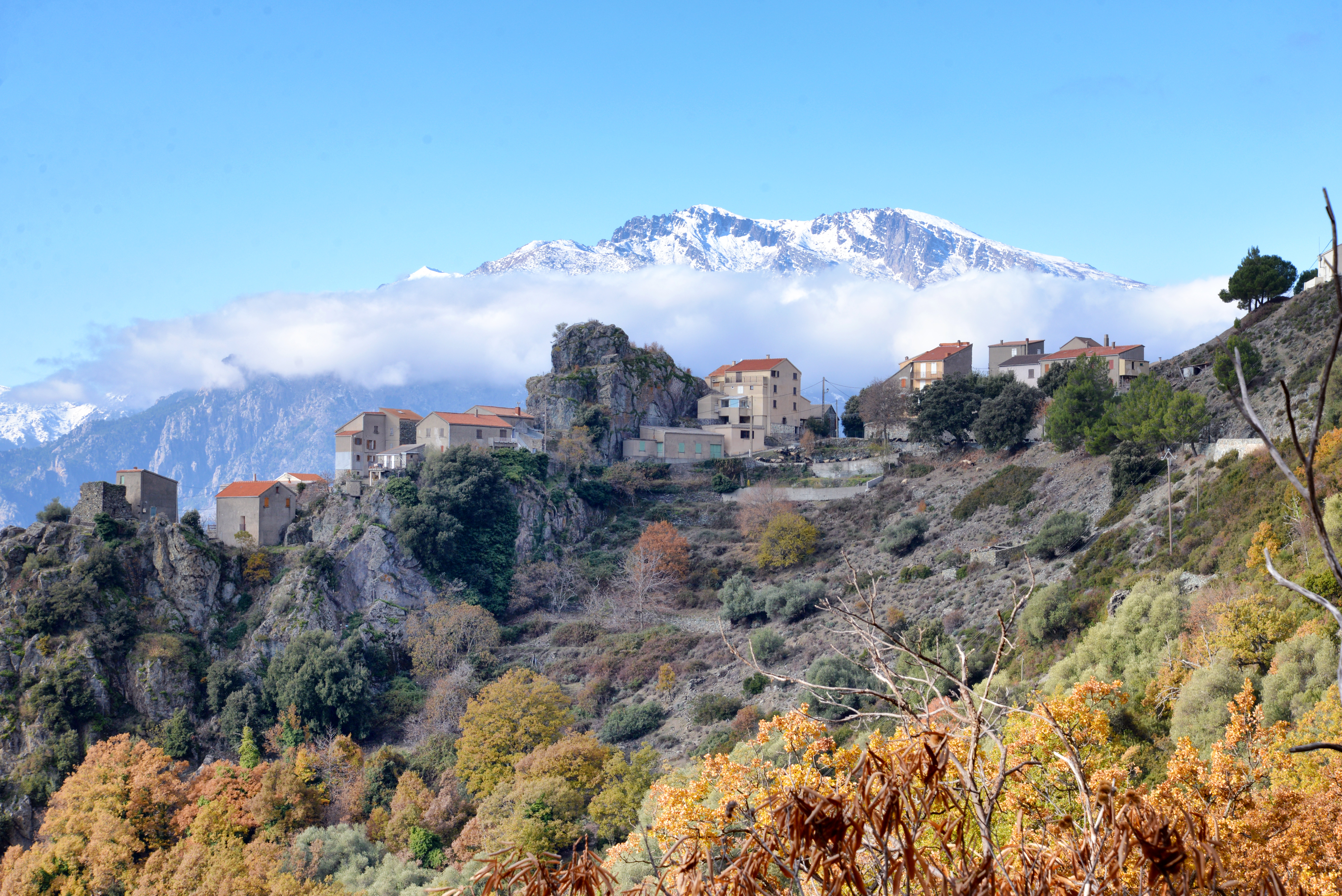
The village and the Massif of Monte Cardo

=== Modern times ===
Around 1520 the community of Santa Maria d'Altiani was part of the Pieve of Rogna in Quà which fell within the bishopric of Aleria. The Pieve of Rogna had about 4,250 inhabitants and its populated places were: Vivario (li Gati, le Murachiole, Arche) Herbajolo, la Valle di Sera, la Fosigia la Lamella, Altiani, lo Petragio, lo Pè di Corte, lo Lunello, Porra, lo Piano Buono, la Petra Serena, Santa Maria de Talsini, Corte, Omessa, Santa Lutia, Tralunca, lo Soarello, and Castirla.

In the 18th century part of the Pieve of Rogna was redistributed and took the name of Tavignano. In 1790 it became the canton of Piedicorte-di-Gaggio until its merger with San Lorenzo and Sermano.

Monseigneur Carlo Fabrizio Giustiniano, bishop of Mariana in the 1680s, described the region as follows:

"In this Pieve beyond the river there is the country of Vivario which contains Gatti, Muracciole, and Arca and beyond Vivario there are Noceta, Rospigliani and Antisanti. These are the pieves and villages of the first part of this country located beyond the Tavignano, a river which, as it approaches the sea, changes its name and is called by many the Aleria river .... The Pieve of Rogna we have spoken contains below the river (Tavignano) the following villages: Erbajolo, la Valle di Sera, Focicchia, la Lamella (la Mela), and Altiani where there is a convent of the Friars Minor, lo Petragio, Piedicorte di Gaggio, lo Lunello, Porra, lo Piano Buono, Pietraserena, Pancheraccia, Giuncaggio, and Carco; and this Pieve is densely populated and produces an abundance of corn, wine, oil, cattle, honey and fruit."

=== Contemporary Era ===
In 1954, the canton of Piedicorte-di-Gaggio was composed of the communes of: Altiani, Erbajolo, Focicchia, Giuncaggio, Pancheraccia, Piedicorte-di-Gaggio, and Pietraserena. Altiani then had 347 inhabitants.

From 1971 to 1973 new districts were created including the Canton of Bustanico which was created from the mergers imposed on the old cantons of Piedicorti-di-Gaggio, San Lurenzo, and Sermano.

== Economy ==
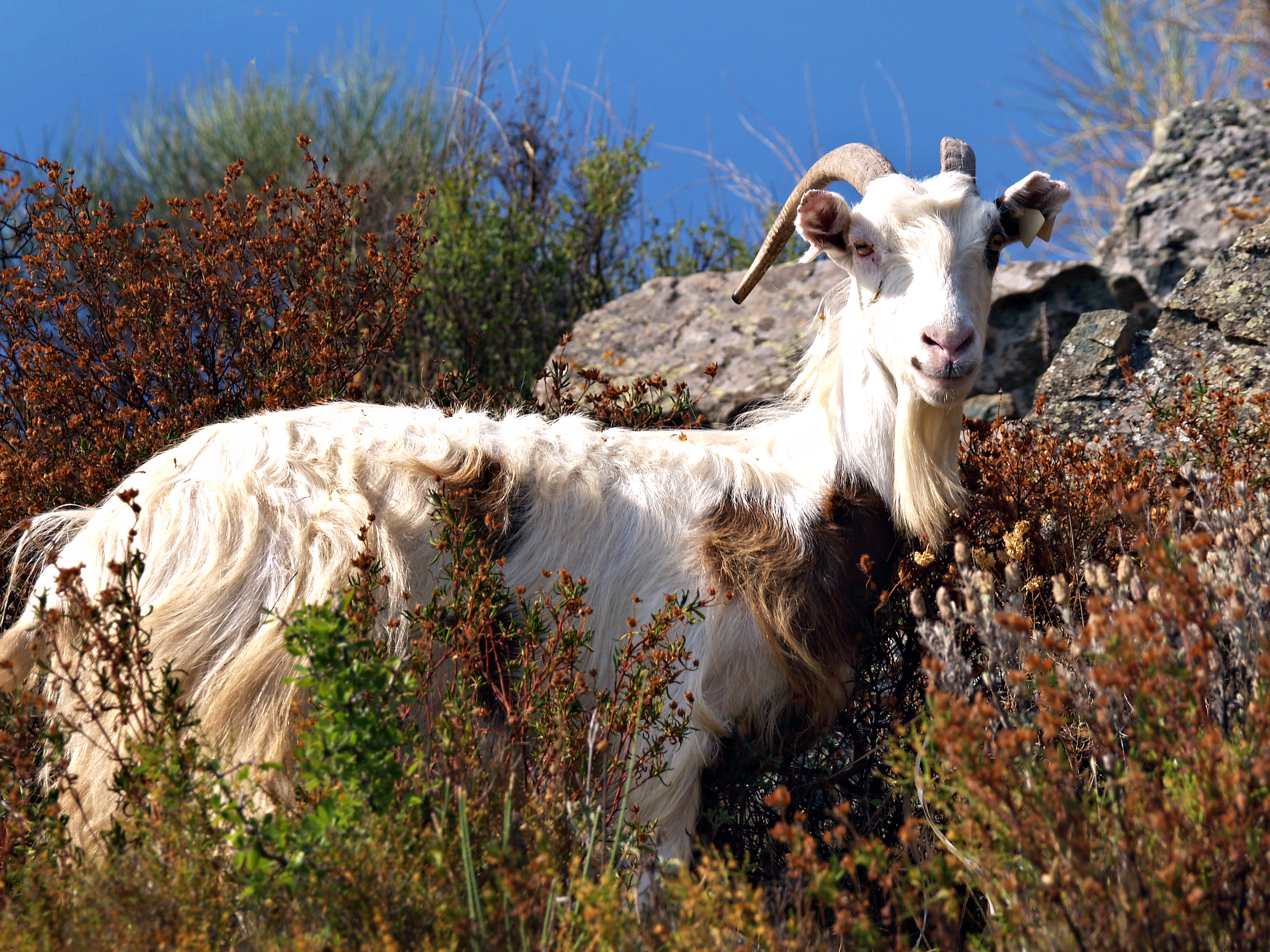
A goat in the maquis

The town derives its resources from agro-pastoral farming of which livestock breeding is the main activity.

An experimental breeding station managed by the Office of Agriculture and Rural Development of Corsica (ODARC) has been implemented near the Genovese bridge on the RN200 highway at a place called Ponte. This was an initiative of the Society of Economics for mixed development of Corsica (SOMIVAC). To carry out its tasks, the resort has a herd of 220 adult ewes, 50 lambs for stock renewal and six rams.

The station is open to further research. Recently a breeding apiary was installed and a selection of bees is managed by the "AOC Corsican Honey".

== Administration ==
List of Successive Mayors of Altiani

From	To	Name	Party	Position
2001	2001	Joseph Campana	DVG	Former General Councilor
2001	2010	Marius Luciani		
2011	2020	Pierre-Paul Frigosini		
2020	2026	Jean-Yves Bussetta		

== Demography ==
Historical population

Year	Pop.	±% p.a.
1800	351	—
1821	209	−2.44%
1846	484	+3.42%
1872	646	+1.12%
1901	690	+0.23%
1926	469	−1.53%
1946	321	−1.88%
1954	347	+0.98%
1962	148	−10.10%

Year	Pop.	±% p.a.
1968	126	−2.65%
1975	126	+0.00%
1982	100	−3.25%
1990	90	−1.31%
1999	95	+0.60%
2007	103	+1.02%
2012	61	−9.95%
2017	48	−4.68%
2023	53	+1.67%

Source: EHESS and INSEE

== Culture and heritage ==
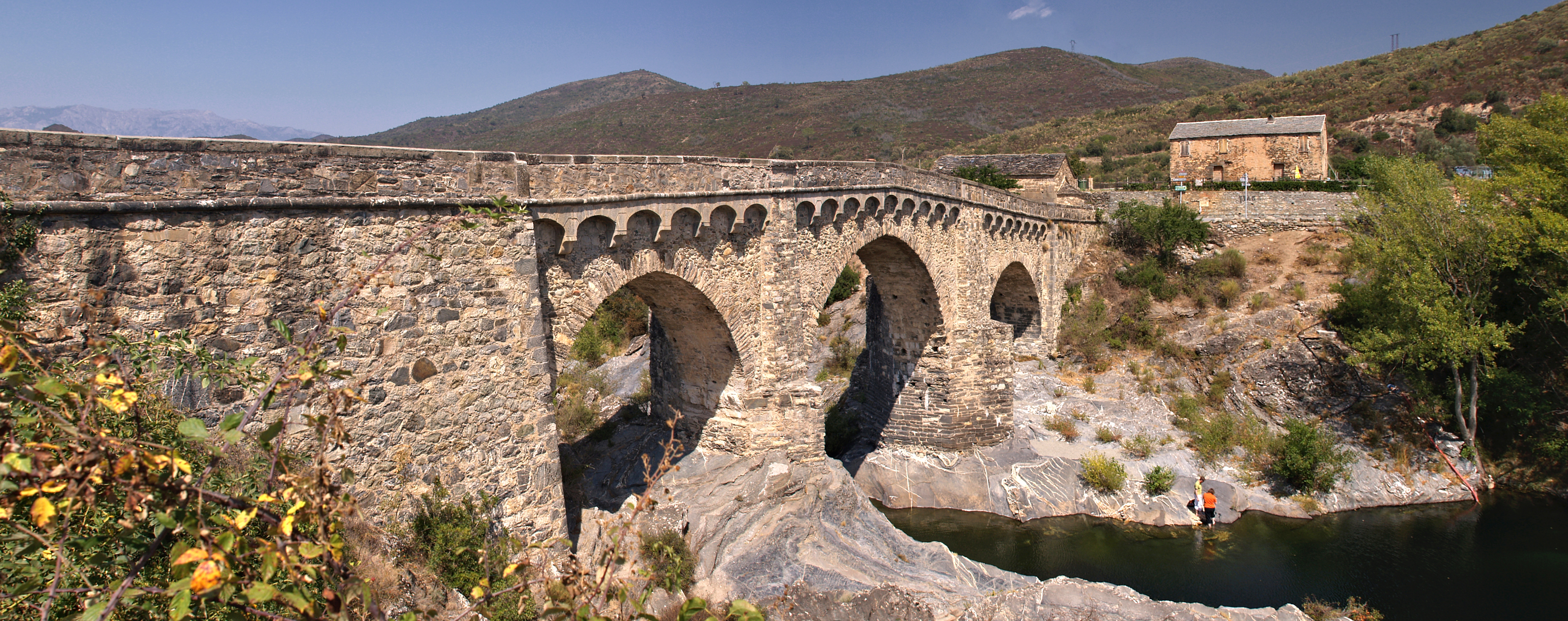
The Genovese bridge

=== Civil heritage ===
- The Pont'à u large called in the commune the Pont d'Altiani is a Genovese bridge with three arches from the 14th century over the Tavignano. With its typical architecture in the Louis XVI style, the bridge dates to the enlargement made by the steward Boucheporn. The property of the department, it is registered as an historical monument by an order dated 14 January 1977. The bridge was used for traffic until recently and is located on the N200 highway. With only one lane it caused congestion with traffic alternating direction without traffic lights. It slowly deteriorated with traffic becoming more intense but now is no longer used for traffic. A new bridge was commissioned on 11 July 2011 to replace it downstream.

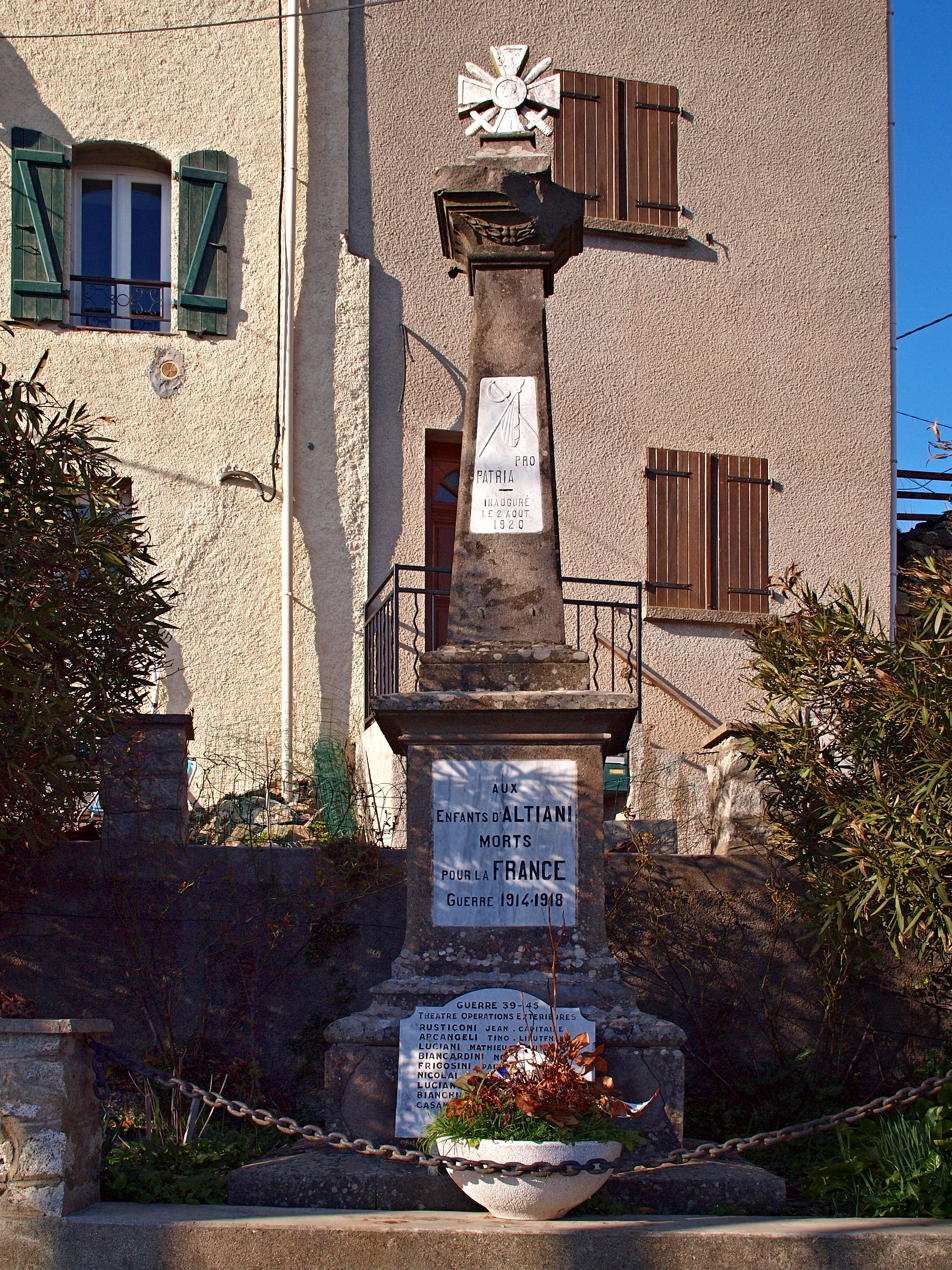
War Memorial

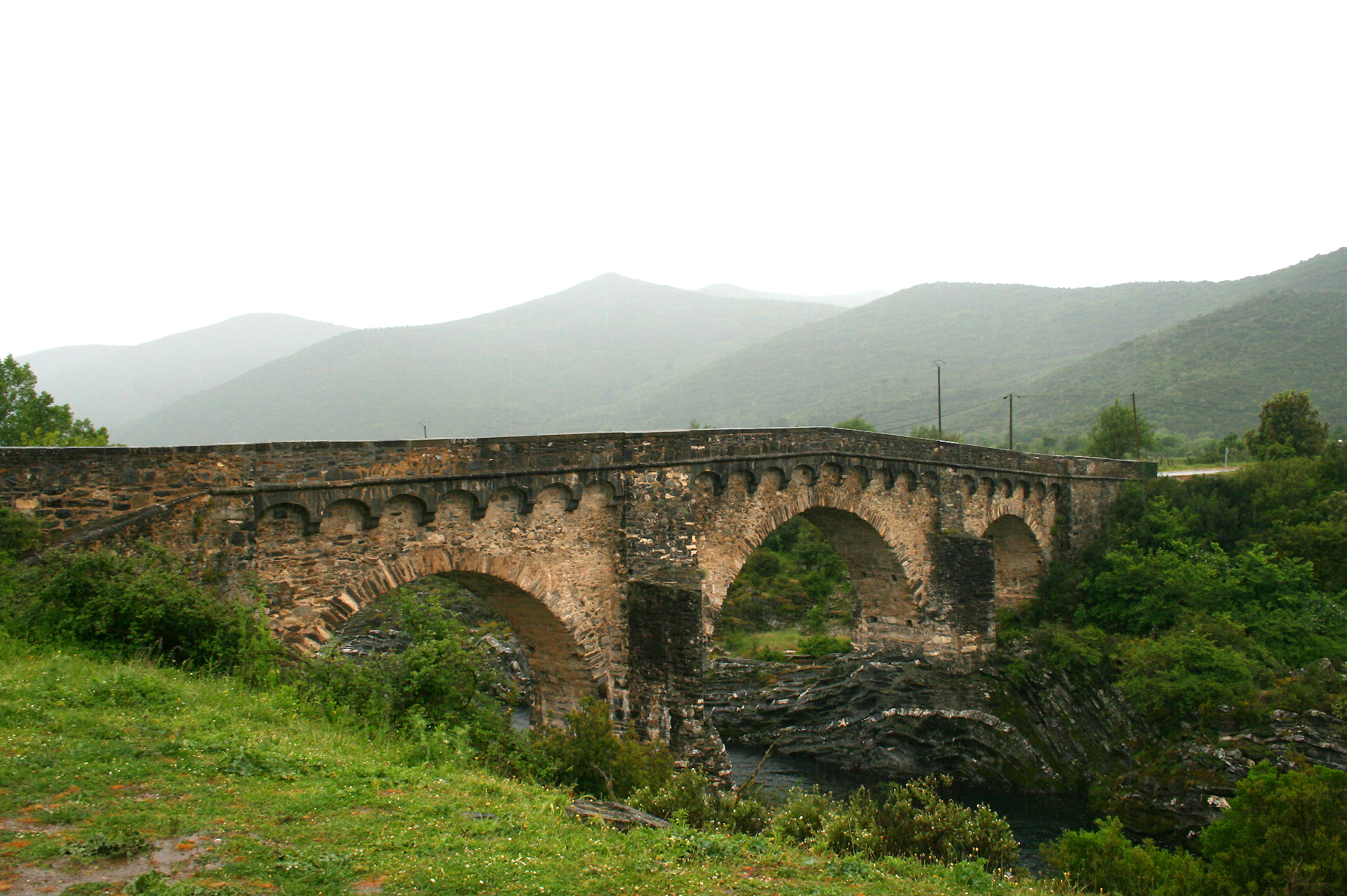
Genovese bridge at Altiani

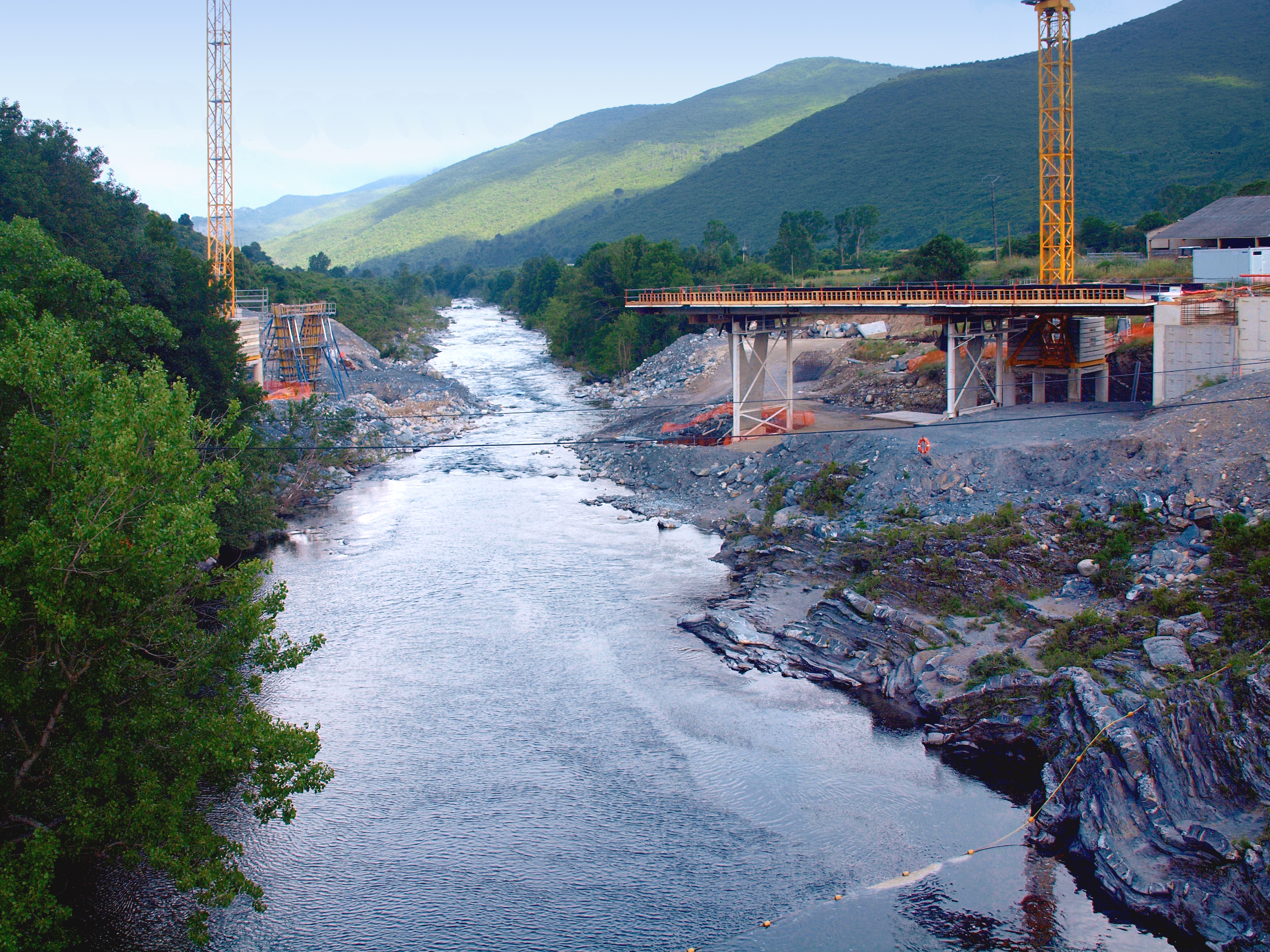
The new bridge under construction (2010)

Other sites of interest

- The War Memorial
- The ruined Lutriani Mill on the right bank of the Tavignano

=== Religious Heritage ===
- The Chapel of San Giovanni (Saint John the Baptist) (10th century) is a disused Romanesque structure of the 10th and 11th century near the Genovese bridge at the junction of Highways N200 and D314. Owned by the commune it is registered as an historical monument.
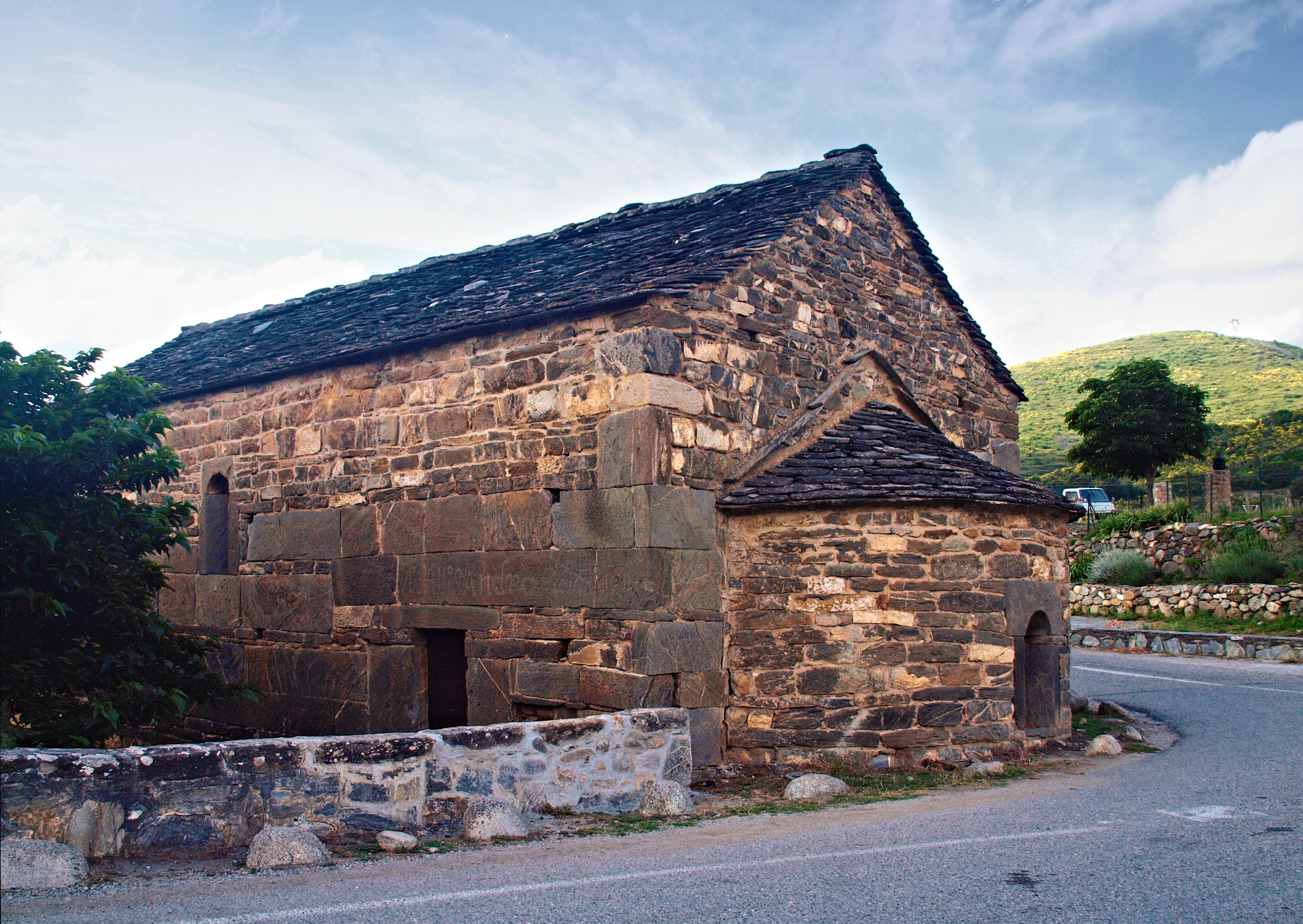
Chapel of San Giovanni

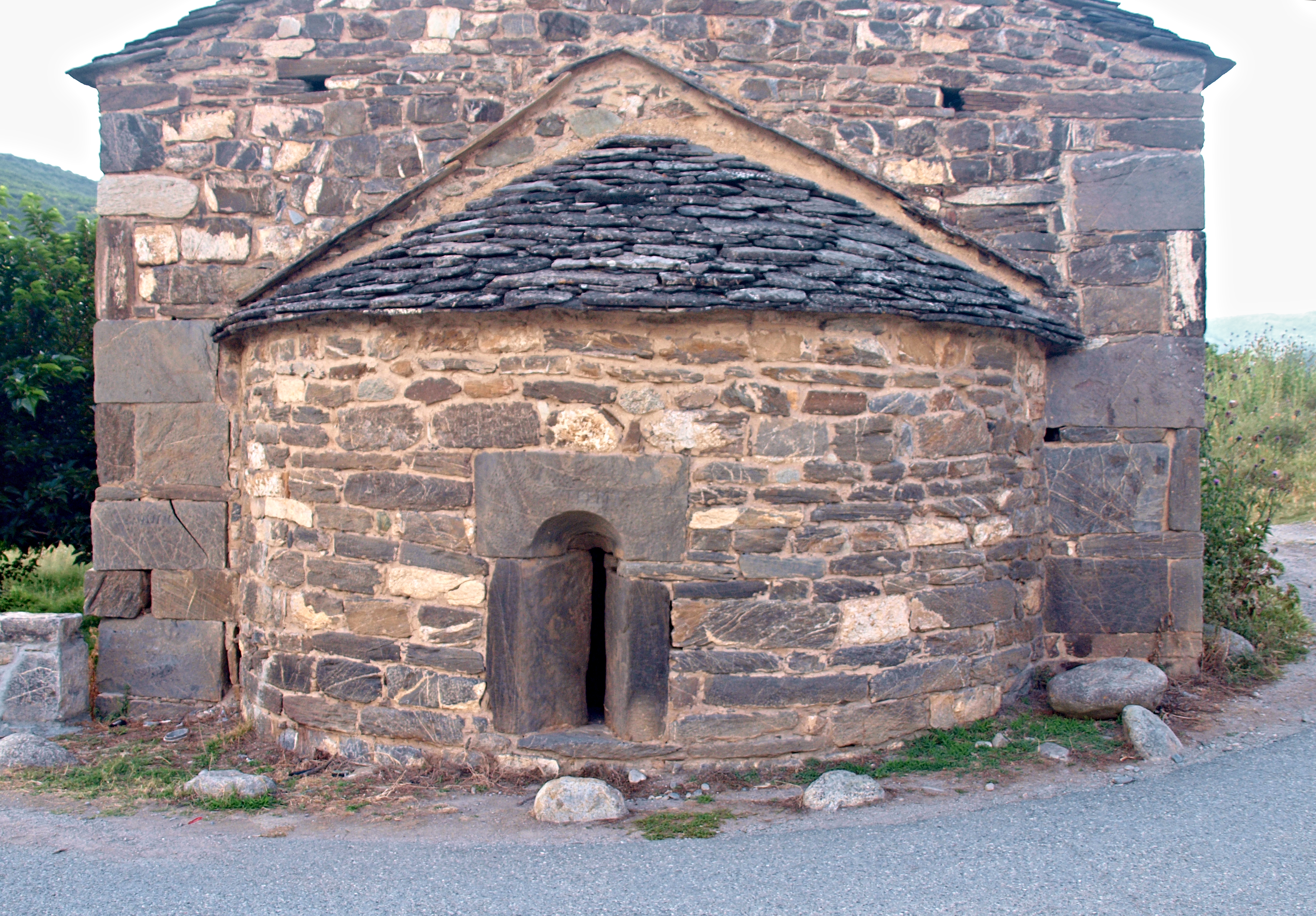
Chevet of the chapel

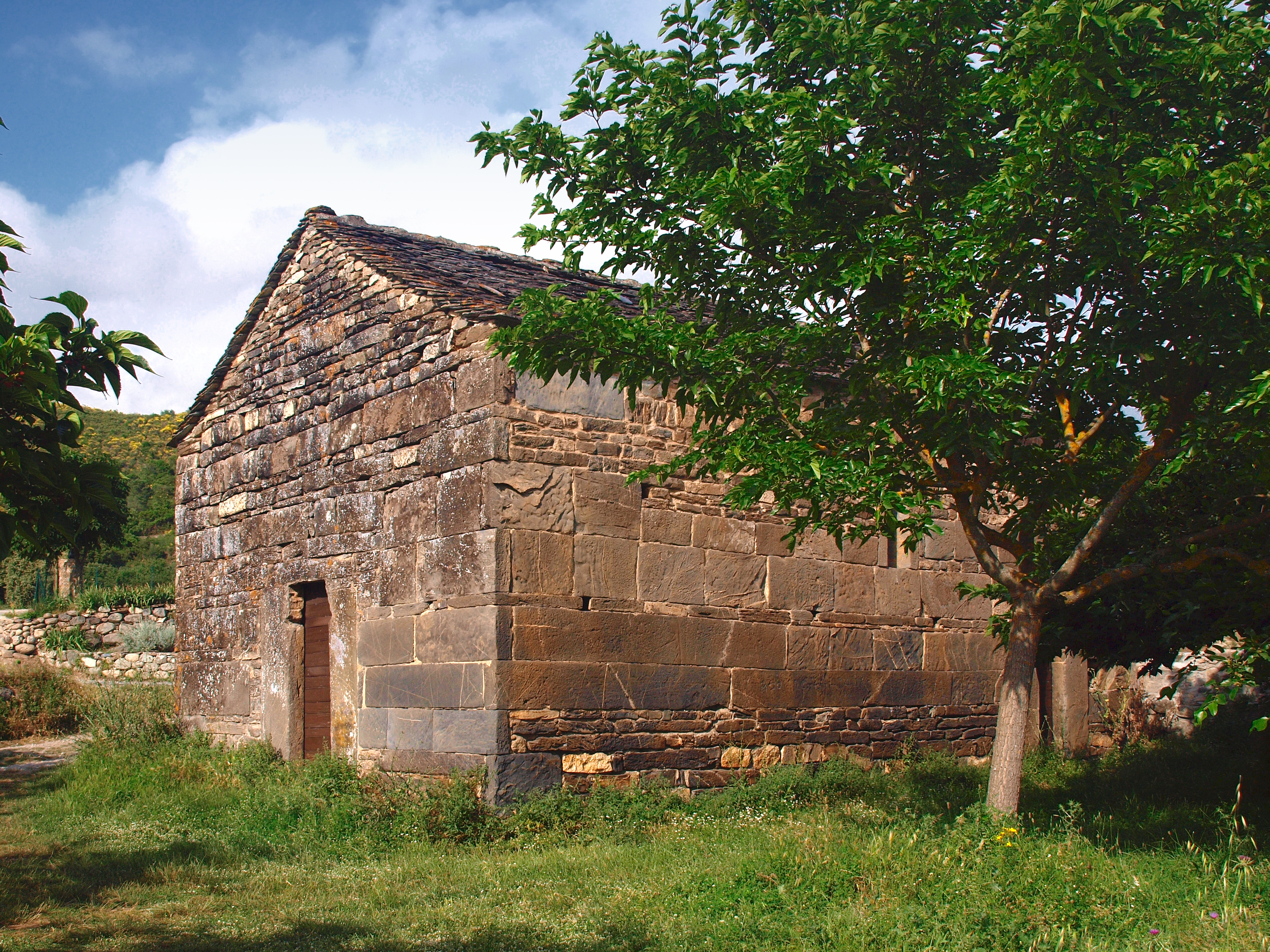
View to the West

Other religious sites of interest

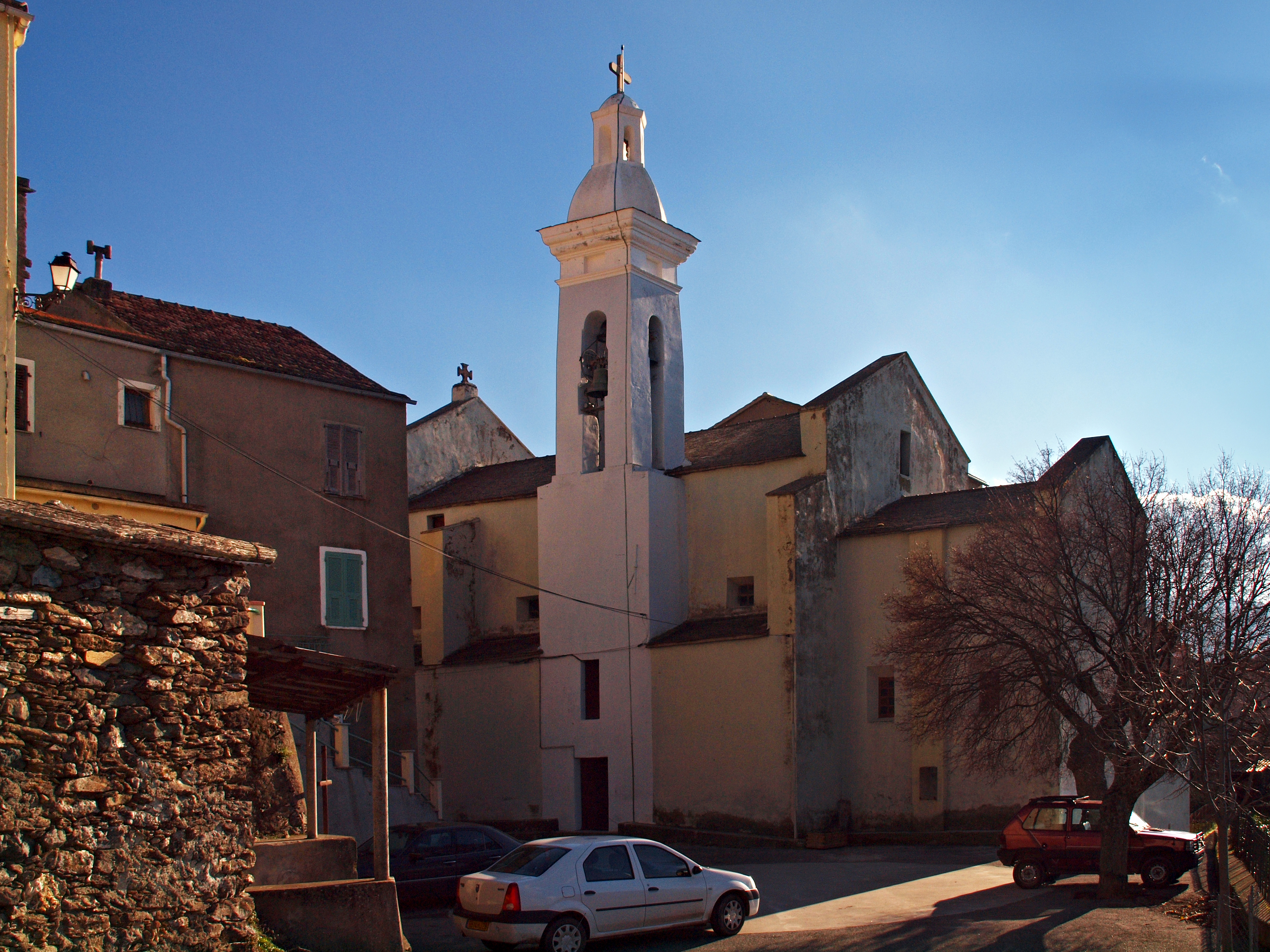
Church of Saint Mary

- The restored Romanesque Parish Church of Saint Mary. It was recently restored and its bell tower painted white. It is located in the heart of the village. There is some notable furniture in the sacristy.
- The ruined Chapel of Santu Michele located south-east of the village 527 m above sea level on Mount Santu Michele.
- The ruined Chapel of Sant'Alessio (Saint Alexis) located south of the village at 366 m altitude above the D314 road.

=== Natural heritage ===
The town is affected by an EU Site of Community Importance second generation (Directive 92/43/EEC).

=== ZNIEFF Lower Valley of the Tavignano ===
Ten communes share this zone which has an area of 1,057 hectares stretching along the river from Aleria to the Noceta bridge. "The lower valley of the Tavignano is the only place in Corsica where Shad is being successfully bred. The river is also home to the freshwater butterfish and many important macrobenthic invertebrates".

== Festivals and leisure ==
- Communal fair in early August

== Notable People linked to the commune ==
- Joseph Campana, Mayor from 1959 until his death in July 2001 (eight consecutive elections).
- Ghjuvan Francescu Bernabéi, killed by a cancer at the age of 20 in 1991. In his memory the Associu Ghjuvan Francescu was founded in 1991 to raise funds for Cancer research. They have an annual fund-raising day in Altiani.

== See also ==
- Communes of the Haute-Corse department
