= Tavignano =

River in the department of Haute-Corse, Corsica

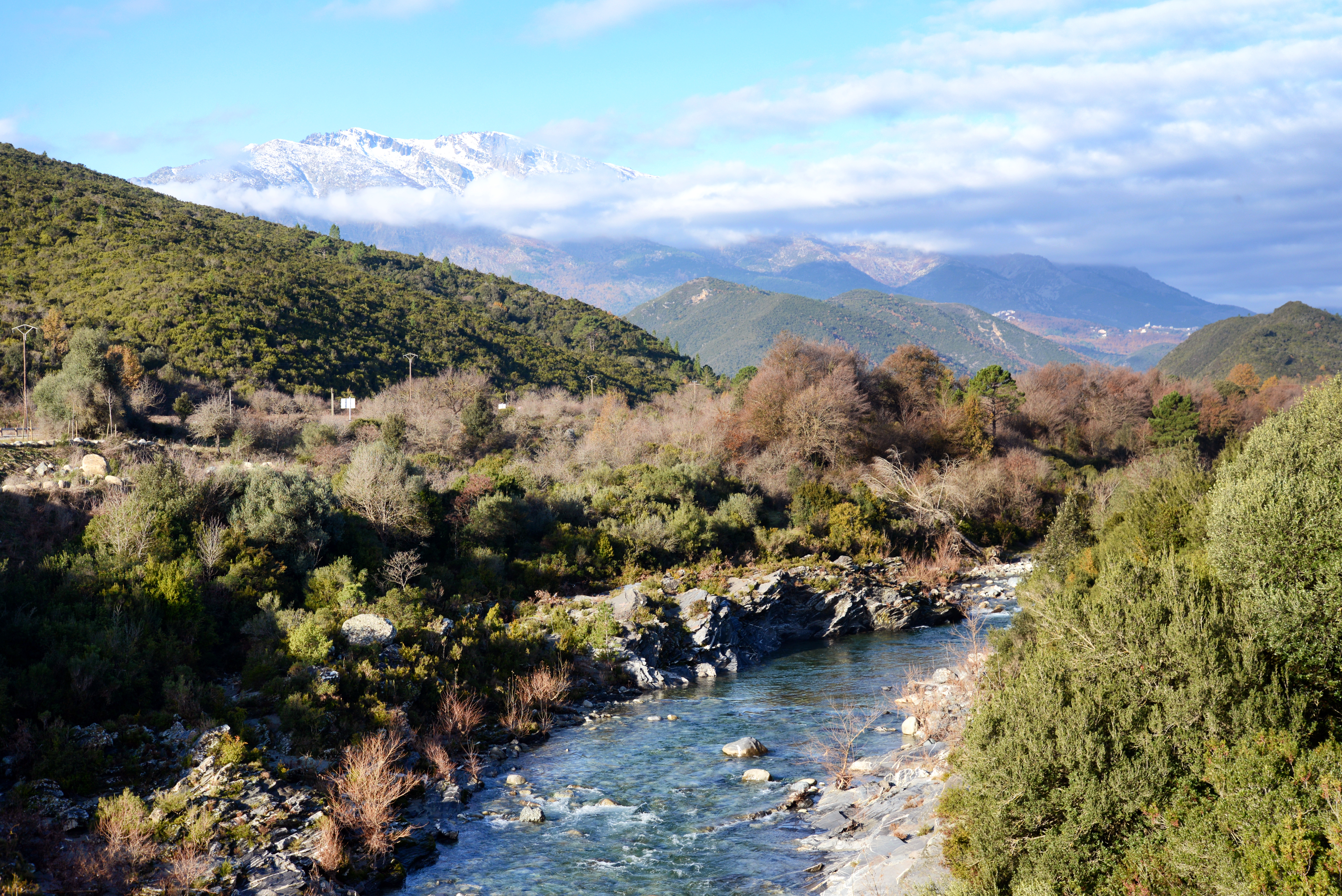

Location
- Country: France

Physical characteristics
- Source
  - location: central Corsica
- Mouth
  - location: Tyrrhenian Sea
  - coordinates: 42°6′13″N 9°32′56″E
- Length: 89 km (55 mi)

The Tavignano (French pronunciation: [taviɲano]; Corsican: Tavignanu) is a river on the island of Corsica, France.

== Course ==
The Tavignano is 88.9 km (55.2 mi) long. In antiquity the river was known as the Rhotanus or Ῥότανος. It crosses the communes of Aléria, Altiani, Antisanti, Casamaccioli, Corte, Erbajolo, Giuncaggio, Piedicorte-di-Gaggio, Poggio-di-Venaco, Riventosa, Santa-Lucia-di-Mercurio, Santo-Pietro-di-Venaco and Venaco.

The Tavignano rises below the 2,007 metres (6,585 ft) Capu a u Tozzu and flows to the east. It runs through Lac de Nino near its source. Part of the river's upper section flows through the Réserve biologique intégrale du Tavignano. It then flows through the town of Corte. From Corte it runs southeast to the Tyrrhenian Sea near Aléria, followed by the T50 road. it enters the sea between the Étang de Diane and the Étang del Sale. Its entire course is in the Haute-Corse département.

== Hydrology ==
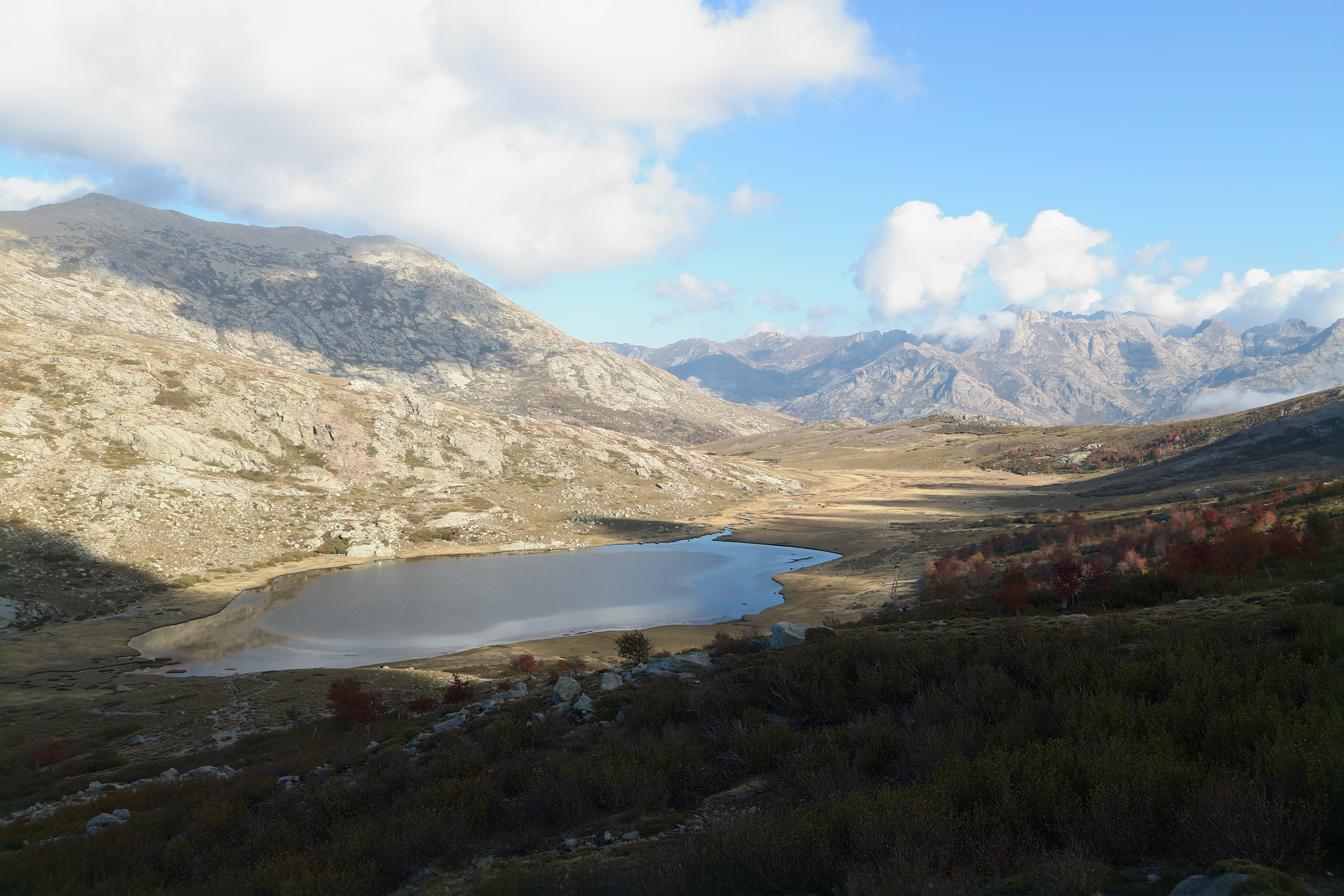
Lac de Nino near the source of the Tavignano

Tavignano upstream from Genoese bridge in Altiani

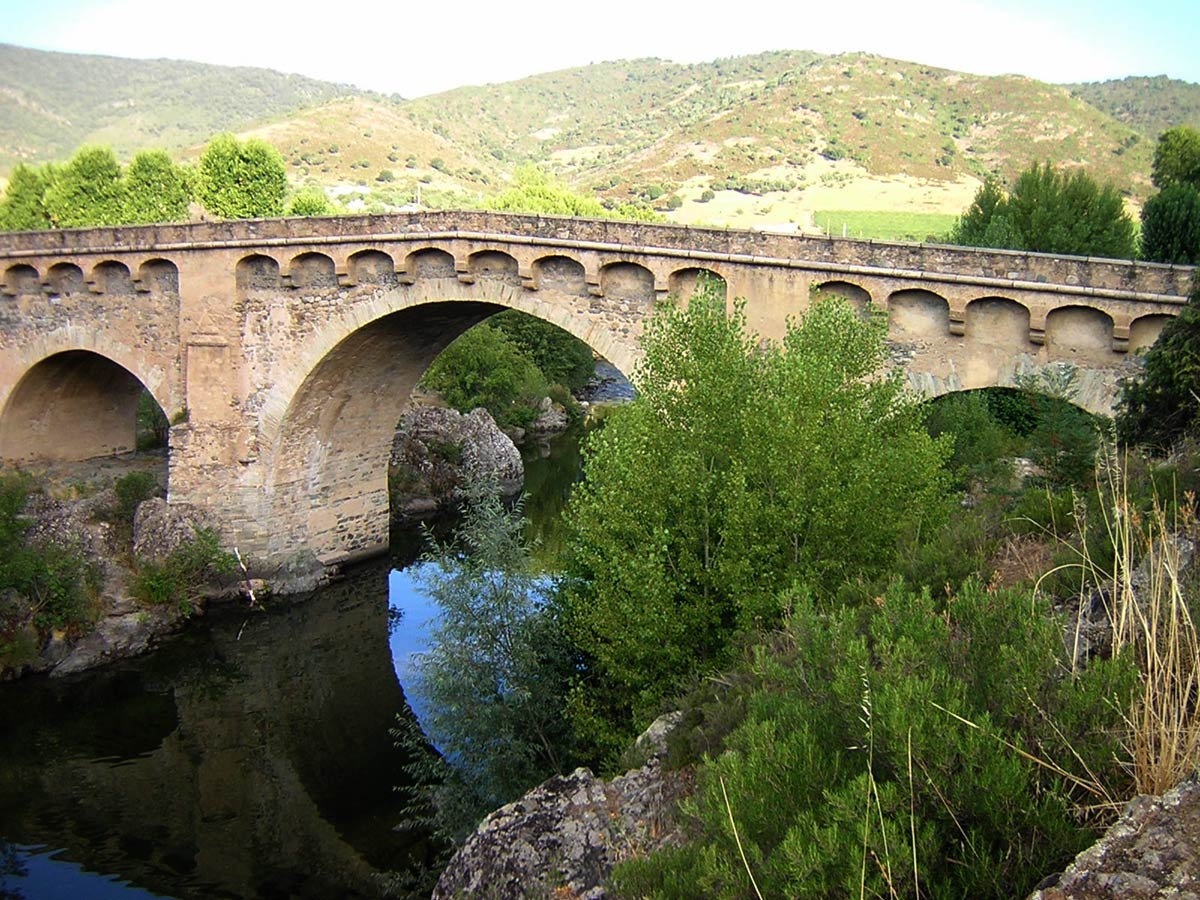
Genoese bridge in Altiani

Measurements of the river flow were taken at the Antisanti [Pont du Faïo] station from 1996 to 2021. The watershed above this station covers 573 square kilometres (221 sq mi). Annual precipitation was calculated as 509 millimetres (20.0 in). The average flow of water throughout the year was 9.23 cubic metres per second (326 cu ft/s).

Average flow (cubic meters per second) by month for the period 1996 to 2021
| Month | Flow |
|---|---|
| Jan | 12.50 |
| Feb | 11.60 |
| Mar | 13.70 |
| Apr | 14.10 |
| May | 12.10 |
| Jun | 5.260 |
| Jul | 1.800 |
| Aug | 0.907 |
| Sep | 1.860 |
| Oct | 4.880 |
| Nov | 15.50 |
| Dec | 16.70 |

== Tributaries ==
The following streams (ruisseaux) are tributaries of the Tavignano, ordered by length:

- Tagnone (river) 35 km (22 mi)
- Vecchio (river) 24 km (15 mi)
- Corsiglièse 24 km (15 mi)
- Restonica (river) 18 km (11 mi)
- Rio Magno 13 km (8.1 mi)
- Zincajo 12 km (7.5 mi)
- Minuto 11 km (6.8 mi)
- Limone 8 km (5.0 mi)
- Santa Lucia 8 km (5.0 mi)
- Saninco 7 km (4.3 mi)
- Pettilargo 6 km (3.7 mi)
- Alzeda 6 km (3.7 mi)
- Casaloria 6 km (3.7 mi)
- Lavagnano 6 km (3.7 mi)
- Bistuglio 6 km (3.7 mi)
- Salgerete 5 km (3.1 mi)
- Orta 5 km (3.1 mi)
- Catone 5 km (3.1 mi)
- Terranella 5 km (3.1 mi)
- Vado 5 km (3.1 mi)
- Vacile 5 km (3.1 mi)
- Furmicuccia 5 km (3.1 mi)
- Valle 4 km (2.5 mi)
- Mucchiello 4 km (2.5 mi)
- Rosajo 4 km (2.5 mi)
- Giovannaccia 4 km (2.5 mi)
- Figamellare 4 km (2.5 mi)
- Javinelle 3 km (1.9 mi)
- Castagnolu 3 km (1.9 mi)
- Scrocchiella 3 km (1.9 mi)
- Ombrone 3 km (1.9 mi)
- Antia 3 km (1.9 mi)
- Riu Ficu 3 km (1.9 mi)
- Crivia 3 km (1.9 mi)
- Paratelle 3 km (1.9 mi)
- Torbia 3 km (1.9 mi)
- Acqua Viva 3 km (1.9 mi)
- Vallerone 3 km (1.9 mi)
- Casaperta 3 km (1.9 mi)
- Figamorella 3 km (1.9 mi)
- Malasarto 2 km (1.2 mi)
- Creciani 2 km (1.2 mi)
- Castagno 2 km (1.2 mi)
- Suarte 2 km (1.2 mi)
- Pizzu Guardu 2 km (1.2 mi)
- Cannicciole 2 km (1.2 mi)
- l'Aghiola 2 km (1.2 mi)
- Campo di Vindico 2 km (1.2 mi)
- Valle Tose 2 km (1.2 mi)
- Cantinche 2 km (1.2 mi)
- Francesch Andrea 2 km (1.2 mi)
- Valle Maluse 2 km (1.2 mi)
- Palmurato 2 km (1.2 mi)
- Valle Allo Pero 2 km (1.2 mi)
- Pietracchiolo 2 km (1.2 mi)
- Torcelle 2 km (1.2 mi)
- Scampajolo 2 km (1.2 mi)
- Valle 2 km (1.2 mi)
- Piedimurelli 2 km (1.2 mi)
- Spelonche 2 km (1.2 mi)
- Finochietta 2 km (1.2 mi)
- Vaccherucci 2 km (1.2 mi)
- Peccaio 2 km (1.2 mi)
- Tromba 2 km (1.2 mi)
- Tribbiatoghia 1 km (0.62 mi)
- Castelluccia 1 km (0.62 mi)
- Malanotte 1 km (0.62 mi)
- Pescaja 1 km (0.62 mi)
- Suartello 1 km (0.62 mi)
- Olmo 1 km (0.62 mi)
- Ficaghiola 1 km (0.62 mi)
- Pietrelle 1 km (0.62 mi)
- Costadi 1 km (0.62 mi)
- Tiferi 1 km (0.62 mi)
- Stazzalello 1 km (0.62 mi)
- Sparabetto 1 km (0.62 mi)

== Sources ==
- "Le Tavignano à Antisanti [Pont du Faïo]", eaufrance (in French), Ministère de l'Ecologie, du Développement Durable et de l'Energie
- "Le Tavignano", Sandre (in French)
- "Relation: Le Tavignano (1075699)", OpenStreetMap (in French)
- Talbert, R.; Gillies, Sean; Elliott, Tom; Becker, Jeffrey, Places: 472122 (Rhotanos (river)), Pleiades
