= Corsiglièse =

Stream in the department of Haute-Corse, Corsica

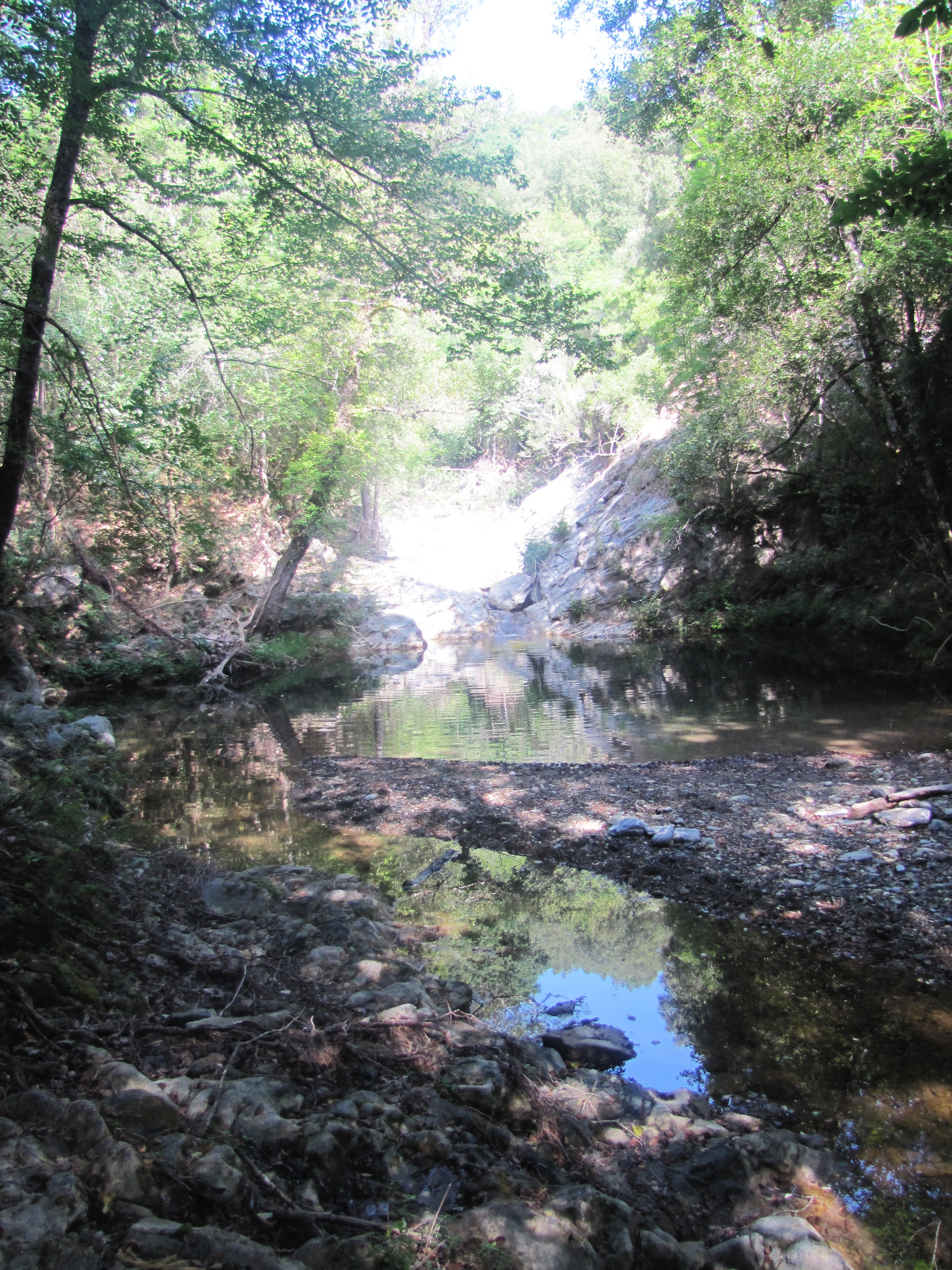
- The Corsiglièse below the village of Pietraserena by the path in front of the church

- Location within Corsica Location within France

Location
- Country: France
- Region: Corsica
- Department: Haute-Corse

Physical characteristics
- Mouth: Tavignano
  - coordinates: 42°10′28″N 9°24′54″E

Basin features
- Progression: Tavignano→ Tyrrhenian Sea

The Corsiglièse is a stream in the department of Haute-Corse, Corsica, France. It is a tributary of the river Tavignano.

== Course ==
The Corsiglièse is 24.31 kilometres (15.11 mi) long. The stream rises to the south of the village of Sant'Andréa-di-Bozio and flows in a generally south-southeast direction to its junction with the Tavignano. It runs between the D16 or D116 to the east and the D14 to the west. The course of the Corsiglièse follows a fault between the schist mountains and the eastern plain, an unstable area where landslides are possible.

The castrum of Petralerata (Pietr'Ellerat) was in the heart of the Corsiglièse valley, on a peak, and had a defensive character unmatched on the island. It was first mentioned in 1149.

== Tributaries ==
The following streams (ruisseaux) are tributaries of the Corsiglièse:

- Brancuccia
- Ciotte
  - Vaccili
  - Osse
- Moulins
- Suera
- Tempiu
  - Cognolare
  - Rejone
- Casamora
- Noce Fiuminale
  - Mandriale .
  - Fontanello
- Barbuzani
  - Chierchiaje
- Molinello
  - Campu a l'Olivu
  - Ciocciu
  - Cardiccia

== Sources ==
- "Cortinco", armorial.org (in French)
- Non au projet de centre d'enfouissement de Ghjuncaghju/Giuncaggio (in French), U Levante, 25 March 2016
- "Relation: Ruisseau de Corsiglièse (8474738)", OpenStreetMap
- "ruisseau de corsigliese", Sandre (in French)
