= Santo-Pietro-di-Venaco =

- Commune
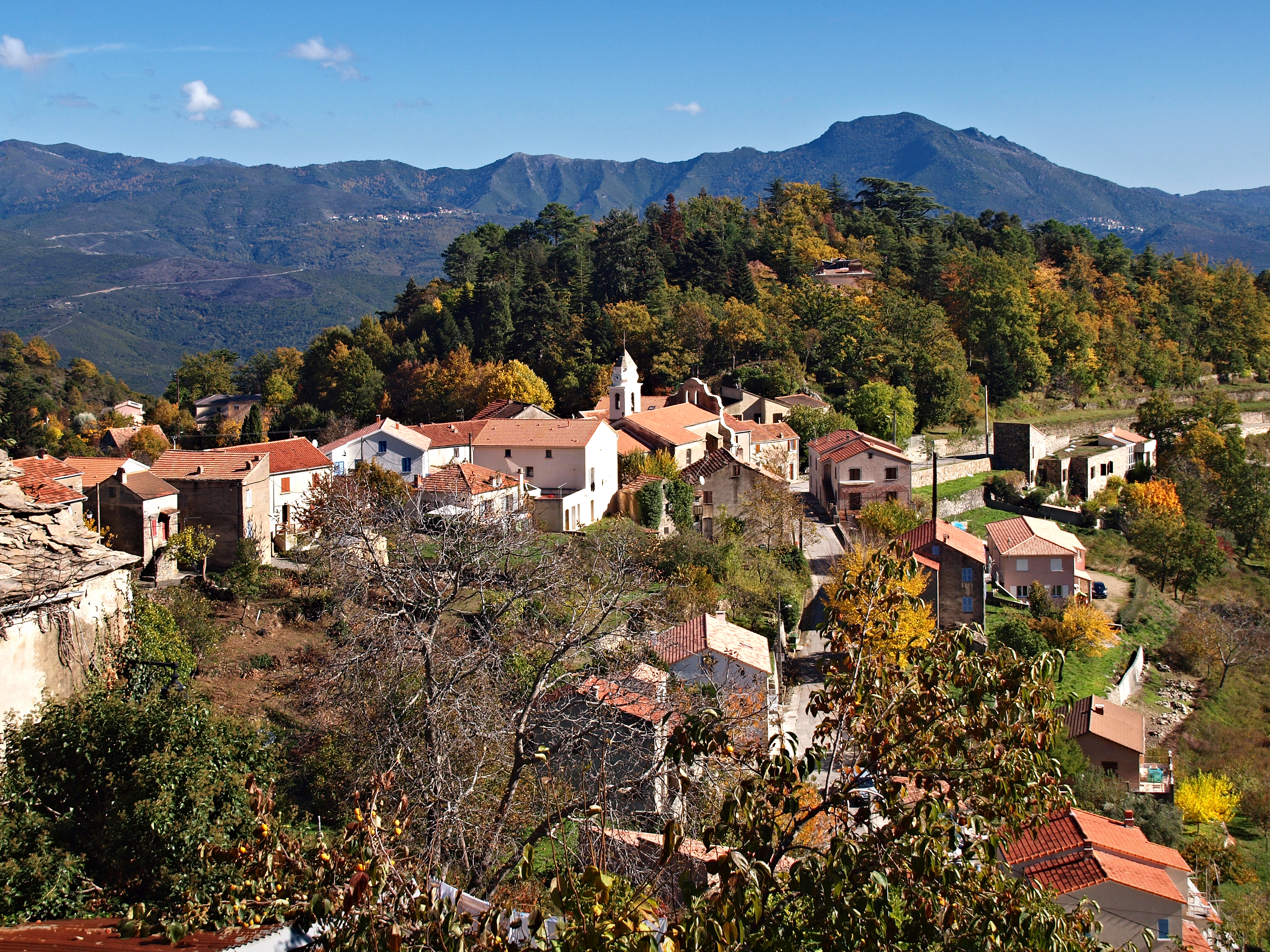
- A view of the village, with the villages of Erbajolo (left) and Altiani (right) in the background
- Location of Santo-Pietro-di-Venaco
- Location within France Location within Corsica
- Coordinates: 42°14′47″N 9°10′20″E
- Country: France
- Region: Corsica
- Department: Haute-Corse
- Arrondissement: Corte
- Canton: Corte
- Intercommunality: Centre Corse

Government
  - Mayor (2024–2026): Toussaint Rinieri
- Area^{1}: 7.96 km^{2} (3.07 sq mi)
- Elevation: 860 m (2,820 ft)
- Highest elevation: 2,400 m (7,900 ft)
- Lowest elevation: 217 m (712 ft)
- Population (2023): 305
  - Density: 38.3/km^{2} (99.2/sq mi)
- Time zone: UTC+01:00 (CET)
  - Summer (DST): UTC+02:00 (CEST)
- INSEE/Postal code: 2B315 /20250
- ^{1} French Land Register data, which excludes lakes, ponds, glaciers > 1 km^{2} (0.386 sq mi or 247 acres) and river estuaries.

Santo-Pietro-di-Venaco is a commune in the Haute-Corse department of France on the island of Corsica.

== Population ==
Historical population
Year	Pop.	±% p.a.
1968	165	—
1975	126	−3.78%
1982	168	+4.20%
1990	166	−0.15%
1999	198	+1.98%
2007	212	+0.86%
2012	262	+4.33%
2017	277	+1.12%
2023	305	+1.62%
Source: INSEE

== See also ==
- Communes of the Haute-Corse department
- Henry Padovani
- Pierre Salvadori
- Lea Padovani
