= Étang del Sale =

Étang de Sale
- Location within Corsica Location within France
- Coordinates: 42°5′12″N 9°31′29″E
- Type: Lagoon
- Ocean/sea sources: Tyrrhenian Sea
- Basin countries: Corsica, France

The Étang de Sale (Note: Étang may be translated as "pond" or "lagoon".) is a coastal wetland beside the Tyrrhenian Sea on the east coast of the Haute-Corse department of the French island of Corsica.

== Location ==
The Étang de Sale is in the commune of Aléria. It lies between the T10 coastal highway and the sea, to the south of the village of Aléria and the Étang de Diane. At the north the wetland is delimited by the Tavignano river. The wetland is 3.6 kilometres (2.2 mi) long and covers an area of 280.33 hectares (692.7 acres). The lagoon covers about 200 hectares (490 acres). To the south is the agricultural estate of the Casabianda Detention Center. The Étang d'Urbino is 2.25 kilometres (1.40 mi) to the southeast.

== History ==
Before about 4050 BCE the Étang de Sale site held a forest of pine, alder and deciduous oak, with some lime and birch. After this period there was a growing population of holm oak (Quercus ilex) and increasing numbers of forest species. This continued until perhaps 1300 CE, when there was a large-scale clearance, after which herb species such as Cyperaceae, Poaceae, Chenopodiaceae, Cistus, Asteroideae and Cichoriaceae became dominant.

The lagoon has been extensively modified since the start of the Genoese period until the 19th and 20th centuries. In the 17th century Genoese engineers tried (and failed) to drain the marsh for use in cereal production, and to reduce health problems. It was once very saline, as the name "Del Sale" implies. 19th-century hydraulic works (Mulinu Rossu (Note: The water mill pumped salty water from a low point in the lagoon up to a point in the channel leading to the Tavignano river, from where it would flow to the sea. Lighter fresh water from the river would flow in the reverse direction, making the lagoon less salty.)) provided a supply of fresh water, which allowed a huge reed bed to grow. The result is an unusual combination of freshwater vegetation and vegetation of salty coastal soils.

Some large eucalyptus trees near the beach remain from plantations at the end of the 19th century. They were thought to clean the air of malaria, which was then decimating the population of the Casabianda penal colony. From 1951 the site was classified as a hunting reserve. In 1999 the Conservatoire du Littoral et des Rivages Lacustres acquired the 280 hectares (690 acres) property.

== Ecology ==
The Étang de Sale is a Natura 2000 site. The wetland has been protected since 1999. It consists of a reed bed bordered by bullrushes to the southwest, and a marshy area with salt tolerant vegetation to the north. There are scattered tamarix trees around the wetland. A sandy lido (landspit) separates the wetland from the sea. It was once wooded with maritime pines (Pinus pinaster), and today has formations of Helianthemum. The Köppen climate classification is Csa : Hot-summer Mediterranean climate.

The lagoon has rich biodiversity. Habitats include deep wetland (reed beds), intermediate wetland (rushes and papyrus), shallow wetland (salt marsh), dune environments (varied dune vegetation and tamarix), afforestation and maquis shrubland (ash trees and eucalyptus, olive trees, plum trees).

== Sources ==
- Ciriacono, Salvatore (2006), Building on Water: Venice, Holland and the Construction of the European Landscape in Early Modern Times, Berghahn Books, ISBN 9781845450656
- Del Sale (in French), Conservatoire du littoral
- "Étang del Sale, Corse, France", Mindat
- Evolution de la végétation de l'étang Del Sale (incidence sur la végétation des travaux hydrauliques) (in French), Office International de l'Eau, 2001
- "Rénovation de l'Usine de relevage des eaux « Mulinu Rossu » (Etang Del Sale, Corse)", zones-humides.org (in French), eauFrance
- Thornes, John B.; Wainwright, John (2004), Environmental Issues in the Mediterranean: Processes and Perspectives from the Past and Present, Routledge, ISBN 9781134729869
- "Way: Étang del Sale (42274234)", OpenStreetMap
