= Casanova, Haute-Corse =

Casanova
- Commune
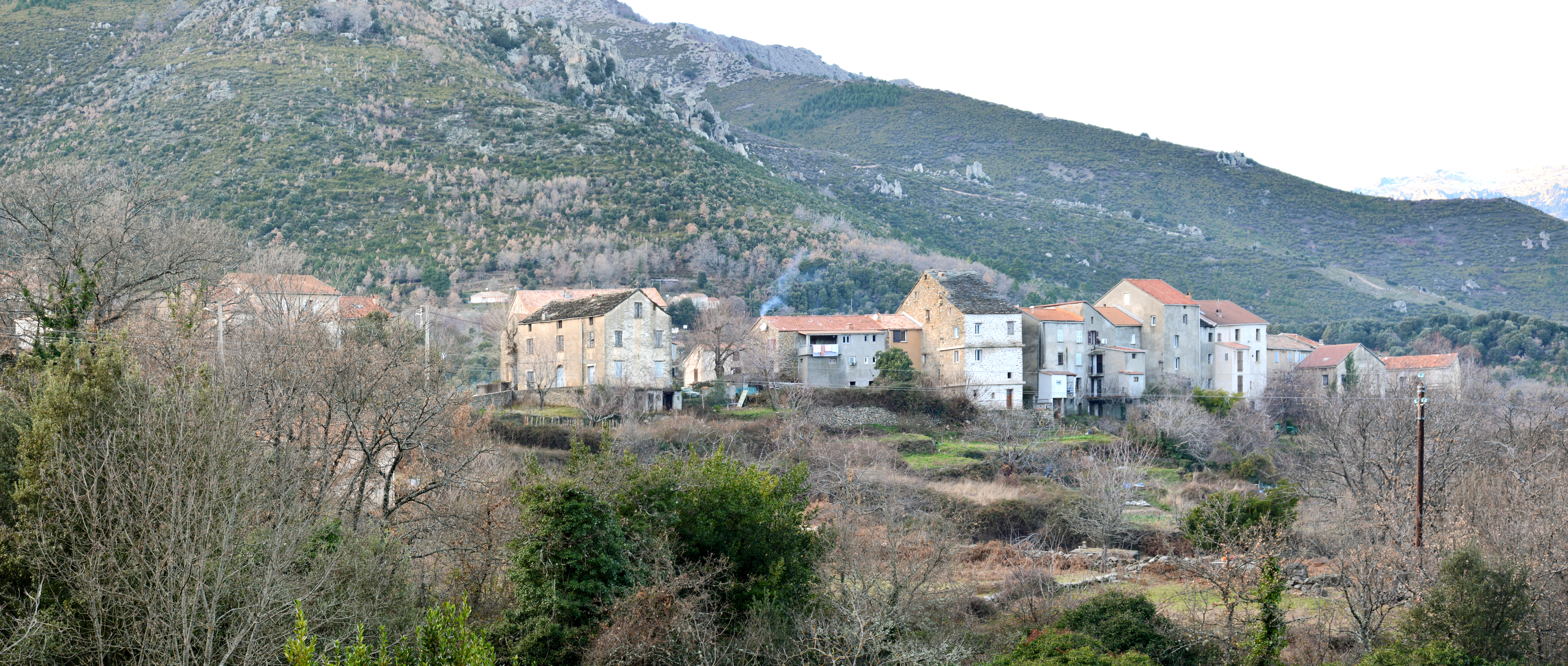
- A panorama of the old village
- Location of Casanova
- Location within France Location within Corsica
- Coordinates: 42°15′19″N 9°10′30″E
- Country: France
- Region: Corsica
- Department: Haute-Corse
- Arrondissement: Corte
- Canton: Corte
- Intercommunality: Centre Corse

Government
  - Mayor (2020–2026): Thierry Cambon
- Area^{1}: 9.89 km^{2} (3.82 sq mi)
- Elevation: 650 m (2,130 ft)
- Highest elevation: 2,378 m (7,802 ft)
- Lowest elevation: 537 m (1,762 ft)
- Population (2023): 384
  - Density: 38.8/km^{2} (101/sq mi)
- Time zone: UTC+01:00 (CET)
  - Summer (DST): UTC+02:00 (CEST)
- INSEE/Postal code: 2B074 /20250
- ^{1} French Land Register data, which excludes lakes, ponds, glaciers > 1 km^{2} (0.386 sq mi or 247 acres) and river estuaries.

Casanova (French pronunciation: [kazanɔva]) is a commune in the Haute-Corse department of France on the island of Corsica.

== Population ==
Historical population
Year	Pop.	±% p.a.
1968	121	—
1975	125	+0.47%
1982	128	+0.34%
1990	195	+5.40%
1999	264	+3.42%
2007	339	+3.17%
2012	349	+0.58%
2017	391	+2.30%
2023	384	−0.30%
Source: INSEE
