= Lac de Nino =

Lake in Corsica, France

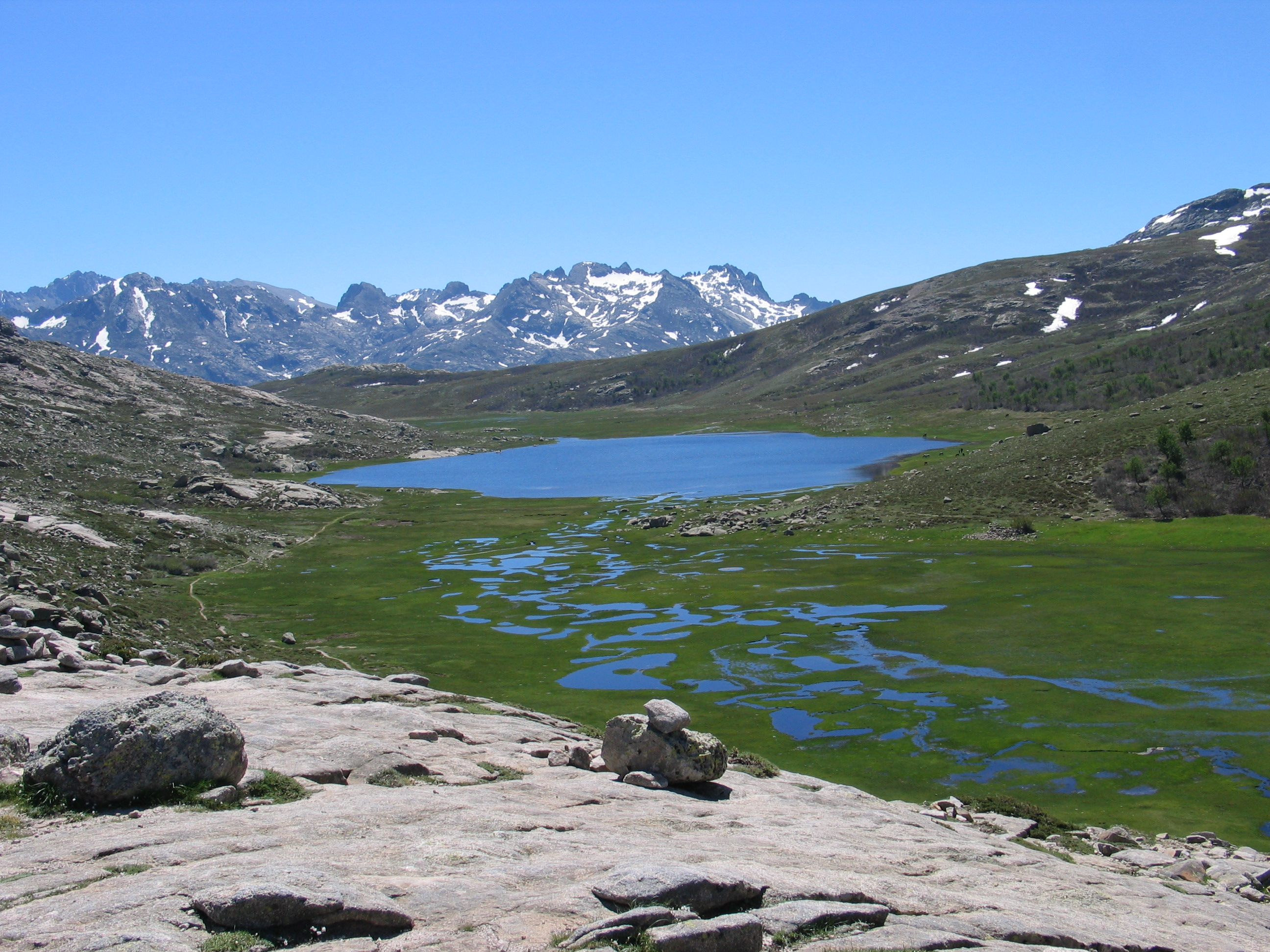

- Location within Corsica
- Location: Haute-Corse
- Coordinates: 42°15′20″N 8°56′25″E
- Type: glacial
- Primary outflows: Tavignano
- Basin countries: France
- Surface area: 0.065 km^{2} (0.025 sq mi)
- Max. depth: 12 m (39 ft)
- Surface elevation: 1,743 m (5,719 ft)

Lac de Nino is a lake in Haute-Corse, France. At an elevation of 1743 m, its surface area is 0.065 km².

The lake is on the Tavignano river near to its source below the 1,883 metres (6,178 ft) Bocca a Reta. It is on the boundary between the communes of Casamaccioli and Corte. The river flows through marshy land above and below the lake.

== Sources ==
- "Way: Lac de Nino (28890021)", OpenStreetMap
