= Canton of Corte =

Coordinates: 42.31°N 9.15°E

The canton of Corte (Corsican: cantone di Corti, French: canton de Corte) is an administrative division of the Haute-Corse department, southeastern France. Its borders were modified at the French canton reorganisation which came into effect in March 2015. Its seat is in Corte.

It consists of the following communes:

1. Casanova
2. Corte
3. Muracciole
4. Poggio-di-Venaco
5. Riventosa
6. Santo-Pietro-di-Venaco
7. Venaco
8. Vivario
