= Pietraserena =

- Commune
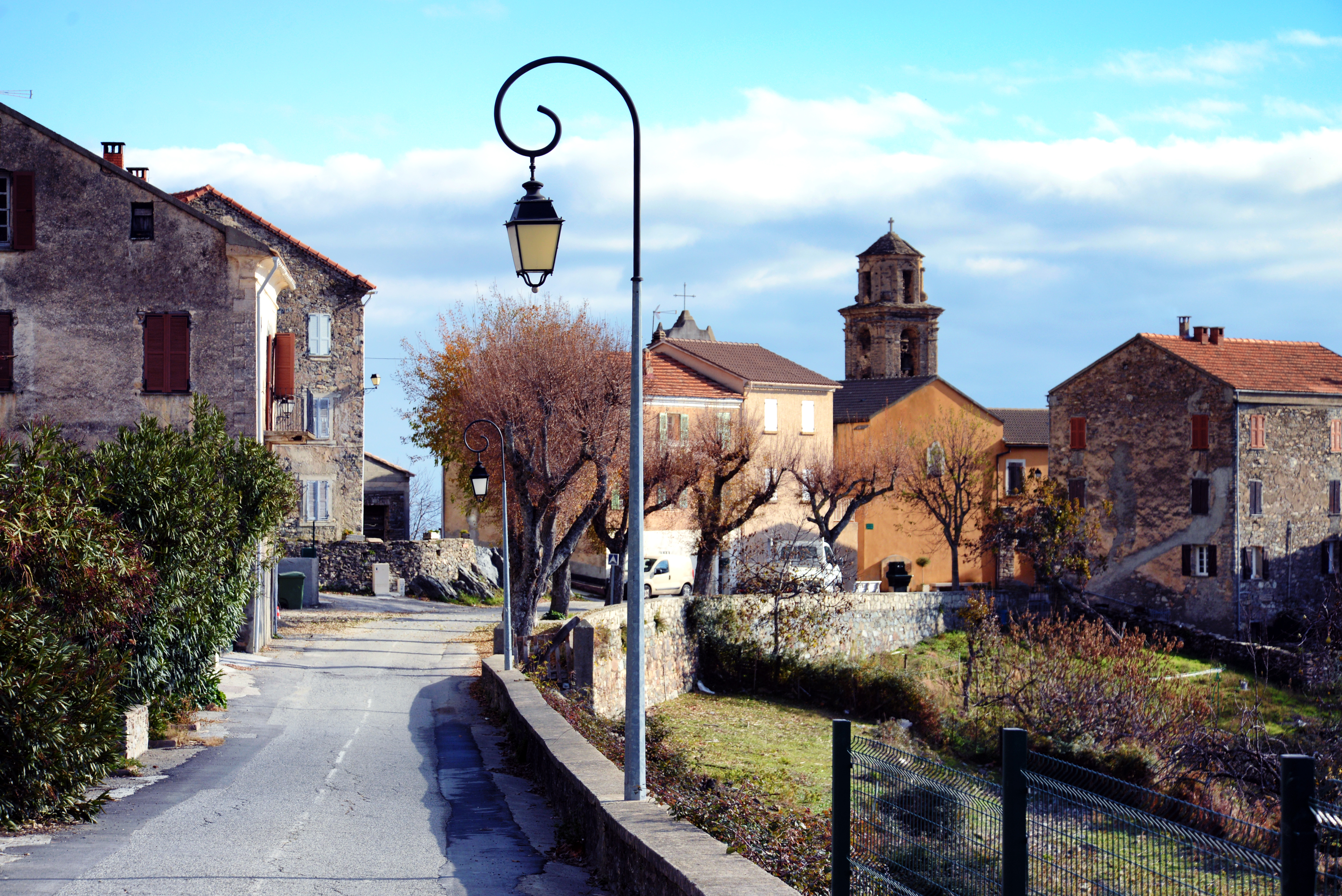
- The entrance to the village of Pietraserena, from Piedicorte-di-Gaggio
- Location of Pietraserena
- Location within France Location within Corsica
- Coordinates: 42°14′10″N 9°20′47″E
- Country: France
- Region: Corsica
- Department: Haute-Corse
- Arrondissement: Corte
- Canton: Ghisonaccia

Government
  - Mayor (2020–2026): Bernard Vannucci
- Area^{1}: 6.72 km^{2} (2.59 sq mi)
- Elevation: 700 m (2,300 ft)
- Highest elevation: 770 m (2,530 ft)
- Lowest elevation: 231 m (758 ft)
- Population (2023): 62
  - Density: 9.2/km^{2} (24/sq mi)
- Time zone: UTC+01:00 (CET)
  - Summer (DST): UTC+02:00 (CEST)
- INSEE/Postal code: 2B226 /20251
- ^{1} French Land Register data, which excludes lakes, ponds, glaciers > 1 km^{2} (0.386 sq mi or 247 acres) and river estuaries.

Pietraserena is a commune in the Haute-Corse department of France on the island of Corsica.

== Population ==
Historical population
Year	Pop.	±% p.a.
1968	138	—
1975	134	−0.42%
1982	131	−0.32%
1990	92	−4.32%
1999	80	−1.54%
2007	75	−0.80%
2012	74	−0.27%
2017	72	−0.55%
2023	62	−2.46%
Source: INSEE

== See also ==
- Communes of the Haute-Corse department
