= Église Saint-Martin d'Erbajolo =

Church located in Haute-Corse, Corsica

Coordinates: 42°15′53″N 9°17′0″E

Église Saint-Martin d'Erbajolo is a church in Erbajolo, Haute-Corse, Corsica. The building was classified as a Historic Monument in 1926.
