= Pancheraccia =

- Commune
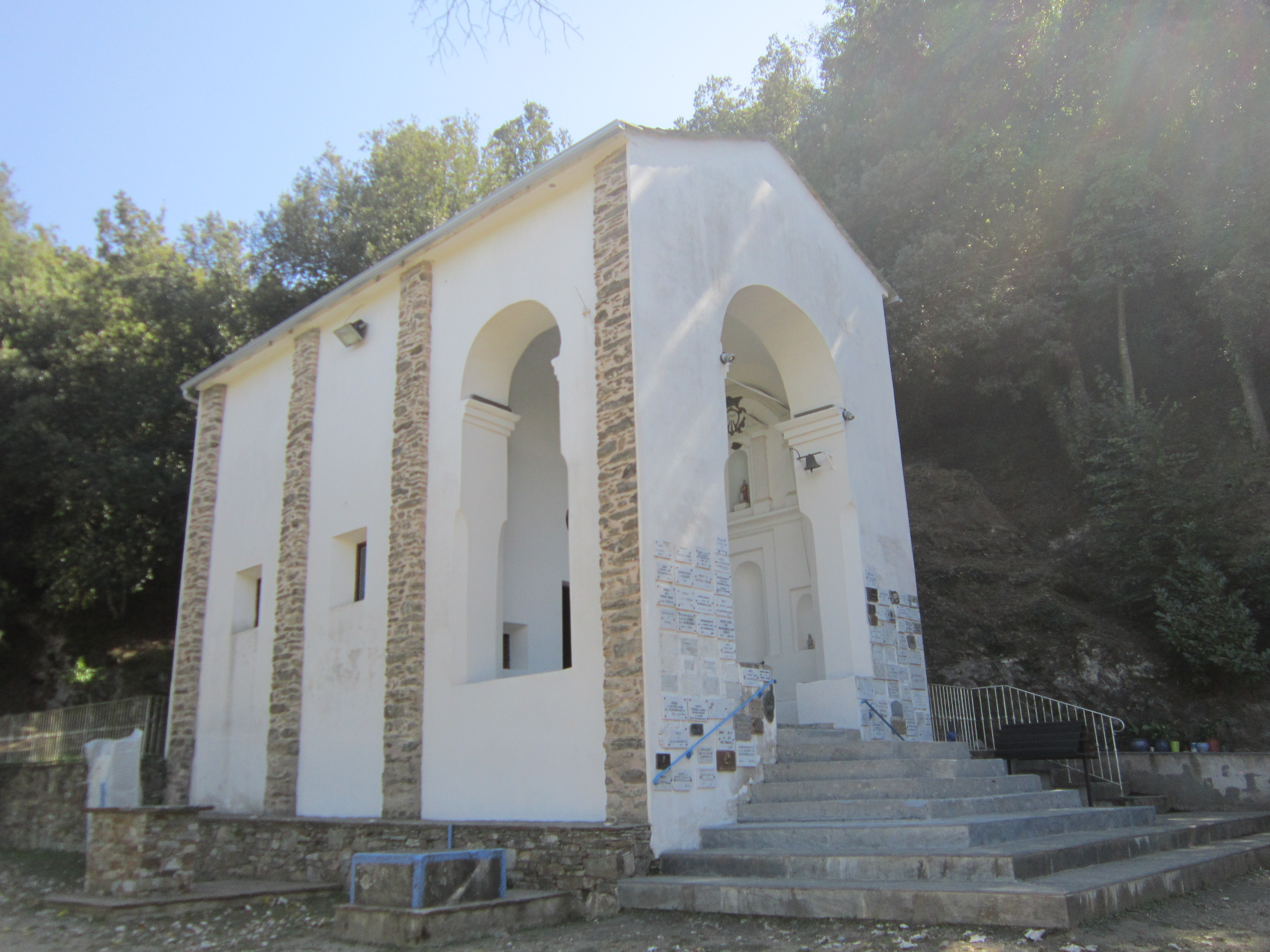
- The chapel of Our Lady, in Pancheraccia
- Location of Pancheraccia
- Location within France Location within Corsica
- Coordinates: 42°13′11″N 9°22′20″E
- Country: France
- Region: Corsica
- Department: Haute-Corse
- Arrondissement: Corte
- Canton: Ghisonaccia

Government
  - Mayor (2020–2026): Paul Angeli
- Area^{1}: 14.35 km^{2} (5.54 sq mi)
- Elevation: 500 m (1,600 ft)
- Highest elevation: 735 m (2,411 ft)
- Lowest elevation: 24 m (79 ft)
- Population (2023): 198
  - Density: 13.8/km^{2} (35.7/sq mi)
- Time zone: UTC+01:00 (CET)
  - Summer (DST): UTC+02:00 (CEST)
- INSEE/Postal code: 2B201 /20251
- ^{1} French Land Register data, which excludes lakes, ponds, glaciers > 1 km^{2} (0.386 sq mi or 247 acres) and river estuaries.

Pancheraccia is a commune in the Haute-Corse department of France on the island of Corsica.

== Population ==
Historical population
Year	Pop.	±% p.a.
1968	137	—
1975	125	−1.30%
1982	116	−1.06%
1990	187	+6.15%
1999	184	−0.18%
2007	182	−0.14%
2012	166	−1.82%
2017	187	+2.41%
2023	198	+0.96%
Source: INSEE

== See also ==
- Communes of the Haute-Corse department
