= Riventosa =

- Commune
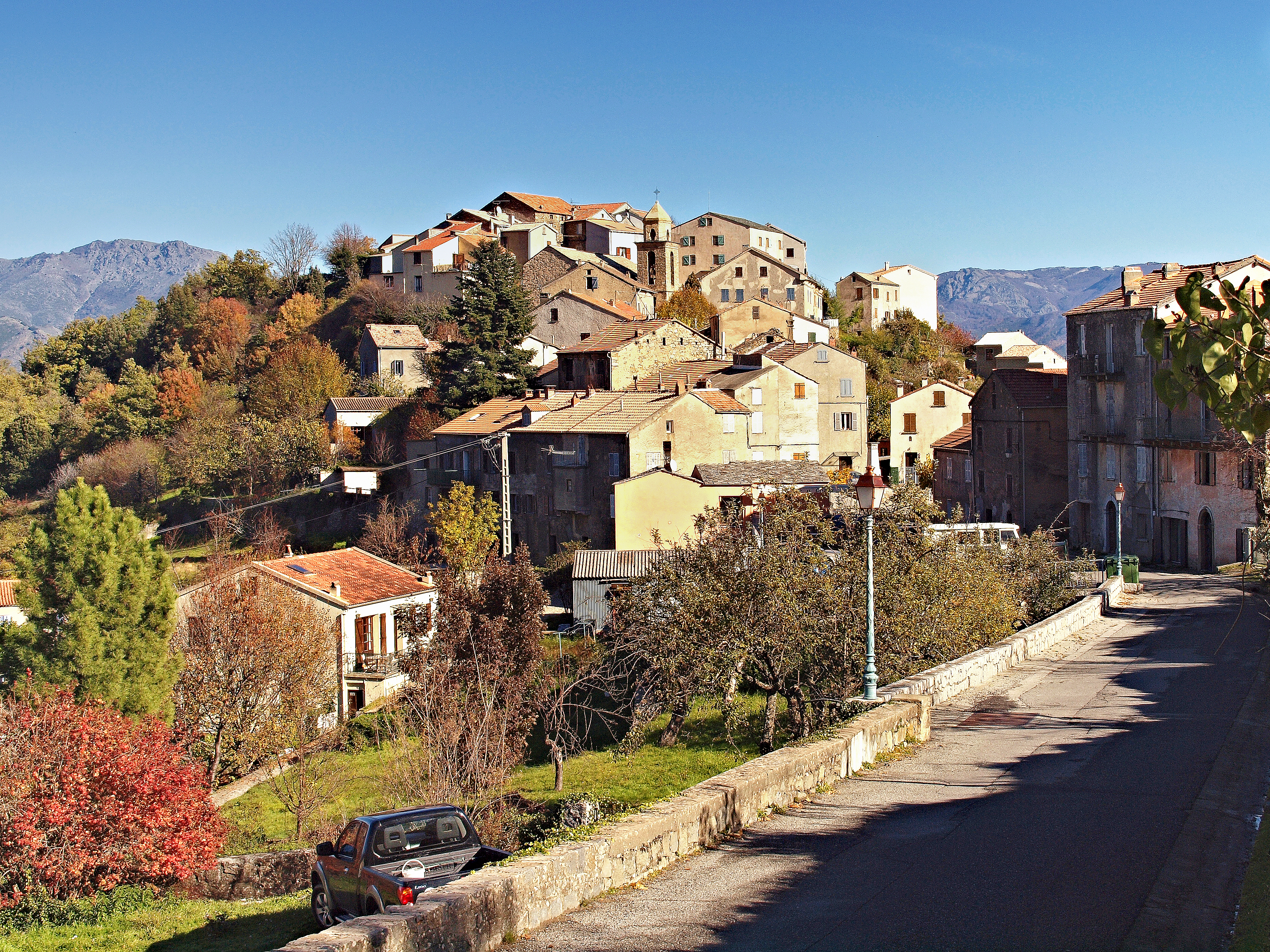
- The village of Riventosa
- Location of Riventosa
- Location within France Location within Corsica
- Coordinates: 42°15′07″N 9°10′57″E
- Country: France
- Region: Corsica
- Department: Haute-Corse
- Arrondissement: Corte
- Canton: Corte
- Intercommunality: Centre Corse

Government
  - Mayor (2020–2026): Marcel Cesari
- Area^{1}: 6.03 km^{2} (2.33 sq mi)
- Elevation: 710 m (2,330 ft)
- Highest elevation: 761 m (2,497 ft)
- Lowest elevation: 216 m (709 ft)
- Population (2023): 145
  - Density: 24.0/km^{2} (62.3/sq mi)
- Time zone: UTC+01:00 (CET)
  - Summer (DST): UTC+02:00 (CEST)
- INSEE/Postal code: 2B260 /20250
- ^{1} French Land Register data, which excludes lakes, ponds, glaciers > 1 km^{2} (0.386 sq mi or 247 acres) and river estuaries.

Riventosa is a commune in the Haute-Corse department of France on the island of Corsica.

== Population ==
Historical population
Year	Pop.	±% p.a.
1968	108	—
1975	97	−1.52%
1982	121	+3.21%
1990	135	+1.38%
1999	188	+3.75%
2007	173	−1.03%
2012	157	−1.92%
2017	157	+0.00%
2023	145	−1.32%
Source: INSEE

== See also ==
- Communes of the Haute-Corse department
