= Poggio-di-Venaco =

- Commune
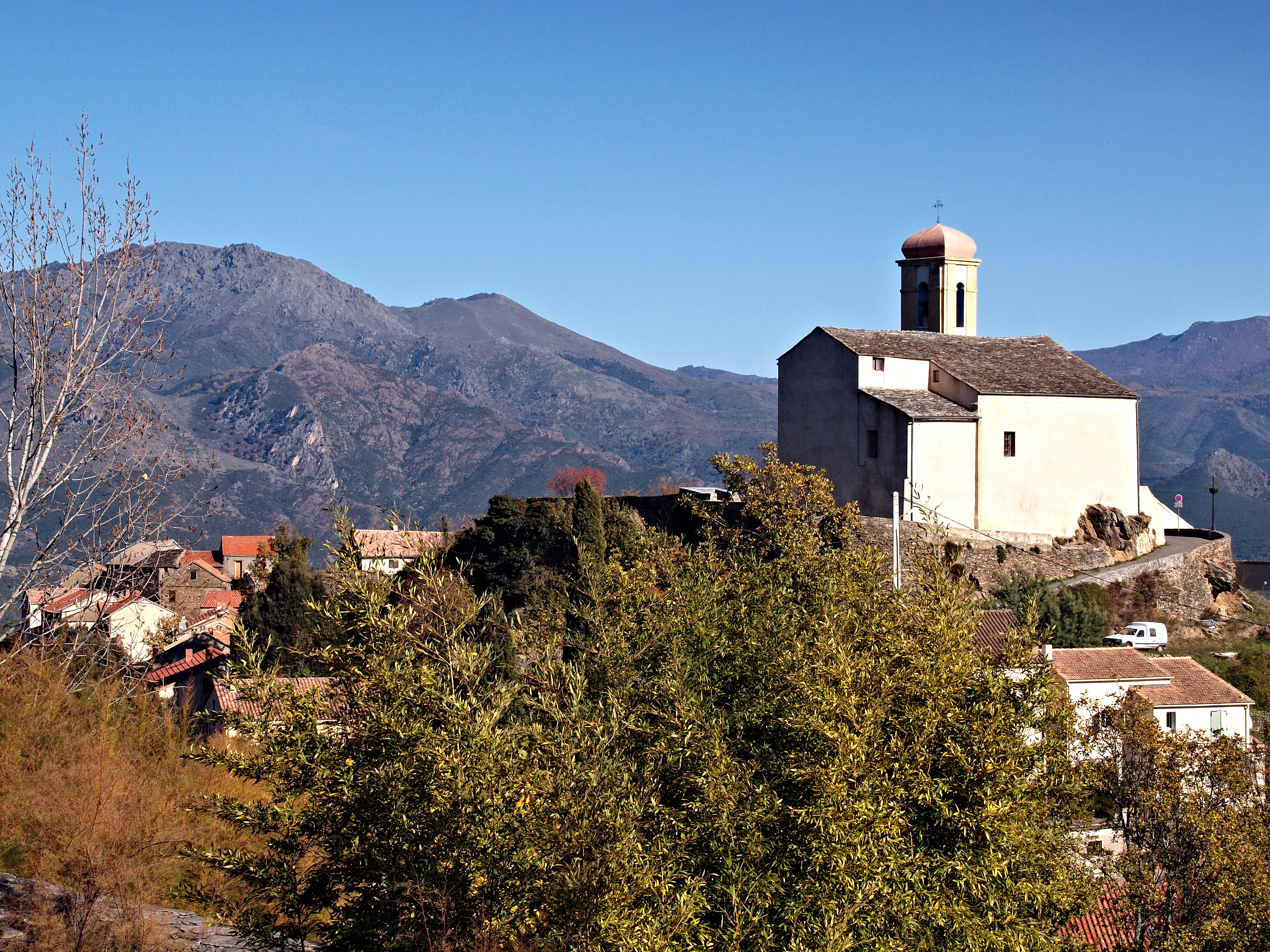
- The church of San Quilicu, in Poggio-di-Venaco
- Location of Poggio-di-Venaco
- Location within France Location within Corsica
- Coordinates: 42°15′32″N 9°11′13″E
- Country: France
- Region: Corsica
- Department: Haute-Corse
- Arrondissement: Corte
- Canton: Corte
- Intercommunality: Centre Corse

Government
  - Mayor (2020–2026): Jean-Marc Rodriguez
- Area^{1}: 13.28 km^{2} (5.13 sq mi)
- Elevation: 630 m (2,070 ft)
- Highest elevation: 662 m (2,172 ft)
- Lowest elevation: 226 m (741 ft)
- Population (2023): 211
  - Density: 15.9/km^{2} (41.2/sq mi)
- Time zone: UTC+01:00 (CET)
  - Summer (DST): UTC+02:00 (CEST)
- INSEE/Postal code: 2B238 /20250
- ^{1} French Land Register data, which excludes lakes, ponds, glaciers > 1 km^{2} (0.386 sq mi or 247 acres) and river estuaries.

Poggio-di-Venaco (Italian: Poggio di Venaco; Corsican: U Poghju di Vènacu) is a commune in the Haute-Corse department of France on the island of Corsica.

== Population ==
Historical population
Year	Pop.	±% p.a.
1968	176	—
1975	167	−0.75%
1982	132	−3.30%
1990	95	−4.03%
1999	136	+4.07%
2007	183	+3.78%
2012	192	+0.96%
2017	214	+2.19%
2023	211	−0.24%
Source: INSEE

== See also ==
- Communes of the Haute-Corse department
