= Focicchia =

- Commune
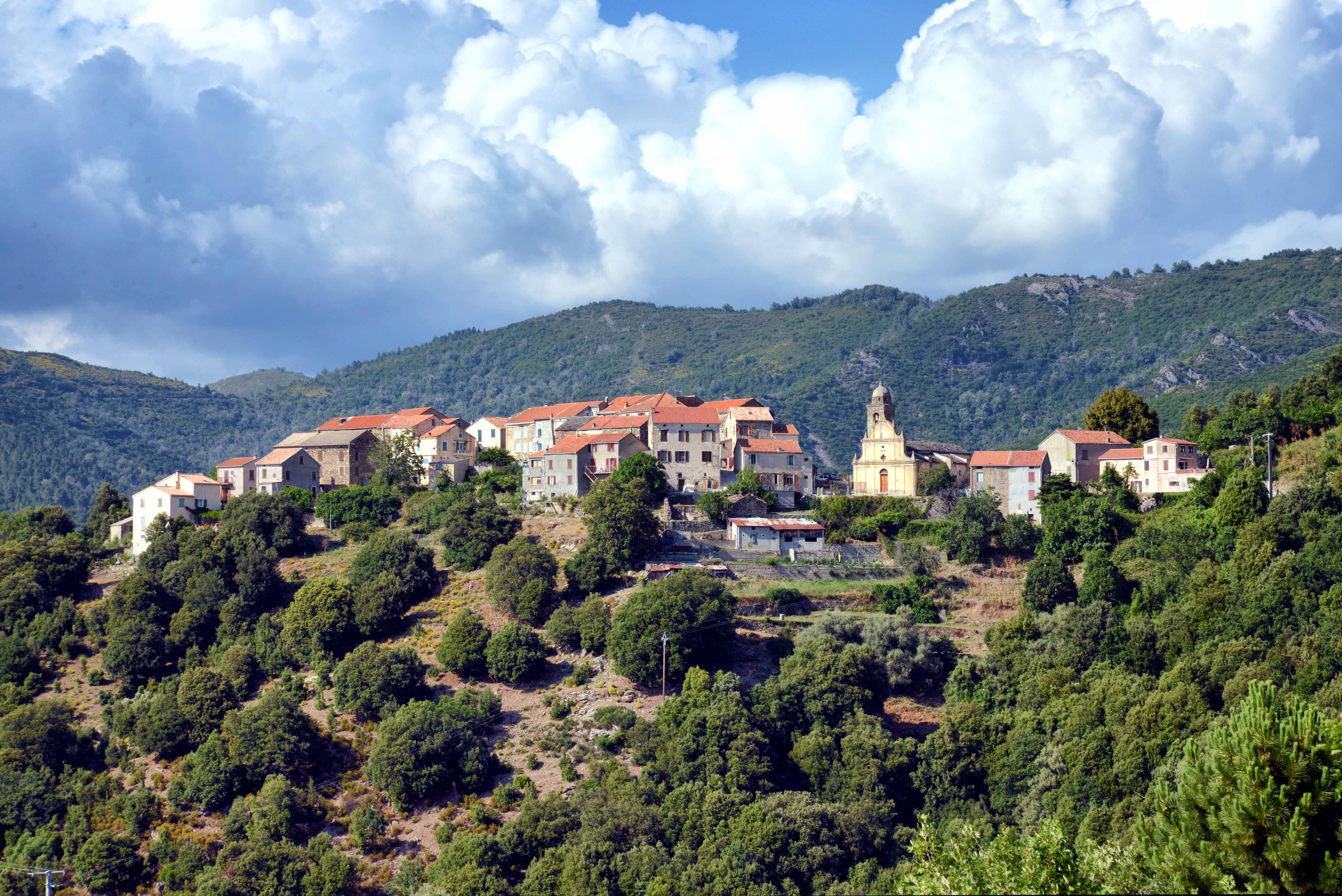
- A general view of the village
- Location of Focicchia
- Location within France Location within Corsica
- Coordinates: 42°15′05″N 9°17′42″E
- Country: France
- Region: Corsica
- Department: Haute-Corse
- Arrondissement: Corte
- Canton: Golo-Morosaglia

Government
  - Mayor (2020–2026): Jacques Leca
- Area^{1}: 7.11 km^{2} (2.75 sq mi)
- Elevation: 654 m (2,146 ft)
- Highest elevation: 1,192 m (3,911 ft)
- Lowest elevation: 179 m (587 ft)
- Population (2023): 36
  - Density: 5.1/km^{2} (13/sq mi)
- Time zone: UTC+01:00 (CET)
  - Summer (DST): UTC+02:00 (CEST)
- INSEE/Postal code: 2B116 /20250
- ^{1} French Land Register data, which excludes lakes, ponds, glaciers > 1 km^{2} (0.386 sq mi or 247 acres) and river estuaries.

Focicchia is a commune in the Haute-Corse department of France on the island of Corsica.

== Population ==
Historical population
| Year | Pop. | ±% p.a. |
|---|---|---|
| 1968 | 54 | — |
| 1975 | 48 | −1.67% |
| 1982 | 34 | −4.81% |
| 1990 | 22 | −5.30% |
| 1999 | 30 | +3.51% |
| 2007 | 40 | +3.66% |
| 2012 | 36 | −2.09% |
| 2017 | 26 | −6.30% |
| 2023 | 36 | +5.57% |
Source: INSEE

== See also ==
- Communes of the Haute-Corse department
