= Sant'Andréa-di-Bozio =

- Commune
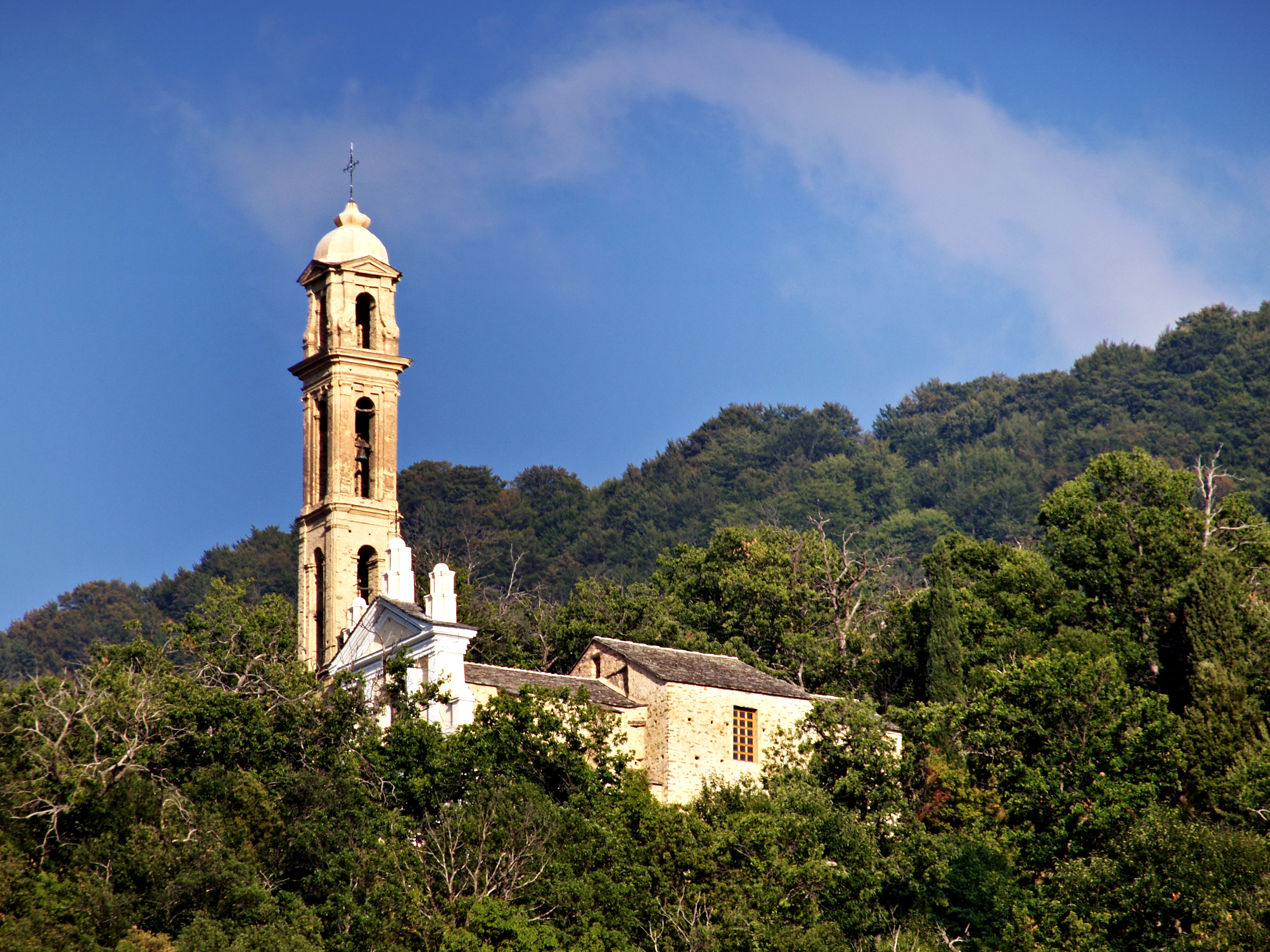
- The church of Saint-André, in Sant'Andréa-di-Bozio
- Location of Sant'Andréa-di-Bozio
- Location within France Location within Corsica
- Coordinates: 42°17′55″N 9°18′12″E
- Country: France
- Region: Corsica
- Department: Haute-Corse
- Arrondissement: Corte
- Canton: Golo-Morosaglia

Government
  - Mayor (2022–2026): Jean-Pierre Brunel
- Area^{1}: 24.03 km^{2} (9.28 sq mi)
- Elevation: 700 m (2,300 ft)
- Highest elevation: 1,233 m (4,045 ft)
- Lowest elevation: 297 m (974 ft)
- Population (2023): 55
  - Density: 2.3/km^{2} (5.9/sq mi)
- Time zone: UTC+01:00 (CET)
  - Summer (DST): UTC+02:00 (CEST)
- INSEE/Postal code: 2B292 /20212
- ^{1} French Land Register data, which excludes lakes, ponds, glaciers > 1 km^{2} (0.386 sq mi or 247 acres) and river estuaries.

Sant'Andréa-di-Bozio is a commune in the Haute-Corse department of France on the island of Corsica.

== Population ==
Historical population
Year	Pop.	±% p.a.
1968	122	—
1975	106	−1.99%
1982	104	−0.27%
1990	63	−6.07%
1999	76	+2.11%
2007	85	+1.41%
2012	78	−1.70%
2017	72	−1.59%
2023	55	−4.39%
Source: INSEE

== See also ==
- Communes of the Haute-Corse department
