= Venaco =

Venaco U Serraghju
- Commune
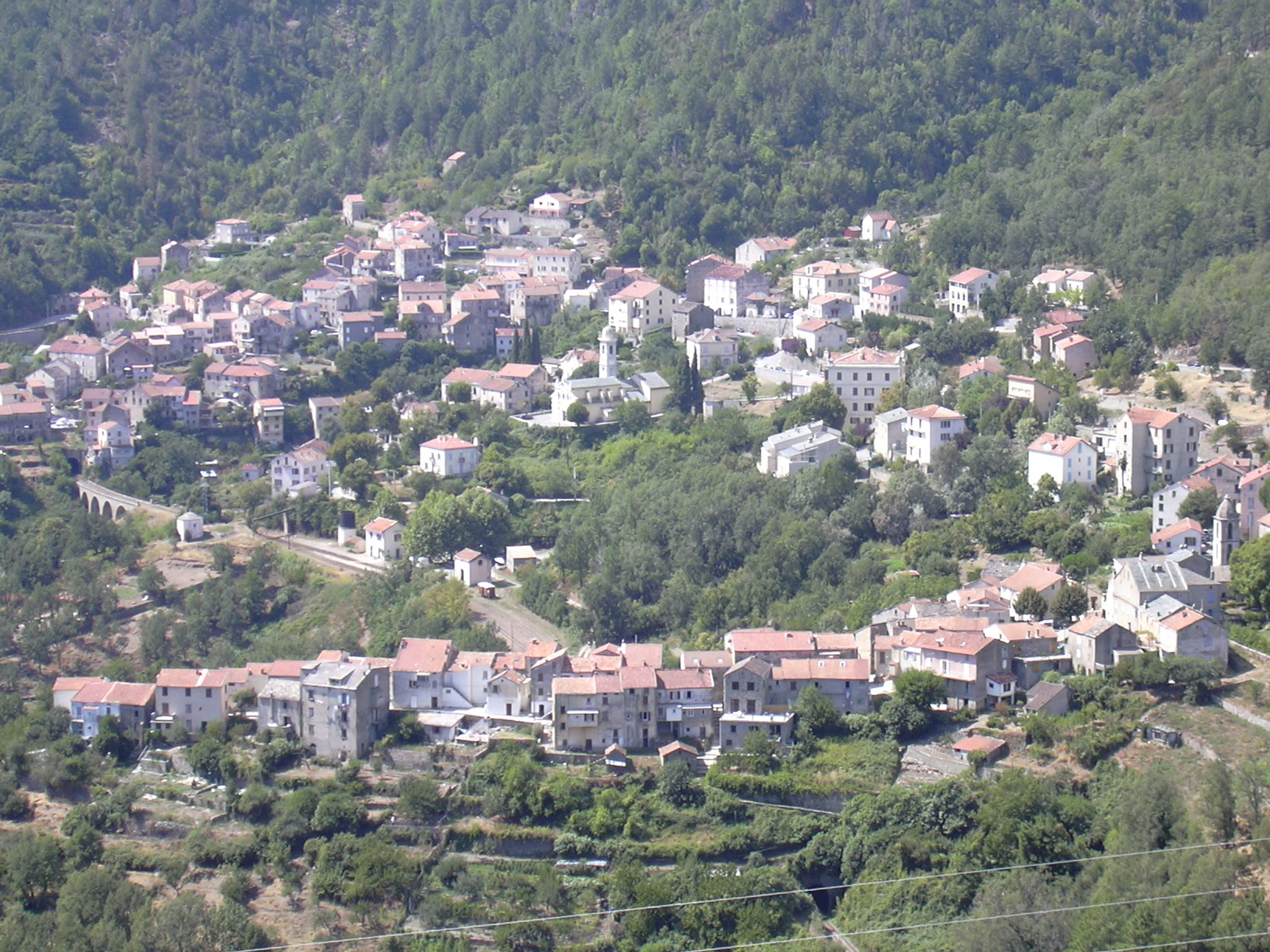
- The churches and surrounding buildings in Venaco
- Location of Venaco
- Location within France Location within Corsica
- Coordinates: 42°13′03″N 9°10′24″E
- Country: France
- Region: Corsica
- Department: Haute-Corse
- Arrondissement: Corte
- Canton: Corte

Government
  - Mayor (2022–2026): David Piferini
- Area^{1}: 53.72 km^{2} (20.74 sq mi)
- Highest elevation: 2,626 m (8,615 ft)
- Lowest elevation: 198 m (650 ft)
- Population (2023): 644
  - Density: 12.0/km^{2} (31.0/sq mi)
- Time zone: UTC+01:00 (CET)
  - Summer (DST): UTC+02:00 (CEST)
- INSEE/Postal code: 2B341 /20231
- ^{1} French Land Register data, which excludes lakes, ponds, glaciers > 1 km^{2} (0.386 sq mi or 247 acres) and river estuaries.

Venaco is a commune in the Haute-Corse department of France on the island of Corsica.

== Geography ==
Venaco is on the Vecchio River with Mont Rotondo, 2,622 metres (8,602 ft) to the west and Mont Cardo, 2,543 metres (8,343 ft) on the north. It contains Lake Bellebone.

== Population ==
Historical population
Year	Pop.	±% p.a.
1968	886	—
1975	715	−3.02%
1982	747	+0.63%
1990	614	−2.42%
1999	657	+0.75%
2007	745	+1.58%
2012	763	+0.48%
2017	711	−1.40%
2023	644	−1.64%
Source: INSEE

== Transport ==
The town is served by a station on the Corsican Railways.

== See also ==
- Communes of the Haute-Corse department
