= Erbajolo =

- Commune
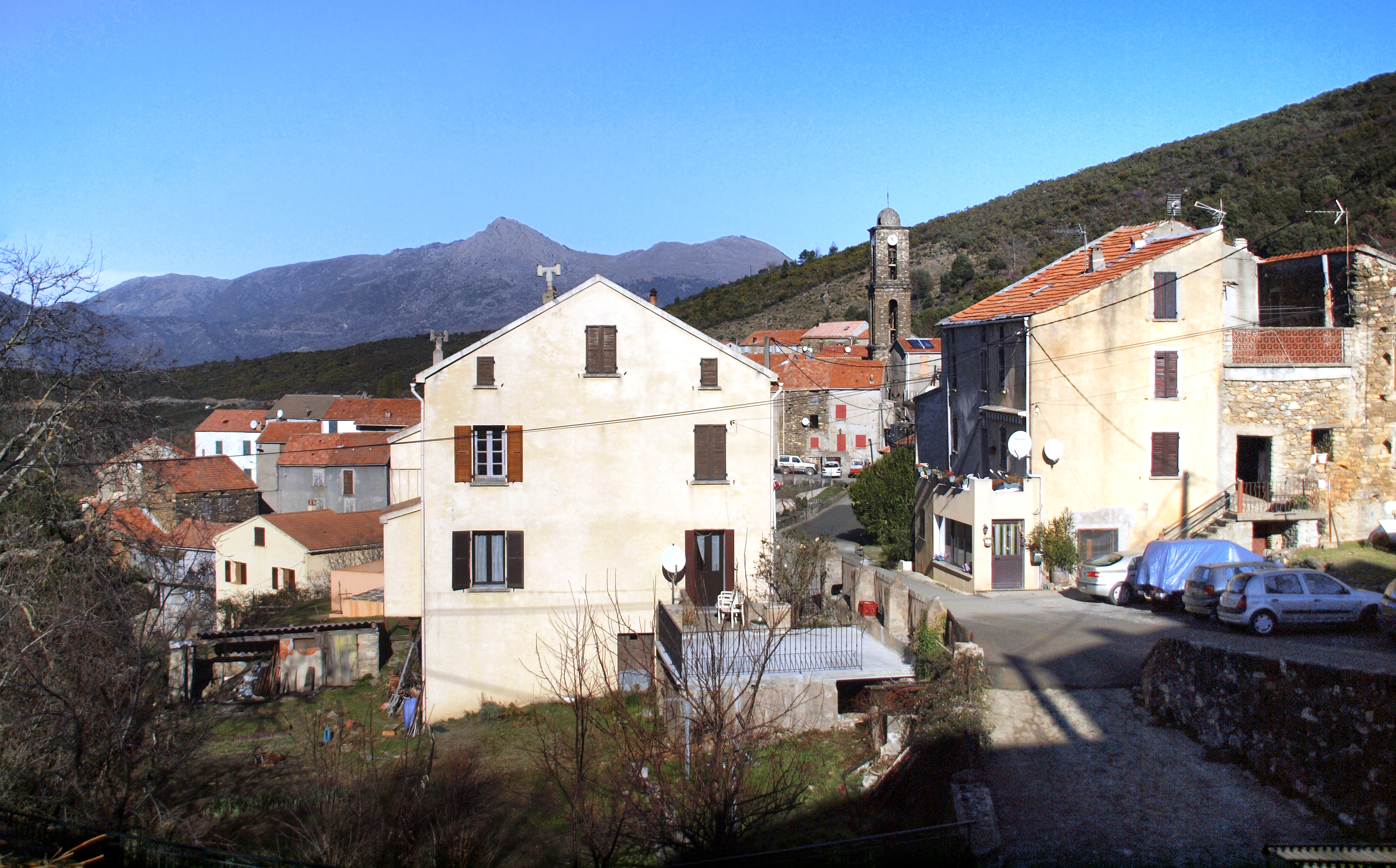
- A general view of Erbajolo
- Location of Erbajolo
- Location within France Location within Corsica
- Coordinates: 42°15′54″N 9°17′02″E
- Country: France
- Region: Corsica
- Department: Haute-Corse
- Arrondissement: Corte
- Canton: Golo-Morosaglia

Government
  - Mayor (2020–2026): Mathieu Mariani
- Area^{1}: 15.45 km^{2} (5.97 sq mi)
- Elevation: 750 m (2,460 ft)
- Highest elevation: 924 m (3,031 ft)
- Lowest elevation: 180 m (590 ft)
- Population (2023): 90
  - Density: 5.8/km^{2} (15/sq mi)
- Time zone: UTC+01:00 (CET)
  - Summer (DST): UTC+02:00 (CEST)
- INSEE/Postal code: 2B105 /20212
- ^{1} French Land Register data, which excludes lakes, ponds, glaciers > 1 km^{2} (0.386 sq mi or 247 acres) and river estuaries.

Erbajolo is a commune in the Haute-Corse department of France on the island of Corsica.

== Population ==
Historical population
Year	Pop.	±% p.a.
1968	132	—
1975	137	+0.53%
1982	101	−4.26%
1990	90	−1.43%
1999	92	+0.24%
2007	108	+2.02%
2012	104	−0.75%
2017	110	+1.13%
2023	90	−3.29%
Source: INSEE

== Monuments ==
- Église Saint-Martin d'Erbajolo

== See also ==
- Communes of the Haute-Corse department
