= Piedicorte-di-Gaggio =

- Commune
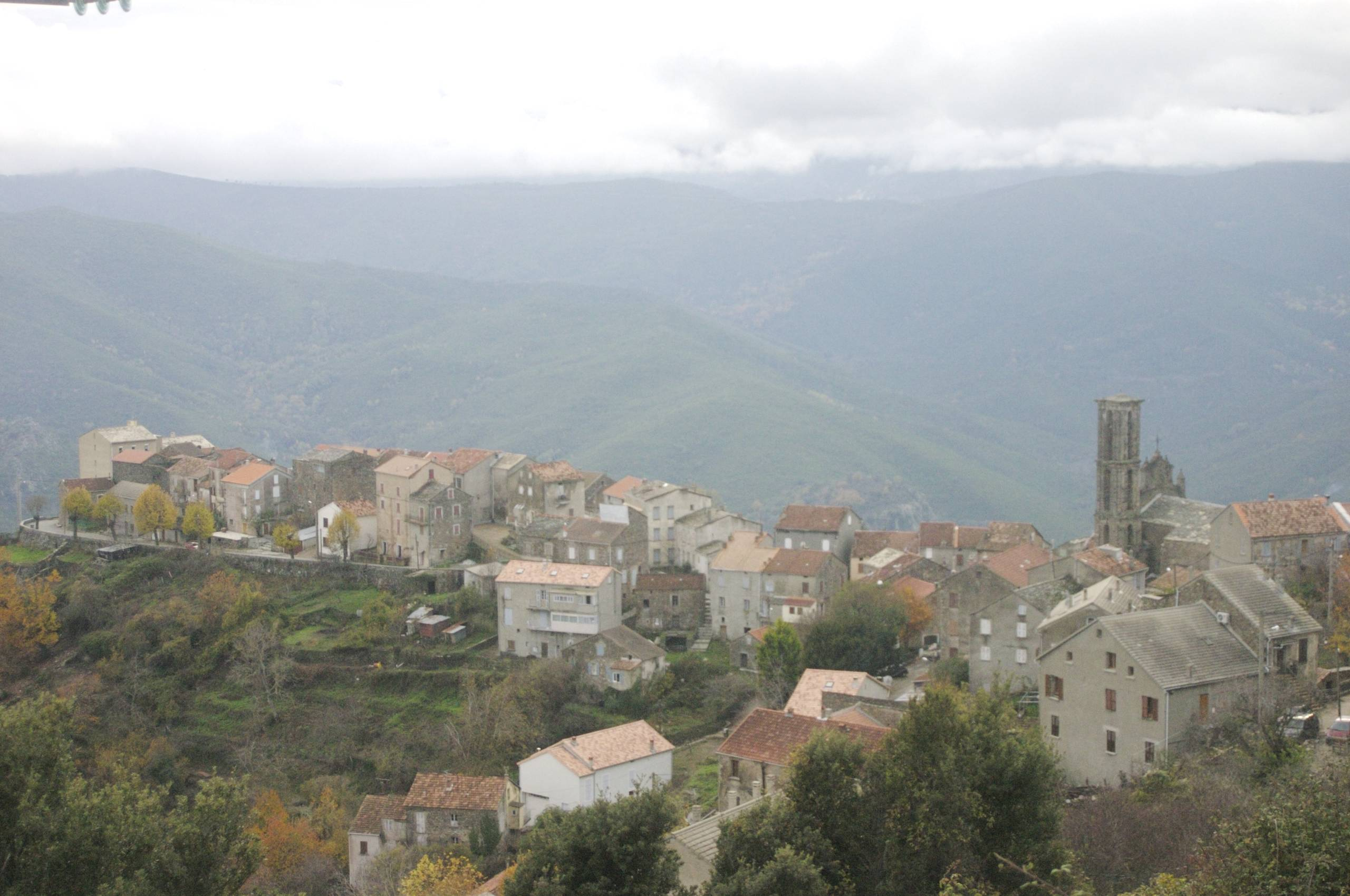
- A view of Piedicorte-di-Gaggio
- Location of Piedicorte-di-Gaggio
- Location within France Location within Corsica
- Coordinates: 42°14′12″N 9°19′45″E
- Country: France
- Region: Corsica
- Department: Haute-Corse
- Arrondissement: Corte
- Canton: Ghisonaccia

Government
  - Mayor (2020–2026): Jean Marie Antonetti
- Area^{1}: 27.25 km^{2} (10.52 sq mi)
- Elevation: 740 m (2,430 ft)
- Highest elevation: 1,192 m (3,911 ft)
- Lowest elevation: 100 m (330 ft)
- Population (2023): 114
  - Density: 4.18/km^{2} (10.8/sq mi)
- Time zone: UTC+01:00 (CET)
  - Summer (DST): UTC+02:00 (CEST)
- INSEE/Postal code: 2B218 /20251
- ^{1} French Land Register data, which excludes lakes, ponds, glaciers > 1 km^{2} (0.386 sq mi or 247 acres) and river estuaries.

Piedicorte-di-Gaggio (Italian: Piedicorte di Gaggio; Corsican: Pedicorti di Caghju) is a commune in the Haute-Corse department of France on the island of Corsica.

== Population ==
Historical population
Year	Pop.	±% p.a.
1968	194	—
1975	182	−0.91%
1982	135	−4.18%
1990	129	−0.57%
1999	127	−0.17%
2007	119	−0.81%
2012	103	−2.85%
2017	97	−1.19%
2023	114	+2.73%
Source: INSEE

== See also ==
- Communes of the Haute-Corse department
