= Aullène =

Commune in Corsica, France

- Commune
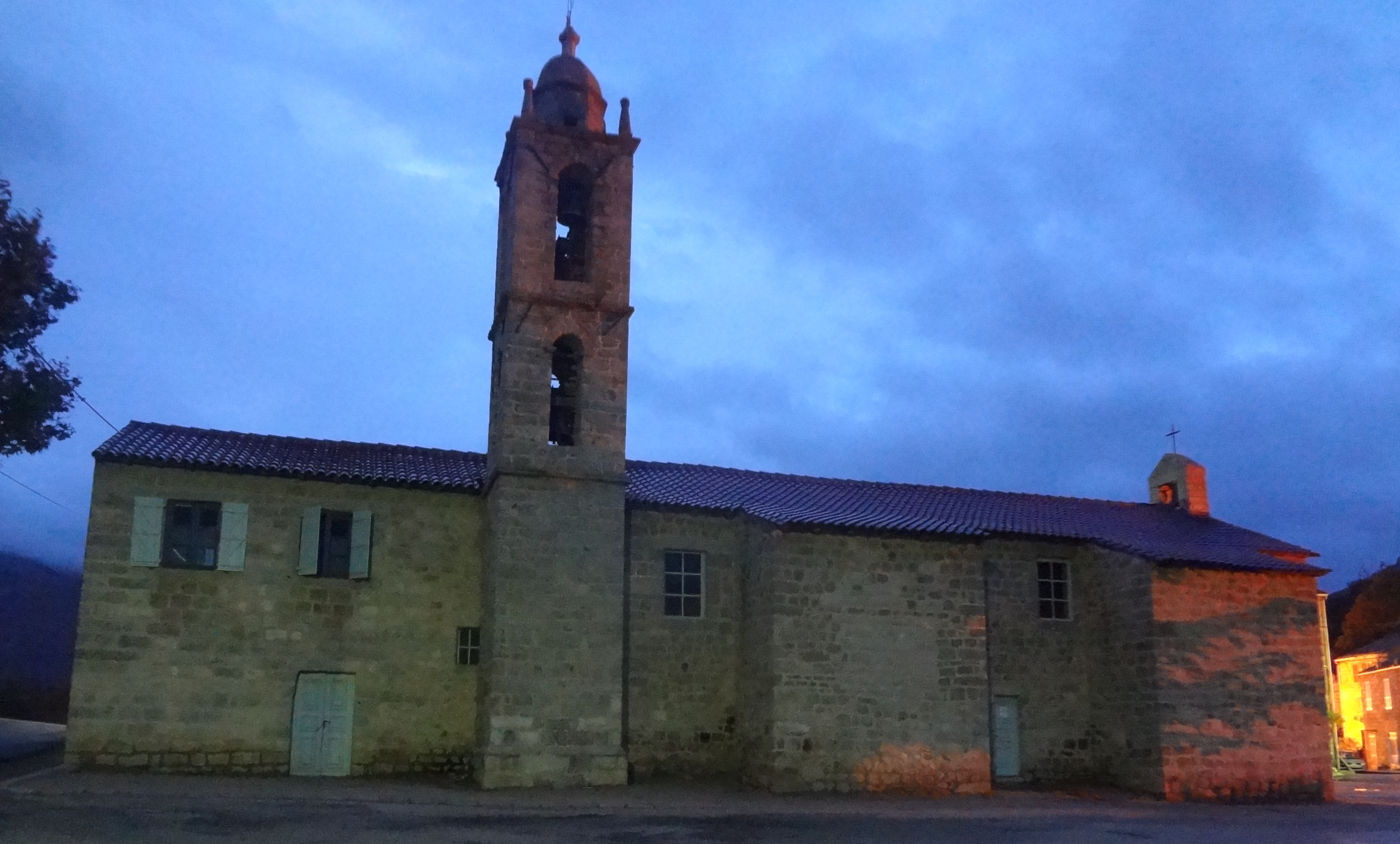
- Church of Saint-Nicolas
- Location of Aullène
- Location within France Location within Corsica
- Coordinates: 41°46′23″N 9°04′54″E
- Country: France
- Region: Corsica
- Department: Corse-du-Sud
- Arrondissement: Sartène
- Canton: Sartenais-Valinco
- Intercommunality: CC Alta Rocca

Government
  - Mayor (2020–2026): Pierre Castellani
- Area^{1}: 40.92 km^{2} (15.80 sq mi)
- Elevation: 850 m (2,790 ft)
- Highest elevation: 1,724 m (5,656 ft)
- Lowest elevation: 629 m (2,064 ft)
- Population (2023): 184
  - Density: 4.50/km^{2} (11.6/sq mi)
- Time zone: UTC+01:00 (CET)
  - Summer (DST): UTC+02:00 (CEST)
- INSEE/Postal code: 2A024 /20116
- ^{1} French Land Register data, which excludes lakes, ponds, glaciers > 1 km^{2} (0.386 sq mi or 247 acres) and river estuaries.

Aullène (French pronunciation: [olɛn]; Corsican: Auddè; Italian: Aullene) is a commune in the Corse-du-Sud department of France on the island of Corsica.

== Geography ==
Aullène is located some 35 km in a direct line (68 km by road) south-east of Ajaccio, 20 km in a direct line (36 km by road) north-east of Propriano, and 10 km in a direct line (21 km by road) east by south-east of Petreto-Bicchisano. Aullène is a mountain village with a pastoral tradition whose territory is in the upper part of a valley parallel to and south of the Taravo valley. Access to the commune is by road D420 from Serra-di-Scopamène in the south-east to the village in the south of the commune then continuing west by a tortuous route to Petreto-Bicchisano. The D69 road comes from Cargiaca in the south by a tortuous road to the village then continues north from the village through the length of the commune, then goes west across the Col de la Vaccia before continuing north to Zicavo.

The village is at an altitude of 850 metres on the left bank of the Chiuvone (in Corsican Chjuvonu). It extends around two "pogs" (or poghji in Corsican) and is dominated by the Punta Ariola, a summit of 1,449 metres. The Chjuvonu river, called Le Fleuve (The River) by locals, rises on the Cuscionu plateau, which marks the north by north-eastern border of the commune, and passes near the village before continuing its course towards south by south-west towards the Rocca region and joins the Rizzanese below Zoza.

Ridge lines, including the main summit of Punta di Sistaja (1,724 metres), are the natural boundaries of the village to the east, north and west while the Col de la Tana delimits the territory in the south by south-west.

== Toponymy ==
The name of the commune is Aullène in French and Audde' in Corsican - the accent after the "e" corresponds to a tone mark on the final "e" and not the French "é", it sounds almost like au|g|ddè.

In Corsican it sounds different depending on whether it is in the diquai (di qua dai monti) or in the dilai (di là dai monti). A simple test is to ask how to say grandmother and grandfather: if it is mammone and babbone that is in diquai; if it is minnana and missiavu then that is dilai. In addition, each micro-region has its idiosyncrasies and phonological features. Thus in the Alta Rocca region, which is a dilai area, the "ll" is strongly dentalised which turns it into a small palatal "d", hence the modern spelling Audde' instead of Aullé as written in the Terrier of Corsica in 1769.

There has been a myriad of suppositions made by scholars on the etymology of the name "Aullène".

Among the certainties, it is known that the people of Alta Rocca say Audde' and that the French geographers of the late 18th century used the name Aullène. Aullene is found written on Italian acts in the 17th century. In the 16th century Auguliena appears in the detail of inhabited places in the Pieve of Talla.

In the village some have argued that the origin of the name comes from Ancient Greek meaning "crossroads" (in Greek diodos = "place where two roads meet"; triodos = "place where three roads meet"). The crossroads, however, are rather recent in Aullène as the road to Ajaccio was not opened until the end of the 19th century and completed in 1927.

Geographers in the late 18th century supported the Latin term meaning alder to give a French name to the village because they believed that the word had a rapport with the fragrance of alder in some mountain valleys (Alnus alnobetula subsp. suaveolens or u bassu in Corsican).

The term Auguliena was used in texts in the mid-16th century (see the research by Antoine-Dominique Monti in Elements for a dictionary of proper names) meaning a "scan point" or "observation post". This solution is plausible as it was probably a fortified place in the 11th century and certainly in the 13th century when the Giudice (Sinucello Della Rocca was called the "Giudice of Cinarca") monitored and controlled the neighbouring lords.

== History ==
The village of Aullène lies in the heart of the Alta Rocca micro-region and is strongly influenced by an old pastoral tradition. Until just before the First World War, which cut off Corsican families from their traditional lives, the residents of Aullène moved with their cattle from the mountain pastures to the coast for the winter months during the rainy season or the impiaghiera then went back to their summer pastures in the mountains or a muntanera before the onset of malaria-carrying mosquitoes. Between Monacia-d'Aullène, the summer village, and Aullène is Ghjanuciu - now a hamlet which was well populated until recent times. Ghjanuciu was a stop at the foot of the Montagen de Cagna on the Transhumance way for the shepherds. It is therefore not surprising to find the same families in the three villages. It was not only individual property that was shared between two villages - part of the land owned by the commune of Aullène on the Cuscionu was in joint ownership with Monacia-d'Aullène and some coastal lands in Monacia-d'Aullène was also ij joint ownership with Aullène. Livestock breeding was so important in the commune that the parish feast on the first Sunday of August continued to be the largest cattle fair in the region until the Second World War.

In 2010 there were 464 permanent residents in Monacia-d'Aullène, from which the hamlet of Aullène separated to be an independent commune in 1870, and 182 in Aullène. These figures can increase fivefold or more when the so-called "Corsican diaspora" come to spend the summer at the village.

In July 2009 a fire destroyed some 3,500 hectares of forest from the hamlet of Burgu (Propriano) to the Col de Vaccia (Aullène). According to police investigations the fire was caused by work done on an electrical line at Burgu.

== Administration ==
List of Successive Mayors

From	To	Name	Party	Position
1948	1983	Blanchard Lucchini		Pharmacist
1983	2006	Michel Martini	REG	Teacher
2006	2026	Pierre Castellani		Entrepreneur

== Demography ==
The inhabitants of the commune are known as Auddaninchi.

Historical population

Year	Pop.	±% p.a.
1800	868	—
1806	642	−4.90%
1821	901	+2.29%
1831	1,033	+1.38%
1836	1,104	+1.34%
1841	1,100	−0.07%
1846	1,229	+2.24%
1851	1,443	+3.26%
1856	1,412	−0.43%
1861	1,494	+1.14%
1866	780	−12.19%
1872	888	+2.18%
1876	914	+0.72%
1881	1,064	+3.09%
1886	1,036	−0.53%
1891	1,172	+2.50%
1896	1,148	−0.41%
1901	1,240	+1.55%

Year	Pop.	±% p.a.
1906	1,201	−0.64%
1911	1,533	+5.00%
1921	1,579	+0.30%
1926	1,636	+0.71%
1931	2,004	+4.14%
1936	2,113	+1.06%
1946	2,050	−0.30%
1954	1,663	−2.58%
1962	334	−18.18%
1968	315	−0.97%
1975	246	−3.47%
1982	176	−4.67%
1990	149	−2.06%
1999	138	−0.85%
2007	179	+3.31%
2012	184	+0.55%
2017	187	+0.32%
2023	184	−0.27%

Source: EHESS and INSEE

== Culture and heritage ==
=== Civil heritage ===
The commune has a large number of buildings and structures that are registered as historical monuments:

- House 103 (17th century)
- House 10 (17th century)
- House 11 (1694)
- House 12 (19th century)
- House 16 (1883)
- House 18 (1872)
- House 20 (1878)
- House 22 (1872)
- House 24 (1839)
- House 25 (19th century)
- House 26 (1697)
- House 28 (19th century)
- House 30 (1835)
- House 32 (1843)
- House 33 (19th century)
- House 34 (19th century)
- House 37 (1846)
- House 3 (1922)
- House 51 (18th century)
- House 53 (19th century)
- House 58 (1901)
- House 66 (19th century)
- House 71 (1885)
- House 74 (19th century)
- House 75 (19th century)
- House 8 (19th century)
- House 91 (19th century)
- House 96 (19th century)
- House 99 (19th century)
- House 9 (1842)
- War Memorial (20th century)
- Houses (17th-20th centuries)
- Chiuvonu Bridge (19th century)
- La Liberté Fountain (1881).

The fountain has a Statue of Marianne (1863) that is registered as an historical object.

Other sites of interest

- A Fortified place from the 11th century north-east of the centre of the village at a place called "Vastellare" is a small summit on which was built a fortress - probably in the eleventh century. This position is located above the current D69 road, which was a former pathway descending from Zicavo which was widely used by people in Transhumance. At a place called Castellare (or Casteddaru in Corsican) the site of the castle can be reached by the remains of a very old stone staircase.
- A Fortified place from the 13th century, lower than "Castellare" on a hillock planted with chestnut trees around which part of the village extends (Campanaju on the Geoportal map). This was the stronghold built by Giudice di Cinarca (or his real name Sinucello Della Rocca) who unified the island in its entirety in a short time. The position on the Campanaghju allowed Sinucello Della Rocca, who was in perpetual conflict with the lords of Levie and Carbini, to monitor movements on the Zicavo to Levie road and he was able to withdraw to an easily defensible position.

=== Religious heritage ===
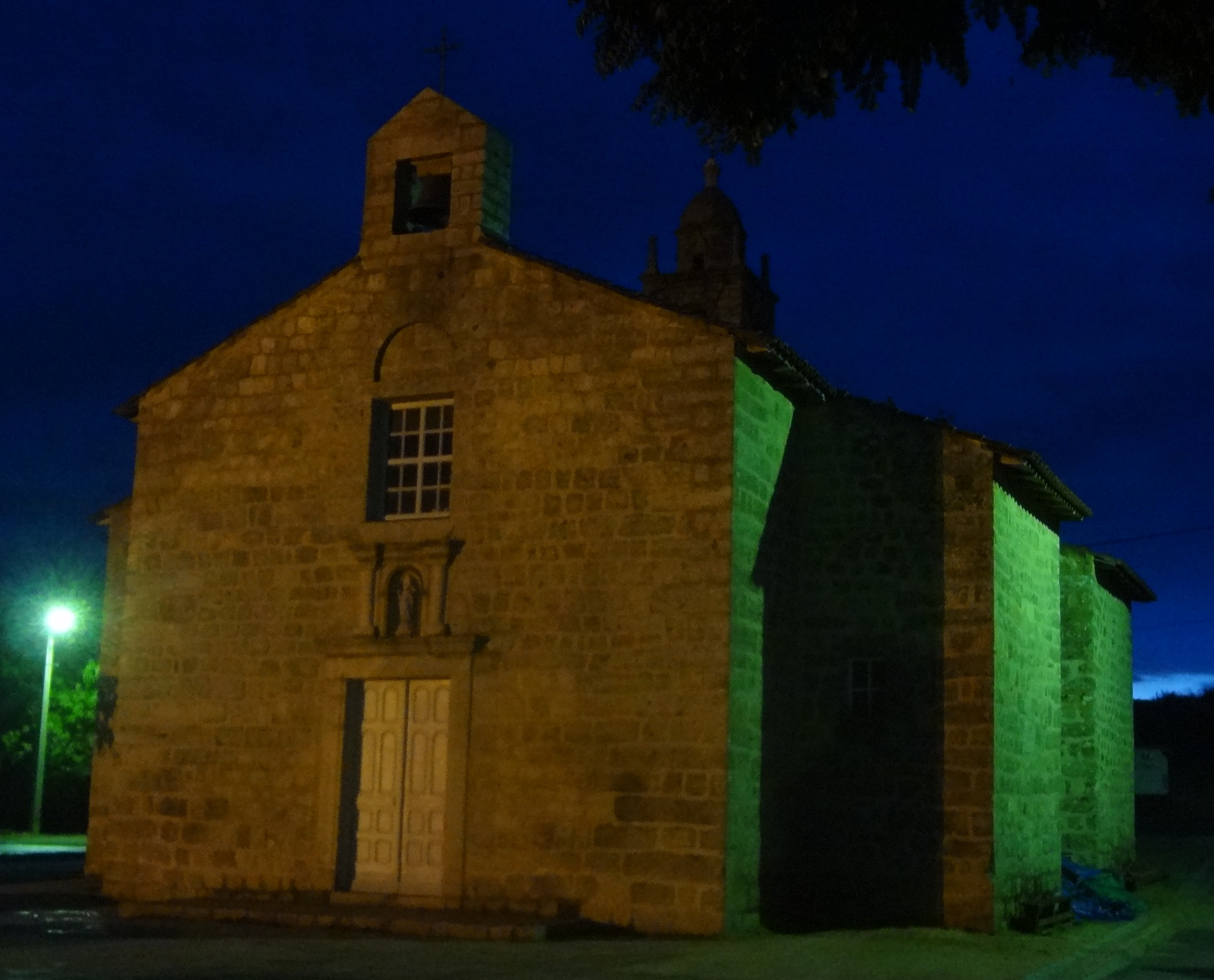
Church of Saint-Nicolas entrance

The commune has two religious buildings that are registered as historical monuments:

- The Chapel of Saint-Antioche (1820). The Catholic community in the village every first Sunday in August leads the representation of the Saint in procession from the church to celebrate the Transfiguration in contribution to the village festival. The "Fiera di Sant'Antiochu" (Saint Antioch Fair) in Aullène was one of the largest cattle fairs in Corsica until the Second World War. The Chapel contains two items that are registered as historical monuments:
  - Altar, Tabernacle, Stoup, Altar Pulpit, 4 Candlesticks, 2 Statues, and a book
  - A Painting: Intercession of the Virgin and Child for the souls in Purgatory (19th century)
- The Parish Church of Saint-Nicolas (19th century). The Parish Church has many items which are registered as historical objects:
  - A Pulpit
  - The Furniture in the Church
  - The Furniture in the Sacristy (19th century)
  - 12 Stalls (19th century)
  - A Celebrant Chair (19th century)
  - A Tabernacle in the main Altar (19th century)
  - Baptismal fonts (19th century)
  - A Cope decorated in gold (19th century)
  - A Chasuble, Stole, and Maniple decorated in gold (19th century)
  - A Corporal Burse, Chasuble, and Maniple decorated in gold (19th century)
  - A Chasuble, Maniple, and Chalice cover decorated in gold (19th century)
  - A Chalice (No. 3) (19th century)
  - A Chalice (No. 2) (19th century)
  - A Chalice (No. 1) (19th century)
  - A Pulpit (18th century)
- The Protestant Church was built in 1905 and remained active until the Second World War.

== Notable people linked to the commune ==
- Sinucello Della Rocca, called "Il Ghjudiciu di Cinarca" (1221-1306 or 1312) - In 1264 he accepted a form of constitution and succeeded in uniting the island around the end of the 13th century; his seat was at a fortified place on the heights of Aullène.
- Jean-Baptiste Natali (1883-1974) - Born in Aullène; writer; teacher, prosecutor of the Republic; author of Nos Géorgiques (Our Georgics) (1921), Parmi le thym et la rosée (Among the Thyme and the dew) (1934), a study on the Alta Rocca dialect, and La Poésie dialectale du peuple corse (The Dialectical poetry of the Corsican people) (1961).
- Pierre-Dominique Lucchini, known by the pen-name Pierre Dominique (1889-1973) - journalist and politician; author of Chroniques corses (1926).
- Simon Dary or Simonu d'Auddè (1900-1978) - Born at Monacia-d'Aullène; poet, prose writer, and writer of fables (text, poetry, and plays); author of Filosofia, cumediola in dui atti è sei sceni (1965) and Risa Corsa (1977).
- Pierre Rossi (1920-2002) - Born at Aullène; writer and philosopher; teacher and diplomat; author of L'Irak des révoltes (Revolts in Iraq) (1962), La Libye (Libya), La Tunisie de Bourguiba (The Tunisia of Bourguiba), "De Suez à Akaba" (From Suez to Aqaba), Le pétrole arabe dans la guerre (Arab oil in war), Les clefs de la guerre (The keys of war), La verte Libye de Khadafi (The green Libya of Qaddafi), La cité d'Isis, histoire vraie des Arabes (The City of Isis, a true history of Arabs) (1976), L'Irak, le pays du nouveau fleuve (Iraq, the country with long news), Un soir à Pise (An evening at Pisa), Les conjurés d'Aléria (The plotters of Aléria), U disturbu 1789-1989, la mise à sac (1989), La Corse, l'Europe et le droit (Corsica, Europe, and the right) (1991).
- Lucie Dolène (1931) - originally from Aullène; singer and comedian
- Jacques Chaban-Delmas, Prime Minister (1969-1972)
- Jean-Claude Gaudin, Senator-Mayor of Marseille

== See also ==
- Communes of the Corse-du-Sud department
