= Rizzanese Reservoir =

- Réservoir du Rizzanese (French)
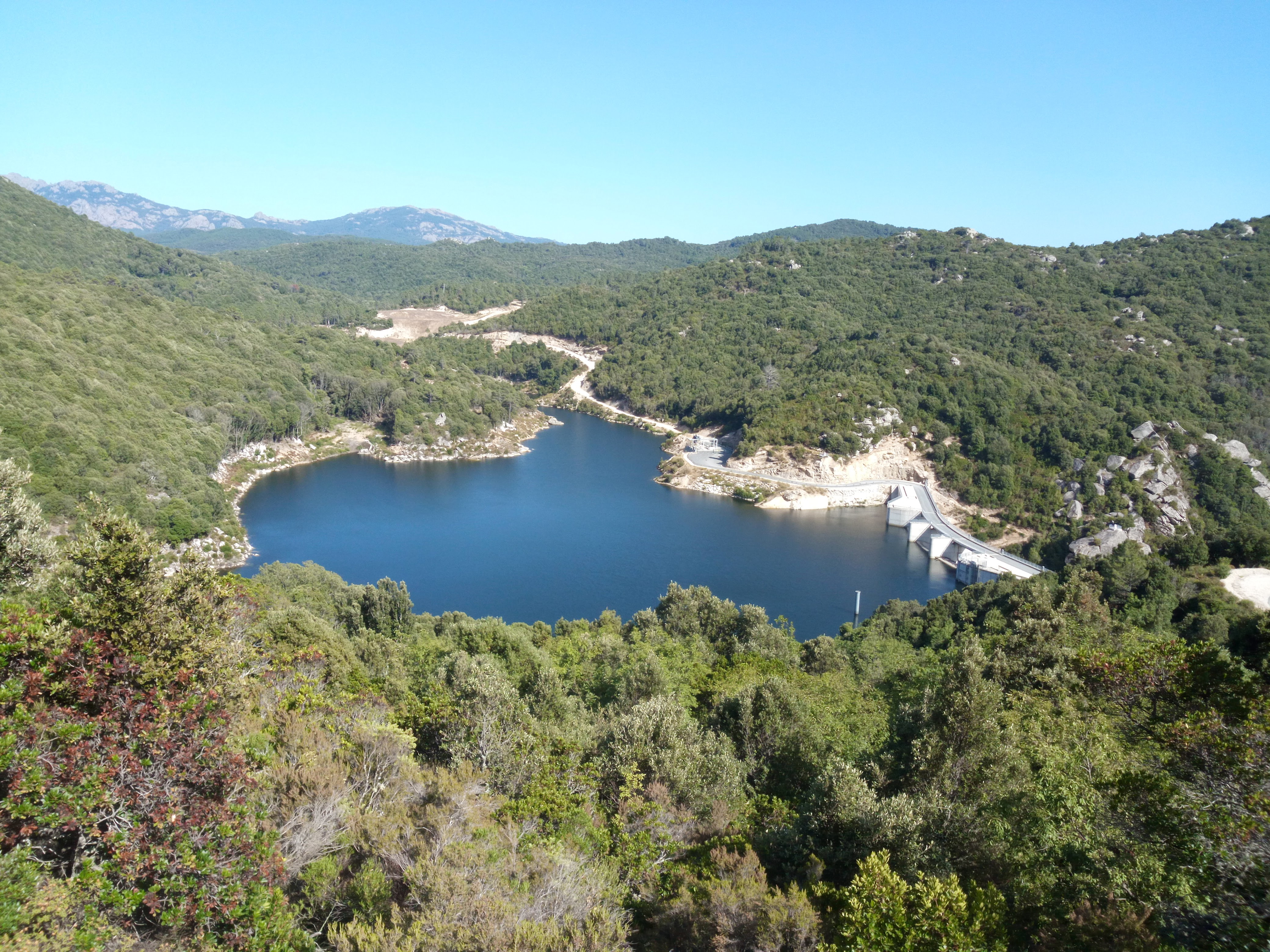
- Rizzanese Reservoir and dam

- Location within Corsica Location within France
- Location: Corse-du-Sud, Corsica
- Coordinates: 41.73589°N 9.11492°E
- Type: Lake
- Basin countries: France

The Rizzanese Reservoir (French: Réservoir du Rizzanese) is a reservoir in the Corse-du-Sud department of France on the island of Corsica. It stores water for irrigation, and supplies the largest hydroelectric power plant in Corsica, with installed capacity of 55 MW.

== Location ==
The reservoir is formed by a dam, the Barrage du Rizzanese, across the Rizzanese river. It is also fed by the Ruisseau de Codi. It is south of the village of Sorbollano. The D20 road runs close to the west of the reservoir. The river defines the boundary between the communes of Sorbollano and Levie, so the reservoir and dam are divided between the two communes.

== Dam ==
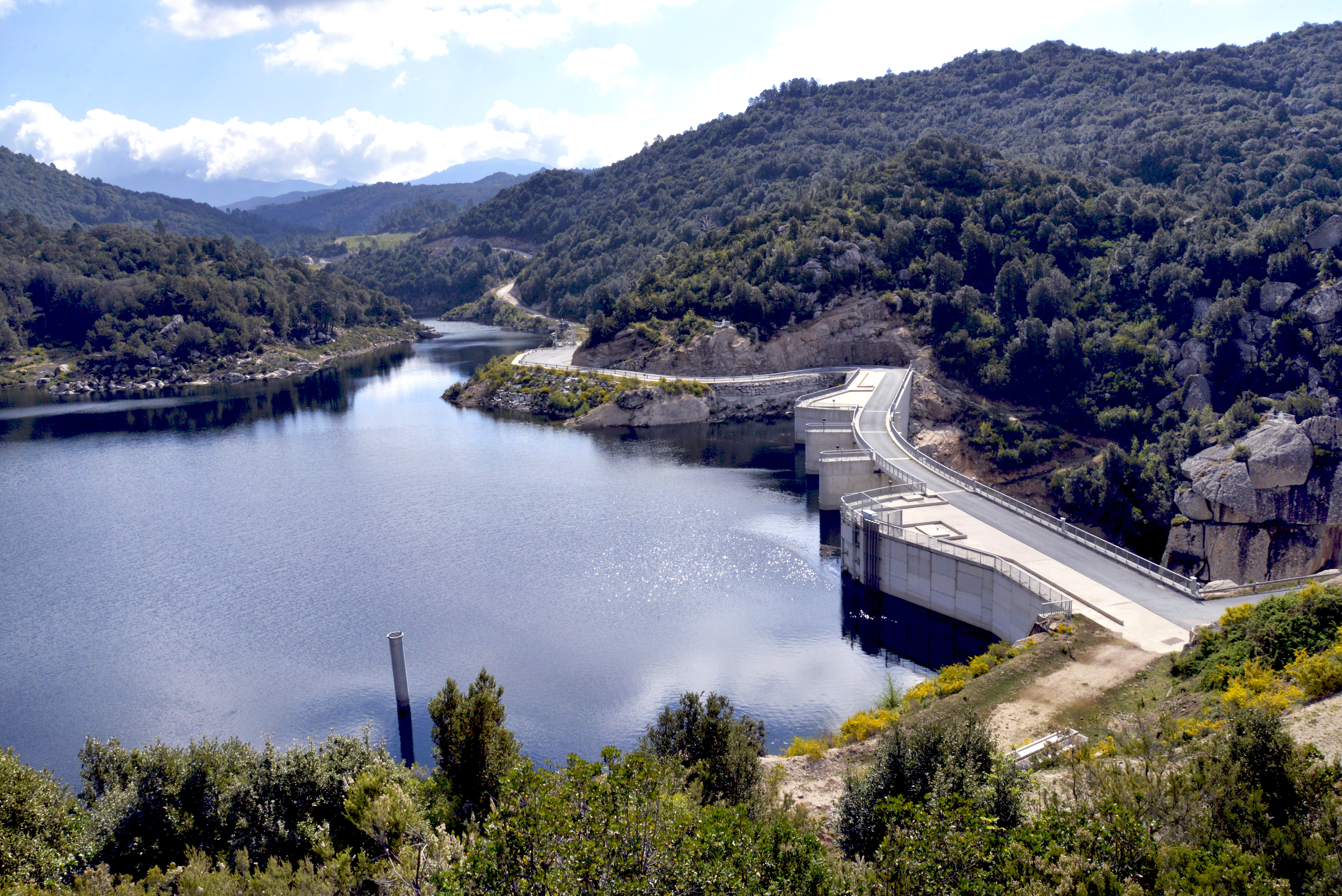
Barrage du Rizzanese

The dam is owned by Électricité de France (EDF). It is a gravity dam used for hydroelectricity generation and for irrigation. It is 41 metres (135 ft) high and 140 metres (460 ft) long. The foundation is 60 metres (200 ft) thick. A transfer conduit with a diameter of 4.2 metres (14 ft) and slope of 7% carries sediment from the reservoir to downstream from the dam.

The reservoir holds 1,000,000 cubic metres (35,000,000 cu ft) of water. It feeds a power plant 7 kilometres (4.3 mi) downstream. A tunnel carries water from the dam to the hydroelectric power station at Sainte Lucie de Tallano in the Levo plain. The power is delivered during daily peak periods of electricity consumption. With installed capacity of 55 MW the power plant delivers almost 40% of the island's hydroelectricity. Annual output is estimated at 80GWh.

== History ==
The dam was built to EDF's design by a consortium of Vinci Construction Terrassement, Corse Travaux (Eurovia) and Razel-Bec between 2008 and 2012. The Rizzanese is the fourth major hydroelectric development in Corsica. The others are on the rivers Prunelli (Tolla dam; Tolla, Ocana and Pont de la Vanna hydroelectric plants), Golo (Calacuccia dam; Sovenzia, Corscia and Castirla hydroelectric plants) and Fiumorbo (Sampolo dam; Trevadine hydroelectric plant).

Construction began in mid-2008. The tunnel to carry water from the dam to the power station was completed on 15 October 2010. On 21 May 2012 the dam was handed over to EDF to start filling the dam. Impoundment of the Rizzanese reservoir began on 23 May 2012. The first of two turbines was connected to the Corsican electricity network on 21 February 2013. Full commissioning was expected in mid-September 2013.

== See also ==
- List of waterbodies of Corse-du-Sud

== Sources ==
- Barrage du Rizzanese, EDF
- Filling the Rizzanese dam in Corsica, Vinci, 11 July 2012
- Gourbesville, Philippe; Cunge, Jean; Caignaert, Guy (26 February 2018), Advances in Hydroinformatics: SimHydro 2017 - Choosing The Right Model in Applied Hydraulics, Springer, ISBN 9789811072185
- Rizzanese, MD&A
- "Way: Réservoir du Rizzanese (373565402)", OpenStreetMap
