= Rizzanese =

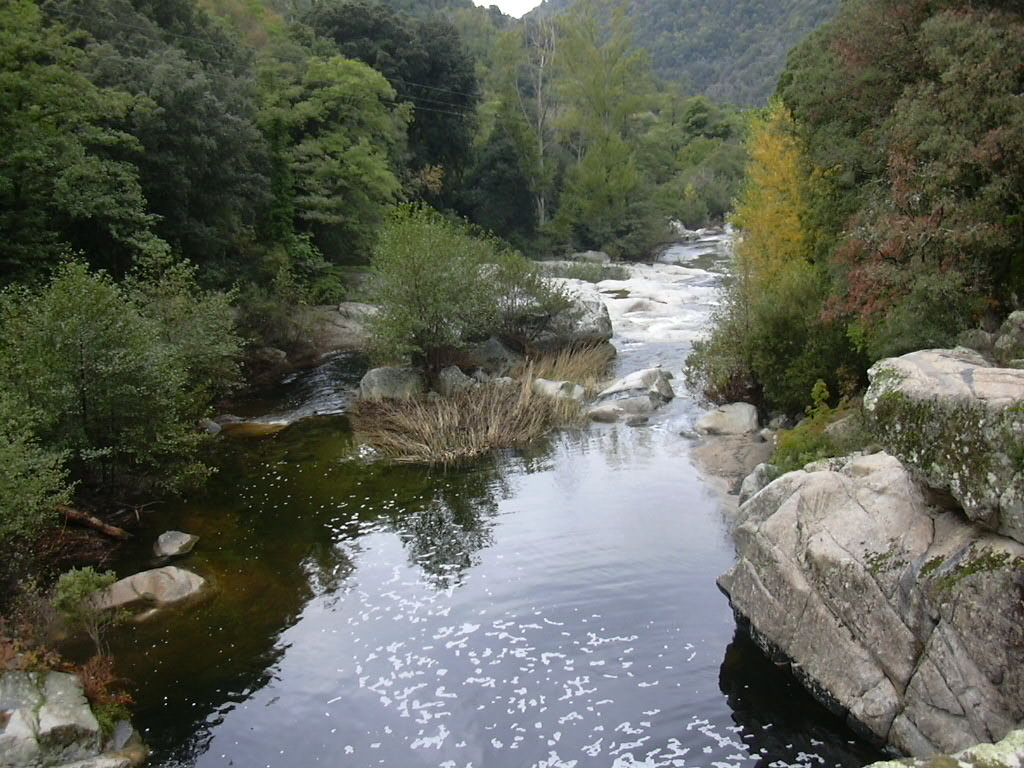
- Rizzanese in Summer 2004

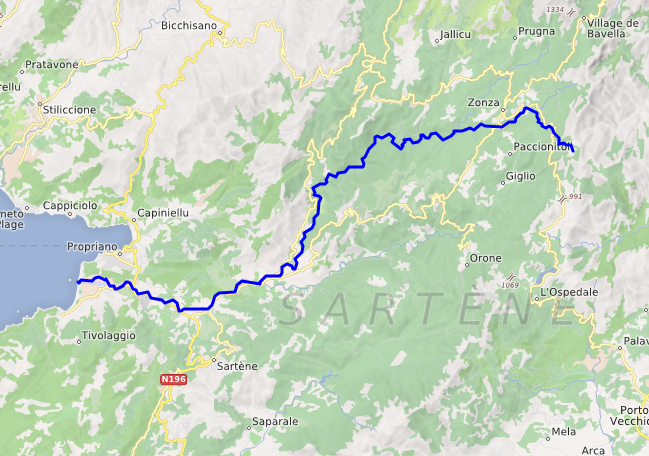
- Course of the Rizzanese

- Location within Corsica Location within France
- Native name: Rivière u Rizzanese (French)

Location
- Country: France
- Region: Corsica
- Department: Corse-du-Sud

Physical characteristics
- Mouth: Mediterranean Sea
  - coordinates: 41.6634°N 8.8798°E
- Length: 23.27 kilometres (14.46 mi)

The Rizzanese (French: Rivière u Rizzanese) is a coastal river in the southwest of department of Corse-du-Sud, Corsica, France. It is dammed near Sorbollano to form the Rizzanese Reservoir, which stores water for irrigation and supplies the largest hydroelectric power plant in Corsica, with installed capacity of 55 MW. It flows into the Mediterranean Sea near the town of Propriano.

== Course ==
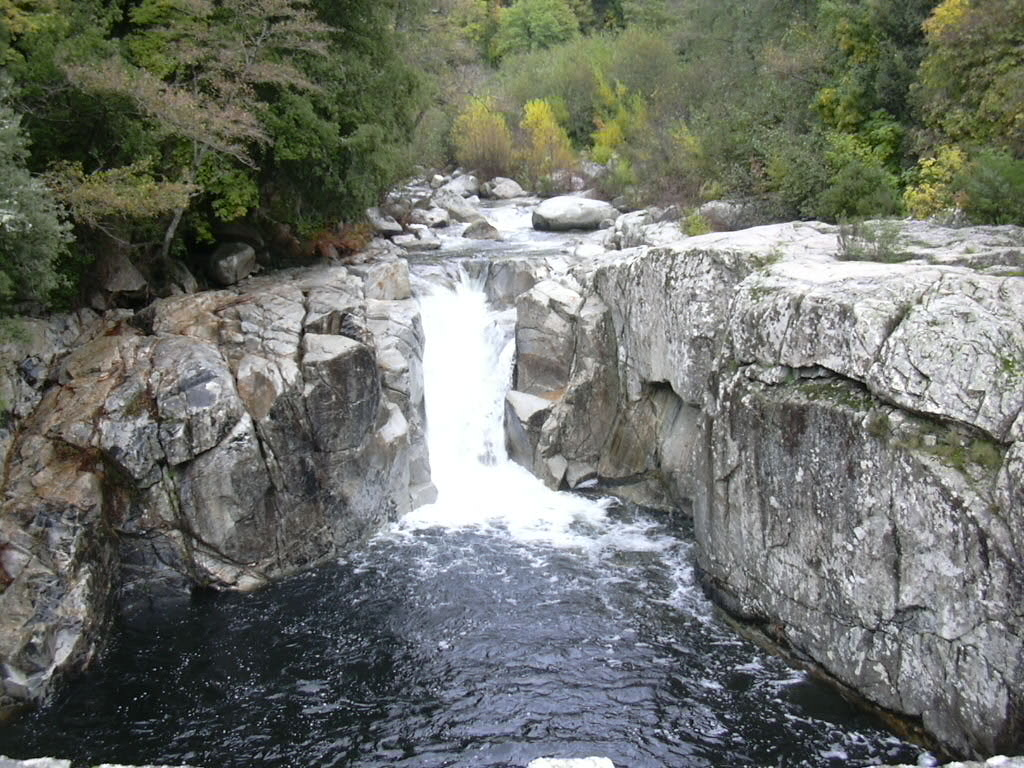
Rizzanese waterfall

The Rizzanese is 44.15 kilometres (27.43 mi) long, It crosses the communes of Arbellara, Cargiaca, Levie, Loreto-di-Tallano, Olmiccia, Propriano, Quenza, Sartène, Serra-di-Scopamène, Sorbollano, San-Gavino-di-Carbini, Sainte-Lucie-de-Tallano, Viggianello, Zonza and Zoza.

The Rizzanese rises in the commune of Zonza south of the 1,214 metres (3,983 ft) Castellucciu and north of the 1,381 metres (4,531 ft) Monte Calva. It flows northwest and then west past the village of Zonza, then flows west, southwest past Zoza and west again to enter the sea in the Golfe du Valinco just north of the Propriano Airport.

== Dam ==
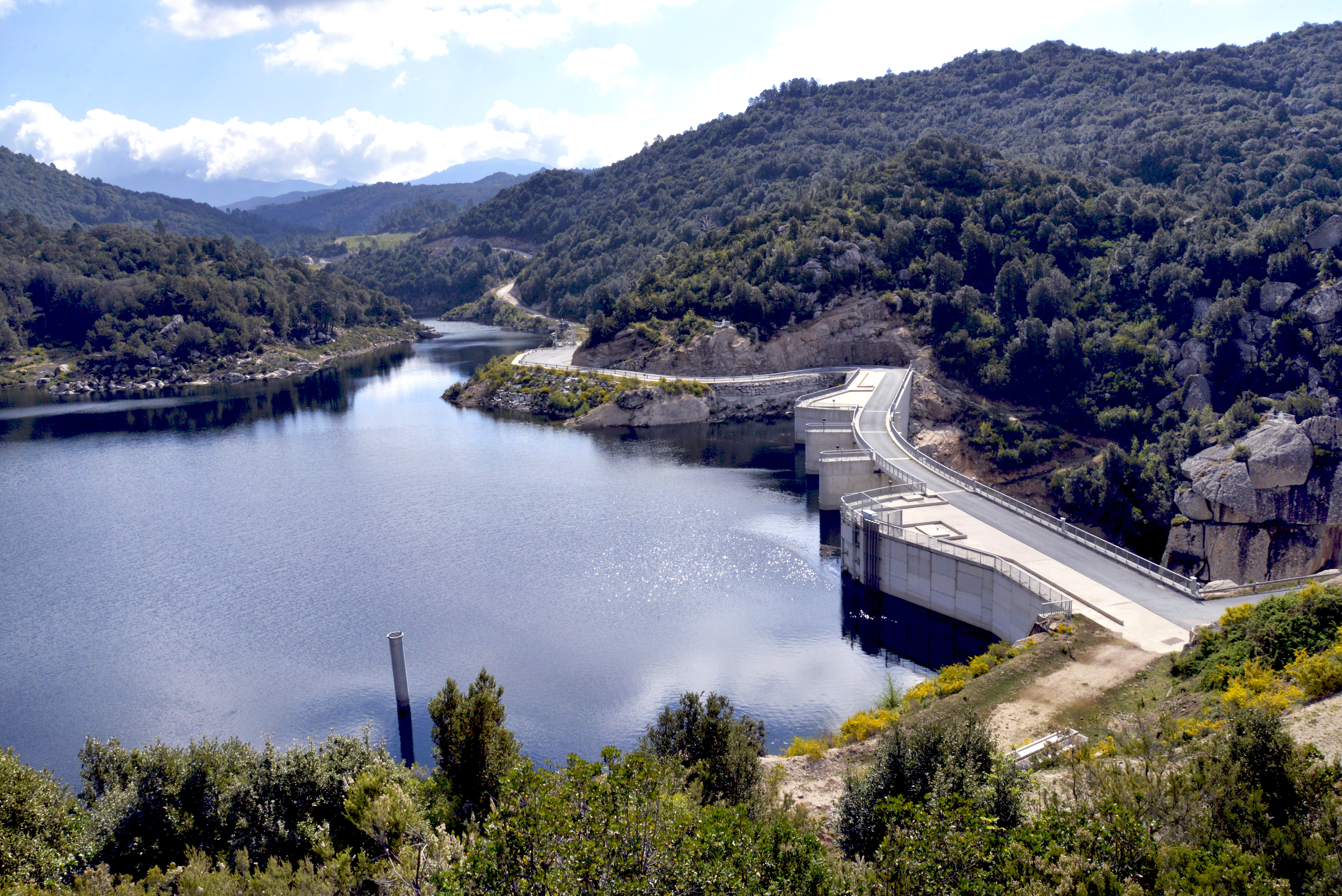
Barrage du Rizzanese

The river is dammed by the Barrage du Rizzanese to the south of the village of Sorbollano. The dam is owned by Électricité de France (EDF) and impounds 1,000,000 cubic metres (35,000,000 cu ft) of water. A tunnel carries water from the dam to the hydroelectric power station at Sainte Lucie de Tallano in the Levo plain. With installed capacity of 55 MW the power plant delivers almost 40% of the island's hydroelectricity.

Construction began in mid-2008. The tunnel to carry water from the dam to the power station was completed on 15 October 2010. On 21 May 2012 the dam was handed over to EDF to start filling the dam. Impoundment of the Rizzanese reservoir began on 23 May 2012. The first of two turbines was connected to the Corsican electricity network on 21 February 2013. Full commissioning was expected in mid-September 2013.

== Hydrology ==
Measurements of the river flow were taken near its mouth at the Pont de Rena Bianca station in Propriano between 2018 and 2021. The watershed above this point covers 382 square kilometres (147 sq mi). The maximum daily flow was 131 cubic metres (4,600 cu ft) of water, recorded on 24 January 2021.

Measurements of the river flow were taken at the Zoza station from 1966 to 2021. The watershed above this station covers 130 square kilometres (50 sq mi). The maximum daily flow was 212 cubic metres per second (7,500 cu ft/s) recorded on 20 December 2016. Average annual precipitation was calculated as 804 millimetres (31.7 in). The average flow of water throughout the year was 3.3 cubic metres per second (120 cu ft/s).

Average flow (cubic meters per second) by month for the period 1966 to 2021
Month	Flow
Jan	5.330
Feb	5.900
Mar	5.300
Apr	5.210
May	3.640
Jun	1.470
Jul	0.672
Aug	0.548
Sep	0.662
Oct	1.760
Nov	3.480
Dec	5.770

== Tributaries ==
The 24 km (15 mi) Chiuvone river and the 24 km (15 mi) Fiumicicoli river are tributaries. The following streams (ruisseaux) are also tributaries of the Rizzanese (ordered by length) and sub-tributaries:

- Saint-Antoine: 19 km (12 mi)
  - Lavu Niellu et de Bavonu: 6 km (3.7 mi)
    - Truva: 3 km (1.9 mi)
      - Vicciulega: 1 km (0.62 mi)
    - Giavinaccio: 3 km (1.9 mi)
  - Altagnoli: 3 km (1.9 mi)
  - Muratellu: 2 km (1.2 mi)
  - Caracutu: 2 km (1.2 mi)
    - Donicelli: 1 km (0.62 mi)
  - Ceca la Volpe: 2 km (1.2 mi)
  - Tassu: 2 km (1.2 mi)
  - Cavadili: 2 km (1.2 mi)
  - Saparellu: 2 km (1.2 mi)
  - Acqua Dolce: 2 km (1.2 mi)
  - Paljacciu: 1 km (0.62 mi)
  - Aja Murata: 1 km (0.62 mi)
  - Scalella: 1 km (0.62 mi)
  - Aja Martinu: 1 km (0.62 mi)
  - Titinella: 1 km (0.62 mi)
- Codi: 18 km (11 mi)
  - San Petru: 8 km (5.0 mi)
    - Coscione: 4 km (2.5 mi)
      - Vinajolo: 3 km (1.9 mi)
    - Biturgia: 3 km (1.9 mi)
    - Chiarasgiola: 2 km (1.2 mi)
    - Cota: 1 km (0.62 mi)
    - Muzzasca: 1 km (0.62 mi)
    - Pascialella: 1 km (0.62 mi)
    - Funtana Grigia: 1 km (0.62 mi)
    - Mela Longa: 1 km (0.62 mi)
    - Jallicu: 1 km (0.62 mi)
- Campo Maggiore: 7 km (4.3 mi)
- Culiccia: 6 km (3.7 mi)
  - Verju: 2 km (1.2 mi)
- Erbajo: 6 km (3.7 mi)
  - Vignalella: 2 km (1.2 mi)
  - Minza: 2 km (1.2 mi)
- Argazavu: 5 km (3.1 mi)
- Canale: 4 km (2.5 mi)
- Neu: 4 km (2.5 mi)
  - Capula: 2 km (1.2 mi)
- Boda: 4 km (2.5 mi)
  - Bugnaju: 2 km (1.2 mi)
  - Jumenta: 2 km (1.2 mi)
- Turicciu: 4 km (2.5 mi)
- Figalata: 4 km (2.5 mi)
- Pieve: 3 km (1.9 mi)
- Furvicilla: 3 km (1.9 mi)
- Vetricelli: 3 km (1.9 mi)
- Giovangara: 3 km (1.9 mi)
- Aravena: 3 km (1.9 mi)
- Furciolu: 2 km (1.2 mi)
- Sadise: 2 km (1.2 mi)
- Bufaneru: 2 km (1.2 mi)
- la Giaga: 2 km (1.2 mi)
- Piubettu: 2 km (1.2 mi)
- Agnone: 1 km (0.62 mi)

== Sources ==
- Barrage du Rizzanese, EDF
- Filling the Rizzanese dam in Corsica, Vinci, 11 July 2012
- "Le Rizzanese à Propriano [Pont de Rena Bianca]", eaufrance (in French), Ministère de l'Ecologie, du Développement Durable et de l'Energie
- "Le Rizzanese à Zoza", eaufrance (in French), Ministère de l'Ecologie, du Développement Durable et de l'Energie
- "Relation: Rivière u Rizzanese (7391050)", OpenStreetMap
- "Rivière u Rizzanese", Sandre (in French)
- Rizzanese, MD&A
- "Way: Réservoir du Rizzanese (373565402)", OpenStreetMap
