= Chiuvone =

- Location within Corsica Location within France
- Native name: Chjuvonu (Corsican)

Location
- Country: France
- Region: Corsica
- Department: Corse-du-Sud

Physical characteristics
- Mouth: Rizzanese
  - coordinates: 41.71628°N 9.05148°E
- Length: 24.29 kilometres (15.09 mi)

Basin features
- Progression: Rizzanese→ Mediterranean Sea

The Chiuvone (or Chjuvonu, Scopamène) is a small river in the department of Corse-du-Sud, Corsica, France. It is a tributary of the river Rizzanese. There is a small hydroelectric power dam on the river.

== Course ==
The Chiuvone is 24.29 kilometres (15.09 mi) long. It crosses the communes of Aullène, Cargiaca, Serra-di-Scopamène, Zérubia, Zicavo and Zoza. The river has its source on the Coscione plateau at an altitude of 1,585 metres (5,200 ft). It rises in the commune of Aullène to the east of the 1,627 metres (5,338 ft) Taglio di Serra Longa. It flows northwest, then turns to flow southwest past the village of Aullène to its confluence with the Rizzanese west of the village of Zoza. The D69 road follows the river for most of its course.

The river has a good chemical condition and very good ecological condition. There are natural swimming pools and waterfalls to the north of the point where the D69 road crosses the river.

== Dam ==
There is a gravity dam on the Chiuvone to the west of Zérubia at an elevation of 560 metres (1,840 ft). It supplies the Microcentrale Chiuvone, or Microcentrale de Cargiaca, a small hydroelectric plant. The hydraulic head is 4.41 metres (14.5 ft). The plant has a capacity of 3.5 MW. The river is "réservé" above this point.

The hydroelectric project was authorized on 29 November 2002 by the prefect of Corse-du-Sud, to be operated by the Société Hydroélectrique Du Scopamene. A request by the Association nationale de protection des eaux et rivieres, truites-ombres-saumons to annul the order was rejected on 27 November 2003 by the Administrative Court of Bastia. A request by the same association on 10 February 2004 to overturn this decision was rejected by the Marseille Court of Appeal on 20 September 2007.

== Tributaries ==
The following streams (ruisseaux) are tributaries of the Chiuvone (ordered by length) and sub-tributaries:

- Anellu: 5 km (3.1 mi)
- Undella: 5 km (3.1 mi)
- Anovu: 4 km (2.5 mi)
- Burdellu Vecchiu: 4 km (2.5 mi)
- Jallicu: 4 km (2.5 mi)
- Bocca di Preggia: 3 km (1.9 mi)
- Giavingiolu: 3 km (1.9 mi)
- Piscia di Corbu: 3 km (1.9 mi)
- Arja Donica: 2 km (1.2 mi)
- Acqua di Noce: 2 km (1.2 mi)
- Tre Funtane: 2 km (1.2 mi)
- Menta: 2 km (1.2 mi)
- Petra Rossa: 2 km (1.2 mi)
  - Vetricciule: 3 km (1.9 mi)
  - Cavalletti: 1 km (0.62 mi)
    - Renola: 1 km (0.62 mi)
- Maragna: 1 km (0.62 mi)
- Pozzi: 1 km (0.62 mi)

== Sources ==
- 04MA00286, Inédit au recueil Lebon (in French), 20 September 2007
- "Le Chiuvone", Sandre (in French)
- Le Gall, Guillaume; Dany, Aude (11 December 2014), Étude de l'impact des classements de cours d'eau du bassin Corse (PDF) (in French), DREAL Corse – Agence de l’eau Rhône Méditerranée Corse
- "Microcentrale – Chiuvone", Sandre (in French)
- "Moyens de production electrique en Corse", OpenData Corsica (in French)
- "Piscines naturelles du Chiuvone au coeur de l'Alta Rocca", Bouger et Voyager (in French)
- "Annexe 1 : RNAOE 2027 pour les masses d'eau de surface", Projet d'état des lieux : Bassin de Corse (PDF) (in French), Comité de bassin corse, October 2019
- "Relation: Le Chiuvone (8474684)", OpenStreetMap
