= Fiumicicoli =

- Location within Corsica Location within France

Location
- Country: France
- Region: Corsica
- Department: Corse-du-Sud

Physical characteristics
- Mouth: Rizzanese
  - coordinates: 41.66113°N 9.00467°E
- Length: 24.06 kilometres (14.95 mi)

Basin features
- Progression: Rizzanese→ Mediterranean Sea

The Fiumicicoli (or Rivière u Fiumicicoli) is a river in the southeast of the department of Corse-du-Sud, Corsica, France. It is a tributary of the river Rizzanese.

== Course ==
The Fiumicicoli is 24.06 kilometres (14.95 mi) long. It crosses the communes of Carbini, Levie, Mela, Olmiccia, San-Gavino-di-Carbini, Sainte-Lucie-de-Tallano and Zonza. The river rises at an altitude of 899 metres (2,949 ft), and joins the Rizzanese at an altitude of 38 metres (125 ft). Its source is in the commune of Zonza to the west of the 1,381 metres (4,531 ft) Monte Calva. It flows in a generally southwest direction past the villages or hamlets of Carbona, Giglio, Gualdariccio and Carbini, then turns to the west to pass under the D69 road and join the Rizzanese to the southeast of Arbellara.

== Tributaries ==
The following streams (ruisseaux) are tributaries of the Fiumicicoli (ordered by length) and sub-tributaries:

- Salvatica: 8 km (5.0 mi)
- Leva: 5 km (3.1 mi)
- San Polu: 5 km (3.1 mi)
- Mezzane: 4 km (2.5 mi)
  - Ciscia: 2 km (1.2 mi)
  - Casavecchia: 2 km (1.2 mi)
- Petra Grossa: 4 km (2.5 mi)
- Vacca Morta: 4 km (2.5 mi)
  - Lamaja: 2 km (1.2 mi)
- Giallitaju: 4 km (2.5 mi)
- Vigne d'Allandi: 4 km (2.5 mi)
- Pagnanesa: 3 km (1.9 mi)
  - Canale: 2 km (1.2 mi)
- Petre Late: 3 km (1.9 mi)
- Ormellu: 3 km (1.9 mi)
- Fiorentina: 2 km (1.2 mi)
- Vitte Grosse: 2 km (1.2 mi)
- Buri: 1 km (0.62 mi)
- Tunau: 1 km (0.62 mi)
- Culumbella: 1 km (0.62 mi)

== Sources ==
- "Relation: Rivière u Fiumicicoli (8479471)", OpenStreetMap
- "Rivière u Fiumicicoli", Sandre (in French)
