= Lac de Calacuccia =

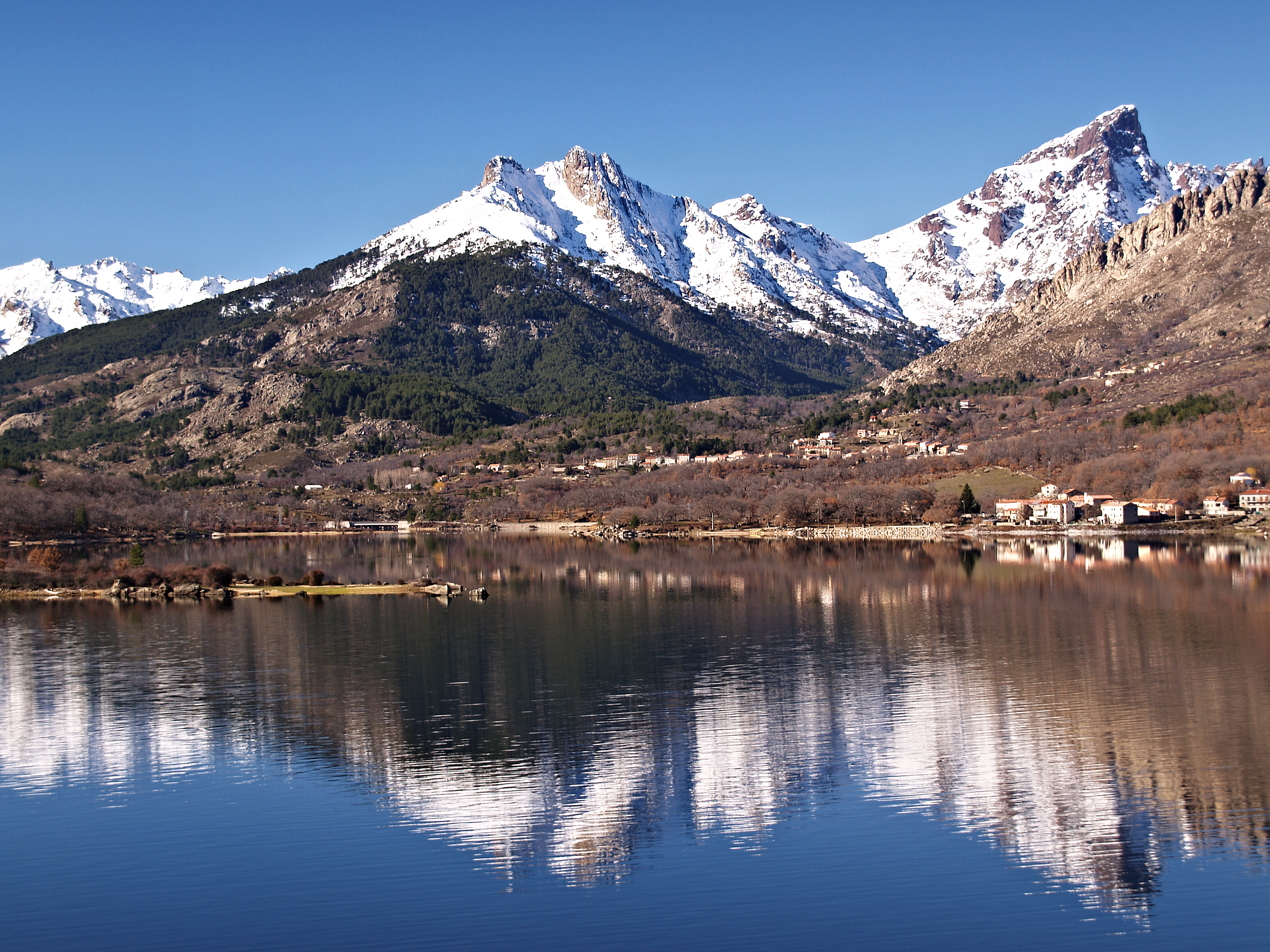
- Lac de Calacuccia and Albertacce village

- Location within Corsica Location within France
- Location: Corsica
- Coordinates: 42°19′35″N 9°00′35″E
- Type: Reservoir
- Primary inflows: Golo river
- Primary outflows: Golo river
- Basin countries: France
- Surface area: 1.196 km^{2} (0.462 sq mi)
- Surface elevation: 793 m (2,602 ft)

Lac de Calacuccia is a reservoir in the Haute-Corse department of France formed by damming the Golo river. It provides hydroelectric power and water for irrigation in the dry season.

== Location ==
The Lac de Calacuccia is formed by damming the Golo river just south of the village of Calacuccia. It is at an elevation of 793 metres (2,602 ft). The eastern part of the reservoir is in the canton of Calacuccia while the western part is in the commune of Casamaccioli. The northwest of the reservoir, where the Golo enters, is in the commune of Albertacce. Other inflows include the Ruisseau de Lavertacce and Ruisseau de Ruggi from the south, and the Ruisseau di u Mulinellu, Ruisseau de Sialari and Ruisseau de Vergoleilu from the north.

The lake is in the upper Golo valley in the heart of the Niolu region, a wild micro-region of the Parc naturel régional de Corse (Corsica Regional Natural Park). Surrounding peaks include Paglia Orba, Cinque Frati and Monte Cinto. The climate differs from the rest of Corsica due to its position in the center of the island and the surrounding high peaks. Summers are dry but cool, while winters are wet and temperate.

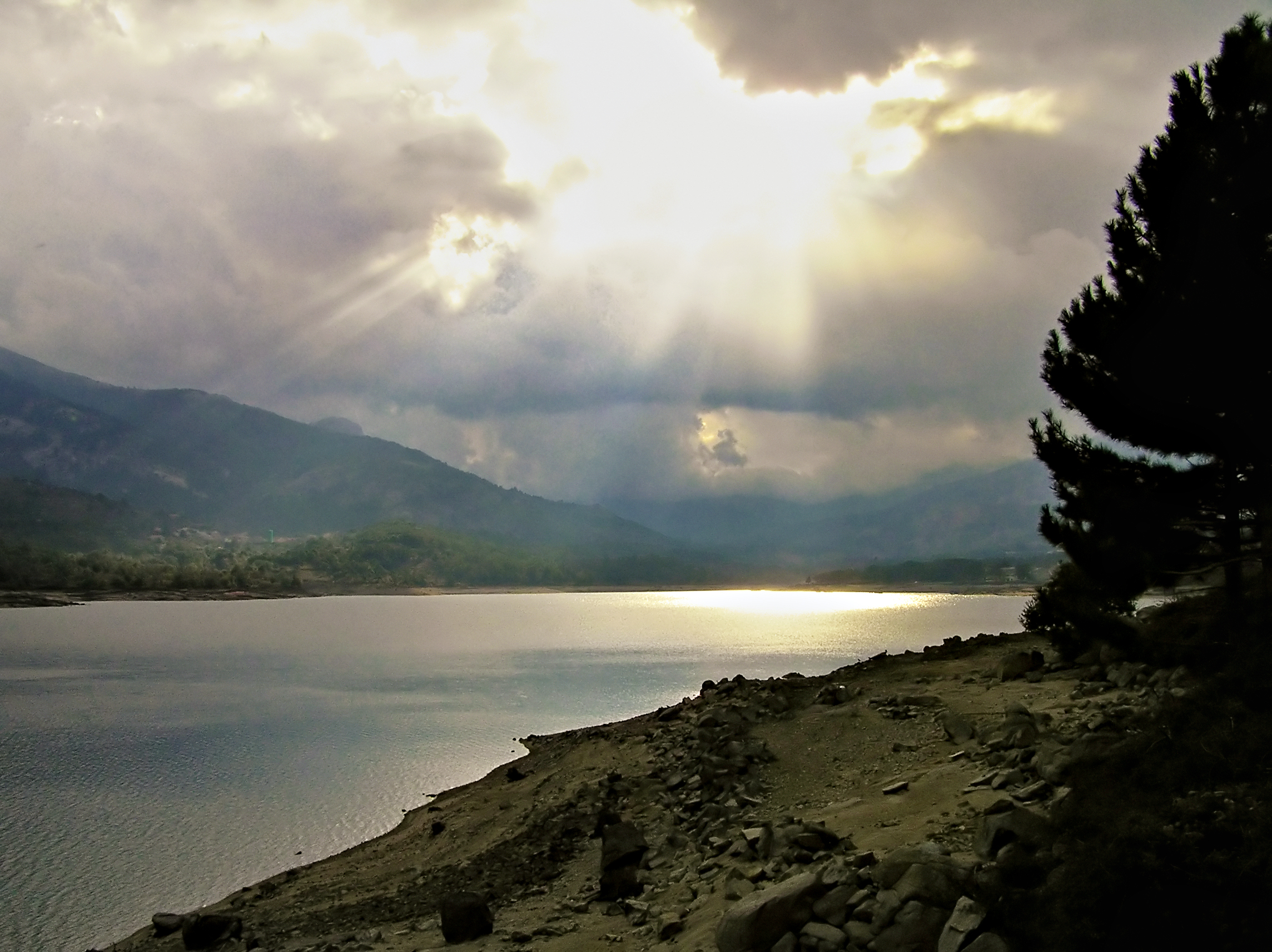
Stormy evening September 2005

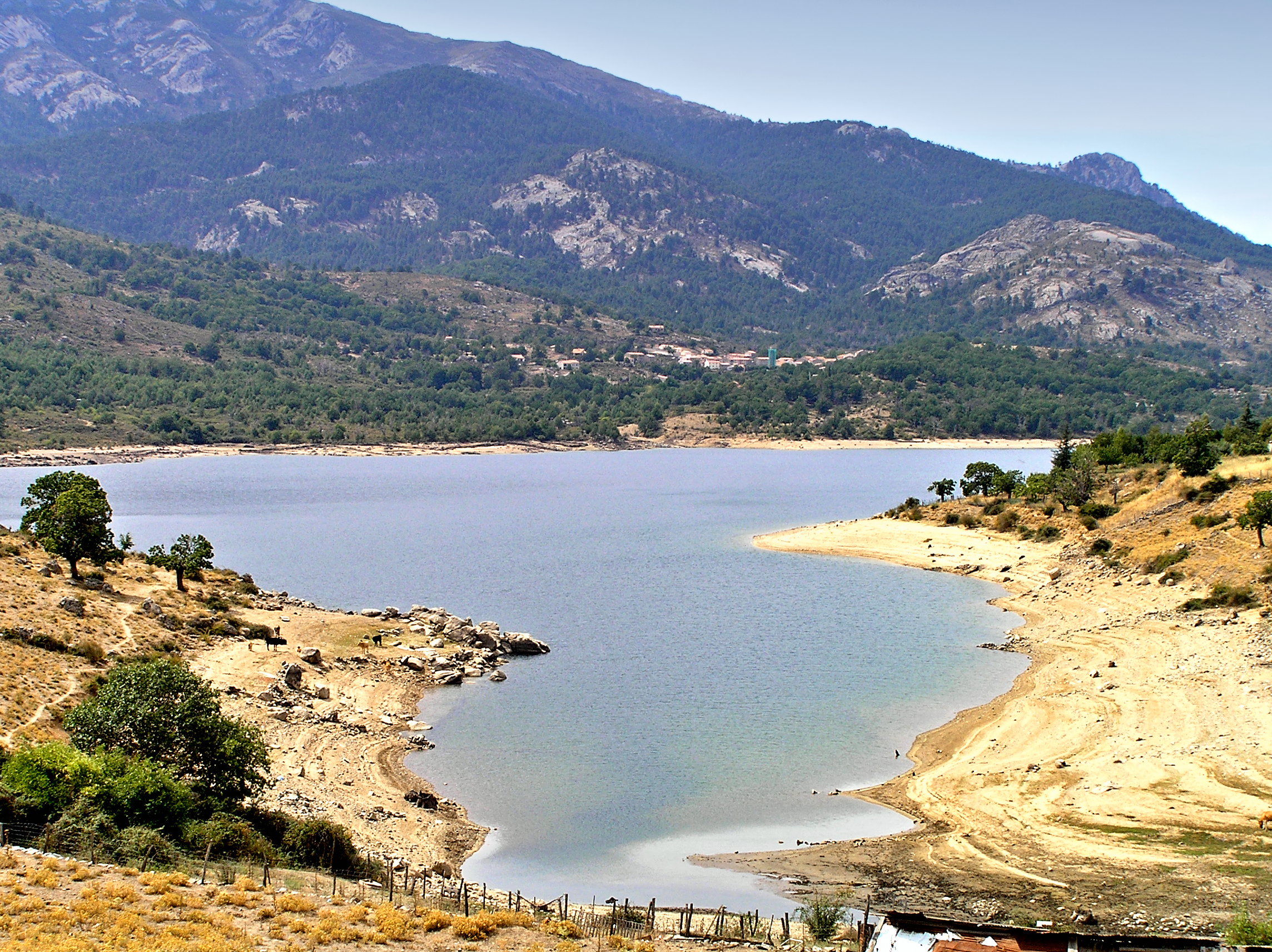
North shore low water August 2005

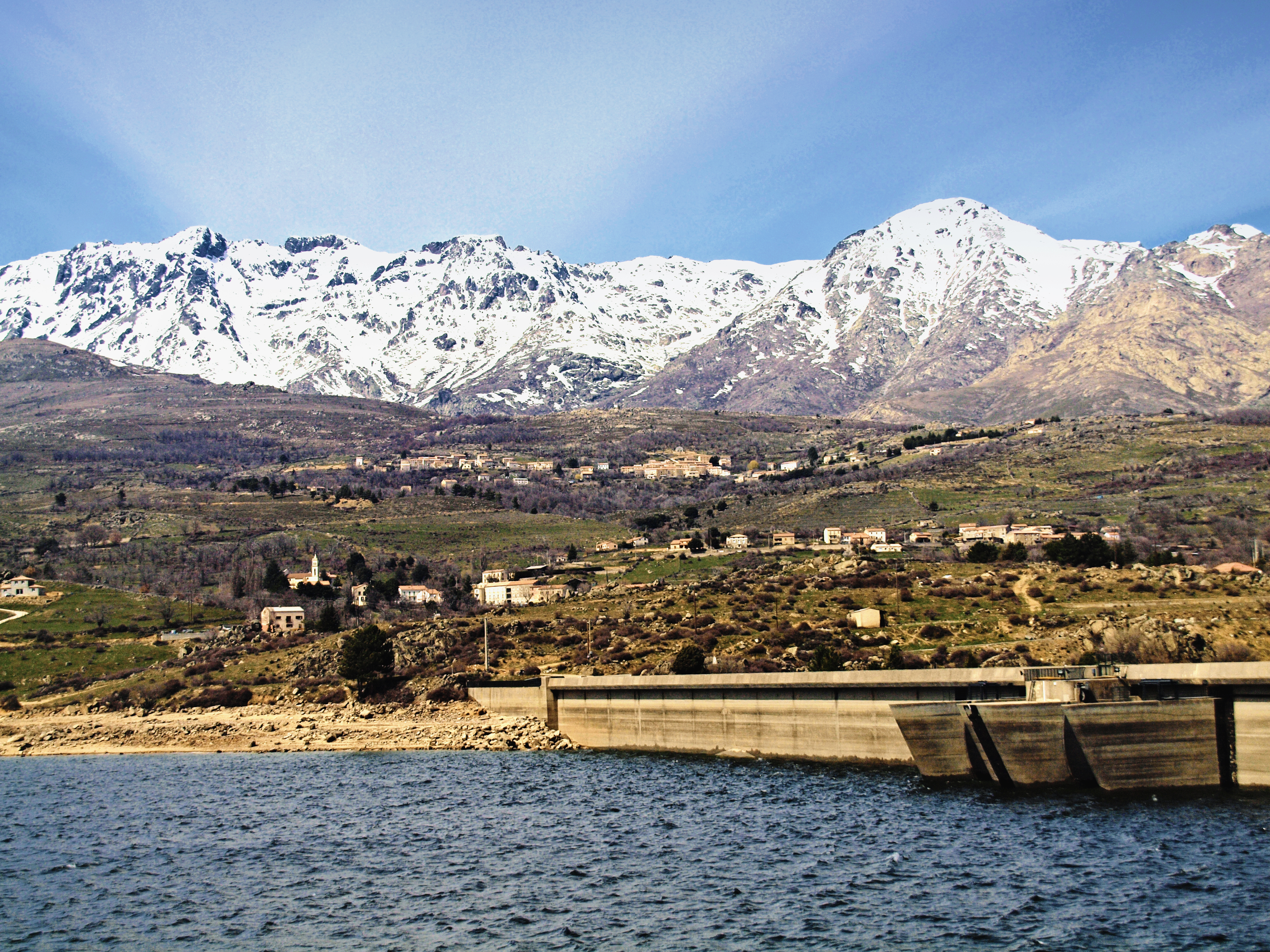
View upstream of dam during high water

== Ecology ==
The reservoir is of low biological interest. Flora includes Spanish juniper (Juniperus thurifera). Fauna include Geoffroy's bat (Myotis emarginatus), carrion crow (Corvus corone cornix), brown trout (Salmo trutta) and great green bush-cricket (Tettigonia viridissima).

== Dam ==
In August 1964 five hundred people led by all the elected representatives of the canton of Corte demonstrated against construction of the dam. They proclaimed "their fierce determination to oppose by all means in their power to the realization of this project, which, in its current conception, would lead to the ruin of the valley of their ancestors and cradle of their children". The dam would submerge 140 hectares (350 acres) of land, or which a quarter was planted with gardens and orchards. However, in January 1964 the departmental assembly had voted 52 to 5 in favour of the concessions requested by Électricité de France and the semi-public Société d'aménagement pour la mise en valeur de la Corse (Somivac) for the agricultural development of Corsica.

The Barrage de Calacuccia is a multiple arch dam used for hydroelectricity. The concrete dam was built between 1965 and 1968. It came into service in 1968. It has a crest length of 265 metres (869 ft) and crest altitude of 794 metres (2,605 ft). It has an estimated hydraulic head of 74 metres (243 ft) at low water. The dam impounds 23,400,000 cubic metres (830,000,000 cu ft) of water. The lake covers 119.6 hectares (296 acres) and is fed by a 127 square kilometres (49 sq mi) watershed. Fish cannot pass the dam.

The water is fed to turbines in two power plants in Corscia and Castirla, then returned to the Golo. The Barrage de Calacuccia is the most powerful hydroelectric facility in Corsica, generating 57 MW of the total 199 MW produced by hydroelectricity on the island. It provides 10% of the electricity consumed in Corsica. Every year 25,000,000 cubic metres (880,000,000 cu ft) of water are allocated to irrigation of cultivated land. Somivac takes the water at a dam at Prunelli-di-Casacconi, 40 kilometres (25 mi) downstream from the Calacuccia dam, to feed a network of pipes that supports irrigation of 10,000 hectares (25,000 acres) of land in the Bastia plains.

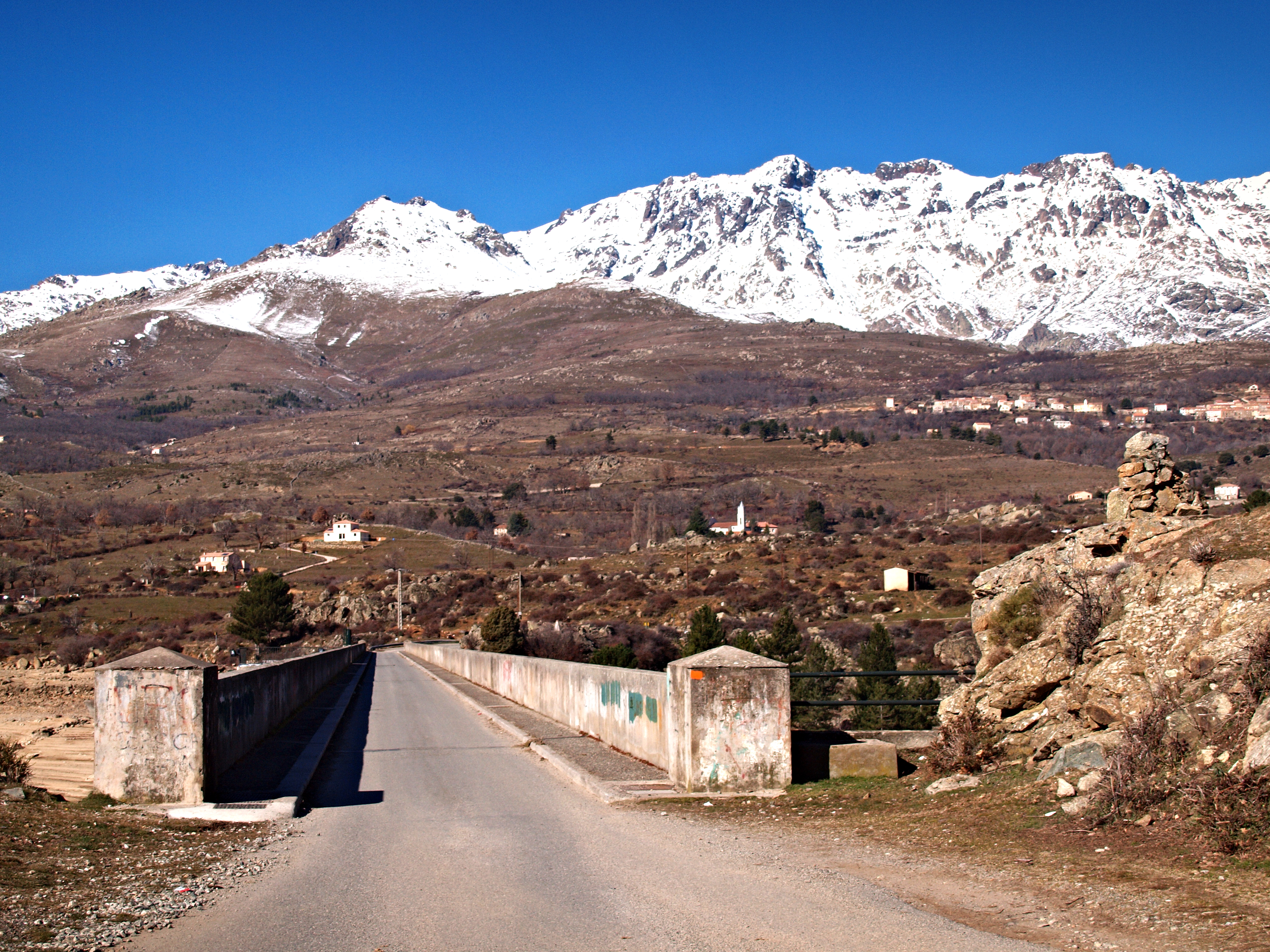
Dam causeway

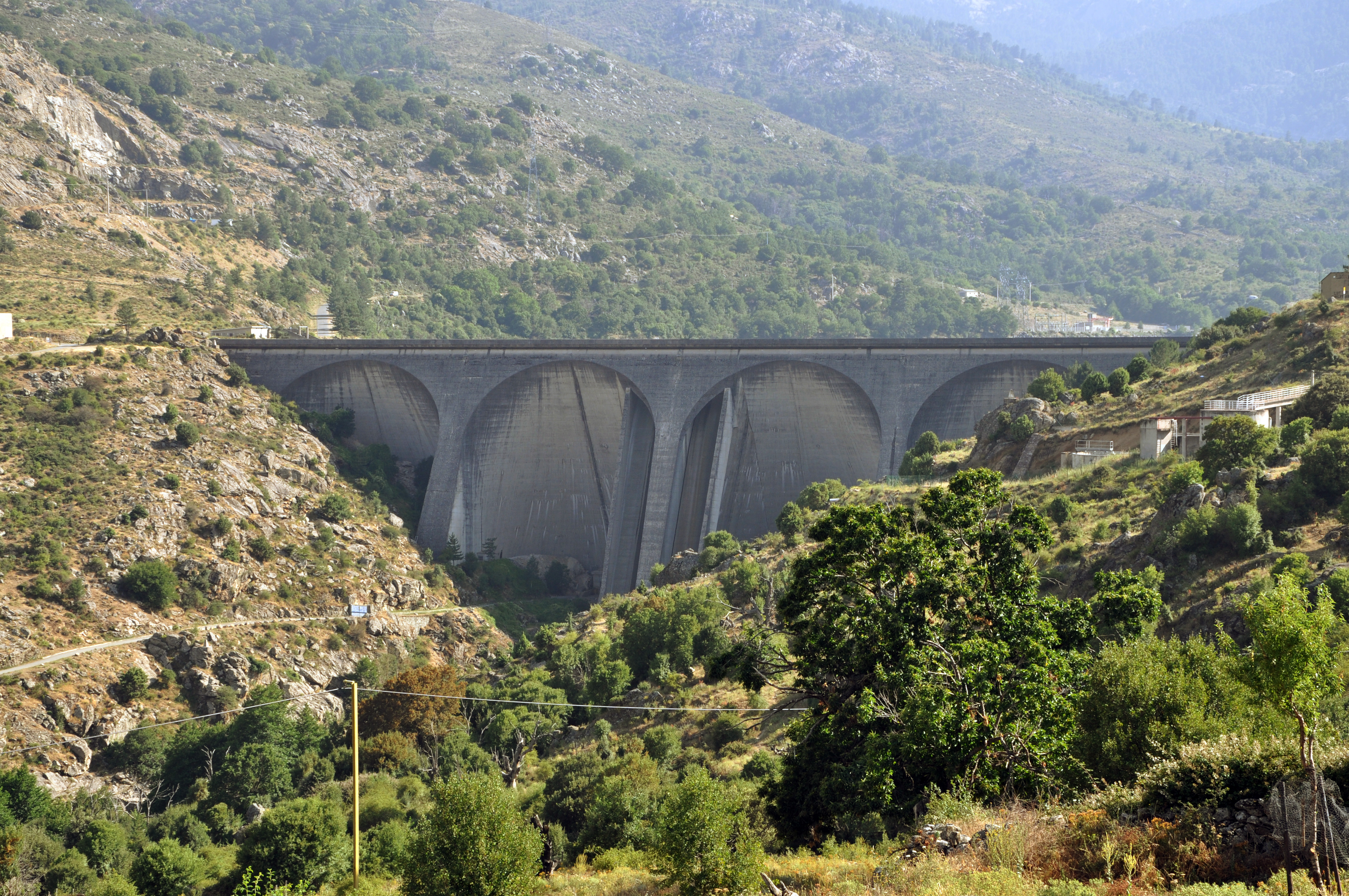
Dam from below

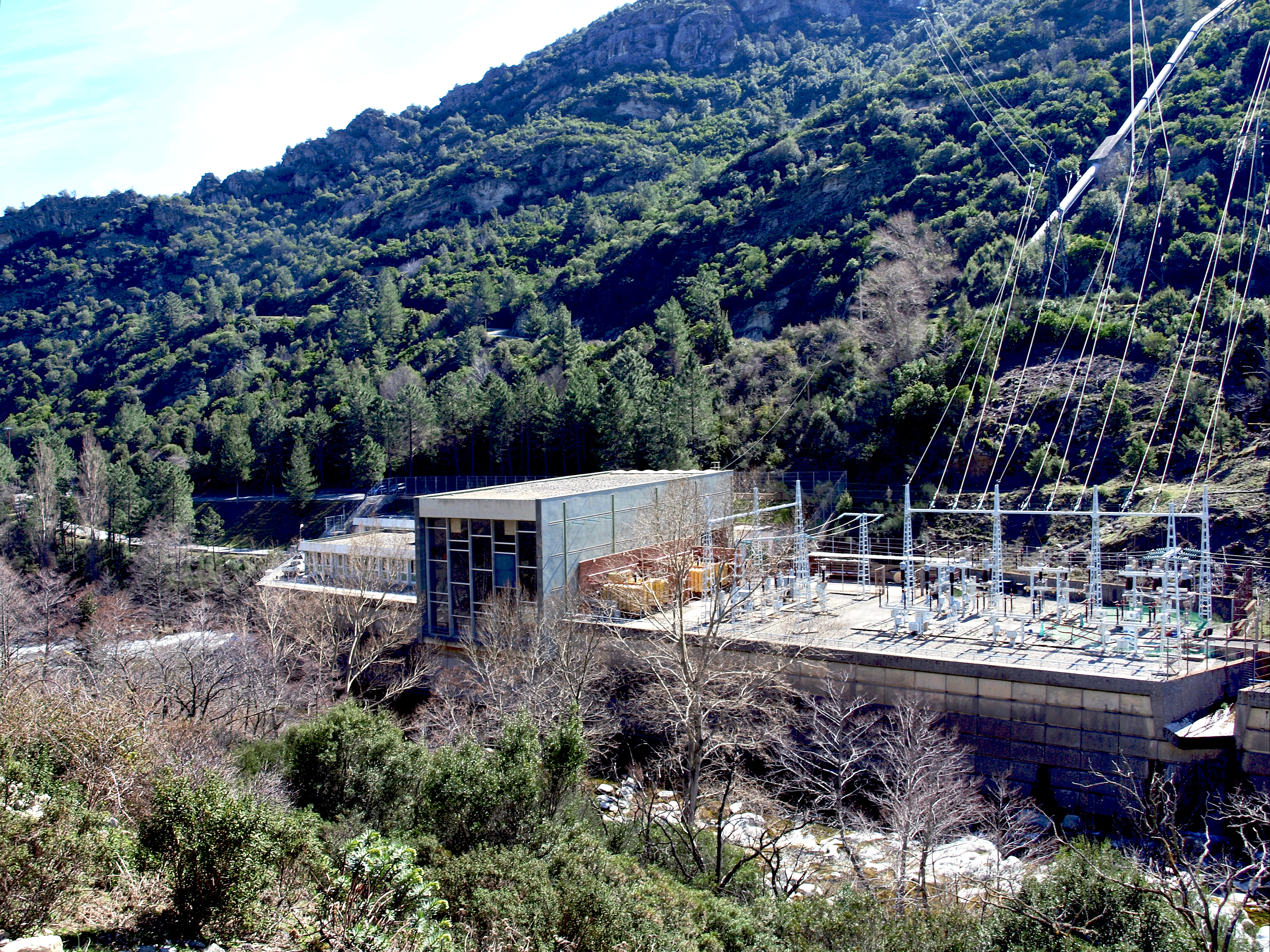
Power station in Castirla

== Sources ==
- "Barrage de Calacuccia", Sandre (in French)
- "Calacuccia et son lac", Location Corse (in French), 4 May 2014
- Corse : Barrage de Calacuccia (in French), CFBR Comité Français des Barrages et Réservoirs
- "Des montagnards manifestent contre la construction du barrage de Calacuccia", Le Monde (in French), 28 August 1964
- FR835COR414 - Lac de barrage de Calacuccia (in French), Initiative PIM, Office de l’Environnement de la Corse (OEC), 2019
- Lac de calacuccia (in French), Agence du tourisme de la Corse
- Le barrage de Calacuccia fête 50 ans de production hydroélectrique (in French), France 3 Corse ViaStella, 29 June 2018
- "Retenue de Calacuccia", Sandre (in French)
- "Way: Lac de Calacuccia (28890020)", OpenStreetMap
