= Barrage de Corscia =

Réservoir de Corscia
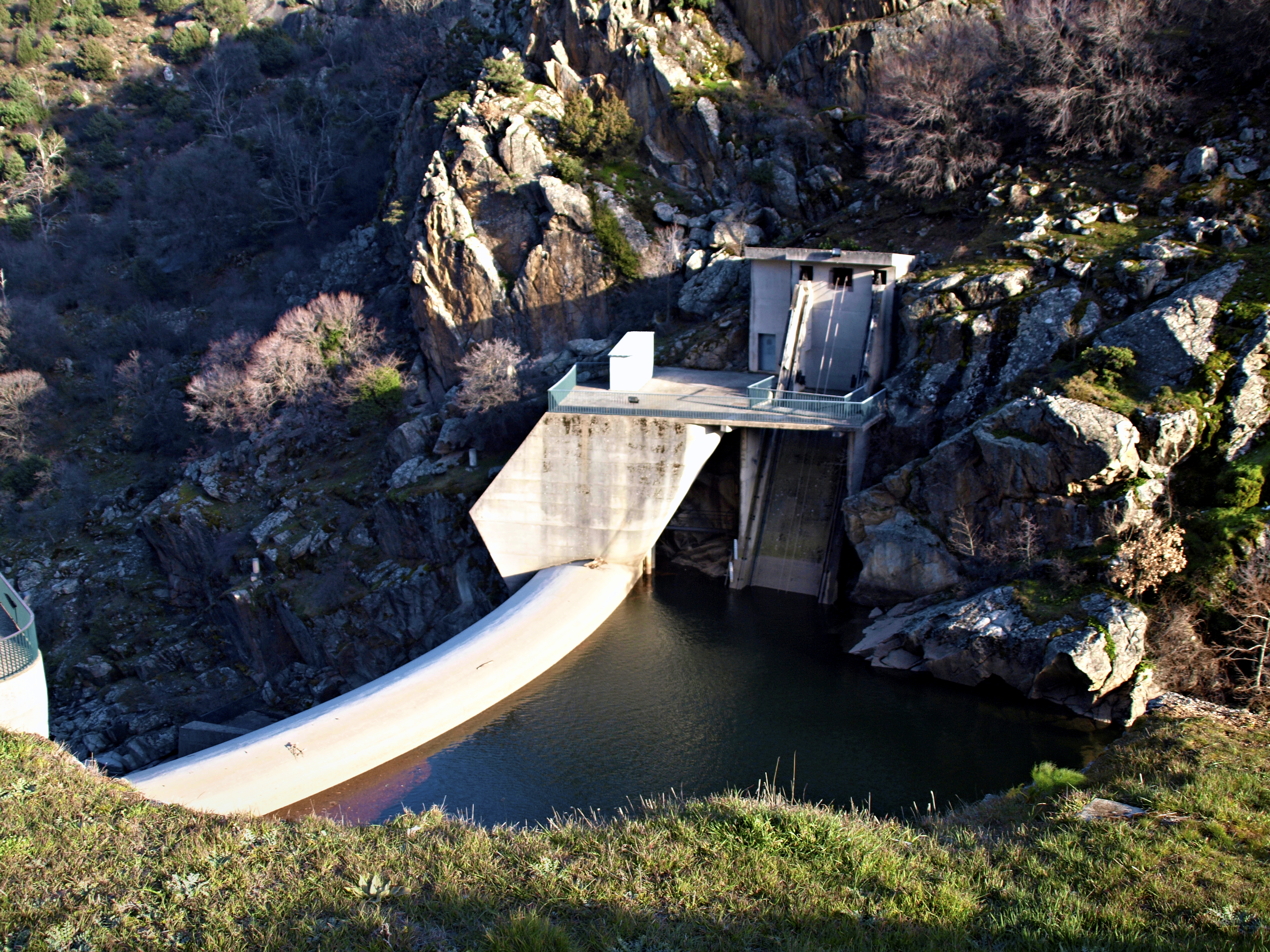
- Dam in March 2010

- Location within Corsica Location within France
- Location: Corsica
- Coordinates: 42.34361°N 9.04722°E
- Type: Reservoir
- Primary inflows: Golo River
- Primary outflows: Golo River
- Catchment area: 162 square kilometres (63 sq mi)
- Basin countries: France
- Surface area: 2.7 ha (6.7 acres)
- Water volume: 200,000 cubic metres (7,100,000 cu ft)
- Surface elevation: 673 m (2,208 ft)

The Barrage de Corscia is a dam in the Haute-Corse department of France on the Golo river. It impounds an intermediate reservoir in the Golo hydroelectric complex. The Corscia hydroelectric power station fed by water channeled from Lac de Calacuccia has a capacity of 13 mW and discharges into the Corscia reservoir. Downstream from the Corscia reservoir there is another power station at Castirla.

== Location ==
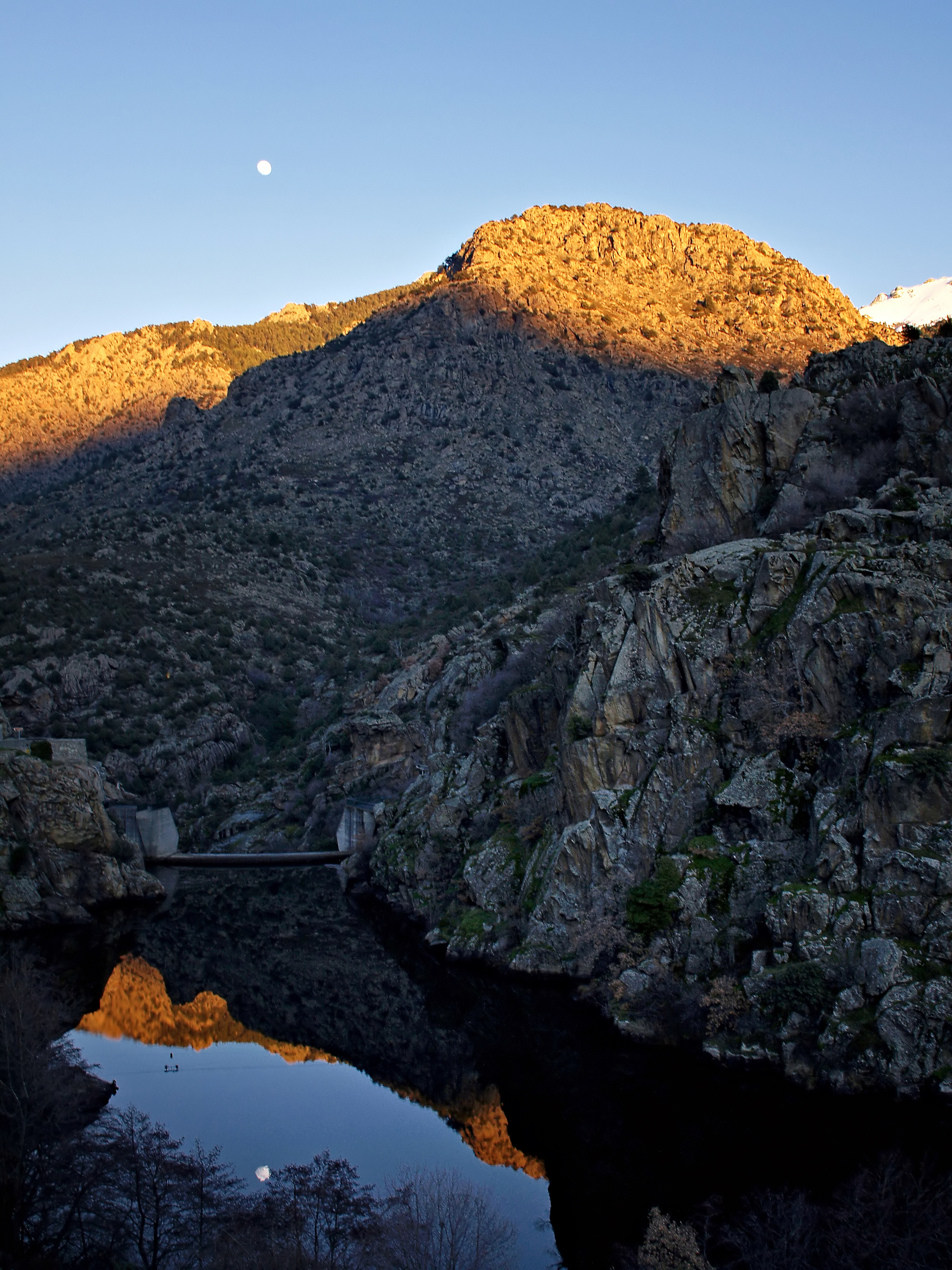
The reservoir

The dam impounds the Golo river in the commune of Corscia to the south of the village of Corscia. It is upstream from the Scala di Santa Regina gorge. The D84 road runs along the north shore of the reservoir, which is elongated in a northeast direction. The reservoir covers 2.7 hectares (6.7 acres) and holds 200,000 cubic metres (7,100,000 cu ft) of water. It has a watershed of 162 square kilometres (63 sq mi).

== Dam ==
The dam is owned and operated by Électricité de France (EDF). It is a concrete arch-gravity dam. Construction began in 1966 and was completed in 1967. It was put into service in 1968. The width at the crest and at the base is 4 metres (13 ft). It is 26 metres (85 ft) high, 50 metres (160 ft) long with a crest elevation of 673 metres (2,208 ft).

== Hydroelectric system ==
The dam is part of the Golo hydroelectric system, which also includes the Lac de Calacuccia and the Sovenzia, Corscia and Castirla hydroelectric plants. The Sega dam on the Tavignano at an altitude of 1,084 metres (3,556 ft) feeds a conduit that carries 6,000 litres per second (210 cu ft/s) of water to the Sovenzia plant, which discharges into the Calacuccia reservoir. This is the main water storage facility, capturing water during snow melt or rainy periods and releasing it during dry periods.

Water is taken from a point just east of the Barrage de Calacuccia and fed through a conduit to the Usine Hydroéléctrique de de Corscia. This hydroelectric power plant is at the south end of the Corscia reservoir. It is about 300 metres (980 ft) upstream from the dam. It has one generator with a capacity of 13 mW. Further downstream there is another plant at Castirla. A power line carries the electricity from the Sovenzia, Corscia and Castirla plants down the river valley, then north and northwest to L'Île-Rousse.

== Sources ==
- "Barrage de Corscia", Structurae (in French)
- "Corscia", Villages de Corse (in French)
- Corse : Barrage de Corscia (in French), CFBR Comité francais des barrages det réservoirs
- "EDF SEI Corse", fête de la nature (in French)
- Grazi, Mario (25 May 2010), "Corte Vers une révision du débit réservé au barrage de la Sega", Corse Matin (in French)
- Le barrage de Rizzanese (in French), EDF
- "Moyens de production electrique en Corse", data.corsica (in French)
- Radut, Daniela (2013), Vivant entre deux mondes (in French), Société des Ecrivains, pp. 304 pages, ISBN 9782342010596
- "Way: Barrage de Corscia (399139781)", OpenStreetMap
