= Cucuruzzu =

Archaeological site in France

Coordinates: 41°43′29″N 9°07′36″E

Cucuruzzu is an archaeological site in Corsica. It is located in the commune of Levie. Cucuruzzu is a ruined fortified village dating from the Bronze Age.

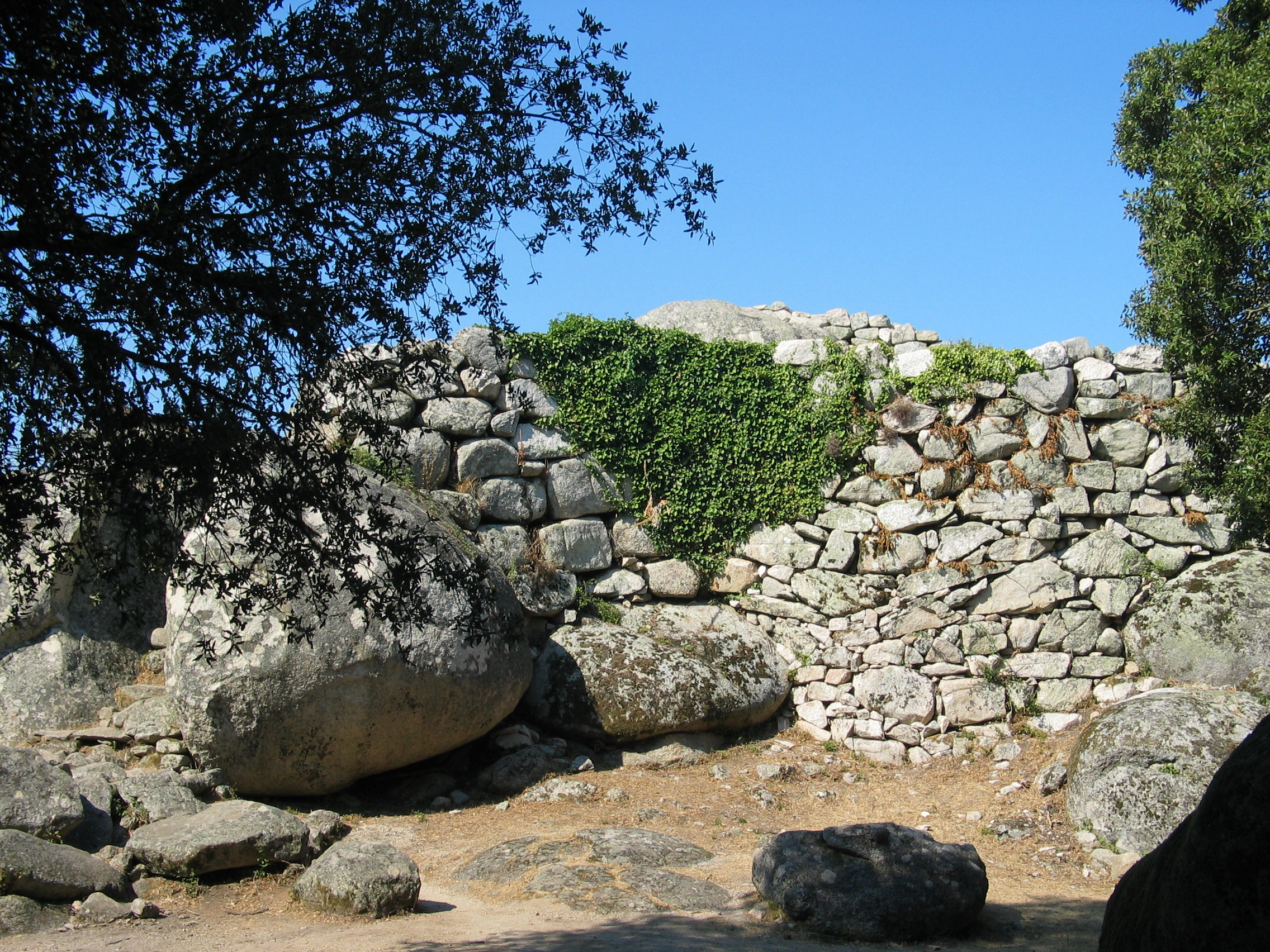
Cucuruzzu

== History of development of the site ==
After the interest in Cucuruzzu in 1959 by Roger Grosjean, archaeologist known for having studied Filitosa, and the excavations which he instigated in 1963 and 1964, the site was acquired in 1975 by the state and declared an historical monument in 1982. It is now owned by the Territorial Collectivity of Corsica.

Restored in 1991, stripping the vegetation which invaded it, its development provides public access while limiting its degradation.
