= Castirla =

- Commune
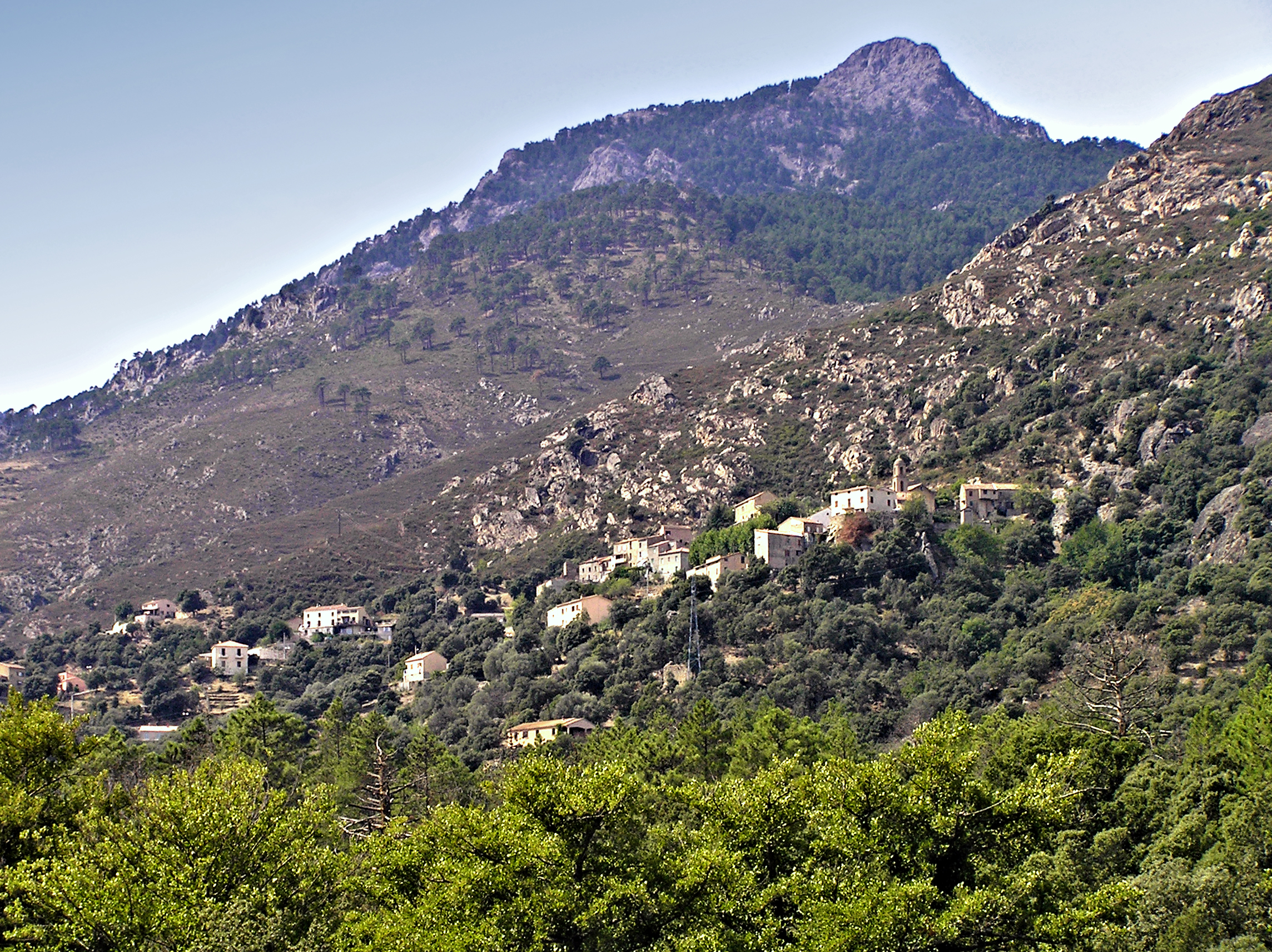
- A general view of Castirla
- Location of Castirla
- Location within France Location within Corsica
- Coordinates: 42°22′24″N 9°08′41″E
- Country: France
- Region: Corsica
- Department: Haute-Corse
- Arrondissement: Corte
- Canton: Golo-Morosaglia

Government
  - Mayor (2020–2026): Jacques-André Tomasini
- Area^{1}: 24.32 km^{2} (9.39 sq mi)
- Elevation: 450 m (1,480 ft)
- Highest elevation: 1,951 m (6,401 ft)
- Lowest elevation: 298 m (978 ft)
- Population (2023): 166
  - Density: 6.83/km^{2} (17.7/sq mi)
- Time zone: UTC+01:00 (CET)
  - Summer (DST): UTC+02:00 (CEST)
- INSEE/Postal code: 2B083 /20236
- ^{1} French Land Register data, which excludes lakes, ponds, glaciers > 1 km^{2} (0.386 sq mi or 247 acres) and river estuaries.

Castirla (French pronunciation: [kastiʁla]) is a commune in the Haute-Corse department of France on the island of Corsica.

== Geography ==
=== Climate ===
Castirla has a hot-summer mediterranean climate (Köppen climate classification Csa). The average annual temperature in Castirla is 14.5 °C (58.1 °F). The average annual rainfall is 705.0 mm (27.76 in) with December as the wettest month. The temperatures are highest on average in July, at around 24.3 °C (75.7 °F), and lowest in January, at around 5.6 °C (42.1 °F). The highest temperature ever recorded in Castirla was 42.8 °C (109.0 °F) on 19 July 2023; the coldest temperature ever recorded was −10.5 °C (13.1 °F) on 10 January 1981.

Climate data for Castirla (1981–2010 normals, extremes 1974−2022)
| Month | Jan | Feb | Mar | Apr | May | Jun | Jul | Aug | Sep | Oct | Nov | Dec | Year |
|---|---|---|---|---|---|---|---|---|---|---|---|---|---|
| Record high °C (°F) | 22.5 (72.5) | 24.0 (75.2) | 32.5 (90.5) | 30.0 (86.0) | 36.0 (96.8) | 39.5 (103.1) | 41.5 (106.7) | 41.0 (105.8) | 36.0 (96.8) | 32.0 (89.6) | 28.5 (83.3) | 21.5 (70.7) | 41.5 (106.7) |
| Mean daily maximum °C (°F) | 11.2 (52.2) | 13.5 (56.3) | 16.9 (62.4) | 19.4 (66.9) | 24.6 (76.3) | 28.9 (84.0) | 33.1 (91.6) | 32.7 (90.9) | 27.7 (81.9) | 22.5 (72.5) | 15.8 (60.4) | 11.2 (52.2) | 21.5 (70.7) |
| Daily mean °C (°F) | 5.6 (42.1) | 7.0 (44.6) | 9.9 (49.8) | 12.4 (54.3) | 17.0 (62.6) | 20.9 (69.6) | 24.3 (75.7) | 24.0 (75.2) | 19.9 (67.8) | 15.7 (60.3) | 10.1 (50.2) | 6.3 (43.3) | 14.5 (58.1) |
| Mean daily minimum °C (°F) | 0.0 (32.0) | 0.5 (32.9) | 2.9 (37.2) | 5.4 (41.7) | 9.4 (48.9) | 12.8 (55.0) | 15.5 (59.9) | 15.3 (59.5) | 12.2 (54.0) | 9.0 (48.2) | 4.4 (39.9) | 1.4 (34.5) | 7.4 (45.3) |
| Record low °C (°F) | −10.5 (13.1) | −7.0 (19.4) | −9.0 (15.8) | −3.5 (25.7) | 0.5 (32.9) | 4.0 (39.2) | 6.5 (43.7) | 6.0 (42.8) | 4.0 (39.2) | 1.0 (33.8) | −5.0 (23.0) | −8.0 (17.6) | −10.5 (13.1) |
| Average precipitation mm (inches) | 61.5 (2.42) | 54.9 (2.16) | 56.7 (2.23) | 74.2 (2.92) | 47.8 (1.88) | 31.7 (1.25) | 20.6 (0.81) | 27.5 (1.08) | 47.0 (1.85) | 87.2 (3.43) | 97.1 (3.82) | 98.8 (3.89) | 705.0 (27.76) |
| Average precipitation days (≥ 1 mm) | 7.0 | 6.6 | 6.9 | 8.3 | 5.8 | 3.8 | 2.2 | 3.1 | 5.0 | 7.4 | 9.0 | 8.9 | 73.9 |
Source: Météo-France

== Population ==
Historical population
| Year | Pop. | ±% p.a. |
|---|---|---|
| 1968 | 185 | — |
| 1975 | 206 | +1.55% |
| 1982 | 184 | −1.60% |
| 1990 | 145 | −2.93% |
| 1999 | 186 | +2.81% |
| 2007 | 176 | −0.69% |
| 2012 | 176 | +0.00% |
| 2017 | 168 | −0.93% |
| 2023 | 166 | −0.20% |
Source: INSEE

== See also ==
- Communes of the Haute-Corse department
