= Zoza =

Commune in Corsica, France

- Commune
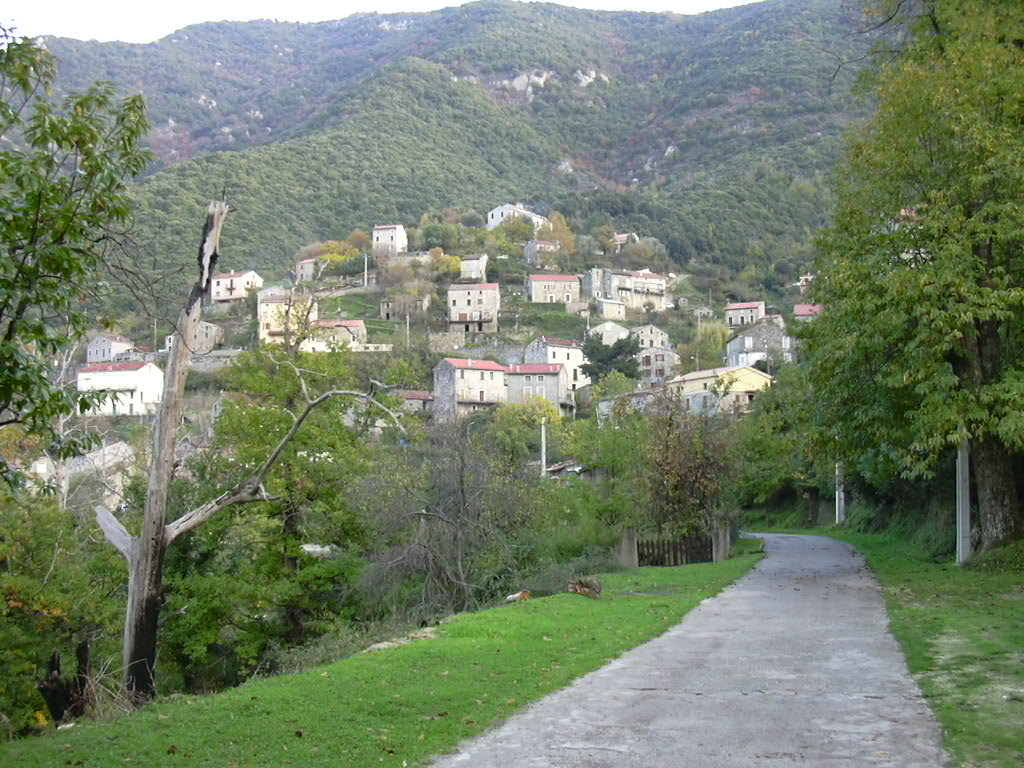
- A general view of the village of Zoza
- Location of Zoza
- Location within France Location within Corsica
- Coordinates: 41°43′07″N 9°04′14″E
- Country: France
- Region: Corsica
- Department: Corse-du-Sud
- Arrondissement: Sartène
- Canton: Sartenais-Valinco
- Intercommunality: Alta Rocca

Government
  - Mayor (2020–2026): Pierre Marcellesi
- Area^{1}: 5.05 km^{2} (1.95 sq mi)
- Elevation: 450 m (1,480 ft)
- Highest elevation: 826 m (2,710 ft)
- Lowest elevation: 158 m (518 ft)
- Population (2023): 66
  - Density: 13/km^{2} (34/sq mi)
- Demonym(s): Zozais, Zozaises
- Time zone: UTC+01:00 (CET)
  - Summer (DST): UTC+02:00 (CEST)
- INSEE/Postal code: 2A363 /20112
- ^{1} French Land Register data, which excludes lakes, ponds, glaciers > 1 km^{2} (0.386 sq mi or 247 acres) and river estuaries.

Zoza is a commune in the Corse-du-Sud department of France on the island of Corsica.

== Geography ==
The river Rizzanese runs through the village which is located 88 km from Ajaccio.

== Population ==
Historical population

Year	Pop.	±% p.a.
1800	194	—
1806	178	−1.42%
1821	192	+0.51%
1831	201	+0.46%
1836	211	+0.98%
1841	208	−0.29%
1846	227	+1.76%
1851	217	−0.90%
1856	202	−1.42%
1861	240	+3.51%
1866	260	+1.61%
1872	240	−1.33%
1876	260	+2.02%
1881	274	+1.05%
1886	269	−0.37%
1891	269	+0.00%
1896	286	+1.23%
1901	211	−5.90%

Year	Pop.	±% p.a.
1906	210	−0.09%
1911	209	−0.10%
1921	197	−0.59%
1926	231	+3.24%
1931	233	+0.17%
1936	240	+0.59%
1946	230	−0.42%
1954	200	−1.73%
1962	117	−6.48%
1968	84	−5.37%
1975	80	−0.69%
1982	67	−2.50%
1990	55	−2.44%
1999	51	−0.84%
2007	63	+2.68%
2012	51	−4.14%
2017	54	+1.15%
2023	66	+3.40%

Source: EHESS and INSEE

== See also ==
- Communes of the Corse-du-Sud department
