= Serra-di-Scopamène =

Commune in Corsica, France

Serra-di-Scopamène A Sarra di Scupamè
- Commune
- Location of Serra-di-Scopamène
- Location within France Location within Corsica
- Coordinates: 41°45′16″N 9°05′59″E
- Country: France
- Region: Corsica
- Department: Corse-du-Sud
- Arrondissement: Sartène
- Canton: Sartenais-Valinco
- Intercommunality: l'Alta Rocca

Government
  - Mayor (2020–2026): Jean-Paul Rocca Serra
- Area^{1}: 20.42 km^{2} (7.88 sq mi)
- Elevation: 865 m (2,838 ft)
- Highest elevation: 1,627 m (5,338 ft)
- Lowest elevation: 320 m (1,050 ft)
- Population (2023): 135
  - Density: 6.61/km^{2} (17.1/sq mi)
- Time zone: UTC+01:00 (CET)
  - Summer (DST): UTC+02:00 (CEST)
- INSEE/Postal code: 2A278 /20127
- ^{1} French Land Register data, which excludes lakes, ponds, glaciers > 1 km^{2} (0.386 sq mi or 247 acres) and river estuaries.

Serra-di-Scopamène is a commune in the Corse-du-Sud department of France on the island of Corsica. It takes its name from the Scopamène river, which flows through the commune.

== Population ==
Historical population
Year	Pop.	±% p.a.
1968	299	—
1975	283	−0.78%
1982	237	−2.50%
1990	154	−5.25%
1999	120	−2.73%
2007	108	−1.31%
2012	104	−0.75%
2017	89	−3.07%
2023	135	+7.19%
Source: INSEE

== See also ==
- Communes of the Corse-du-Sud department
