= Carbini =

Commune in Corsica, France

- Commune
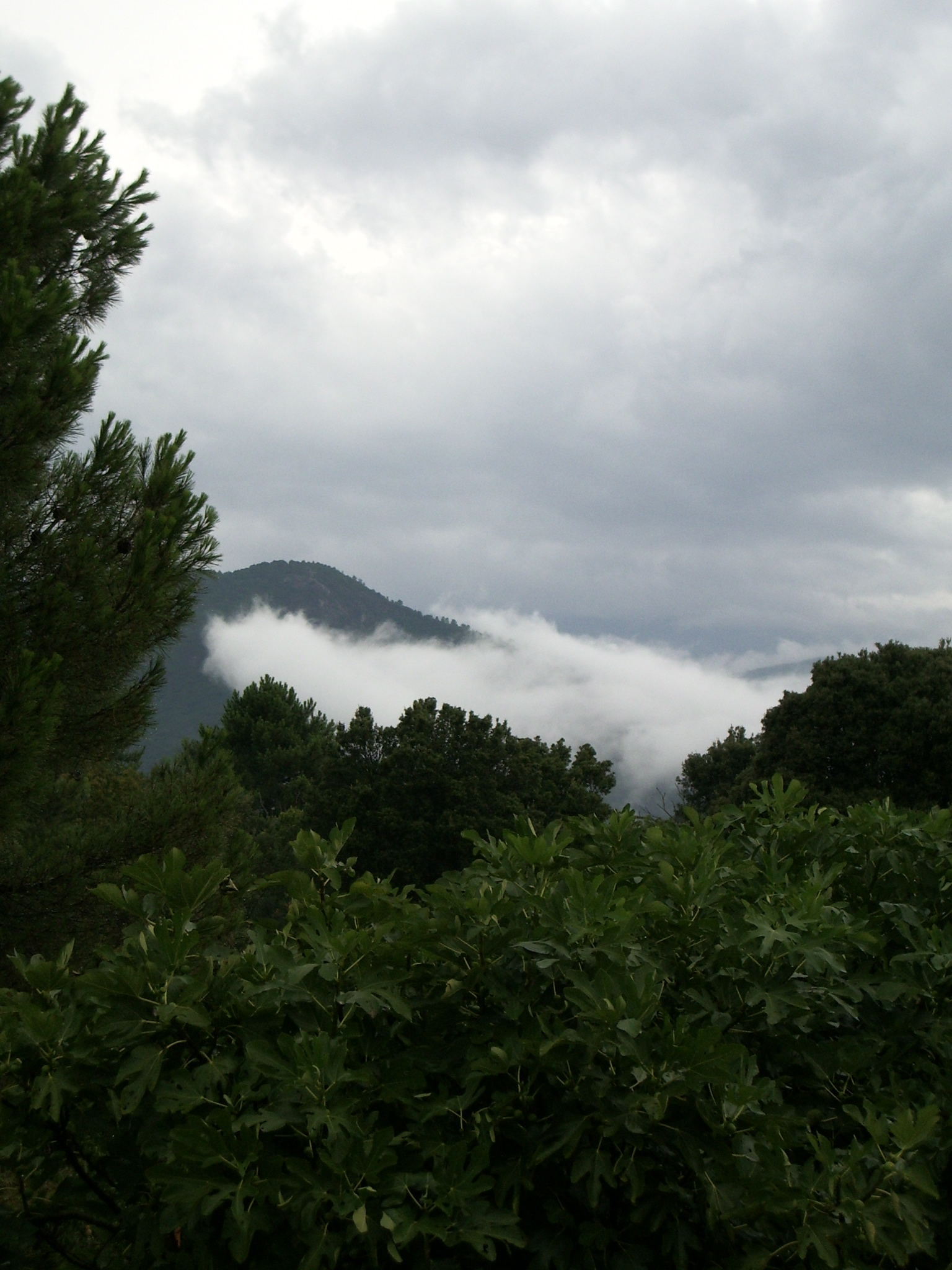
- A view between Carbini and Orone
- Location of Carbini
- Location within France Location within Corsica
- Coordinates: 41°40′47″N 9°08′50″E
- Country: France
- Region: Corsica
- Department: Corse-du-Sud
- Arrondissement: Sartène
- Canton: Grand Sud
- Intercommunality: Alta Rocca

Government
  - Mayor (2020–2026): Jean Jacques Nicolaï
- Area^{1}: 16.47 km^{2} (6.36 sq mi)
- Elevation: 600 m (2,000 ft)
- Highest elevation: 1,316 m (4,318 ft)
- Lowest elevation: 257 m (843 ft)
- Population (2023): 117
  - Density: 7.10/km^{2} (18.4/sq mi)
- Time zone: UTC+01:00 (CET)
  - Summer (DST): UTC+02:00 (CEST)
- INSEE/Postal code: 2A061 /20170
- ^{1} French Land Register data, which excludes lakes, ponds, glaciers > 1 km^{2} (0.386 sq mi or 247 acres) and river estuaries.

Carbini (French pronunciation: [kaʁbini]; Corsican: Càrbini) is a commune in the Corse-du-Sud department of France on the island of Corsica.

== Population ==
Historical population
Year	Pop.	±% p.a.
1968	148	—
1975	128	−2.05%
1982	125	−0.34%
1990	95	−3.37%
1999	100	+0.57%
2007	102	+0.25%
2012	108	+1.15%
2017	103	−0.94%
2023	117	+2.15%
Source: INSEE

== See also ==
- Communes of the Corse-du-Sud department
