= Sorbollano =

Commune in Corsica, France

- Commune
- Location of Sorbollano
- Location within France Location within Corsica
- Coordinates: 41°45′10″N 9°06′35″E
- Country: France
- Region: Corsica
- Department: Corse-du-Sud
- Arrondissement: Sartène
- Canton: Sartenais-Valinco
- Intercommunality: l'Alta Rocca

Government
  - Mayor (2020–2026): Alain Martinelli
- Area^{1}: 7.7 km^{2} (3.0 sq mi)
- Elevation: 700 m (2,300 ft)
- Highest elevation: 1,160 m (3,810 ft)
- Lowest elevation: 358 m (1,175 ft)
- Population (2023): 65
  - Density: 8.4/km^{2} (22/sq mi)
- Time zone: UTC+01:00 (CET)
  - Summer (DST): UTC+02:00 (CEST)
- INSEE/Postal code: 2A285 /20152
- ^{1} French Land Register data, which excludes lakes, ponds, glaciers > 1 km^{2} (0.386 sq mi or 247 acres) and river estuaries.

Sorbollano (French pronunciation: [sɔʁbɔlano]; Corsican: Surbuddà) is a commune in the Corse-du-Sud department of France on the island of Corsica.

== Population ==
Historical population
Year	Pop.	±% p.a.
1968	114	—
1975	110	−0.51%
1982	63	−7.65%
1990	73	+1.86%
1999	69	−0.62%
2007	80	+1.87%
2012	64	−4.36%
2017	78	+4.04%
2023	65	−2.99%
Source: INSEE

== See also ==
- Communes of the Corse-du-Sud department
