= Cargiaca =

Commune in Corsica, France

Cargiaca Carghjaca
- Commune
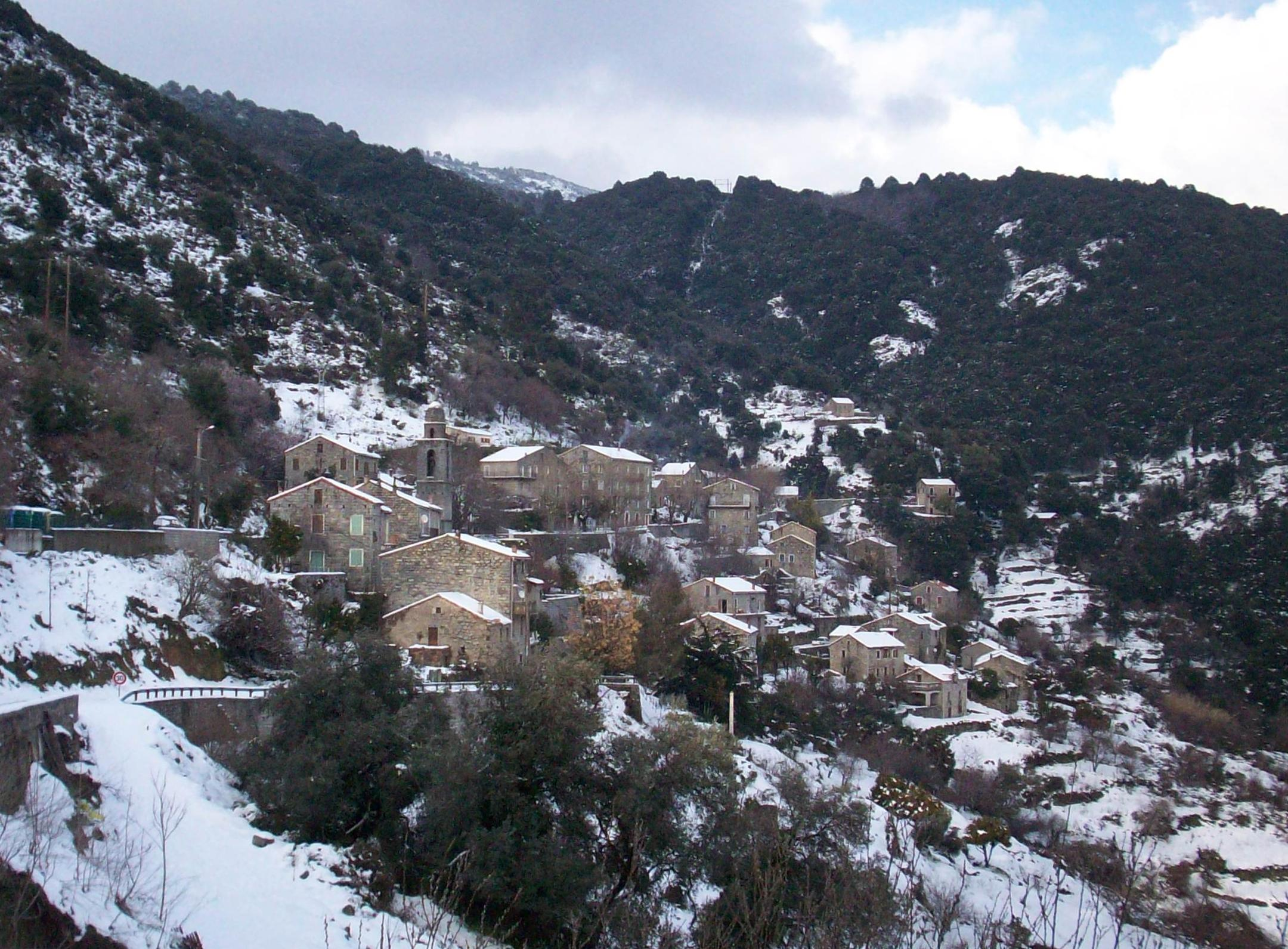
- The village of Cargiaca, in the snow
- Location of Cargiaca
- Location within France Location within Corsica
- Coordinates: 41°43′54″N 9°02′51″E
- Country: France
- Region: Corsica
- Department: Corse-du-Sud
- Arrondissement: Sartène
- Canton: Sartenais-Valinco

Government
  - Mayor (2020–2026): Don Jacques de Rocca Serra
- Area^{1}: 7.87 km^{2} (3.04 sq mi)
- Elevation: 454 m (1,490 ft)
- Highest elevation: 1,005 m (3,297 ft)
- Lowest elevation: 148 m (486 ft)
- Population (2023): 64
  - Density: 8.1/km^{2} (21/sq mi)
- Time zone: UTC+01:00 (CET)
  - Summer (DST): UTC+02:00 (CEST)
- INSEE/Postal code: 2A066 /20164
- ^{1} French Land Register data, which excludes lakes, ponds, glaciers > 1 km^{2} (0.386 sq mi or 247 acres) and river estuaries.

Cargiaca is a commune in the Corse-du-Sud department of France on the island of Corsica.

== Geography ==
Cargiaca is just to the east of Mont Peloso (974 metres (3,196 ft)).

== Population ==
Historical population
| Year | Pop. | ±% p.a. |
|---|---|---|
| 1968 | 122 | — |
| 1975 | 100 | −2.80% |
| 1982 | 90 | −1.49% |
| 1990 | 69 | −3.27% |
| 1999 | 49 | −3.73% |
| 2007 | 58 | +2.13% |
| 2012 | 55 | −1.06% |
| 2017 | 55 | +0.00% |
| 2023 | 64 | +2.56% |
Source: INSEE

== See also ==
- Communes of the Corse-du-Sud department
