= Levie =

Commune in Corsica, France

- Commune
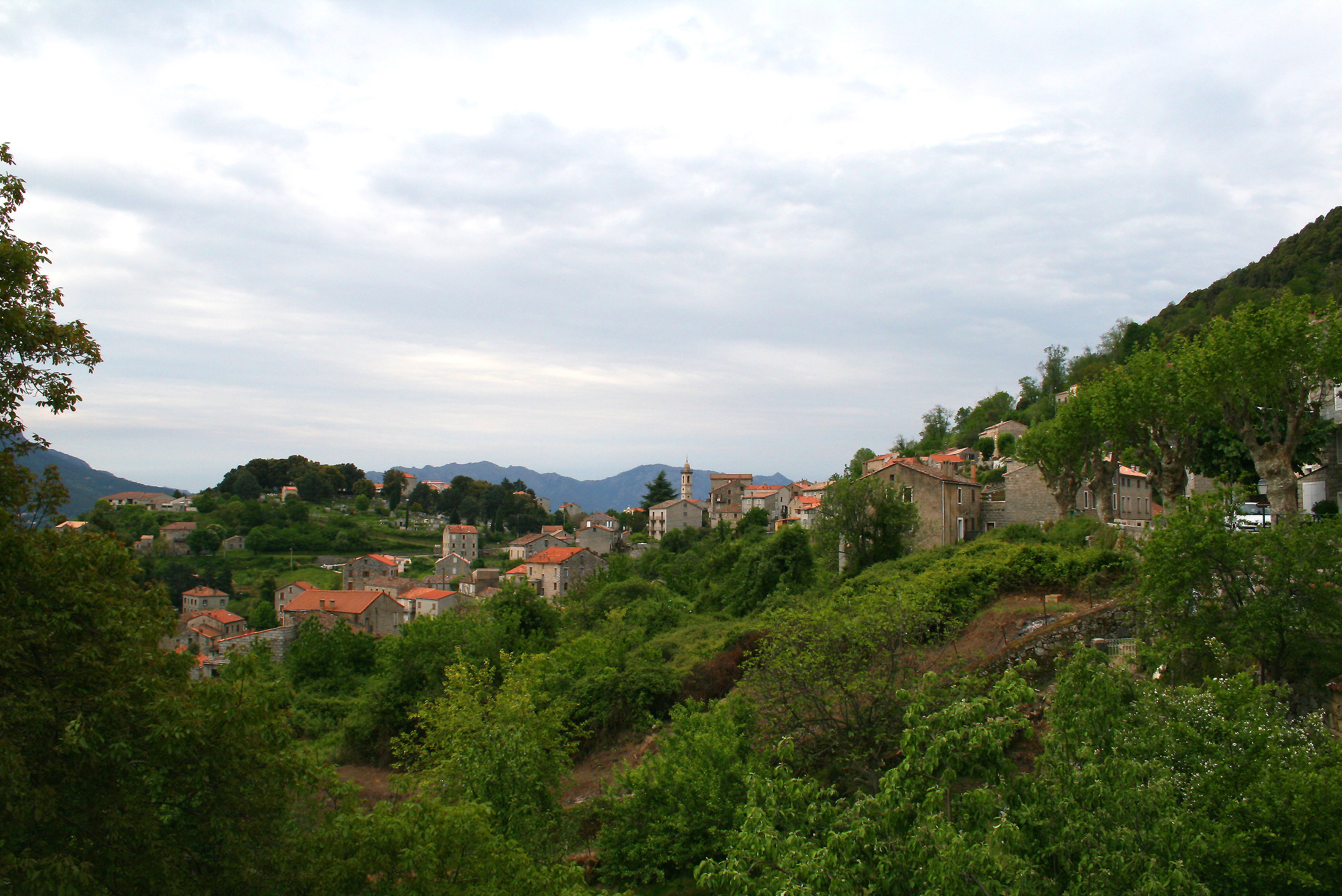
- A view of the old village of Levie
- Location of Levie
- Location within France Location within Corsica
- Coordinates: 41°42′17″N 9°07′25″E
- Country: France
- Region: Corsica
- Department: Corse-du-Sud
- Arrondissement: Sartène
- Canton: Grand Sud

Government
  - Mayor (2020–2026): Alexandre De Lanfranchi
- Area^{1}: 85.85 km^{2} (33.15 sq mi)
- Elevation: 656 m (2,152 ft)
- Highest elevation: 1,366 m (4,482 ft)
- Lowest elevation: 152 m (499 ft)
- Population (2023): 674
  - Density: 7.85/km^{2} (20.3/sq mi)
- Time zone: UTC+01:00 (CET)
  - Summer (DST): UTC+02:00 (CEST)
- INSEE/Postal code: 2A142 /20170
- ^{1} French Land Register data, which excludes lakes, ponds, glaciers > 1 km^{2} (0.386 sq mi or 247 acres) and river estuaries.

Levie (French pronunciation: [levi]; Corsican: Livìa) is a commune in the French department of Corse-du-Sud, collectivity of Corsica, France. The ruined Bronze Age fortified village Cucuruzzu is situated in the commune.

== Population ==
Historical population
Year	Pop.	±% p.a.
1968	1,002	—
1975	912	−1.34%
1982	752	−2.72%
1990	781	+0.47%
1999	696	−1.27%
2007	750	+0.94%
2012	737	−0.35%
2017	687	−1.40%
2023	674	−0.32%
Source: INSEE

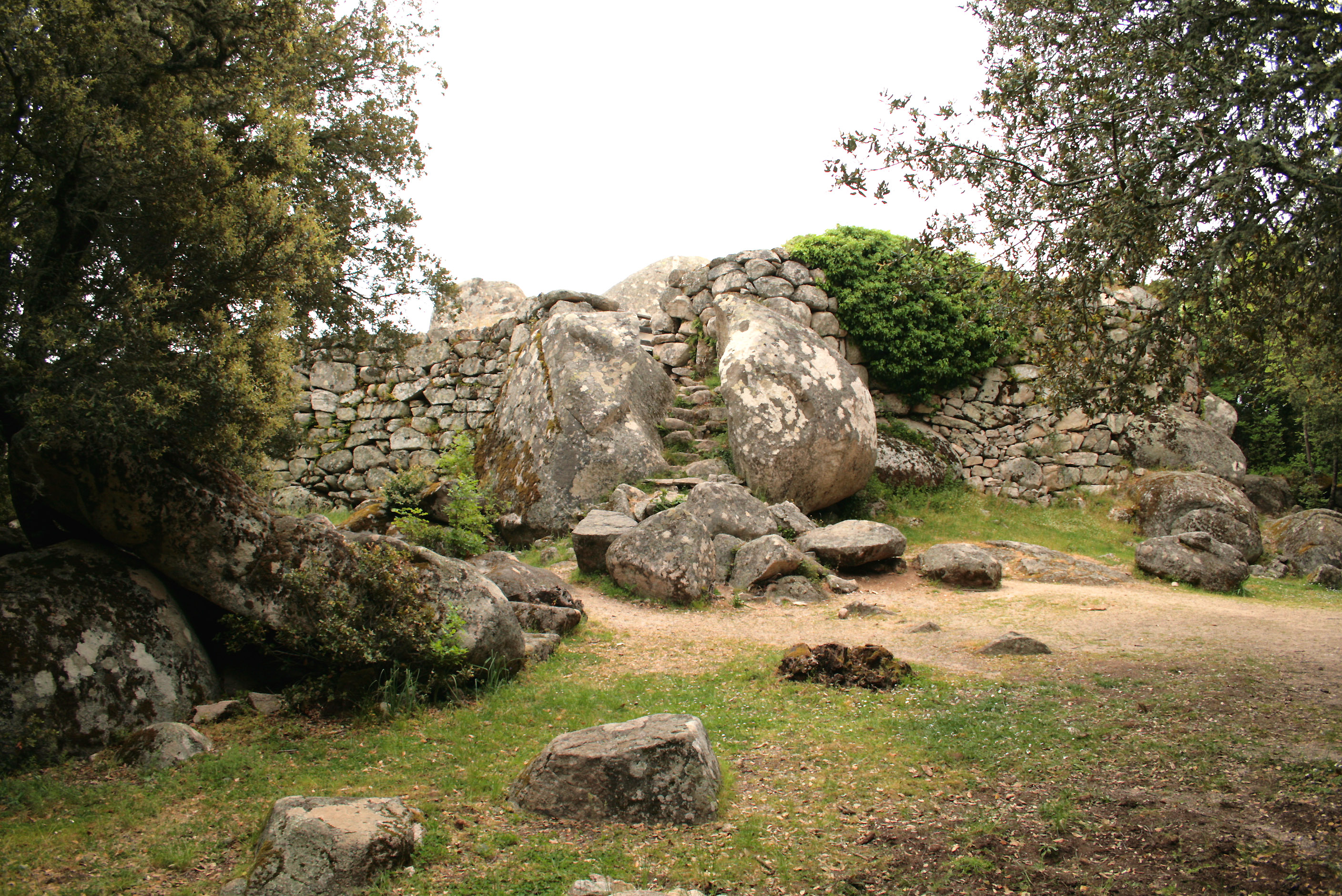
Entry stairs and cyclopean walls of the prehistoric fortress of Cucuruzzu.

== See also ==
- Communes of the Corse-du-Sud department
