= List of French historic monuments protected in 1840 =

The List of historic monuments protected in 1840 is a list of the historic monuments of France created in 1840 by the French Commission for Historical Monuments (Commission des monuments historiques). It was the first protection of this type in the country.

In 1837, following the request of Prosper Mérimée, then inspector general of historical monuments, the prefects received a circular asking them to draw up a list of the monuments in their department whose restoration they considered to be a priority, by classifying them in order of importance. The Commission for Historical Monuments was then responsible for classifying all the lists: in 1840, this request resulted in a list of a thousand monuments "for which relief has been requested" and therefore require work (and therefore funds), to be preserved. This was the first list of its kind in France.

The monuments concerned are for the most part public (belonging to the State, the municipality, or the department). The list contains both buildings (churches, castles, etc.) and objects (stained-glass windows, etc.). In total, it has 1,082 entries, including 934 buildings.

== List of monuments ==
Liste des monuments historiques de 1840
Département	Monument	Commune	Construction period	Type	Base Mérimée	Photo
Ain	Petit séminaire de Belley	Belley	-	seminary	Mérimée	
Ain	Temple Romain d'Izernore	Izernore	Antiquity	Roman temple	Mérimée	
Ain	Église Saint-André	Saint-André-de-Bâgé	12th century	church	Mérimée	
Ain	Roman aqueduct of Vieu	Vieu	Antiquity	aqueduct	Mérimée	
Aisne	Église abbatiale Saint-Yved de Braine	Braine, Aisne	12th century, 13th and 15th centuries	abbey	Mérimée	
Aisne	Cathédrale Notre-Dame de Laon	Laon	12th – 13th century	cathedral	Mérimée	
Aisne	Basilique de Saint-Quentin	Saint-Quentin	13th to 15th century	collegiate church	Mérimée	
Aisne	Oppidum et vestiges romains du Bas-Empire	Vermand	Antiquity	Gallo-Roman city	Mérimée	
Allier	Église Notre-Dame de Châtel-Montagne	Châtel-Montagne	11th century	church	Mérimée	
Allier	Pavillon d'Anne de Beaujeu	Moulins	16th century	pavilion	Mérimée	
Allier	Église romane de Saint-Menoux	Saint-Menoux	11th – 12th century	church	Mérimée	
Allier	Église Saint-Marc de Souvigny et Prieuré clunisien de Souvigny (église abbatiale)	Souvigny	12th century	abbey	Mérimée	
Alpes-de-Haute-Provence	Cathédrale Notre-Dame-du-Bourg de Digne	Digne-les-Bains	11th century, 13th to 15th century	cathedral	Mérimée	
Alpes-de-Haute-Provence	Château de Gréoux-les-Bains	Gréoux-les-Bains	13th to 16th century	castle	Mérimée	
Alpes-de-Haute-Provence	Baptistère de Riez	Riez	4th – 5th century, 11th and 17th centuries	Baptistery	Mérimée	
Alpes-de-Haute-Provence	Colonnade antique de Riez	Riez	1st century	colonnade	Mérimée	
Alpes-de-Haute-Provence	Cathédrale Notre-Dame-des-Pommiers de Sisteron	Sisteron	10th – 11th century	cathedral	Mérimée	
Hautes-Alpes	Cathédrale Notre-Dame d'Embrun	Embrun	12th – 13th century	cathedral	Mérimée	
Alpes-Maritimes	Monastère fortifié de l'abbaye de Lérins	Cannes, sur l'île Saint-Honorat	Medieval	château fort	Mérimée	
Ardennes	Abbatiale de Mouzon	Mouzon	12th to 15th century	abbey	Mérimée	
Ariège	Château de Foix	Foix	12th century	château fort	Mérimée	
Aube	Église Saint-Étienne d'Arcis-sur-Aube	Arcis-sur-Aube	16th century	church	Mérimée	
Aube	Église Saint-Maclou de Bar-sur-Aube	Bar-sur-Aube	12th to 14th century, 18th century	church	Mérimée	
Aube	Église Saint-Pierre de Bar-sur-Aube	Bar-sur-Aube	16th century	church	Mérimée	
Aube	Église de la Nativité-de-la-Vierge de Bérulle	Bérulle	16th century	church	Mérimée	
Aube	Église Saint-Jean-Baptiste de Chaource	Chaource	16th century	church	Mérimée	
Aube	Église Saint-Loup de Chappes	Chappes	12th and 16th centuries	church	Mérimée	
Aube	Église de la Nativité-de-la-Sainte-Vierge de Fouchères	Fouchères	12th century	church	Mérimée	
Aube	Église Notre-Dame-de-l'Assomption de Montiéramey	Montiéramey	12th and 16th centuries	church	Mérimée	
Aube	Église Saint-Pierre-ès-Liens de Mussy-sur-Seine	Mussy-sur-Seine	13th – 14th century	church	Mérimée	
Aube	Église Saint-Pierre-ès-Liens de Riceys-Bas	Les Riceys	15th – 16th century	church	Mérimée	
Aube	Église Saint-Martin de Rumilly-lès-Vaudes	Rumilly-lès-Vaudes	16th century	church	Mérimée	
Aube	Église Saint-André de Saint-André-les-Vergers	Saint-André-les-Vergers	16th century	church	Mérimée	
Aube	Église Saint-Jean de Troyes	Troyes	16th century	church	Mérimée	
Aube	Église Saint-Nizier de Troyes	Troyes	16th century	church	Mérimée	
Aube	Basilique Saint-Urbain de Troyes	Troyes	13th century	church	Mérimée	
Aube	Église Sainte-Madeleine de Troyes	Troyes	16th – 17th century	church	Mérimée	
Aube	Église Saint-Pierre-et-Saint-Paul de Villenauxe-la-Grande	Villenauxe-la-Grande	13th century	church	Mérimée	
Aude	Basilique Saint-Nazaire de Carcassonne	Carcassonne	11th – 14th century	abandoned cathedral	Mérimée	
Aude	Palais des archevêques de Narbonne	Narbonne	12th – 14th century, 17th – 18th century	Archbishop's palace	Mérimée	
Aude	Cathédrale Saint-Just-et-Saint-Pasteur de Narbonne	Narbonne	13th – 14th century, 18th century	cathedral	Mérimée	
Aude	Église de l'Assomption de Rieux-Minervois	Rieux-Minervois	12th century	church	Mérimée	
Aude	Abbaye de Saint-Hilaire	Saint-Hilaire	13th to 15th century	abbey	Mérimée	
Aveyron	Abbatiale Sainte-Foy de Conques	Conques	11th century	abbey	Mérimée	
Aveyron	Chartreuse Saint-Sauveur de Villefranche-de-Rouergue	Villefranche-de-Rouergue	15th century	abbey	Mérimée	
Bouches-du-Rhône	Cathédrale Saint-Sauveur d'Aix-en-Provence	Aix-en-Provence	13th to 16th century	cathedral	Mérimée	
Bouches-du-Rhône	Église Saint-Jean-de-Malte d'Aix-en-Provence	Aix-en-Provence	14th – 17th century	church	Mérimée	
Bouches-du-Rhône	Abbaye de Montmajour	Arles	Medieval	abbey	Mérimée	
Bouches-du-Rhône	Arènes d'Arles	Arles	1st century	Roman amphitheatre	Mérimée Mérimée	
Bouches-du-Rhône	Chapelle Saint-Jean-de-Moustiers d'Arles anciennement église basse de Saint-Césaire	Arles	11th century	chapel	Mérimée	
Bouches-du-Rhône	Colonnes de Saint-Lucien sur le Forum d'Arles	Arles	2nd century	colonnade	Mérimée	
Bouches-du-Rhône	Church of St. Trophime, Arles	Arles	12th – 15th century	abandoned cathedral	Mérimée	
Bouches-du-Rhône	Église Saint-Honorat des Alyscamps	Arles	4th century	church	Mérimée	
Bouches-du-Rhône	Obélisque d'Arles	Arles	1st century	obelisk	Mérimée	
Bouches-du-Rhône	Thermes de Constantin	Arles	4th century	thermae	Mérimée	
Bouches-du-Rhône	Théâtre antique d'Arles	Arles	1st century BCE	Roman theatre	Mérimée	
Bouches-du-Rhône	Abbaye Saint-Victor de Marseille	Marseille	5th – 16th century	abbey	Mérimée	
Bouches-du-Rhône	Caves Saint-Sauveur	Marseille	gallo-romain		Mérimée	
Bouches-du-Rhône	Église de la vieille Major	Marseille	12th century	church	Mérimée	
Bouches-du-Rhône	Abbaye de Silvacane	La Roque-d'Anthéron	13th century	abbey	Mérimée	
Bouches-du-Rhône	Pont Flavien	Saint-Chamas	1st century BCE	bridge	Mérimée	
Bouches-du-Rhône	Arc de triomphe de Glanum	Saint-Rémy-de-Provence	1st century BCE	arc de triomphe	Mérimée	
Bouches-du-Rhône	Mausolée de Glanum	Saint-Rémy-de-Provence	1st century BCE	mausoleum	Mérimée	
Bouches-du-Rhône	Église de Notre-Dame-de-la-Mer	Saintes-Maries-de-la-Mer	11th – 12th century	church	Mérimée	
Bouches-du-Rhône	Église Saint-Laurent de Salon-de-Provence	Salon-de-Provence	15th century	church	Mérimée	
Bouches-du-Rhône	Chapelle Saint-Gabriel de Tarascon	Tarascon	13th century	chapel	Mérimée	
Bouches-du-Rhône	Château du roi René	Tarascon	15th century	château fort	Mérimée	
Bouches-du-Rhône	Église Sainte-Marthe de Tarascon	Tarascon	12th – 14th century	church	Mérimée	
Bouches-du-Rhône	Temple romain de Château-Bas	Vernègues	Antiquity	Roman temple (vestiges)	Mérimée	
Calvados	Église Saint-Vigor d'Asnières-en-Bessin	Asnières-en-Bessin	13th century	church	Mérimée	
Calvados	Église Notre-Dame-de-la-Nativité de Bernières-sur-Mer	Bernières-sur-Mer	12th – 14th century	church	Mérimée	
Calvados	Abbaye aux Dames	Caen	11th – 12th century	abbey	Mérimée	
Calvados	Église Saint-Étienne (ancienne abbatiale de l'abbaye aux Hommes)	Caen	11th – 12th century	abbey	Mérimée	
Calvados	Église Saint-Jean de Caen	Caen	13th – 16th century	church	Mérimée	
Calvados	Church of Saint-Pierre	Caen	14th – 16th century	church	Mérimée	
Calvados	Église Notre-Dame-de-l'Assomption de Colleville-sur-Mer	Colleville-sur-Mer	12th – 13th century	church	Mérimée	
Calvados	Église Saint-Romain d'Étréham	Étréham	11th – 12th century	church	Mérimée	
Calvados	Château de Falaise	Falaise	12th – 13th century	château fort	Mérimée	
Calvados	Église Saint-Martin de Formigny	Formigny	15th century	church	Mérimée	
Calvados	Église Notre-Dame du Fresne-Camilly	Le Fresne-Camilly	11th – 13th century	church	Mérimée	
Calvados	Église Saint-Martin de Langrune-sur-Mer	Langrune-sur-Mer	13th century	church	Mérimée	
Calvados	Cathédrale Saint-Pierre de Lisieux	Lisieux	12th – 15th century	cathedral	Mérimée	
Calvados	Église Notre-Dame de Louvières	Louvières	14th century	church	Mérimée	
Calvados	Église Saint-Samson d'Ouistreham	Ouistreham	12th century	church	Mérimée	
Calvados	Église Saint-Martin de Ryes	Ryes	12th – 13th century	church	Mérimée	
Calvados	Église Saint-Contest	Saint-Contest		church	Mérimée	
Calvados	Prieuré de Saint-Gabriel	Saint-Gabriel-Brécy	11th – 15th century	priory	Mérimée	
Calvados	Église Notre-Dame-des-Labours de Norrey-en-Bessin	Saint-Manvieu-Norrey	14th century	church	Mérimée	
Calvados	Église Saint-Sulpice de Secqueville-en-Bessin	Secqueville-en-Bessin	11th – 13th century	church	Mérimée	
Calvados	Église Saint-Pierre de Thaon	Thaon	11th – 12th century	church	Mérimée	
Calvados	Église Saint-Pierre de Touques	Touques	11th century	church	Mérimée	
Calvados	Église Saint-Pierre de Tour-en-Bessin	Tour-en-Bessin	12th – 14th century	church	Mérimée	
Cantal	Église Saint-Pierre de Bredons	Albepierre-Bredons	11th – 12th century	church	Mérimée	
Cantal	Basilique Notre-Dame-des-Miracles	Mauriac	11th – 12th century	church	Mérimée	
Cantal	Église Notre-Dame-de-la-Nativité de Villedieu	Villedieu	14th century	church	Mérimée	
Charente	Cathédrale Saint-Pierre d'Angoulême	Angoulême	12th century	cathedral	Mérimée	
Charente	Église Saint-Cybard de Roullet	Roullet-Saint-Estèphe	12th century	church	Mérimée	
Charente	Église de l'abbaye de Saint-Amant-de-Boixe	Saint-Amant-de-Boixe	12th – 14th century	abbey	Mérimée	
Charente	Église Saint-Michel	Saint-Michel	12th century	church	Mérimée	
Charente-Maritime	Church of Saint-Pierre d'Aulnay	Aulnay	12th – 15th century	church	Mérimée	
Charente-Maritime	Pyramide d'Authon-Ébéon	Authon-Ébéon	3rd century	tower	Mérimée	
Charente-Maritime	Aqueduc du Douhet	Le Douhet	1st century	aqueduct	Mérimée	
Charente-Maritime	Église Notre-Dame d'Échillais	Échillais	12th century	church	Mérimée	
Charente-Maritime	Église Saint-Martin d'Esnandes	Esnandes	12th – 14th century	church	Mérimée	
Charente-Maritime	Église Notre-Dame de Fenioux	Fenioux	11th – 14th century	church	Mérimée	
Charente-Maritime	Église Saint-Pierre-de-Salles de Marennes	Marennes	15th – 18th century	church	Mérimée	
Charente-Maritime	Tour de Pirelonge	Saint-Romain-de-Benet	Gallo-romaine	tower	Mérimée	
Charente-Maritime	Amphithéâtre de Saintes	Saintes	1st century	Roman amphitheatre	Mérimée	
Charente-Maritime	Basilique Saint-Eutrope de Saintes	Saintes	12th – 14th century	abbey	Mérimée	
Cher	Palais Jacques-Cœur	Bourges	15th century	palais	Mérimée	
Cher	Hôtel Lallemant	Bourges	15th – 16th century	hôtel particulier	Mérimée	
Cher	Porte Saint-Ours	Bourges	11th – 12th century	city gate	Mérimée	
Cher	Église Saint-Blaise de La Celle	La Celle	12th century	church	Mérimée	
Cher	Vestiges romains de Drevant	Drevant	2nd century	ruins	Mérimée	
Cher	Église Saint-Étienne de Dun-sur-Auron	Dun-sur-Auron	12th – 14th century	collegiate church	Mérimée	
Cher	Château de Mehun-sur-Yèvre	Mehun-sur-Yèvre	12th – 14th century	château fort	Mérimée	
Cher	Collégiale Notre-Dame de Mehun-sur-Yèvre	Mehun-sur-Yèvre	11th – 15th century	church	Mérimée	
Cher	Église Saint-Martin de Plaimpied	Plaimpied-Givaudins	11th – 18th century	church	Mérimée	
Cher	Église Saint-Amand de Saint-Amand-Montrond	Saint-Amand-Montrond	11th – 19th century	church	Mérimée	
Cher	Église de l'Abbaye de Saint-Satur	Saint-Satur	11th – 19th century	abbey	Mérimée	
Corrèze	Église de l'abbaye d'Aubazine	Aubazine	12th century	abbey	Mérimée	
Corrèze	Église de l'abbaye Saint-André de Meymac	Meymac	12th – 13th century	abbey	Mérimée	
Corrèze	Château de Ventadour	Moustier-Ventadour	11th – 15th century	château fort	Mérimée	
Corrèze	Site gallo-romain de Tintignac	Naves	Antiquity	ruins	Mérimée	
Corrèze	église abbatiale du prieuré Saint-Michel-des-Anges	Saint-Angel	11th – 15th century, 17th century	abbey	Mérimée	
Corrèze	église Saint-Cyr Sainte-Julitte de Saint-Cyr-la-Roche	Saint-Cyr-la-Roche	-	church	Mérimée	
Corrèze	Chapelle du château de Ségur	Ségur-le-Château	-	chapel	Mérimée	
Corrèze	Tour de César du château de Turenne	Turenne	13th – 14th century	tower	Mérimée	
Corrèze	Église Saint-Pierre d'Uzerche	Uzerche	12th century	church	Mérimée	
Corse-du-Sud	Stantara d'Apricciani	Vico	Bronze Age	statue-menhir	Mérimée	
Haute-Corse	Tour de Sénèque	Luri	-	tower	Mérimée	
Haute-Corse	Église Saint-Michel de Murato	Murato	12th century	church	Mérimée	
Haute-Corse	Église Saint-Césaire de Rapale	Rapale	13th – 14th century	church	Mérimée	
Haute-Corse	Saint-Florent Cathedral	Saint-Florent	13th century	abandoned cathedral	Mérimée	
Haute-Corse	Chapelle Sainte-Christine de Valle-di-Campoloro	Valle-di-Campoloro	I10th century	chapel	Mérimée	
Côte-d'Or	Basilique Notre-Dame de Beaune	Beaune	13th – 15th century, 17th century	basilica	Mérimée	
Côte-d'Or	Puits de Moïse de la chartreuse de Champmol	Dijon	14th – 15th century	sculpture	Mérimée	
Côte-d'Or	Église Notre-Dame de Dijon	Dijon	13th – 14th century	church	Mérimée	
Côte-d'Or	Église Saint-Michel de Dijon	Dijon	16th century	church	Mérimée	
Côte-d'Or	Église Saint-Genest de Flavigny-sur-Ozerain	Flavigny-sur-Ozerain	13th century, 15th – 16th century	church	Mérimée	
Côte-d'Or	Église du Prieuré de Saint-Thibault	Saint-Thibault	13th – 14th century	abbey	Mérimée	
Côte-d'Or	Basilique Saint-Andoche de Saulieu	Saulieu	12th century	church	Mérimée	
Côte-d'Or	Collégiale Notre-Dame de Semur-en-Auxois	Semur-en-Auxois	14th century	collegiate church	Mérimée	
Côtes-d'Armor	Temple de Mars de Corseul	Corseul	1st century	Roman temple	Mérimée	
Côtes-d'Armor	Tour de Montbran	Pléboulle	12th century	tower	Mérimée; Appears on the 1840 list, but does not appear on any later lists.	
Côtes-d'Armor	Tréguier Cathedral	Tréguier	12th – 16th century	cathedral and cloister	Mérimée	
Creuse	Abbatiale Sainte-Valérie	Chambon-sur-Voueize	12th – 13th century, 15th century	abbey	Mérimée	
Creuse	Thermes romains d'Évaux-les-Bains	Évaux-les-Bains	1st – 3rd century	thermae	Mérimée	
Creuse	Église Notre-Dame de La Souterraine	La Souterraine	11th – 13th century	church	Mérimée	
Dordogne	Église de l'abbaye Saint-Pierre de Brantôme	Brantôme	11th – 12th century	abbey	Mérimée	
Dordogne	Cloître de l'abbaye de Cadouin	Le Buisson-de-Cadouin	12th – 16th century	cloister	Mérimée	
Dordogne	Église Saint-Cybard de Cercles	Cercles	12th century	church	Mérimée	
Dordogne	Amphithéâtre de Périgueux	Périgueux	2nd century	Roman amphitheatre	Mérimée	
Dordogne	Cathédrale Saint-Front	Périgueux	12th century	cathedral	Mérimée	
Dordogne	Église Saint-Étienne-de-la-Cité	Périgueux	12th century	church	Mérimée	
Dordogne	Tour Mataguerre	Périgueux	13th century	tower	Mérimée	
Dordogne	Cathédrale Saint-Sacerdos de Sarlat	Sarlat-la-Canéda	12th – 17th century	abandoned cathedral	Mérimée	
Doubs	Porte Noire	Besançon	2nd century	arc de triomphe	Mérimée	
Doubs	Cloître de l'abbaye de Montbenoît	Montbenoît	12th century	cloister	Mérimée	
Drôme	Cathédrale Notre-Dame de Die	Die	11th – 13th century, 16th century	abandoned cathedral	Mérimée	
Drôme	Collégiale Saint-Sauveur de Grignan	Grignan	16th century	collegiate church	Mérimée	
Drôme	Église de l'Abbaye de Léoncel	Léoncel	12th – 13th century	abbey	Mérimée	
Drôme	Collégiale Saint-Barnard	Romans-sur-Isère	13th – 16th century	collegiate church	Mérimée	
Drôme	Cathédrale Notre-Dame de Saint-Paul-Trois-Châteaux	Saint-Paul-Trois-Châteaux	12th – 15th century	abandoned cathedral	Mérimée	
Drôme	Église de Saint-Restitut	Saint-Restitut	11th century	church	Mérimée	
Drôme	Autel taurobolique de Tain-l'Hermitage	Tain-l'Hermitage	gallo-romain	megalith	Mérimée	
Drôme	Pendentif de Valence	Valence	16th century	oratory	Mérimée	
Eure	Collégiale Notre-Dame des Andelys	Les Andelys	13th century	collegiate church	Mérimée	
Eure	Église Saint-Sauveur du Petit-Andely	Les Andelys	13th century	church	Mérimée	
Eure	Église Sainte-Foy	Conches-en-Ouche	13th – 16th century	church	Mérimée	
Eure	Ancienne abbaye Saint-Taurin	Évreux	13th and 14th centuries, 16th and 18th centuries	abbey	Mérimée	
Eure	Collégiale Saint-Gervais-Saint-Protais de Gisors	Gisors	13th century, 15th and 16th centuries	collegiate church	Mérimée	
Eure	Tour des archives	Vernon	12th century	donjon	Mérimée	
Eure	Tour Saint-Nicolas de l'Abbaye Notre-Dame du Bec	Le Bec-Hellouin	15th century	abbey	Mérimée	
Eure-et-Loir	Collégiale Saint-André de Chartres	Chartres	12th century	collegiate church	Mérimée	
Eure-et-Loir	Église Saint-Aignan de Chartres	Chartres	16th century	church	Mérimée	
Eure-et-Loir	Église Saint-Pierre de Chartres	Chartres	13th – 14th century	church	Mérimée	
Eure-et-Loir	Beffroi de Dreux	Dreux	16th century	belfry	Mérimée	
Eure-et-Loir	Église Saint-Pierre de Dreux	Dreux	13th – 15th century, 17th century	church	Mérimée	
Finistère	Basilique Notre-Dame du Folgoët	Le Folgoët	14th – 15th century, 17th century	collegiate church	Mérimée	
Finistère	Église de Lambader	Plouvorn	16th century	church	Mérimée	
Finistère	Église Sainte-Croix de Quimperlé	Quimperlé	11th century, 17th – 18th century	church	Mérimée	
Finistère	Saint-Pol-de-Léon Cathedral	Saint-Pol-de-Léon	12th – 16th century	abandoned cathedral	Mérimée	
Finistère	Kreisker chapel	Saint-Pol-de-Léon	14th – 15th century	chapel	Mérimée	
Gard	Pont Ambroix	Gallargues-le-Montueux	1st century	bridge	Mérimée	
Gard	Arènes de Nîmes	Nîmes	1st century	Roman amphitheatre	Mérimée	
Gard	Castellum divisorium de Nîmes	Nîmes	1st century	water tower	Mérimée	
Gard	Thermes antiques et nymphée (Temple de Diane)	Nîmes	1st century	thermae	Mérimée	
Gard	Maison Carrée	Nîmes	1st century	Roman temple	Mérimée	
Gard	Porte d'Auguste	Nîmes	1st century BCE	city gate	Mérimée	
Gard	Porte de France	Nîmes	1st century BCE	city gate	Mérimée	
Gard	Tour Magne	Nîmes	1st century	tower	Mérimée	
Gard	Église de l'abbaye de Saint-Gilles	Saint-Gilles	12th century	abbey	Mérimée	
Gard	Pont du Gard	Vers-Pont-du-Gard	1st century	bridge/aqueduct	Mérimée	
Haute-Garonne	Église de Saint-Aventin	Saint-Aventin	12th century	church	Mérimée	
Haute-Garonne	Cathédrale Notre-Dame de Saint-Bertrand-de-Comminges	Saint-Bertrand-de-Comminges	11th – 12th century, 14th – 16th century	cathedral	Mérimée	
Haute-Garonne	Collégiale Saint-Pierre de Saint-Gaudens	Saint-Gaudens	11th – 15th century	collegiate church	Mérimée	
Haute-Garonne	Couvent des Augustins	Toulouse	14th – 15th century	convent	Mérimée	
Haute-Garonne	Couvent des Jacobins	Toulouse	13th – 14th century	convent	Mérimée	
Haute-Garonne	Église Notre-Dame du Taur	Toulouse	14th century	church	Mérimée	
Haute-Garonne	Église Saint-Sernin de Toulouse	Toulouse	11th – 12th century	church	Mérimée	
Haute-Garonne	Capitole de Toulouse	Toulouse	12th – 18th century	town hall	Mérimée	
Haute-Garonne	Basilique Saint-Just de Valcabrère	Valcabrère	11th – 12th century	church	Mérimée	
Haute-Garonne	Église Saint-Pierre-et-Saint-Phébade de Venerque	Venerque	12th – 15th century	church	Mérimée	
Gers	Donjon du château de Bassoues	Bassoues	14th century	donjon	Mérimée	
Gers	Cathédrale Saint-Pierre de Condom	Condom	14th – V11th century	cathedral	Mérimée	
Gironde	Cathédrale Saint-Jean-Baptiste de Bazas	Bazas	13th – 14th century	abandoned cathedral	Mérimée	
Gironde	Église Saint-Seurin de Bordeaux	Bordeaux	11th century	church	Mérimée	
Gironde	Église Sainte-Croix de Bordeaux	Bordeaux	12th century	abbey	Mérimée	
Gironde	Église Sainte-Eulalie de Bordeaux	Bordeaux	Medieval	church	Mérimée	
Gironde	Amphithéâtre de Bordeaux dit Palais Gallien	Bordeaux	3rd century	Roman amphitheatre	Mérimée	
Gironde	Église Saint-Pierre de Loupiac	Loupiac	12th – 16th century	church	Mérimée	
Gironde	Collégiale de Saint-Émilion et cloître	Saint-Émilion	12th – 16th century	collegiate church	Mérimée	
Gironde	Église Saint-Sauveur-et-Saint-Martin de Saint-Macaire	Saint-Macaire	12th century	church	Mérimée	
Gironde	Abbaye de La Sauve-Majeure	La Sauve	12th – 13th century	abbey	Mérimée	
Gironde	Collégiale Notre-Dame d'Uzeste	Uzeste	13th – 14th century	collegiate church	Mérimée	
Gironde	Église Saint-Pierre de Vertheuil	Vertheuil	12th century	church	Mérimée	
Hérault	Cathédrale Saint-Étienne d'Agde	Agde	12th century	abandoned cathedral	Mérimée	
Hérault	Béziers Cathedral	Béziers	13th century	abandoned cathedral	Mérimée	
Hérault	Église Saint-Paul de Clermont-l'Hérault	Clermont-l'Hérault	13th – 14th century	church	Mérimée et Mérimée	
Hérault	Lodève Cathedral	Lodève	13th – 14th century	abandoned cathedral	Mérimée	
Hérault	Église Sainte-Croix de Celleneuve	Montpellier	12th – 14th century	church	Mérimée	
Hérault	Église de l'abbaye de Saint-Guilhem-le-Désert et cloître	Saint-Guilhem-le-Désert	11th – 13th century	abbey	Mérimée	
Hérault	Cathédrale de Saint-Pons-de-Thomières	Saint-Pons-de-Thomières	12th century, 17th – 18th century	abandoned cathedral	Mérimée	
Hérault	Cathédrale Saint-Pierre-et-Saint-Paul de Maguelone	Villeneuve-lès-Maguelone	12th – 13th century	abandoned cathedral	Mérimée	
Hérault	Église Saint-Étienne de Villeneuve-lès-Maguelone	Villeneuve-lès-Maguelone	12th century	church	Mérimée	
Ille-et-Vilaine	Dol Cathedral	Dol-de-Bretagne	13th – 14th century	abandoned cathedral	Mérimée	
Ille-et-Vilaine	Dolmen de la Roche-aux-Fées	Essé	Néolithique	dolmen	Mérimée	
Ille-et-Vilaine	Chapelle Sainte-Agathe de Langon	Langon	3rd – 12th century	chapel	Mérimée et Mérimée	
Ille-et-Vilaine	Église Notre-Dame de Vitré	Vitré	15th – 16th century	church	Mérimée	
Indre	Église Saint-Laurent et Notre-Dame de Gargilesse	Gargilesse-Dampierre	11th century	church	Mérimée	
Indre	Tour blanche d'Issoudun	Issoudun	12th – 13th century	tower	Mérimée	
Indre	Église Saint-Sylvain de Levroux	Levroux	13th century	church	Mérimée	
Indre	Abbatiale de Méobecq	Méobecq	11th century	abbey	Mérimée	
Indre	Église Saint-Étienne de Neuvy-Saint-Sépulchre	Neuvy-Saint-Sépulchre	12th century	church	Mérimée	
Indre-et-Loire	Château d'Amboise	Amboise	16th century	castle	Mérimée	
Indre-et-Loire	Collégiale Saint-Martin de Candes-Saint-Martin	Candes-Saint-Martin	12th century	collegiate church	Mérimée	
Indre-et-Loire	Château de Chenonceau	Chenonceaux	15th – 16th century	castle	Mérimée	
Indre-et-Loire	Abbaye Saint-Mexme de Chinon	Chinon	11th century	abbey	Mérimée	
Indre-et-Loire	Château de Chinon	Chinon	14th – 15th century	castle	Mérimée	
Indre-et-Loire	Pile de Cinq-Mars	Cinq-Mars-la-Pile	2nd century	funerary monument	Mérimée	
Indre-et-Loire	Collégiale Saint-Ours de Loches	Loches	11th – 12th century	collegiate church	Mérimée	
Indre-et-Loire	Clocher de l'ancienne église Saint-Antoine de Loches	Loches	16th century	bell tower	Mérimée	
Indre-et-Loire	Église Saint-Jean-Baptiste de Montrésor	Montrésor	16th century	church	Mérimée	
Indre-et-Loire	Église de l'abbaye Saint-Pierre de Preuilly-sur-Claise	Preuilly-sur-Claise	11th – 15th century	abbey	Mérimée	
Indre-et-Loire	Lanterne de Rochecorbon	Rochecorbon	11th century	Lanterns of the Dead	Mérimée	
Indre-et-Loire	Tour de l'Horloge de la basilique Saint-Martin de Tours	Tours	13th century	bell tower	Mérimée	
Indre-et-Loire	Église Saint-Julien de Tours	Tours	12th – 13th century	church	Mérimée	
Isère	Église Saint-Theudère de Saint-Chef	Saint-Chef	12th – 13th century	church	Mérimée	
Isère	Église Saint-André-le-Bas de Vienne	Vienne	12th – 14th century	church	Mérimée	
Isère	Vienne Cathedral	Vienne	13th – 16th century	abandoned cathedral	Mérimée	
Isère	Escaliers antiques de Vienne	Vienne	Antiquity	stairs	Mérimée	
Isère	Temple of Augustus and Livia	Vienne	1st century BCE	Roman temple	Mérimée	
Isère	Théâtre antique de Vienne	Vienne	1st century	Roman theatre	Mérimée	
Jura	Église Saint-Christophe de Chissey-sur-Loue	Chissey-sur-Loue	13th century	church	Mérimée	
Landes	Église Sainte-Quitterie d'Aire	Aire-sur-l'Adour	12th – 18th century	church	Mérimée	
Loir-et-Cher	Château de Blois	Blois	16th – 17th century	castle	Mérimée et Mérimée	
Loir-et-Cher	Église Saint-Nicolas de Blois	Blois	12th – 14th century	church	Mérimée	
Loir-et-Cher	Fontaine Louis-XII	Blois	16th century	fountain	Mérimée et Mérimée	
Loir-et-Cher	Château de Beauregard	Cellettes	16th – 17th century	castle	Mérimée	
Loir-et-Cher	Château de Chambord	Chambord	16th – 17th century	castle	Mérimée et Mérimée	
Loir-et-Cher	Château de Chaumont-sur-Loire	Chaumont-sur-Loire	15th – 16th century	castle	Mérimée	
Loir-et-Cher	Château de Cheverny	Cheverny	17th – 18th century	castle	Mérimée	
Loir-et-Cher	Tumulus du Tertre, et nécropole gallo-romaine	Soings-en-Sologne	Prehistory	tumulus	Mérimée	
Loir-et-Cher	Bâtiment des Mazelles	Thésée	Antiquity	ruins	Mérimée	
Loir-et-Cher	Abbaye de la Trinité de Vendôme	Vendôme	12th – 15th century	abbey	Mérimée	
Loir-et-Cher	Château de Vendôme	Vendôme	12th – 14th century	castle	Mérimée	
Loire	Église Saint-Martin d'Ambierle	Ambierle	15th century	church	Mérimée	
Loire	Église Saint-André de Bourg-Argental	Bourg-Argental	12th century	church	Mérimée	
Loire	Abbaye de la Bénisson-Dieu	La Bénisson-Dieu	12th – 15th century, 17th century	abbey	Mérimée	
Loire	Collégiale Notre-Dame-d'Espérance de Montbrison	Montbrison	13th to 16th century	church	Mérimée	
Haute-Loire	Saint Michel d'Aiguilhe	Aiguilhe	11th – 12th century	chapel	Mérimée	
Haute-Loire	Basilique Saint-Julien de Brioude	Brioude	11th – 12th century	collegiate church	Mérimée	
Haute-Loire	Église de l'abbaye de la Chaise-Dieu	La Chaise-Dieu	14th century	abbey	Mérimée	
Haute-Loire	Église Saint-Saturnin de Chanteuges	Chanteuges	12th century	church	Mérimée	
Haute-Loire	Église de l'abbaye Saint-Chaffre du Monastier	Le Monastier-sur-Gazeille	11th century, 15th – 16th century	abbey	Mérimée	
Haute-Loire	Château de Polignac	Polignac	12th – 16th century	castle	Mérimée	
Haute-Loire	Baptistère Saint-Jean du Puy-en-Velay	Le Puy-en-Velay	-	Baptistery	Mérimée	
Haute-Loire	Église Saint-Georges de Saint-Paulien	Saint-Paulien	12th – 16th century	church	Mérimée	
Haute-Loire	Église Saint-Médard de Saugues	Saugues	12th century	collegiate church	Mérimée	
Loire-Atlantique	Église Saint-Goustan du Croisic	Le Croisic	-	church	Mérimée	
Loire-Atlantique	Collégiale Saint-Aubin de Guérande	Guérande	12th – 16th century	collegiate church	Mérimée	
Loire-Atlantique	Château des ducs de Bretagne	Nantes	15th – 16th century	castle	Mérimée	
Loire-Atlantique	Château de Châteaubriant	Châteaubriant	11th – 16th century	castle	Mérimée et Mérimée removed in 1887 reinstated in 1921	
Loiret	Donjon du château de Beaugency dit Tour de César	Beaugency	11th century	donjon	Mérimée et Mérimée	
Loiret	Église Saint-Étienne de Beaugency	Beaugency	11th century	church	Mérimée et Mérimée	
Loiret	Hôtel de ville de Beaugency	Beaugency	16th century	town hall	Mérimée et Mérimée	
Loiret	Église Notre-Dame de Beaugency	Beaugency	11th – 12th century	church	Mérimée	
Loiret	Basilique Notre-Dame de Cléry-Saint-André	Cléry-Saint-André	15th century	collegiate church	Mérimée et Mérimée	
Loiret	Église de l'abbaye de Ferrières	Ferrières-en-Gâtinais	12th – 13th century	abbey	Mérimée	
Loiret	Oratoire carolingien de Germigny-des-Prés	Germigny-des-Prés	I10th century	church	Mérimée	
Loiret	Château de Gien	Gien	15th century	castle	Mérimée	
Loiret	Collégiale Saint-Liphard de Meung-sur-Loire	Meung-sur-Loire	12th – 13th century	collegiate church	Mérimée	
Loiret	Hôtel des Créneaux d'Orléans	Orléans	-	abandoned town hall	Mérimée	
Loiret	Église de l'abbaye de Saint-Benoît-sur-Loire	Saint-Benoît-sur-Loire	11th – 12th century	abbey	Mérimée	
Lot	Église Saint-Pierre d'Assier	Assier	16th century	church	Mérimée	
Lot	Pont Valentré	Cahors	16th century	bridge	Mérimée	
Lot	Chapelle Notre-Dame-de-Pitié de Figeac	Figeac	-	chapel	Mérimée	
Lot	Deux Aiguilles de Figeac	Figeac	13th – 14th century	obelisks	Mérimée	
Lot	Église Saint-Sauveur de Figeac	Figeac	12th – 15th century	church	Mérimée	
Lot	Église de l'abbaye Sainte-Marie de Souillac	Souillac	12th century	abbey	Mérimée	
Lot-et-Garonne	La Tourasse	Aiguillon	1st century	funerary monument ?	Mérimée et Mérimée	
Lot-et-Garonne	Église Saint-Vincent du Mas-d'Agenais	Le Mas-d'Agenais	11th – 12th century	church	Mérimée	
Lot-et-Garonne	Église Saint-Jean-Baptiste de Mézin	Mézin	11th – 14th century	church	Mérimée et Mérimée	
Lot-et-Garonne	Ruines romaines de Nérac	Nérac	4th – 5th century	Roman villa	Mérimée et Mérimée	
Lot-et-Garonne	Château de Xaintrailles	Xaintrailles	12th – 15th century	castle	Mérimée	
Lozère	Église Saint-Gervais-Saint-Protais de Langogne	Langogne	12th century, 14th – 15th century	church	Mérimée	
Lozère	Mausoleum of Lanuéjols	Lanuéjols	2nd ou 3rd century	mausoleum	Mérimée et Mérimée	
Maine-et-Loire	Abbaye Saint-Serge d'Angers	Angers	13th century, 17th – 18th century	church	Mérimée	
Maine-et-Loire	Église de l'abbaye du Ronceray d'Angers	Angers	11th century	abbey	Mérimée	
Maine-et-Loire	Église de la Trinité d'Angers	Angers	12th century	church	Mérimée	
Maine-et-Loire	Hôpital Saint-Jean	Angers	12th century	hospital	Mérimée	
Maine-et-Loire	Abbaye de Fontevraud	Fontevraud-l'Abbaye	12th century, 15th – 16th century	abbey	Mérimée	
Maine-et-Loire	Église Notre-Dame-de-Nantilly	Saumur	12th et 15th centuries	church	Mérimée et Mérimée	
Maine-et-Loire	Église Saint-Pierre-et-Saint-Romain de Savennières	Savennières	10th – 12th century	church	Mérimée	
Manche	Château de Bricquebec	Bricquebec	12th century	castle	Mérimée et Mérimée	
Manche	Église de l'abbaye de Cerisy-la-Forêt	Cerisy-la-Forêt	11th century	abbey	Mérimée	
Manche	Aqueduc de Coutances	Coutances	13th century	aqueduct	Mérimée	
Manche	Château de La Haye-du-Puits	La Haye-du-Puits	-	castle	Mérimée	
Manche	Abbatiale Sainte-Trinité de Lessay	Lessay	11th century	abbey	Mérimée	
Manche	Collégiale Saint-Évroult	Mortain	13th – 14th century	collegiate church	Mérimée	
Manche	Église Notre-Dame de Saint-Lô	Saint-Lô	-	church	Mérimée	
Manche	Abbaye de Saint-Sauveur-le-Vicomte	Saint-Sauveur-le-Vicomte	-	abbey	Mérimée	
Manche	Château de Saint-Sauveur-le-Vicomte	Saint-Sauveur-le-Vicomte	-	castle	Mérimée	
Manche	Église de Sainte-Marie-du-Mont	Sainte-Marie-du-Mont	11th – 19th century	church	Mérimée et Mérimée	
Manche	Église de Sainte-Mère-Église	Sainte-Mère-Église	12th – 14th century	church	Mérimée	
Manche	Château des Matignon	Torigni-sur-Vire	-	castle	Mérimée	
Marne	Collégiale Notre-Dame en Vaux de Châlons-en-Champagne	Châlons-en-Champagne	12th – 13th century	collegiate church	Mérimée	
Marne	Portail Saint-Martin d'Épernay	Épernay	16th century	door	Mérimée et Mérimée	
Marne	Basilique Notre-Dame de l'Épine	L'Épine	14th to 16th century	church	Mérimée	
Marne	Église Saint-Pierre-et-Saint-Paul d'Orbais-l'Abbaye	Orbais-l'Abbaye	13th century	church	Mérimée et Mérimée	
Marne	Basilique Saint-Remi de Reims	Reims	12th century	abbey	Mérimée	
Marne	Porte de Mars	Reims	3rd century	city gate	Mérimée	
Haute-Marne	Chapelle du collège des Jésuites de Chaumont	Chaumont	17th century	chapel	Mérimée	
Haute-Marne	Église de l'Assomption d'Isômes	Isômes	13th century	church	Mérimée	
Haute-Marne	Ancienne église Saint-Didier de Langres	Langres	12th – 13th century	church	Mérimée	
Mayenne	Église de l'abbaye Notre-Dame d'Évron	Évron	11th – 14th century	abbey	Mérimée et Mérimée	
Mayenne	Site archéologique de Jublains	Jublains	Antiquity	castrum	Mérimée	
Mayenne	Cathédrale de la Sainte-Trinité de Laval	Laval	11th – 16th century	cathedral	Mérimée et Mérimée	
Mayenne	Château neuf de Laval	Laval	16th century	castle	Mérimée	
Mayenne	Château vieux de Laval	Laval	11th – 16th century	château fort	Mérimée et Mérimée	
Mayenne	Basilique Notre-Dame d'Avesnières	Laval	12th century	church	Mérimée et Mérimée	
Meurthe-et-Moselle	Palace of the Dukes of Lorraine	Nancy	16th century	palais	Mérimée	
Meurthe-et-Moselle	Tombeaux des ducs de Lorraine et chapelle des Cordeliers	Nancy	12th century au 18th century	tombs	Mérimée	
Meurthe-et-Moselle	Église Saint-Martin de Pont-à-Mousson	Pont-à-Mousson	13th century	church	Mérimée	
Meurthe-et-Moselle	Basilique de Saint-Nicolas-de-Port	Saint-Nicolas-de-Port	15th – 16th century	church	Mérimée	
Meurthe-et-Moselle	Cathédrale Saint-Étienne de Toul	Toul	13th – 16th century	cathedral	Mérimée	
Meurthe-et-Moselle	Château de Vaudémont	Vaudémont	11th century	castle	Mérimée et Mérimée	
Meuse	Basilique Notre-Dame d'Avioth	Avioth	13th – 15th century	church	Mérimée et Mérimée	
Meuse	Tour Valéran	Ligny-en-Barrois	13th – 14th century	tower	Mérimée	
Meuse	Église Saint-Louvent de Rembercourt-aux-Pots	Rembercourt-Sommaisne	15th century	church	Mérimée	
Morbihan	Basilique Notre-Dame-de-Quelven	Guern	15th century	church	Mérimée et Mérimée	
Morbihan	Église Saint-Armel de Ploërmel	Ploërmel	15th century	church	Mérimée et Mérimée	
Morbihan	Église de l'abbaye de Saint-Gildas de Rhuys	Saint-Gildas-de-Rhuys	10th – 17th century	abbey	Mérimée	
Morbihan	Château de Suscinio	Sarzeau	13th – 14th century	castle	Mérimée et Mérimée	
Moselle	Pont-aqueduc de Gorze à Metz	Ars-sur-Moselle et Jouy-aux-Arches	2nd century	aqueduct	Mérimée	
Moselle	Chapelle de Metz	Metz	12th – 13th century	chapel	Mérimée	
Moselle	Château d'Ottange	Ottange	Medieval	château fort	Mérimée	
Nièvre	Abbatiale Notre-Dame de La Charité-sur-Loire	La Charité-sur-Loire	12th century	abbey	Mérimée	
Nièvre	Collégiale Saint-Martin de Clamecy	Clamecy	13th – 16th century	collegiate church	Mérimée	
Nièvre	Église Notre-Dame-du-Pré de Donzy	Donzy	12th century	church	Mérimée	
Nièvre	Église Saint-Sylvestre de Jailly	Jailly	12th century	church	Mérimée	
Nièvre	Église Saint-Étienne de Nevers	Nevers	11th century	church	Mérimée	
Nièvre	Palais ducal de Nevers	Nevers	15th – 16th century	palais	Mérimée	
Nièvre	Église Saint-Marcel de Prémery	Prémery	13th – 14th century	church	Mérimée	
Nièvre	Église de Saint-Révérien	Saint-Révérien	12th century	church	Mérimée	
Nièvre	église de Saint-Saulge	Saint-Saulge	12th – 16th century	church	Mérimée	
Nièvre	Collégiale Saint-Léger de Tannay	Tannay	13th – 16th century	collegiate church	Mérimée et Mérimée	
Nord	Beffroi de Bergues	Bergues	14th – 16th century détruit 1944/déclassé 1954/reconstruit différent 1958-61/inscrit 2004	belfry	Mérimée	
Nord	Pyramide de Fontenoy	Cysoing	18th century	obelisk	Mérimée	
Nord	Beffroi de Dunkerque	Dunkerque	16th century	belfry	Mérimée	
Nord	Ruines romaines de Famars	Famars	1st – 4th century	ruins	Mérimée	
Nord	Église Saint-Maurice de Lille	Lille	14th century	church	Mérimée	
Oise	Église Saint-Pierre-et-Saint-Paul	Baron	12th – 15th century	church	Mérimée	
Oise	Cathédrale Saint-Pierre	Beauvais	11th – 16th century	cathedral	Mérimée	
Oise	Église de la Basse-Œuvre	Beauvais	11th – 13th century	church	Mérimée	
Oise	Église de l'abbaye Notre-Dame d'Ourscamp	Chiry-Ourscamp	12th et 13th centuries	abbey	Mérimée	
Oise	Église Saint-Antoine de Compiègne	Compiègne	13th – 16th century	church	Mérimée	
Oise	Hôtel de ville de Compiègne	Compiègne	16th century	town hall	Mérimée	
Oise	Abbatiale Notre-Dame	Morienval	11th – 13th century	abbey	Mérimée	
Oise	Cathédrale Notre-Dame	Noyon	12th – 19th century	cathedral	Mérimée	
Oise	Église et chapelle de l'abbaye Saint-Germer-de-Fly	Saint-Germer-de-Fly	12th – 13th century	abbey	Mérimée et Mérimée	
Oise	Église prieurale de Saint-Leu-d'Esserent	Saint-Leu-d'Esserent	12th et 13th centuries	abbey	Mérimée	
Oise	Abbatiale de Saint-Martin-aux-Bois	Saint-Martin-aux-Bois	13th century	abbey	Mérimée	
Oise	Senlis Cathedral	Senlis	12th century	cathedral	Mérimée	
Oise	Église Saint-Éloi	Tracy-le-Val	12th century	church	Mérimée	
Orne	Église Notre-Dame-sur-l'Eau	Domfront	11th century	church	Mérimée	
Pas-de-Calais	Beffroi d'Arras	Arras	14th – 15th century	belfry	Mérimée	
Pas-de-Calais	Abbaye Saint-Bertin	Saint-Omer	14th – 16th century	abbey	Mérimée	
Pas-de-Calais	Cathédrale Notre-Dame de Saint-Omer	Saint-Omer	12th – 15th century	cathedral	Mérimée	
Puy-de-Dôme	Église Notre-Dame de Chamalières	Chamalières	10th – 12th century	church	Mérimée	
Puy-de-Dôme	Église Saint-Julien de Chauriat	Chauriat	12th century	church	Mérimée	
Puy-de-Dôme	Basilique Notre-Dame-du-Port	Clermont-Ferrand	11th – 12th century	collegiate church	Mérimée	
Puy-de-Dôme	Collégiale Saint-Victor et Sainte-Couronne d'Ennezat	Ennezat	12th century	collegiate church	Mérimée	
Puy-de-Dôme	Église Saint-Austremoine d'Issoire	Issoire	12th century	church	Mérimée	
Puy-de-Dôme	Église Saint-Sébastien de Manglieu	Manglieu	12th century	church	Mérimée	
Puy-de-Dôme	Église de l'abbaye de Mozac	Mozac	12th century	abbey	Mérimée	
Puy-de-Dôme	Basilique Notre-Dame d'Orcival	Orcival	12th century	church	Mérimée et Mérimée	
Puy-de-Dôme	Sainte-Chapelle de Riom	Riom	14th – 15th century	chapel	Mérimée	
Puy-de-Dôme	Église Saint-Amable de Riom	Riom	15th century	church	Mérimée et Mérimée	
Puy-de-Dôme	Église de Saint-Nectaire	Saint-Nectaire, Puy-de-Dôme	12th century	church	Mérimée	
Puy-de-Dôme	Chœur de l'église Saint-Pierre de Vic-le-Comte	Vic-le-Comte	16th century	church	Mérimée	
Pyrénées-Atlantiques	Église Notre-Dame-de-l'Assomption de Lembeye	Lembeye	15th century	church	Mérimée	
Pyrénées-Atlantiques	Cathédrale Notre-Dame-de-l'Assomption de Lescar	Lescar	12th – 13th century	cathedral	Mérimée	
Pyrénées-Atlantiques	Château Moncade	Orthez	13th – 14th century	castle	Mérimée	
Pyrénées-Atlantiques	Château de Pau	Pau	12th – 15th century	castle	Mérimée	
Hautes-Pyrénées	Église des Hospitaliers-de-Saint-Jean de Luz-Saint-Sauveur	Luz-Saint-Sauveur	11th – 16th century	church	Mérimée	
Hautes-Pyrénées	Abbatiale de Saint-Savin	Saint-Savin	11th – 14th century	abbey	Mérimée	
Pyrénées-Orientales	Église du prieuré de Marcevol	Arboussols	12th century	abbey	Mérimée	
Pyrénées-Orientales	Église Sainte-Marie de Corneilla-de-Conflent	Corneilla-de-Conflent	11th – 12th century	church	Mérimée	
Pyrénées-Orientales	Église Notre-Dame de Coustouges	Coustouges	12th century	church	Mérimée	
Pyrénées-Orientales	Pont du Diable	Céret	14th century	bridge	Mérimée	
Pyrénées-Orientales	Cloître d'Elne	Elne	12th – 14th century	cloister	Mérimée	
Pyrénées-Orientales	Loge de mer	Perpignan	15th century	market hall	Mérimée	
Pyrénées-Orientales	Église Saint-Jean le Vieux de Perpignan	Perpignan	11th – 12th century	church	Mérimée	
Pyrénées-Orientales	Église Notre-Dame-de-la-Merci de Planès	Planès	13th century	chapel	Mérimée	
Bas-Rhin	Abbatiale de Marmoutier	Marmoutier	11th – 18th century	abbey	Mérimée, Mérimée et Mérimée	
Bas-Rhin	Abbatiale Saint-Pierre-et-Saint-Paul de Neuwiller-lès-Saverne	Neuwiller-lès-Saverne	8th – 13th century	abbey	Mérimée	
Bas-Rhin	Mur païen du mont Sainte-Odile	Ottrott	Antiquity	wall	Mérimée	
Bas-Rhin	Monastère de Sainte-Odile	Ottrott	12th century	abbey	Mérimée et Mérimée	
Bas-Rhin	Église Saints-Pierre-et-Paul	Rosheim	12th century	church	Mérimée	
Bas-Rhin	Église Saint-Jean-Baptiste	Saint-Jean-Saverne	12th century	church	Mérimée et Mérimée	
Haut-Rhin	Collégiale Saint-Martin	Colmar	13th – 16th century	collegiate church	Mérimée	
Haut-Rhin	Château de Dagsbourg	Eguisheim	12th – 13th century	château fort	Mérimée et Mérimée	
Haut-Rhin	Châteaux de Weckmund et de Wahlenbourg, dits château de Haut-Eguisheim	Eguisheim, Husseren-les-Châteaux	12th – 13th century	château fort	Mérimée, Mérimée et Mérimée	
Haut-Rhin	Église Saint-Martin de Pfaffenheim	Pfaffenheim	12th – 15th century	church	Mérimée	
Haut-Rhin	Château du Hohlandsbourg	Wintzenheim	13th – 16th century	château fort	Mérimée et Mérimée	
Rhône	Église Saint-Nizier	Lyon	14th – 16th century	church	Mérimée et Mérimée	
Rhône	Basilique Saint-Martin d'Ainay	Lyon	11th – 12th century	abbey	Mérimée	
Rhône	Palais du Miroir	Saint-Romain-en-Gal	gallo-romain	thermae	Mérimée	
Rhône	Collégiale Notre-Dame-des-Marais	Villefranche-sur-Saône	12th – 16th century	collegiate church	Mérimée	
Saône-et-Loire	Théâtre romain d'Autun	Autun	3rd century	Roman theatre	Mérimée	
Saône-et-Loire	Temple de Janus d'Autun	Autun	2nd century	fanum	Mérimée	
Saône-et-Loire	Pyramide de Couhard	Autun	2nd century	mausoleum	Mérimée	
Saône-et-Loire	Cathédrale Saint-Lazare d'Autun	Autun	12th century	cathedral	Mérimée	
Saône-et-Loire	Abbatiale Saint-Philibert de Tournus	Tournus	11th – 12th century	abbey	Mérimée	
Sarthe	Église Notre-Dame-des-Marais de la Ferté-Bernard	La Ferté-Bernard	14th – 17th century	church	Mérimée et Mérimée	
Sarthe	Église Notre-Dame-du-Pré du Mans	Le Mans	11th – 12th century	church	Mérimée	
Sarthe	Église Notre-Dame-de-la-Couture du Mans	Le Mans	12th century	church	Mérimée	
Sarthe	Église Notre-Dame de Saint-Calais	Saint-Calais	15th – 16th century	church	Mérimée	
Sarthe	Église Saint-Hippolyte de Vivoin	Vivoin	11th – 15th century	church	Mérimée	
Seine-Maritime	Église Notre-Dame de Caudebec-en-Caux	Caudebec-en-Caux	15th – 16th centuries	church	Mérimée	
Seine-Maritime	Église Saint-Jean d'Abbetot	La Cerlangue	11th, 15th – 16th centuries	church	Mérimée	
Seine-Maritime	Église Saint-Jacques de Dieppe	Dieppe	11th century	church	Mérimée	
Seine-Maritime	Église Notre-Dame d'Étretat	Étretat	11th et 13th centuries	church	Mérimée	
Seine-Maritime	Collégiale Notre-Dame-et-Saint-Laurent d'Eu	Eu	11th century	collegiate church	Mérimée	
Seine-Maritime	Abbaye de la Trinité de Fécamp	Fécamp	17th et 18th centuries	abbey	Mérimée	
Seine-Maritime	Église Saint-Hildebert de Gournay-en-Bray	Gournay-en-Bray	12th et 13th centuries	church	Mérimée	
Seine-Maritime	Église Saint-Martin d'Harfleur	Harfleur	11th – 19th centuries	church	Mérimée	
Seine-Maritime	Ruines du théâtre antique de Lillebonne	Lillebonne	2nd century	Roman theatre	Mérimée	
Seine-Maritime	Église Saint-Jacques-le-Majeur de Moulineaux	Moulineaux	13th century	church	Mérimée	
Seine-Maritime	Abbaye Saint-Ouen	Rouen	I10th – 18th centuries	abbey	Mérimée	
Seine-Maritime	Église Saint-Gervais de Rouen	Rouen	11th – 19th centuries	church	Mérimée	
Seine-Maritime	Église Saint-Maclou de Rouen	Rouen	13th – X10th centuries	church	Mérimée	
Seine-Maritime	Église Saint-Patrice de Rouen	Rouen	13th – 19th centuries	church	Mérimée	
Seine-Maritime	Palais de Justice	Rouen	11th – 19th centuries	parlement	Mérimée	
Seine-Maritime	Tour Jeanne d'Arc	Rouen	13th et 19th centuries	donjon	Mérimée	
Seine-Maritime	Abbaye Saint-Georges de Boscherville	Saint-Martin-de-Boscherville	12th century	abbey	Mérimée	
Seine-Maritime	Église Saint-Jacques du Tréport	Le Tréport	11th – 19th centuries	church	Mérimée	
Seine-Maritime	Église Notre-Dame de Valliquerville	Valliquerville	13th – 19th centuries	church	Mérimée	
Seine-et-Marne	Hôtel-Dieu de Brie-Comte-Robert	Brie-Comte-Robert	13th century	hôtel-Dieu	Mérimée	
Seine-et-Marne	Église Saint-Étienne	Brie-Comte-Robert	14th century	church	Mérimée	
Seine-et-Marne	Collégiale Saint-Martin de Champeaux	Champeaux	11th – 13th century	collegiate church	Mérimée	
Seine-et-Marne	Église Notre-Dame-de-l'Assomption de Château-Landon	Château-Landon	12th – 13th century	church	Mérimée	
Seine-et-Marne	Cryptes de Jouarre	Jouarre	7th century	crypt	Mérimée	
Seine-et-Marne	Cathédrale Saint-Étienne de Meaux	Meaux	12th – 15th century	cathedral	Mérimée	
Seine-et-Marne	Collégiale Notre-Dame de Melun	Melun	11th – 12th century	collegiate church	Mérimée et Mérimée	
Seine-et-Marne	Porte de Samois et porte de Bourgogne de Moret-sur-Loing	Moret-sur-Loing	12th century	city gates	Mérimée	
Seine-et-Marne	Église Notre-Dame de Moret-sur-Loing	Moret-sur-Loing	12th century	church	Mérimée	
Seine-et-Marne	Collégiale Saint-Quiriace de Provins	Provins	12th – 18th century	collegiate church	Mérimée	
Seine-et-Marne	Église de Voulton	Voulton	12th century	church	Mérimée	
Yvelines	Église Saint-Jacques-le-Majeur-et-Saint-Christophe d'Houdan	Houdan	14th – 18th century	church	Mérimée	
Yvelines	Collégiale Notre-Dame de Mantes-la-Jolie	Mantes-la-Jolie	12th – 14th century	collegiate church	Mérimée	
Yvelines	Église Saint-Pierre de Montfort-l'Amaury	Montfort-l'Amaury	15th – 17th century	church	Mérimée	
Yvelines	Collégiale Notre-Dame de Poissy	Poissy	11th – 14th century	collegiate church	Mérimée	
Deux-Sèvres	Église Notre-Dame de Bressuire	Bressuire	10th – 12th century	church	Mérimée déclassée en 1900 re-classée en 1913	
Deux-Sèvres	Église Saint-Maixent de Verrines-sous-Celles	Celles-sur-Belle	Haut Medieval	church	Mérimée et Mérimée	
Deux-Sèvres	Église Saint-Chartier de Javarzay	Chef-Boutonne	11th century	church	Mérimée	
Deux-Sèvres	Donjon de Niort	Niort	12th century	castle	Mérimée	
Deux-Sèvres	Collégiale Saint-Maurice d'Oiron	Oiron	16th – 17th century	collegiate church	Mérimée	
Deux-Sèvres	Abbatiale de Saint-Maixent-l'École	Saint-Maixent-l'École	11th – 17th century	abbey	Mérimée et Mérimée	
Deux-Sèvres	Chapelle du château des ducs de La Trémoille	Thouars	11th – 17th century	chapel	Mérimée	
Somme	Église Saint-Vulfran	Abbeville	16th century	church	Mérimée	
Somme	Église Notre-Dame du prieuré d'Airaines	Airaines	12th century	abbey	Mérimée	
Somme	Citadelle d'Amiens	Amiens	14th – 17th centuries	citadel	Mérimée	
Somme	Abbatiale de Berteaucourt-les-Dames	Berteaucourt-les-Dames	11th – 12th centuries	abbey	Mérimée	
Somme	La Pierre de Gargantua	Doingt	Néolithique	menhir	Mérimée	
Somme	Maison échevinale de Domart-en-Ponthieu	Domart-en-Ponthieu	15th century	house	Mérimée	
Somme	Chapelle du Saint-Esprit de Rue	Rue	14th – 16th centuries	chapel	Mérimée	
Somme	Abbatiale de Saint-Riquier	Saint-Riquier	11th – 16th centuries	abbey	Mérimée	
Somme	Église Notre-Dame-de-Lorette	Tilloloy	-	church	Mérimée	
Tarn	Abbaye Saint-Michel	Gaillac	-	abbey	Mérimée	
Tarn-et-Garonne	Château de Bruniquel	Bruniquel	-	castle	Mérimée	
Tarn-et-Garonne	Clocher de l'église	Caussade	-	bell tower	Mérimée	
Tarn-et-Garonne	Abbaye Saint-Pierre de Moissac	Moissac	11th – 19th century	abbey	Mérimée	
Tarn-et-Garonne	Collégiale Saint-Martin	Montpezat-de-Quercy	14th century	collegiate church	Mérimée	
Var	Amphithéâtre	Fréjus	1st et 2nd centuries	Roman amphitheatre	Mérimée et Mérimée	
Var	Église Saint-Louis	Hyères	13th century	church	Mérimée et Mérimée	
Var	Basilique Sainte-Marie-Madeleine	Saint-Maximin-la-Sainte-Baume	13th – 17th century	church	Mérimée	
Var	Église Saint-Pierre-aux-Liens	Six-Fours-les-Plages	12th et 17th centuries	church	Mérimée	
Var	Abbaye du Thoronet	Le Thoronet	12th et 13th centuries	abbey	Mérimée	
Vaucluse	Cathédrale Notre-Dame-des-Doms	Avignon	12th – 17th centuries	cathedral	Mérimée	
Vaucluse	Chapelle et pont Saint-Bénézet	Avignon	12th century	bridge	Mérimée	
Vaucluse	Collégiale Saint-Pierre d'Avignon	Avignon	14th – 16th centuries	collegiate church	Mérimée	
Vaucluse	Palais des papes d'Avignon	Avignon	14th century	palais	Mérimée	
Vaucluse	Arc de Carpentras	Carpentras	1st century	arc de triomphe	Mérimée	
Vaucluse	Cathédrale Saint-Siffrein	Carpentras	15th – 17th centuries	cathedral	Mérimée	
Vaucluse	Arc antique de Cavaillon	Cavaillon	1st century	Arch	Mérimée	
Vaucluse	Cathédrale Notre-Dame-et-Saint-Véran	Cavaillon	11th – 13th centuries	cathedral	Mérimée	
Vaucluse	Église Saint-Véran	Fontaine-de-Vaucluse	11th century	church	Mérimée	
Vaucluse	Théâtre antique d'Orange	Orange	1st century	Roman theatre	Mérimée	
Vaucluse	Arc d'Orange	Orange	1st century	arc de triomphe	Mérimée	
Vaucluse	Église Notre-Dame-de-Nazareth de Pernes-les-Fontaines	Pernes-les-Fontaines	Gallo-romain et 12th century	church	Mérimée	
Vaucluse	Église Notre-Dame-du-Lac du Thor	Le Thor	12th century	church	Mérimée	
Vaucluse	Cathédrale Notre-Dame-de-Nazareth	Vaison-la-Romaine	12th century	cathedral	Mérimée	
Vaucluse	Chapelle Saint-Quenin	Vaison-la-Romaine	12th century	chapel	Mérimée	
Vaucluse	Pont romain	Vaison-la-Romaine	1st century	bridge	Mérimée	
Vaucluse	Baptistère de Venasque	Venasque	6th et 7th centuries	Baptistery	Mérimée	
Vendée	Église Saint-Nicolas	Maillezais		church	Mérimée	
Vendée	Église Notre-Dame-de-l'Assomption de Vouvant	Vouvant	11th et 12th centuries	church	Mérimée	
Vienne	Château des évêques de Poitiers	Chauvigny	11th – 14th centuries	castle	Mérimée et Mérimée	
Vienne	Église Notre-Dame	Chauvigny	I10th et 18th centuries	church	Mérimée et Mérimée	
Vienne	Château d'Harcourt	Chauvigny	12th – 15th centuries	castle	Mérimée et Mérimée	
Vienne	Lanterne des morts de Château-Larcher	Château-Larcher		Lanterns of the Dead	Mérimée	
Vienne	Église Saint-Nicolas	Civray	7th century	church	Mérimée	
Vienne	Église Notre-Dame de Fontaine-le-Comte	Fontaine-le-Comte		church	Mérimée	
Vienne	Château de Gençay	Gençay		castle	Mérimée	
Vienne	Hôtel-Dieu de Montmorillon	Montmorillon	11th – 19th centuries	hôtel-Dieu	Mérimée, Mérimée et Mérimée	
Vienne	Château de Montreuil-Bonnin	Montreuil-Bonnin		castle	Mérimée	
Vienne	Église Saint-Hilaire le Grand	Poitiers	11th et 12th centuries	church	Mérimée	
Vienne	Église Notre-Dame la Grande	Poitiers	11th et 12th centuries	church	Mérimée	
Vienne	Église Saint-Jean de Montierneuf	Poitiers	11th – 14th centuries	church	Mérimée	
Vienne	Amphithéâtre de Poitiers	Poitiers	2nd century	Roman amphitheatre	Mérimée	
Vienne	Abbey Church of Saint-Savin-sur-Gartempe	Saint-Savin	11th – 17th centuries	abbey	Mérimée et Mérimée	
Haute-Vienne	Château de Rochechouart	Rochechouart	13th – 16th centuries	castle	Mérimée	
Haute-Vienne	Collégiale Saint-Junien	Saint-Junien	12th – 15th centuries	collegiate church	Mérimée	
Haute-Vienne	Collégiale Saint-Yrieix	Saint-Yrieix-la-Perche		collegiate church	Mérimée	
Vosges	Abbaye Saint-Pierre d'Étival	Étival-Clairefontaine	12th – 18th centuries	abbey	Mérimée	
Vosges	Abbaye de Moyenmoutier	Moyenmoutier	11th century	abbey	Mérimée	
Vosges	Maison natale de Jeanne d'Arc	Domrémy-la-Pucelle	15th century	house	Mérimée	
Yonne	Cathédrale Saint-Étienne d'Auxerre	Auxerre	11th – 16th centuries	cathedral	Mérimée	
Yonne	Église Saint-Lazare d'Avallon	Avallon	11th – 16th centuries	church	Mérimée	
Yonne	Église abbatiale de Pontigny	Pontigny		abbey	Mérimée	
Yonne	Église de Saint-Florentin	Saint-Florentin	13th century	church	Mérimée	
Yonne	Collégiale Saint-Pierre de Saint-Julien-du-Sault	Saint-Julien-du-Sault	14th – 15th centuries	collegiate church	Mérimée	
Yonne	Église Notre-Dame de Saint-Père	Saint-Père	13th – 15th centuries	church	Mérimée	
Yonne	Église de la Madeleine de Vézelay et le bâtiment des Moines	Vézelay	12th century	abbey	Mérimée	
Yonne	Cathédrale Saint-Étienne de Sens	Sens	12th – 16th centuries	cathedral	Mérimée	
Essonne	Église Saint-Denis d'Athis-Mons	Athis-Mons	12th century	church	Mérimée et Mérimée	
Essonne	Cathédrale Saint-Spire de Corbeil-Essonnes	Corbeil-Essonnes	14th century	cathedral	Mérimée	
Essonne	Collégiale Notre-Dame-du-Fort d'Étampes	Étampes	12th – 13th century	collegiate church	Mérimée et Mérimée	
Essonne	Château de Montlhéry	Montlhéry	10th – 14th century	château fort	Mérimée et Mérimée	
Essonne	Église Saint-Sulpice de Saint-Sulpice-de-Favières	Saint-Sulpice-de-Favières	13th – 14th century	church	Mérimée	
Val-d'Oise	Église Saint-Sulpice de Chars	Chars	12th – 16th century	church	Mérimée	
Val-d'Oise	Église Saint-Acceul d'Écouen	Écouen	16th – 13th century	church	Mérimée	
Val-d'Oise	Église de la Nativité-de-la-Vierge du Mesnil-Aubry	Le Mesnil-Aubry	15th – 17th century	church	Mérimée	
Val-d'Oise	Collégiale Saint-Martin de Montmorency	Montmorency	16th century	collegiate church	Mérimée	
Val-d'Oise	Cathédrale Saint-Maclou de Pontoise	Pontoise	12th – 16th century	cathedral	Mérimée	
Val-d'Oise	Église Notre-Dame de Vétheuil	Vétheuil	12th – 16th century	church	Mérimée	
