= Église Saint-André de Saint-André-de-Bâgé =

Coordinates: 46°18′09″N 4°55′26″E

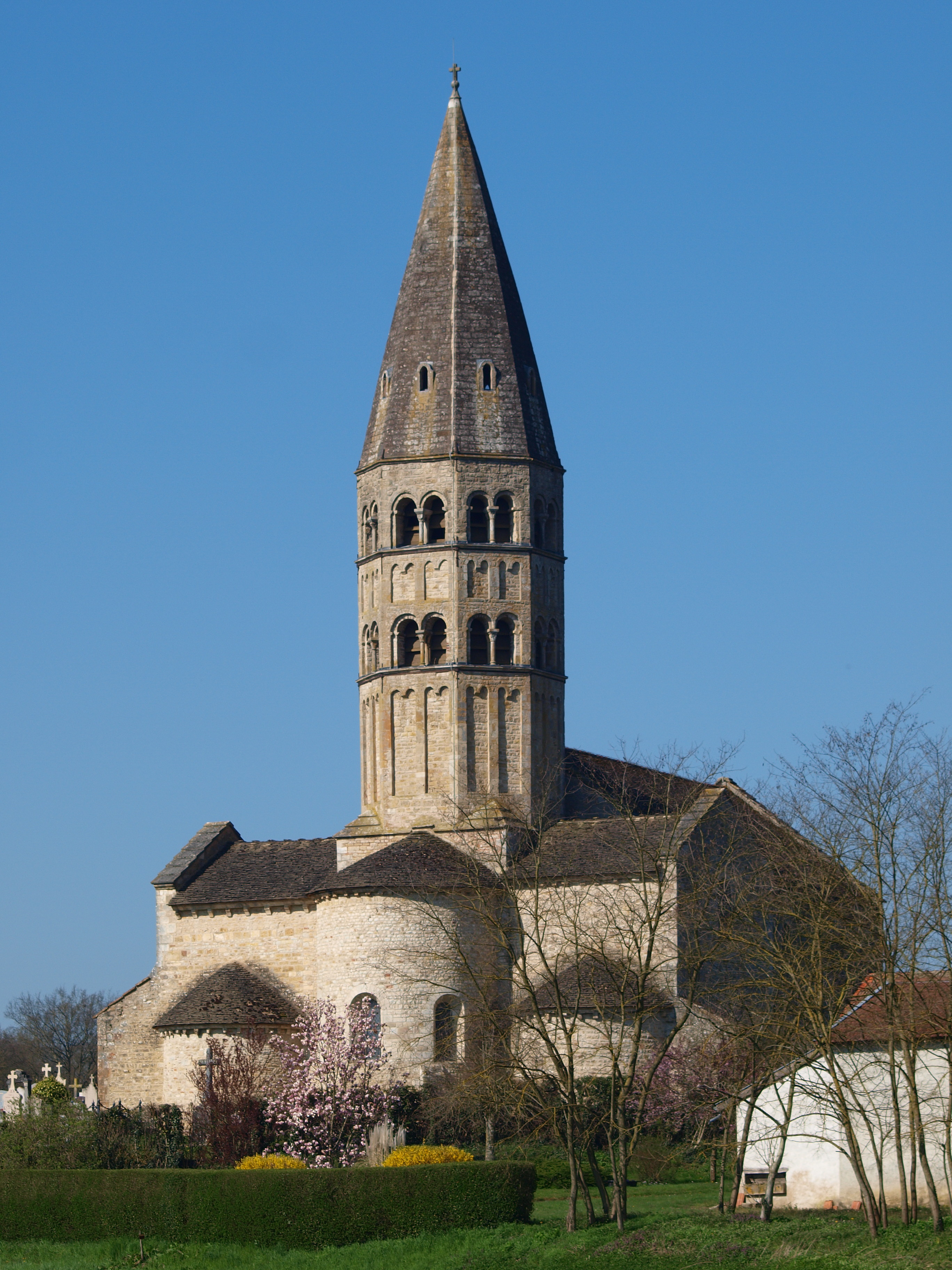
Church of Saint-André in Saint-André-de-Bâgé, Ain, France

Église Saint-André de Saint-André-de-Bâgé is a former Catholic church located in Saint-André-de-Bâgé, in the French department of Ain in the Auvergne-Rhône-Alpes region.

== History ==
The Romanesque church is dated to 12th century and is the subject of a classification as historical monuments by the 1840 list. The construction of this building was intended by the Lords of Bage, specifically Ulrich I who decided its construction and gave it to the abbey of Saint-Philibert Tournus (1074).

Its role was to accommodate the burials of the Sires of Bâgé. The last descendant Guy, father of Sybille, was buried there in 1268. No trace remains of these graves, however, there are several other tombstones still visible. Some bear Gothic inscriptions and one is distinguished by its circular epitaph.

This church ends with a vaulted cul-de-four apse, pierced with three large semi-circular bays. This apse has its perimeter decorated with an exceptional gallery of arches.

This church is no longer currently assigned to worship.
