= Église Sainte-Christine de Valle-di-Campoloro =

Church in Haute-Corse, France

Coordinates: 42°20′14″N 9°30′03″E

Église Sainte-Christine de Valle-di-Campoloro is a church in Valle-di-Campoloro, Haute-Corse, Corsica, located to the northeast of Cervione. The building was classified as a Historic Monument in 1840.
