= Gallo-Roman temple of Izernore =

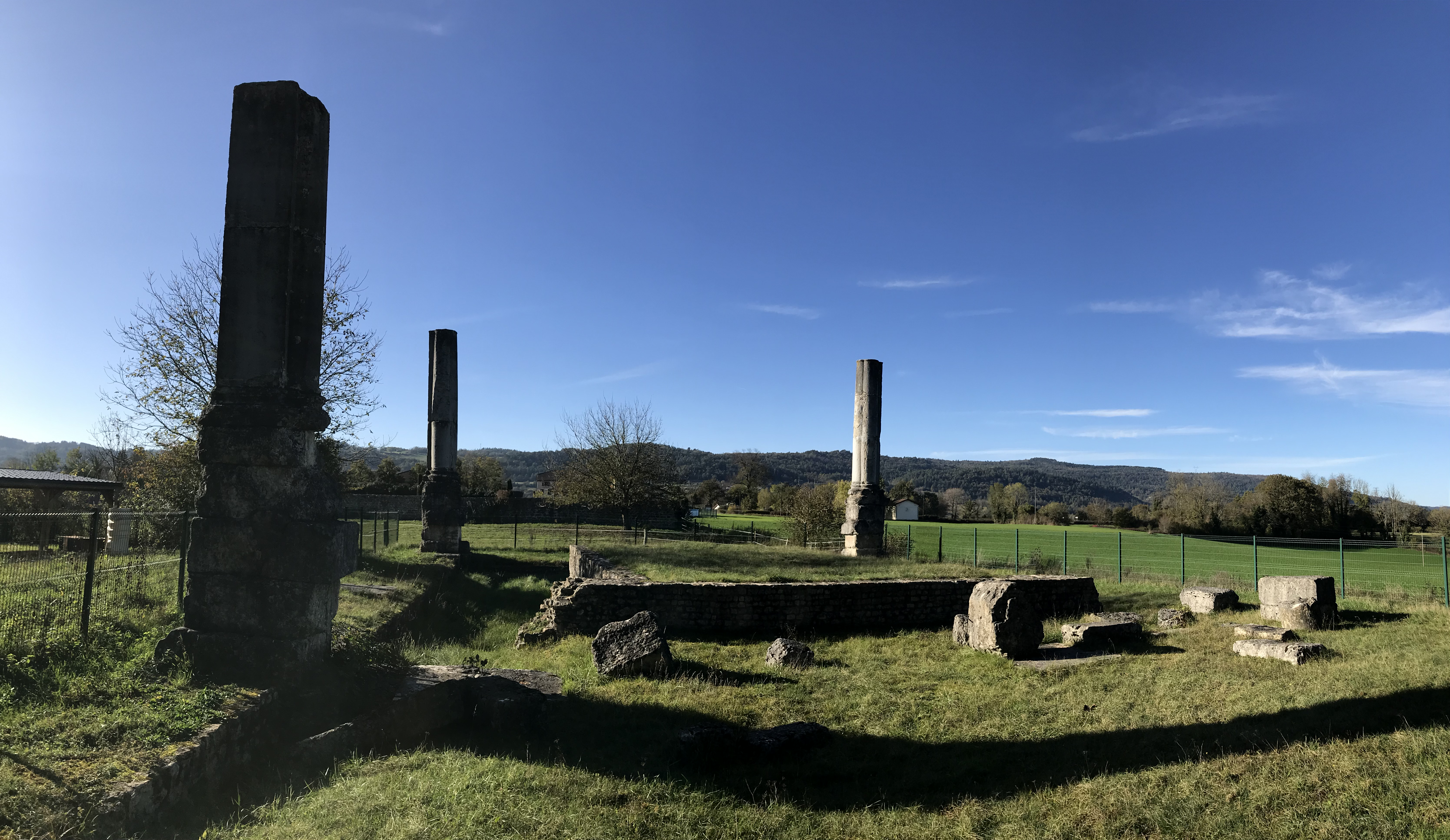
- Temple remains at Izernore.

- Location within France
- 46°01′24″N 5°33′31″E
- Type: Romano-Celtic temple
- Periods: Classical Antiquity
- Cultures: Sequani, Gallo-Roman
- Location: Izernore, Ain (France)
- Region: Auvergne-Rhône-Alpes

History
- Built: 1st to 2nd Centuries

Site notes
- Material: Limestone
- Elevation: 462 m (1,516 ft)
- Excavation dates: 1783, 1863–1866
- Condition: Ruined

Monument historique
- Designated: 1840

The Gallo-Roman temple of Izernore is a set of religious remains dating from the Gallo-Roman period, located in the commune of Izernore in the French department of Ain in the Auvergne-Rhône-Alpes region.

It consists of two monumental buildings which were constructed in succession on the same site between the middle of the first century and end of the second century CE. Later studies and excavations have unearthed partial remains of the temple, and hence the full reconstruction of the appearance of the two monuments is unknown. The monuments were part of a larger religious complex attached to the town of Isarnodurum, whose contours are not known but is identified with the current commune of Izernore. This agglomeration and the religious complex, appears to have been abandoned at the end of antiquity.

The standing remains consist of three corner columns and blocks scattered around the site. The religious complex is also notable for its rich painted decorations, of which several fragments have been preserved, but the deities to which they were dedicated remain unknown. The temple is classified as a historical monument and is the only ancient vestige in the department of Ain.

== Location ==
=== Geography ===
The temple is located approximately 500 m (1,600 ft) north of the municipal capital of Izernore, in the French department of Ain in the Auvergne-Rhône-Alpes region. It is situated at an altitude of 462 m (1,516 ft) at the base of the Oignin-Izernore syncline, which stretches along the north to south direction. The temple is built on the edge of the ridge overlooking the channel.

=== Historical context ===
Schematic plan of the site

There is uncertainty as to the civitas to which the ancient Gallo-Roman city of Isarnodurum (current Izernore) was attached. It is difficult to locate the temple in the ancient geography of the Isarnodurum because studies have so far been unable to determine the ancient extent of the city which became Izernore later due to ageing and fragmentary nature of the excavations. The ancient location of the monument depended on the extent of the city of Isarnodurum compared to the contemporary city of Izernore. If Isarnodurum was located to the northwest of the current city, then the monument was located in its eastern part. On the other hand, if the ancient occupation extended towards the south, partially or totally encompassing the current city, then it was located to the northeast of the current city. An ancient road, oriented north–south, passed to the west of the temple.

The temple appears as one of the components of an important cult site, comprising several fanum along with various wells, dumps, and thermal baths to the north. A theatre might have existed based on evidence of the monumental adornment commonly observed in other cities but not yet verified. The excavations carried out in the well area, however, indicated a strictly domestic use, which questions their religious function and therefore their link with the temple.

== History ==
The site of the temple was certainly occupied before its construction, as evidenced by the Gallic coins found, but neither the nature nor the importance of this occupation could be determined with certainty. The construction of the first temple, the exact dating of which remains uncertain, started during the Flavian dynasty in the later half of the first century CE. The architectural fragments found in the area could not be used to date its construction as there is nothing to attribute them with certainty to this first temple. Similarly, the time of the construction of the second temple is not known, and there is no archaeological evidence to establish it. However, it was constructed after the previous phase was completed towards the end of the first century CE, and extended through the second century CE. These dating proposals are also based, in part, on the examination of the coins found on the site. This dating method has its limits, as imperial coins continued to circulate well after the reign of the person they commemorated and there is no evidence that the temple was still in use as a cultural monument at the time of their deposition.

The temple, like the whole ancient settlement, seems to have been abandoned at the end of antiquity or at the beginning of the Middle Ages. It is explained by the recovery of materials from the original temple which were reused in later constructions. A column of the temple forms the base of another ancient monument in the city. The site of Izernore was considered as a hypothetical location for the Battle of Alesia in the ninth and tenth centuries, based on an interpretation of Julius Caesar 's accounts. A passage from the Life of the Fathers of the Jura mentions the presence of this monument, then ruined. It was only much later that the visible remains of the temple were described by local scholars such as Samuel Guichenon (History of Bresse and Bugey, 1650), François Henry Egenod (correspondence, 1706), and Eugène de Veyle (Explanation of the Roman antiquities of Bresse, Bugey, Valromey and Gex, manuscript, 1720).

The first excavations on the site of Izernore was carried out by Thomas Riboud in 1783. The results of these excavations, taken up and synthesized by Jules Baux in 1866, consists of a description of the remains and decorations unearthed from the site. The site was classified as a historic monument in 1840. In 1863, the excavations resumed, and a detailed report was published in 1866. The site's protective fence was built in 1910, and the remains were extensively restored with the reconstruction of the base of the cella and the walls of the peristyle. Further research on the building was subsequently carried out under the direction of Raymond Chevallier, with the help of the Archaeological Group of the Touring Club of France, and published in an article entitled "Five years of archaeological research in Izernore" in 1968.

A project to enhance the temple was launched in the early 2010s. Following specific investigations on the site, an in-depth study of the architectural elements scattered around the monument and the nearby town and extensive documentation was carried out.

== Description ==
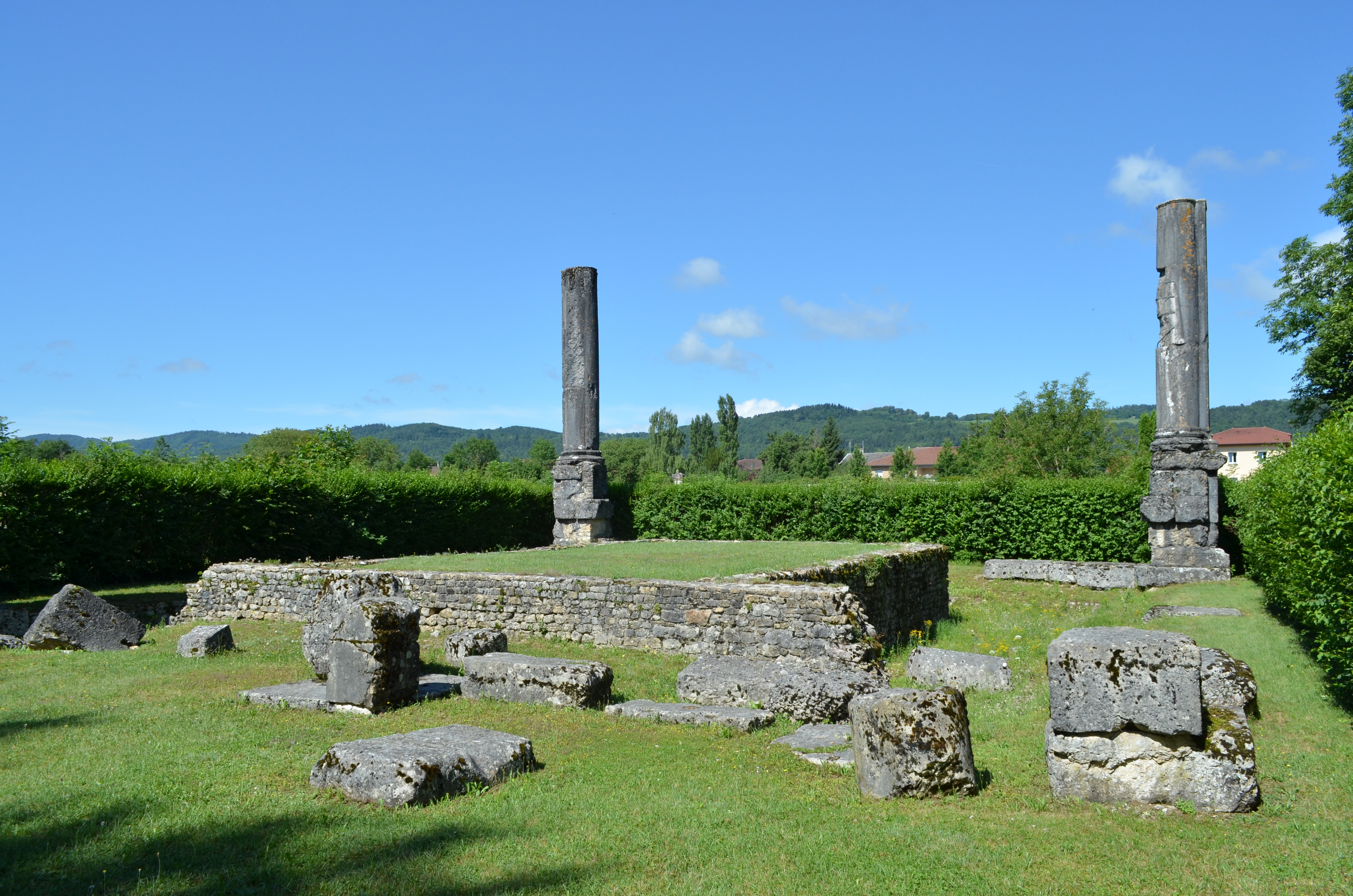
Remains of the temple.

The religious function of the first monument could not be formally attested. Measuring at least 15 m (49 ft) by 17.5 m (57 ft), it appears to have the form of a single storey building, surrounded by a peripheral columns of the Corinthian order. The foundations which are approximately 0.95 m (3 ft 1 in) wide, and a few elements remain in place. The old descriptions refer to walls, partitions or cellars. The temple has an entrance on its southern side, which led to the sanctuary itself. The elements found in place, those used in the second monument and those identified nearby as possibly belonging to this temple, suggest a construction using soft limestone.

The construction of the second temple on the site of the first building and reusing some of the elements, started later. The second temple might have served for ritual functions or housed a relic earlier housed in the first building. The second building, the remains of which are still visible, is built on the foundations of the first. The walls of the first temple were surrounded externally by those of the second and only seem to be dismantled once construction was completed. This process perhaps allowed the religious functions of the monument to be maintained throughout this construction phase.
