= Church of Saint-Jean, Caen =

Catholic church in Caen, France

Church of Saint-Jean
- Église Saint-Jean de Caen
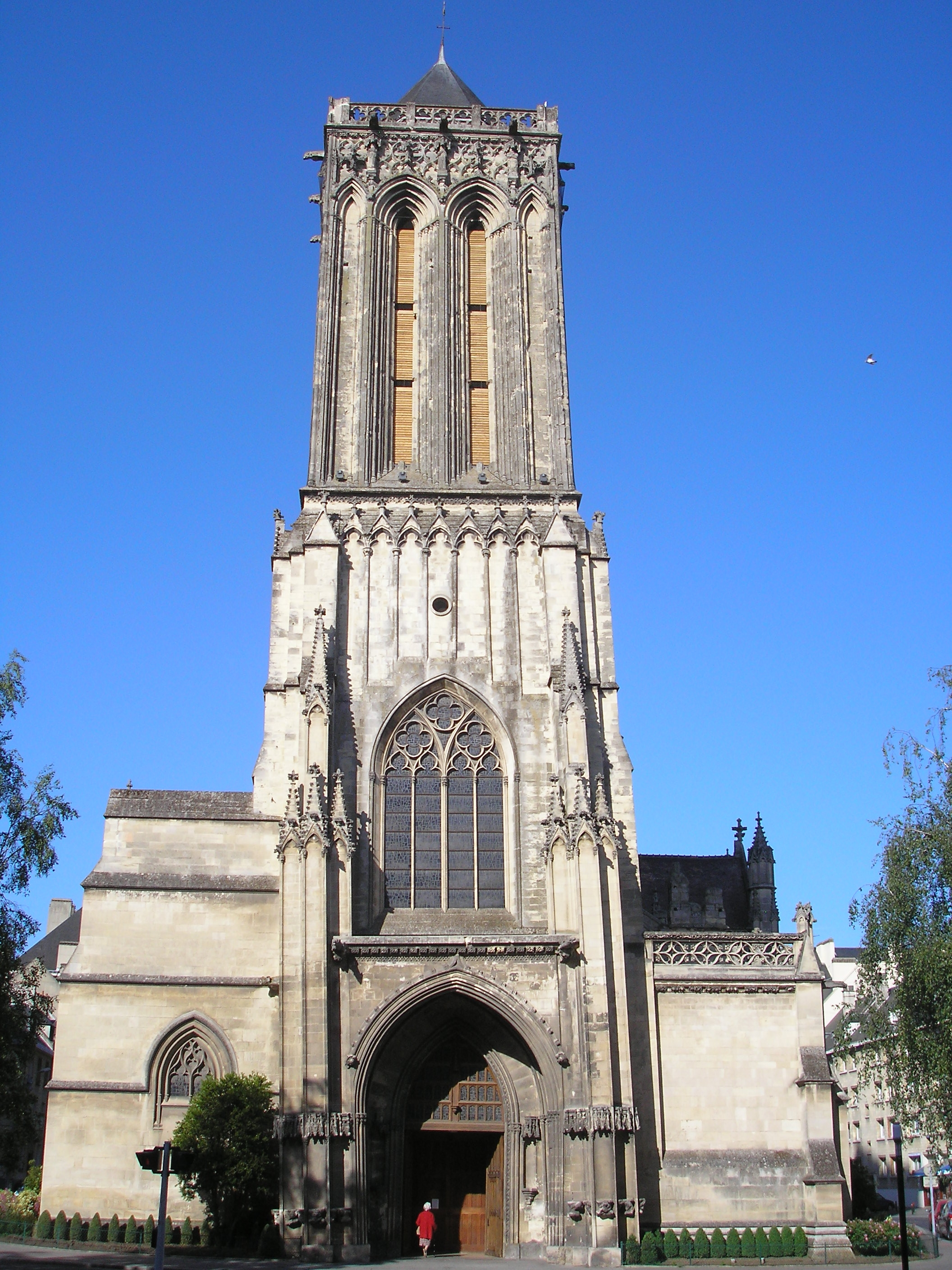
- Church of Saint-Jean
- 49°10′50″N 0°21′28″W
- Location: Caen, Calvados, Normandy
- Country: France
- Denomination: Roman catholic

Architecture
- Heritage designation: Monument historique
- Designated: 1840
- Architectural type: Gothic, renaissance
- Years built: 15th century–16th century

The church of Saint-Jean de Caen is the parish church of the Saint-Jean district in Caen, France. It was classified as a historical monument in the list of French historic monuments protected in 1840.

The first place of worship, dedicated to the Apostle John, was founded in the seventh century on a Roman road crossing the marshes of the lower valley of the Orne. This axis, connecting Augustodurum (Bayeux) to Noviomagus Lexoviorum (Lisieux), later became rue Exmoisine, now rue Saint-Jean. In 1954–1956, monolithic sarcophagi made of Caen stone were discovered during work in the church. They testify to the probable existence of a small necropolis along the Roman road and an oratory founded nearby. Of this pre-Romanesque sanctuary, nothing remains.
