= Monastère fortifié de l'abbaye de Lérins =

Monastery in Alpes-Maritimes, France

Coordinates: 43.5053°N 7.0478°E

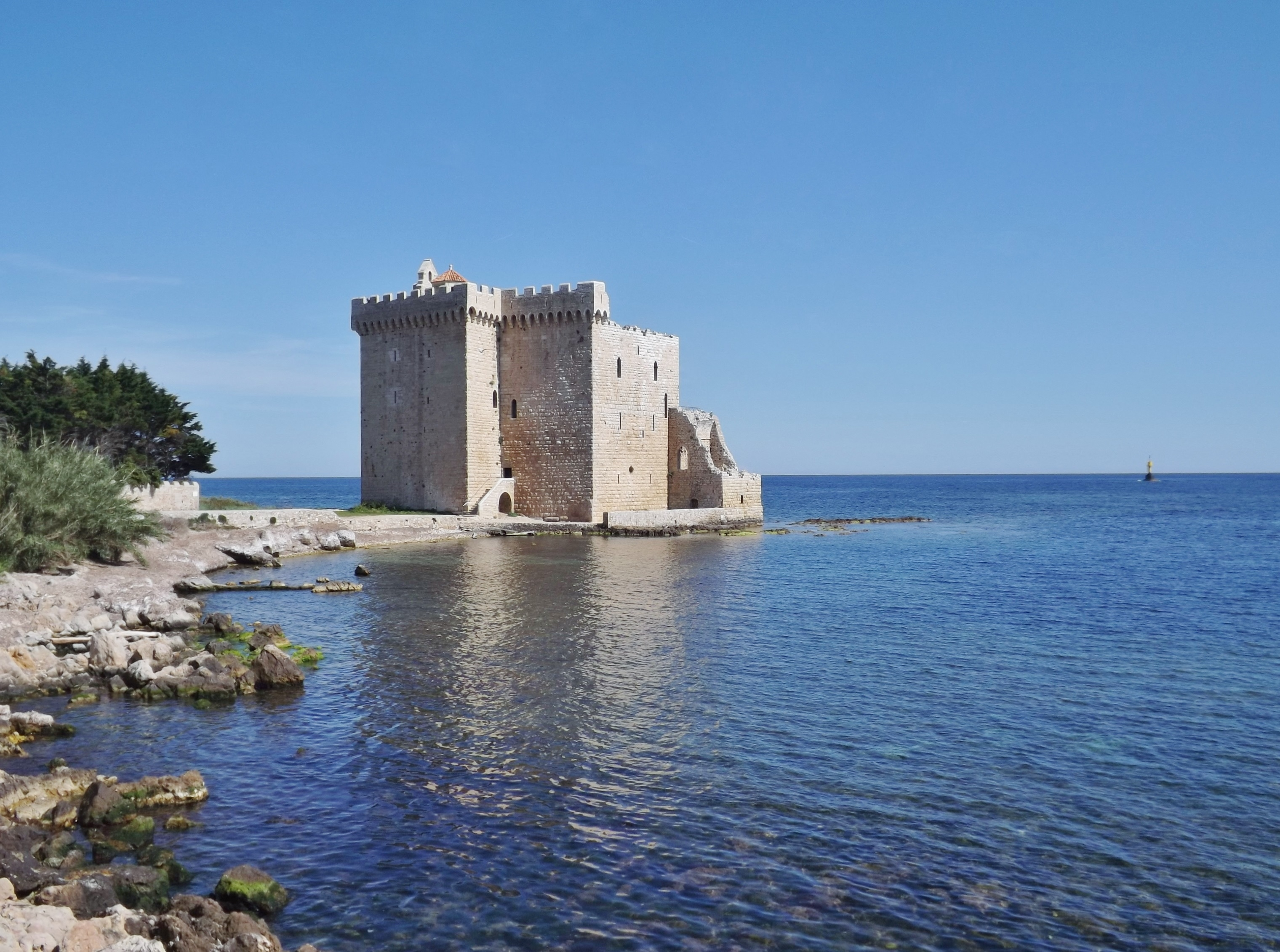

Monastère fortifié de l'abbaye de Lérins is a building on Île Saint-Honorat in the Bay of Cannes in the Alpes-Maritimes of France. Construction began in the late 11th century on the southern coast to protect the island and Lérins Abbey.

It was listed as a Monument historique in 1840.
