= Château de Weckmund =

Ruined castle in Haut-Rhin, Alsace, France

Coordinates: 48.0385°N 7.2735°E

Château de Weckmund is a ruined castle in the commune of Husseren-les-Châteaux, in the department of Haut-Rhin, Alsace, France. It is a listed historical monument since 1840.

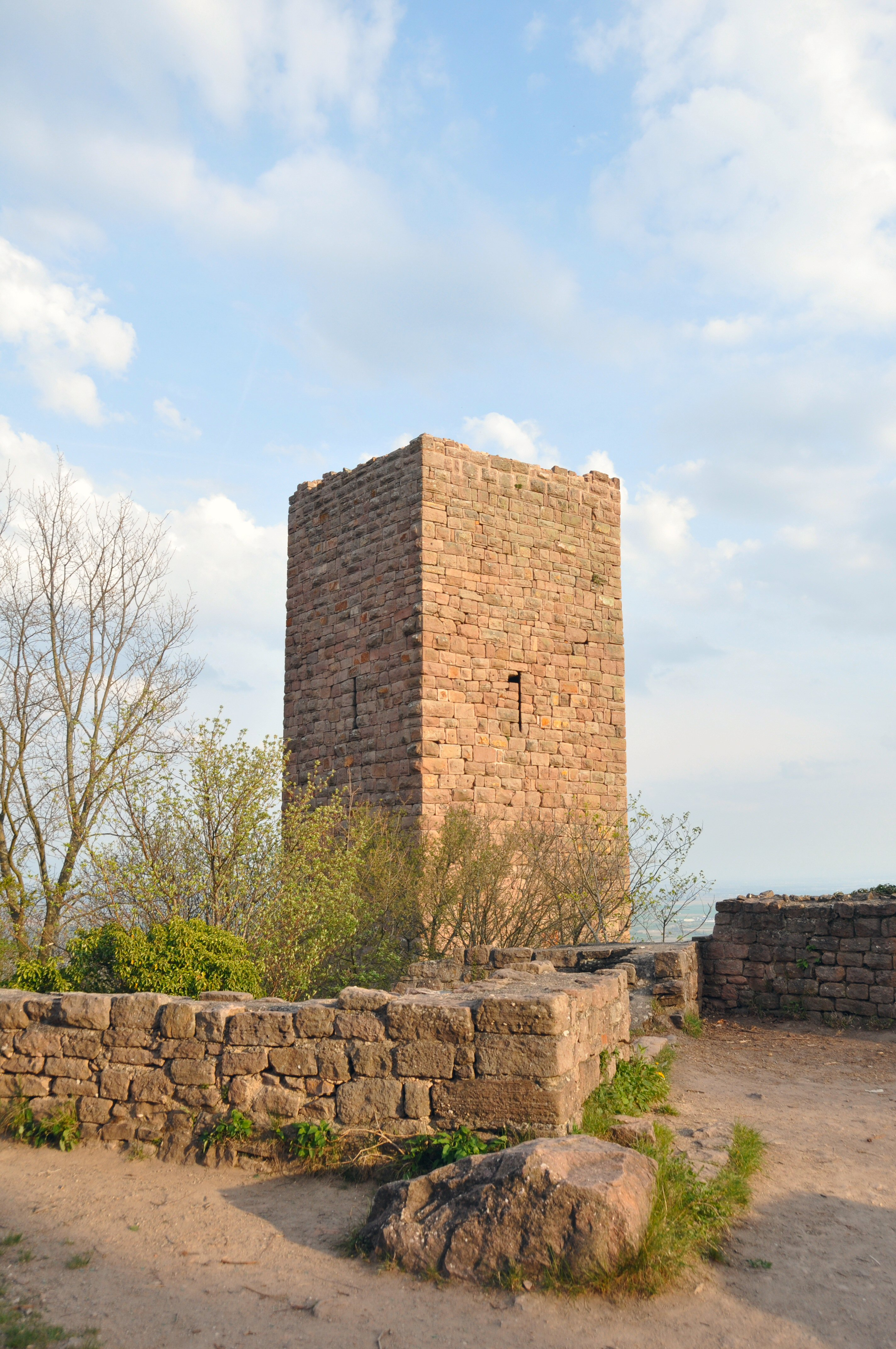
Château de Weckmund
