= Roman aqueduct of Vieu =

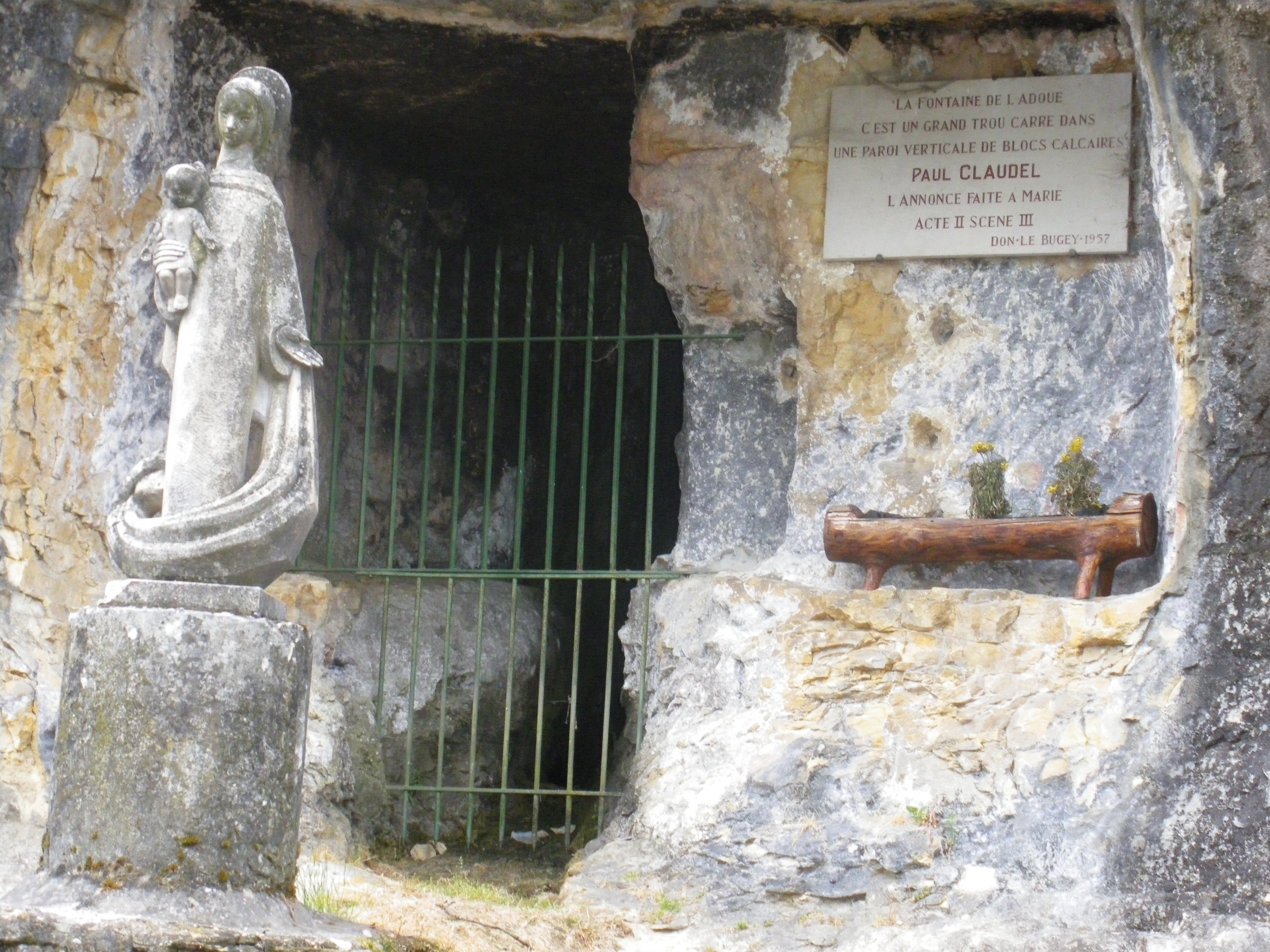
The Adoue fountain, at the end of the Roman aqueduct of Vieu

The Roman aqueduct of Vieu (French: Aqueduct romain de Vieu) is a Roman underground aqueduct, which is located in Vieu in the French department of Ain in the Auvergne-Rhône-Alpes region.

It was classified as a historical monument by the list of 1840.

== Characteristics ==
A subterranean aqueduct, it stretches from Champagne-en-Valromey to the Adoue fountain in Vieu.

== History ==
The aqueduct has been the subject of historical studies since the seventeenth century. In 1820, Jean Anthelme Brillat-Savarin, who owned a property in Vieu-en-Valromey, also studied the aqueduct.

According to R. Chevallier, a member of Robert Bedon's team, the dating of the aqueduct is uncertain, but estimated to be as old as about 150 AD.
