= Château de Wahlenbourg =

Ruined castle in Haut-Rhin, Alsace, France

Coordinates: 48.0388°N 7.2732°E

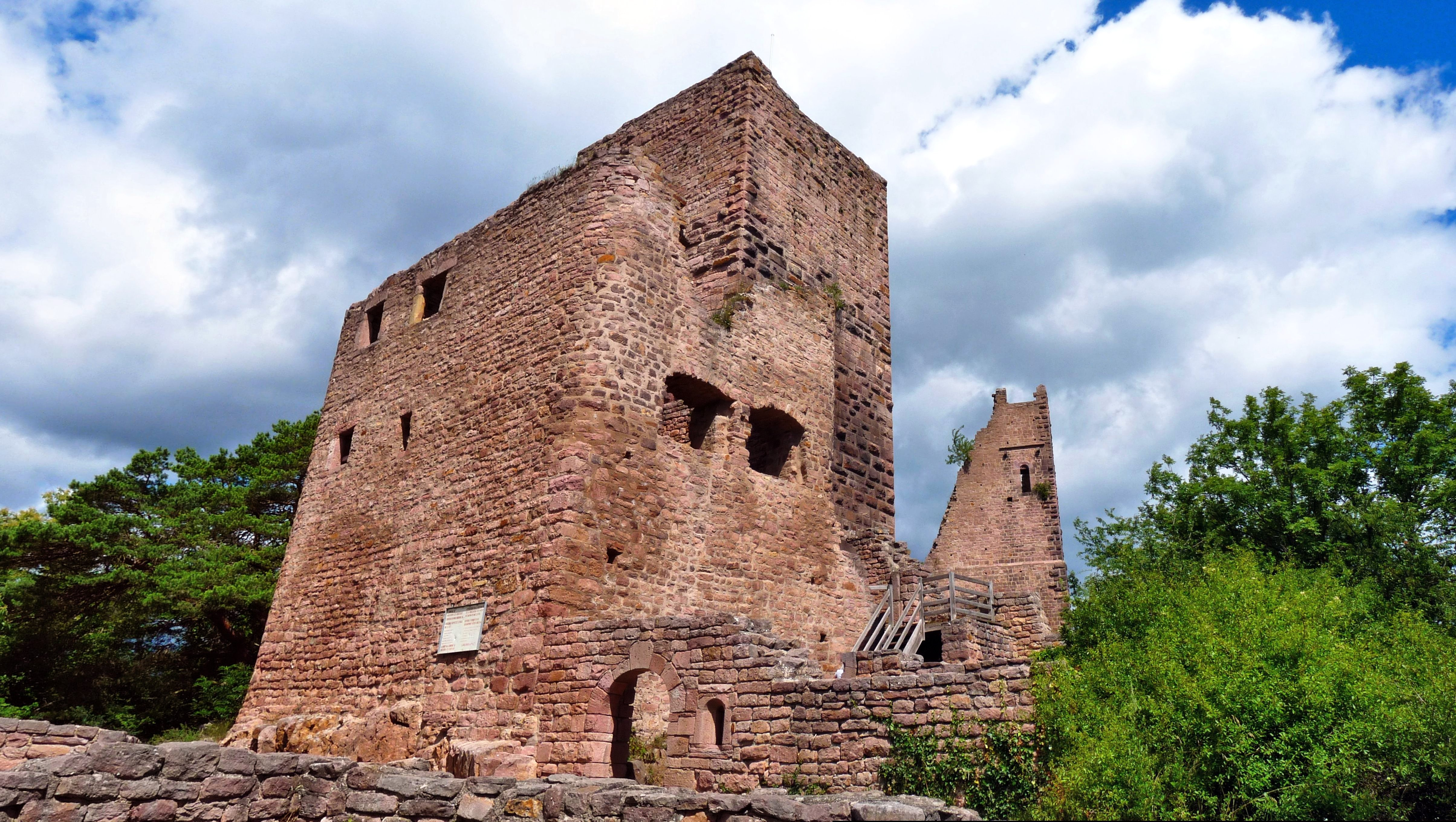
Ruins of Château de Wahlenbourg

Château de Wahlenbourg is a ruined castle in the commune of Husseren-les-Châteaux, in the department of Haut-Rhin, Alsace, France. It is a listed historical monument since 1840.
