= Château de Bricquebec =

Castle in Manche, Normandy, France

Coordinates: 49°28′14″N 1°37′57″W

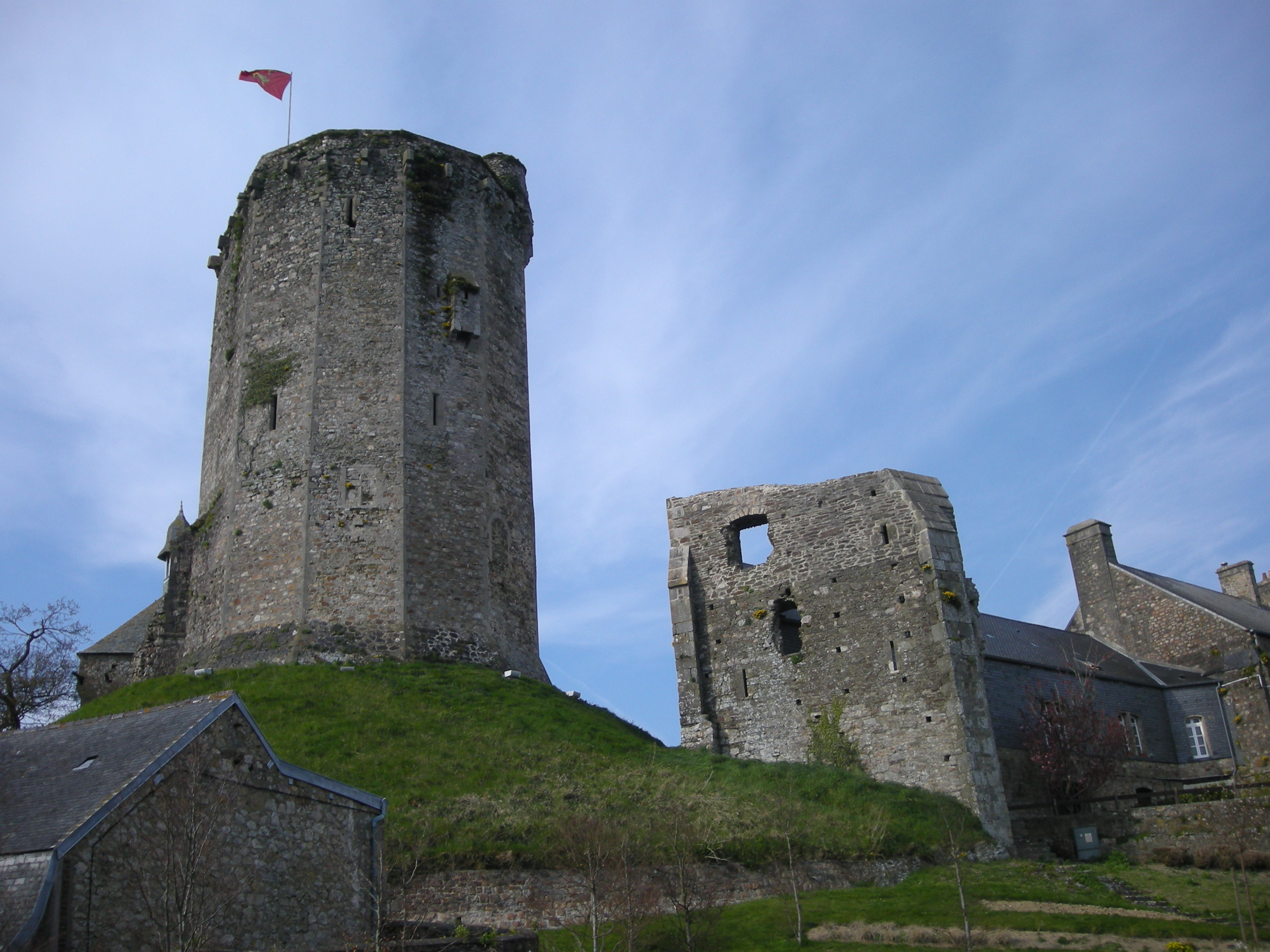
The keep of Bricquebec

The Château de Bricquebec (French pronunciation: [ʃato də bʁikbɛk]) is a castle in the Manche département of France.

The castle is listed as a Monument historique since 1840 by the French Ministry of Culture.

== See also ==
- List of castles in France
