= Château de Dagsbourg =

Ruined castle in Grand Est, France

Coordinates: 48.0386°N 7.2728°E

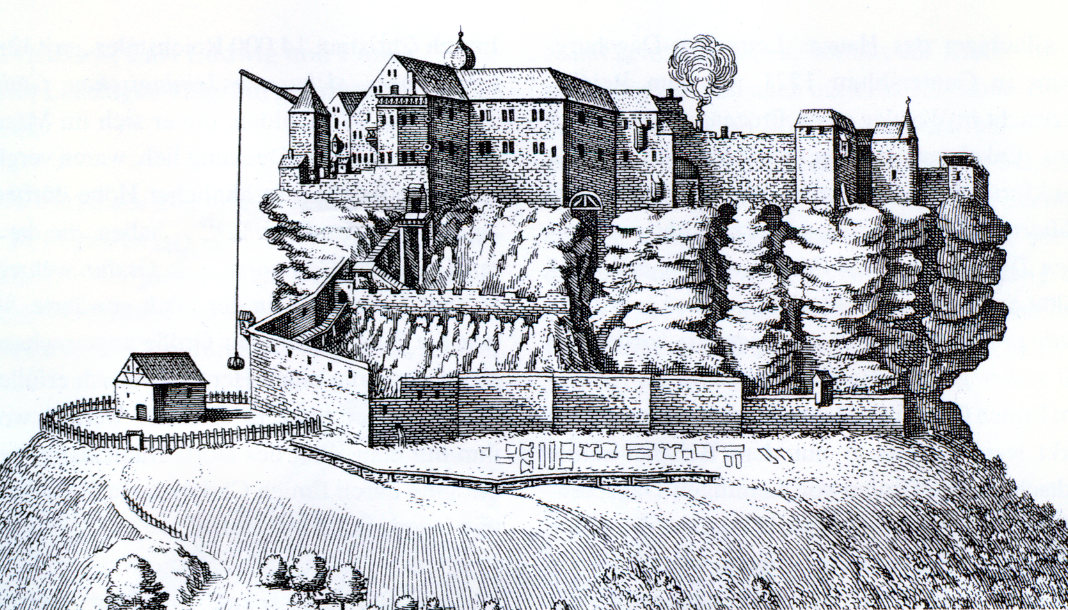
Castle Dagsburg (1663)

Château de Dagsbourg (German: Dagsburg) is a ruined castle in the commune of Eguisheim, in the department of Haut-Rhin, Alsace, France. It has been a listed historical monument since 1840.
