= Valle-di-Campoloro =

- Commune
- Location of Valle-di-Campoloro
- Location within France Location within Corsica
- Coordinates: 42°20′12″N 9°29′41″E
- Country: France
- Region: Corsica
- Department: Haute-Corse
- Arrondissement: Corte
- Canton: Castagniccia
- Intercommunality: Costa Verde

Government
  - Mayor (2020–2026): Simon-Pierre Riolacci
- Area^{1}: 5.6 km^{2} (2.2 sq mi)
- Elevation: 250 m (820 ft)
- Highest elevation: 976 m (3,202 ft)
- Lowest elevation: 0 m (0 ft)
- Population (2023): 336
  - Density: 60/km^{2} (160/sq mi)
- Time zone: UTC+01:00 (CET)
  - Summer (DST): UTC+02:00 (CEST)
- INSEE/Postal code: 2B335 /20221
- ^{1} French Land Register data, which excludes lakes, ponds, glaciers > 1 km^{2} (0.386 sq mi or 247 acres) and river estuaries.

Valle-di-Campoloro or Valle di Campoloru, is a commune in the Haute-Corse department of France on the island of Corsica.

== Population ==
Historical population
Year	Pop.	±% p.a.
1968	146	—
1975	163	+1.59%
1982	174	+0.94%
1990	253	+4.79%
1999	263	+0.43%
2007	287	+1.10%
2012	345	+3.75%
2017	344	−0.06%
2023	336	−0.39%
Source: INSEE

== Monuments ==
- Église Sainte-Christine de Valle-di-Campoloro

== See also ==
- Communes of the Haute-Corse department
