= Bérulle =

Commune in Grand Est, France

- Commune
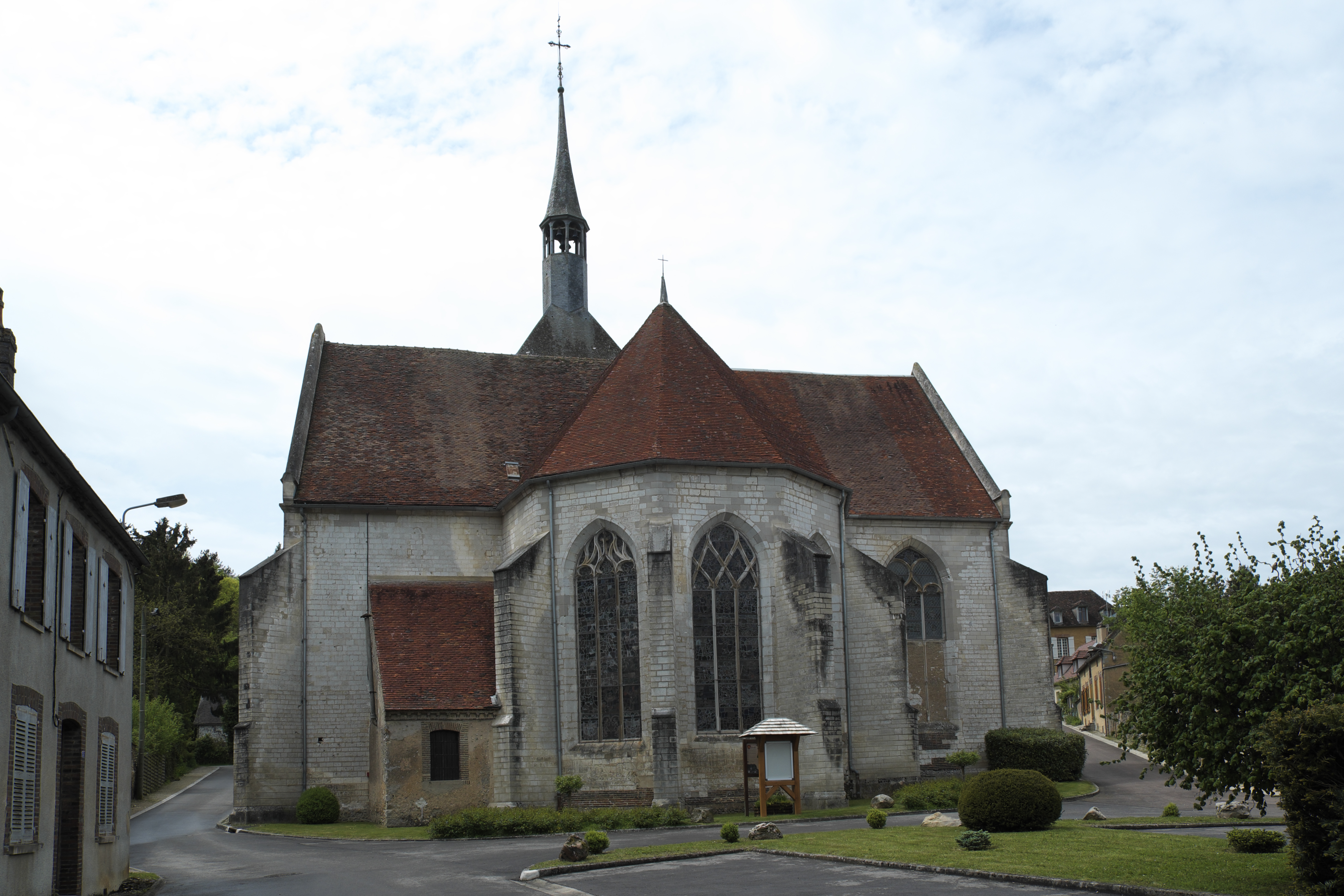
- The church in Bérulle

- Coat of arms
- Location of Bérulle
- Location within France Location within Grand Est
- Coordinates: 48°10′42″N 3°39′53″E
- Country: France
- Region: Grand Est
- Department: Aube
- Arrondissement: Troyes
- Canton: Aix-Villemaur-Pâlis

Government
  - Mayor (2020–2026): Gilles Plouviez
- Area^{1}: 16.5 km^{2} (6.4 sq mi)
- Elevation: 160 m (520 ft)
- Highest elevation: 245 m (804 ft)
- Lowest elevation: 134 m (440 ft)
- Population (2023): 193
  - Density: 11.7/km^{2} (30.3/sq mi)
- Time zone: UTC+01:00 (CET)
  - Summer (DST): UTC+02:00 (CEST)
- INSEE/Postal code: 10042 /10160
- ^{1} French Land Register data, which excludes lakes, ponds, glaciers > 1 km^{2} (0.386 sq mi or 247 acres) and river estuaries.

Bérulle (French pronunciation: [beʁyl]) is a commune in the Aube department in north-central France.

== History ==
Berulle's history dates back to the 12th century when it was a part of a small chastelleny under the county of Champagne. Over time, Berulle's ownership changed hands several times, including being held by Blanche d'Artois in the 13th century, being reunited with the Duchy of Nemours in the 16th century, and being sold to the Bérulle family in the 16th century.

The Bérulle family established the marquisate in the village of Séant, which eventually took on the name of Bérulle. During the 17th century, there were two fairs in Séant-sur-Othe and Berulle was dependent on the stewardship and generality of Paris.

In 1789, Berulle was a part of the election of Saint-Florentin and the bailiwick of Troyes. Berulle's history reflects its cultural heritage and its role as a hub of activity and commerce over the centuries.

During the French Revolution, Berulle was heavily impacted, with many of its historic buildings and monuments being destroyed. Despite these losses, the town's history and cultural heritage have been preserved through the preservation of its remaining historic structures and the establishment of museums and art galleries.

== Monuments ==
=== Church of the Nativity of the Virgin ===
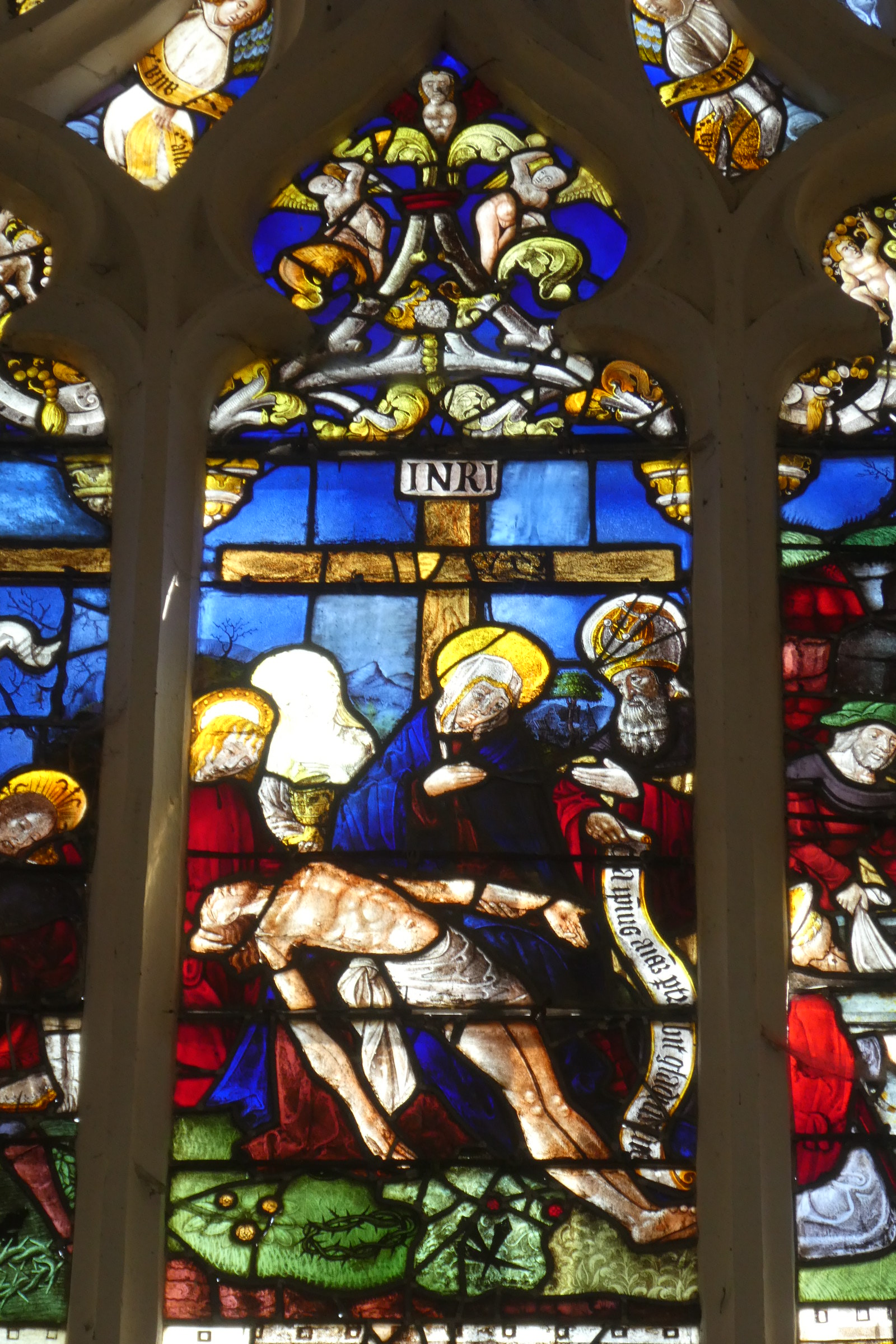
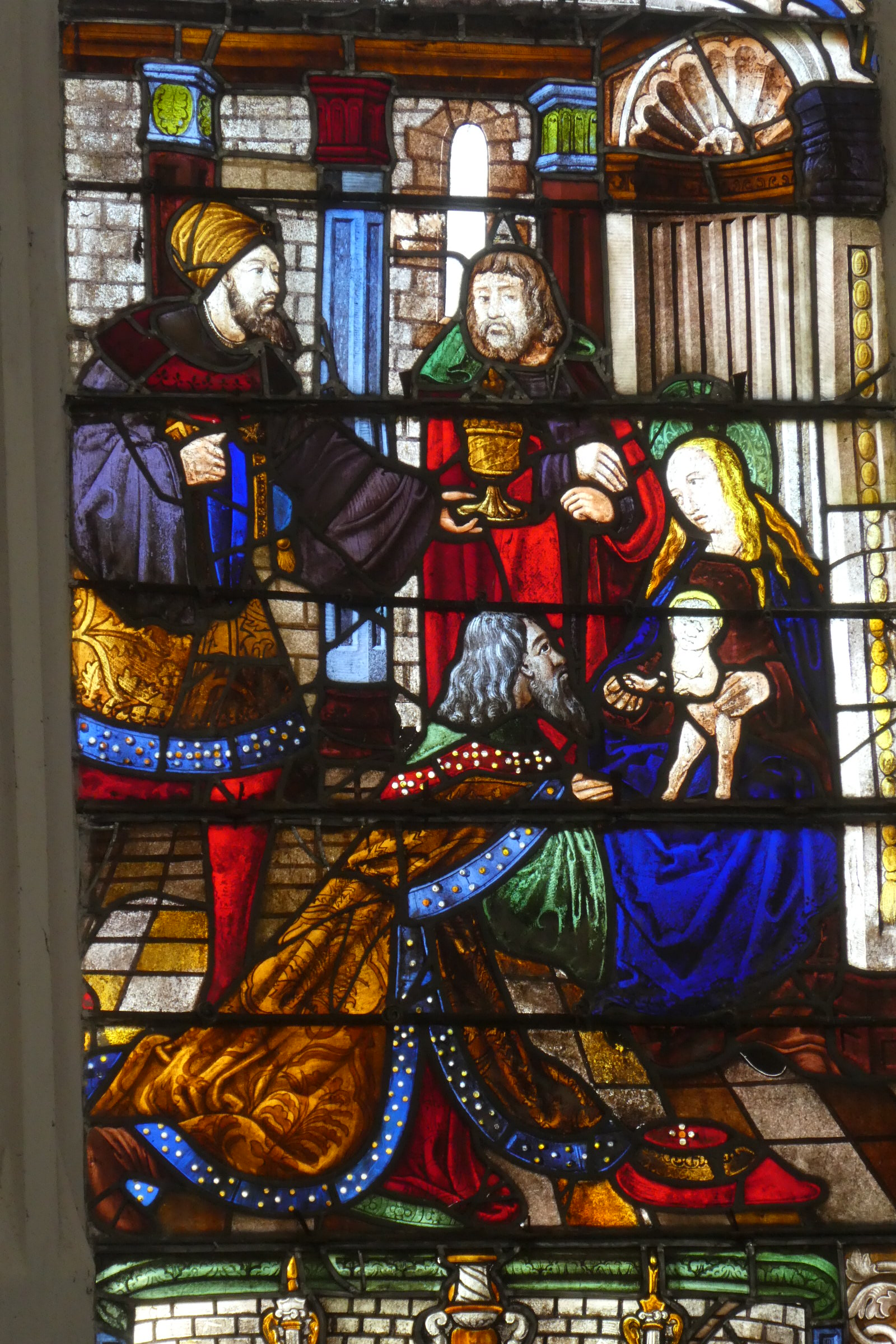
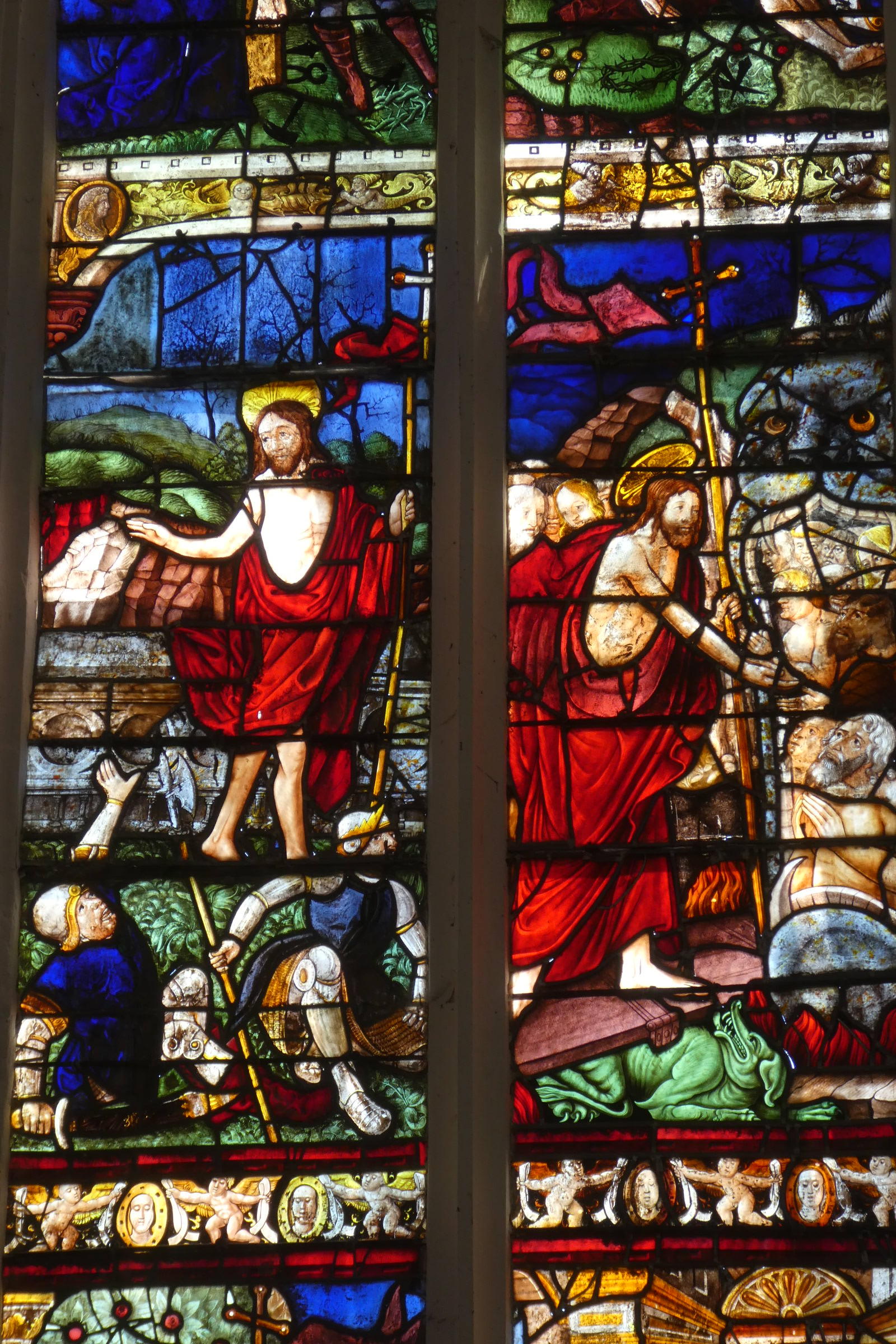
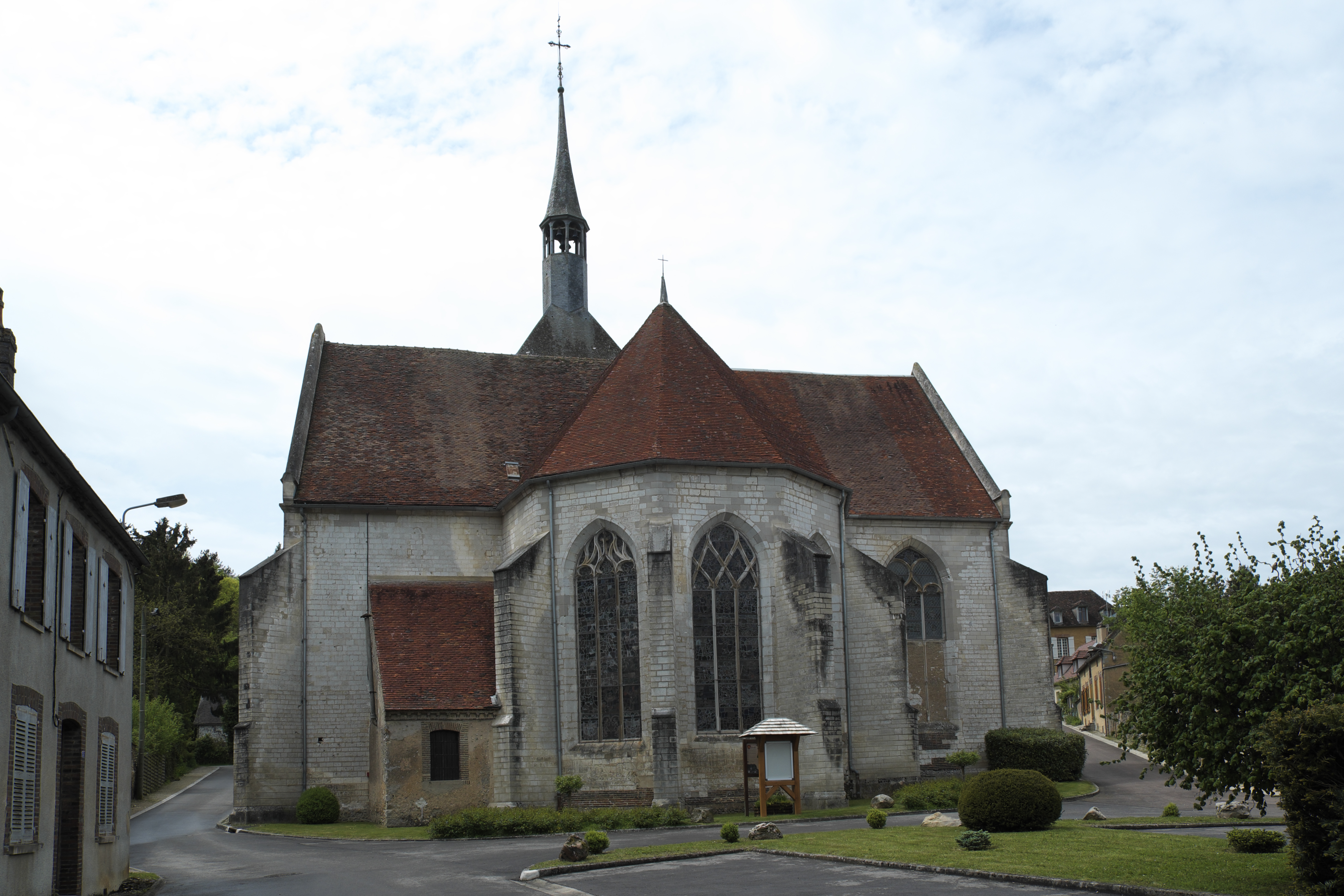
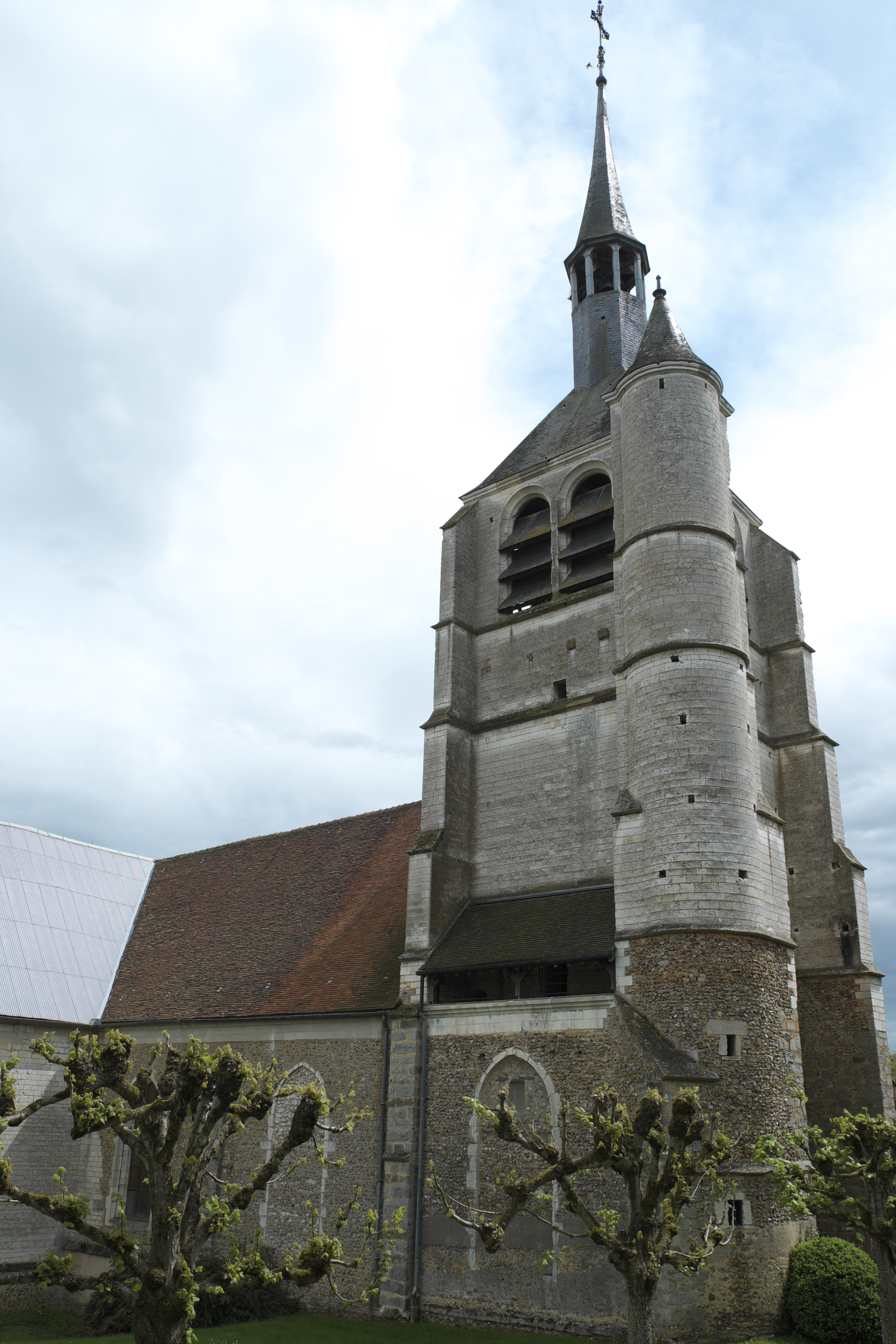
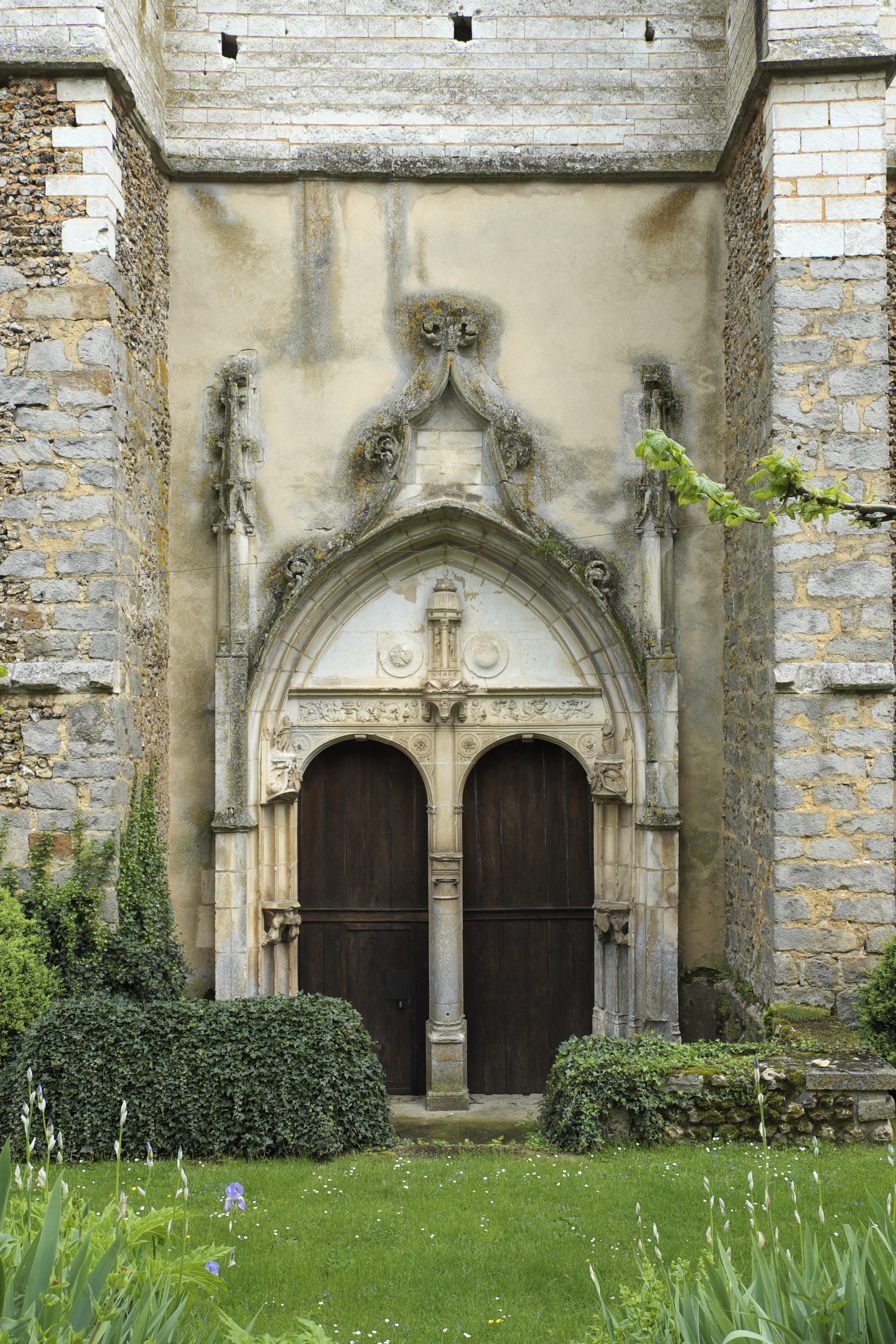
Outside and inside of the Church

The Church of Our Lady of the Nativity, French: Église Notre-Dame-de-la-Nativité de Bérulle, is a 16th-century Catholic church located in the commune of Bérulle, Aube, France. It was raised from 1510 to 1515 and was classified as a Historic Monument in 1840. The church features 16th-century furniture such as statues of Christ on the cross, a Sebastian, a Madonna and Child, a baptismal font with decorations, and a 15th-century Education of Mary. It also has a 17th-century tympanum on its portal, an 18th-century wrought iron choir fence, and classified 16th-century windows with deep blues and reds.

== Population ==
Historical population
Year	Pop.	±% p.a.
1968	278	—
1975	249	−1.56%
1982	240	−0.52%
1990	220	−1.08%
1999	235	+0.74%
2007	240	+0.26%
2012	259	+1.54%
2017	234	−2.01%
2023	193	−3.16%
Source: INSEE

== See also ==
- Communes of the Aube department
