= Saint-André-de-Bâgé =

Commune in Auvergne-Rhône-Alpes, France

- Commune
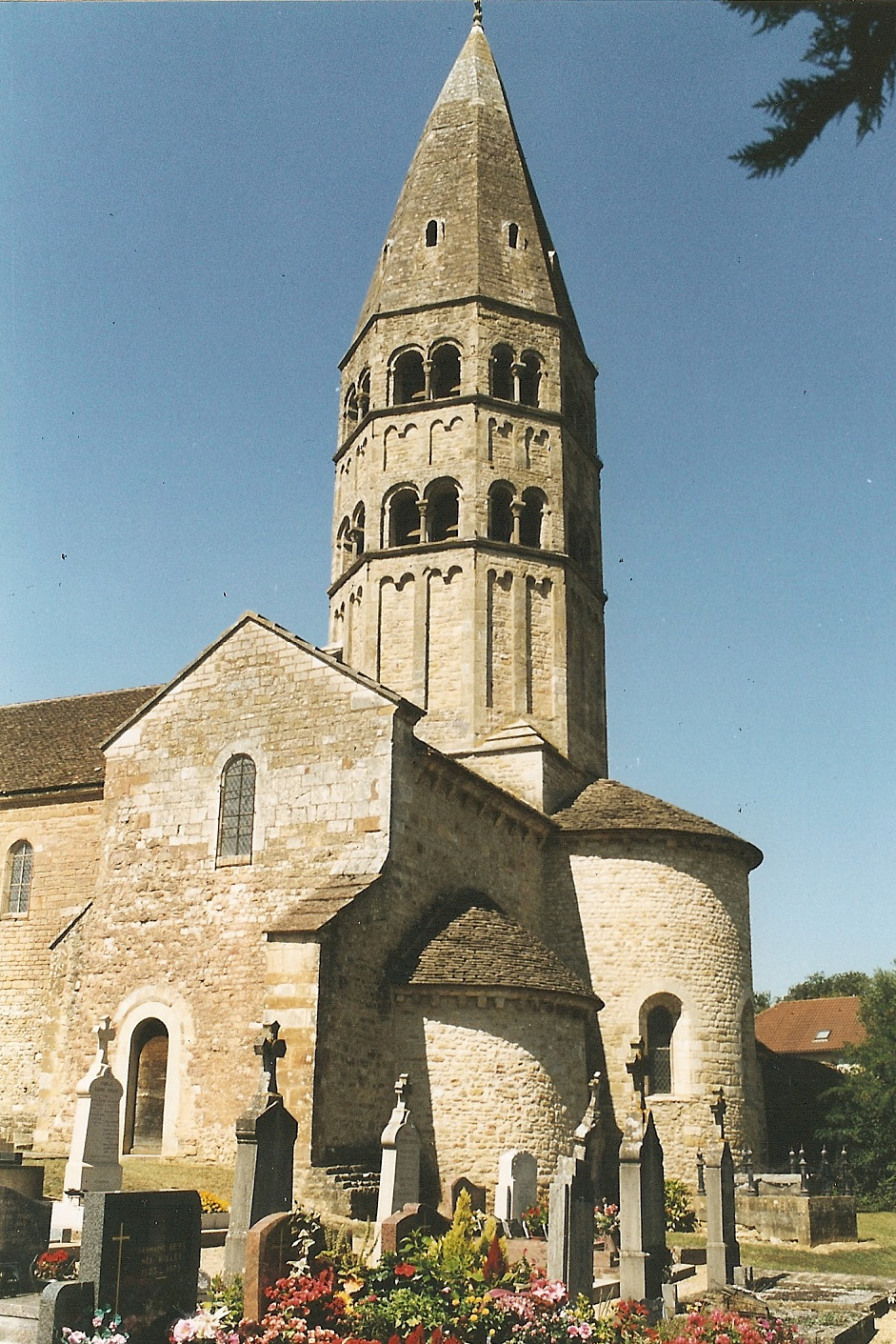
- Church of Saint-André
- Location of Saint-André-de-Bâgé
- Location within France Location within Auvergne-Rhône-Alpes
- Coordinates: 46°18′00″N 4°55′00″E
- Country: France
- Region: Auvergne-Rhône-Alpes
- Department: Ain
- Arrondissement: Bourg-en-Bresse
- Canton: Replonges

Government
  - Mayor (2026–32): Philippe Plenard
- Area^{1}: 2.7 km^{2} (1.0 sq mi)
- Elevation: 188 m (617 ft)
- Highest elevation: 212 m (696 ft)
- Lowest elevation: 183 m (600 ft)
- Population (2023): 841
  - Density: 310/km^{2} (810/sq mi)
- Time zone: UTC+01:00 (CET)
  - Summer (DST): UTC+02:00 (CEST)
- INSEE/Postal code: 01332 /01380
- ^{1} French Land Register data, which excludes lakes, ponds, glaciers > 1 km^{2} (0.386 sq mi or 247 acres) and river estuaries.

Saint-André-de-Bâgé (French pronunciation: [sɛ̃.t‿ɑ̃dʁe də baʒe]) is a commune in the Ain department in eastern France.

== Population ==
Historical population
Year	Pop.	±% p.a.
1968	163	—
1975	257	+6.72%
1982	391	+6.18%
1990	437	+1.40%
1999	507	+1.66%
2007	551	+1.05%
2012	684	+4.42%
2017	751	+1.89%
2023	841	+1.90%
Source: INSEE (1968-2023)

== See also ==
- Communes of the Ain department
