= Barbaggio =

Barbaggio Barbaghju
- Commune
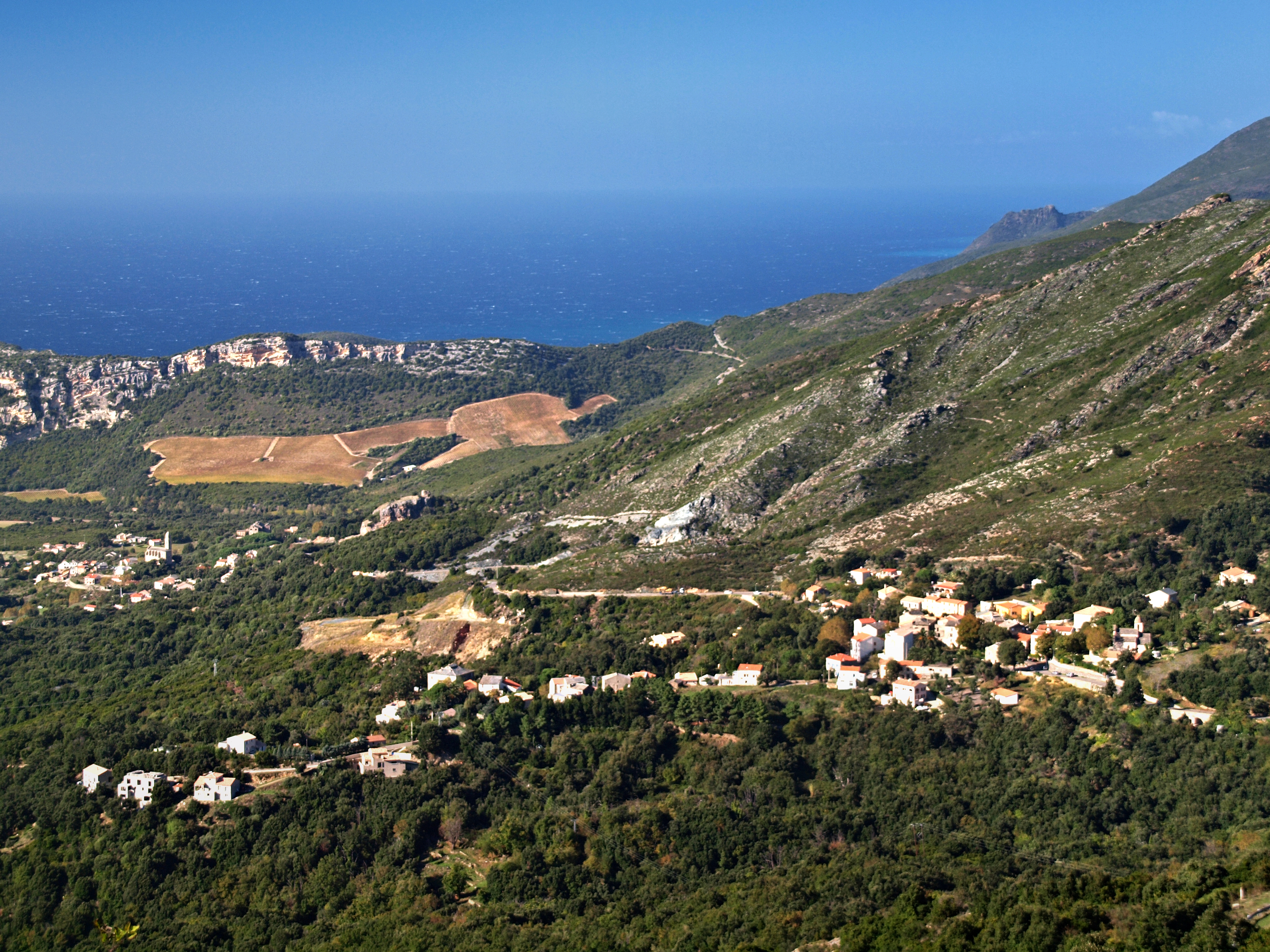
- A general view of the village, with Patrimonio at the bottom left
- Location of Barbaggio
- Location within France Location within Corsica
- Coordinates: 42°41′05″N 9°22′25″E
- Country: France
- Region: Corsica
- Department: Haute-Corse
- Arrondissement: Calvi
- Canton: Biguglia-Nebbio

Government
  - Mayor (2020–2026): Étienne Marchetti
- Area^{1}: 10.86 km^{2} (4.19 sq mi)
- Elevation: 300 m (980 ft)
- Highest elevation: 940 m (3,080 ft)
- Lowest elevation: 7 m (23 ft)
- Population (2023): 362
  - Density: 33.3/km^{2} (86.3/sq mi)
- Time zone: UTC+01:00 (CET)
  - Summer (DST): UTC+02:00 (CEST)
- INSEE/Postal code: 2B029 /20253
- ^{1} French Land Register data, which excludes lakes, ponds, glaciers > 1 km^{2} (0.386 sq mi or 247 acres) and river estuaries.

Barbaggio (Italian pronunciation: [barˈbadd͡ʒo]; French: [baʁbaʒjo]; Corsican: Barbaghju) is a commune in the French department of Haute-Corse on the island of Corsica. It is known for its wine, its scenery, and the prehistoric site of Strette.

== Geography ==
Barbaggio is located on an inland plateau below Cap Corse on the southwest slopes of the 960 metres (3,150 ft) high Serra di Pigno some 8 km east of Saint-Florent and 5 km south-east of Patrimonio. In times of conflict it controls the Col de Teghime, a 536-metre (1,759 ft) high pass through the Serra mountains leading to Bastia, 10 kilometres (6 mi) to the north-east. Barbaggio has a fine view of the Golfe de St-Florent but does not itself border the sea. Traditionally an area belonging to the Nebbio region, which has been called since Antiquity Conca d'Oro. Barbaggio is one of 14 communes that make up the current Canton of Biguglia-Nebbio.

=== Relief ===
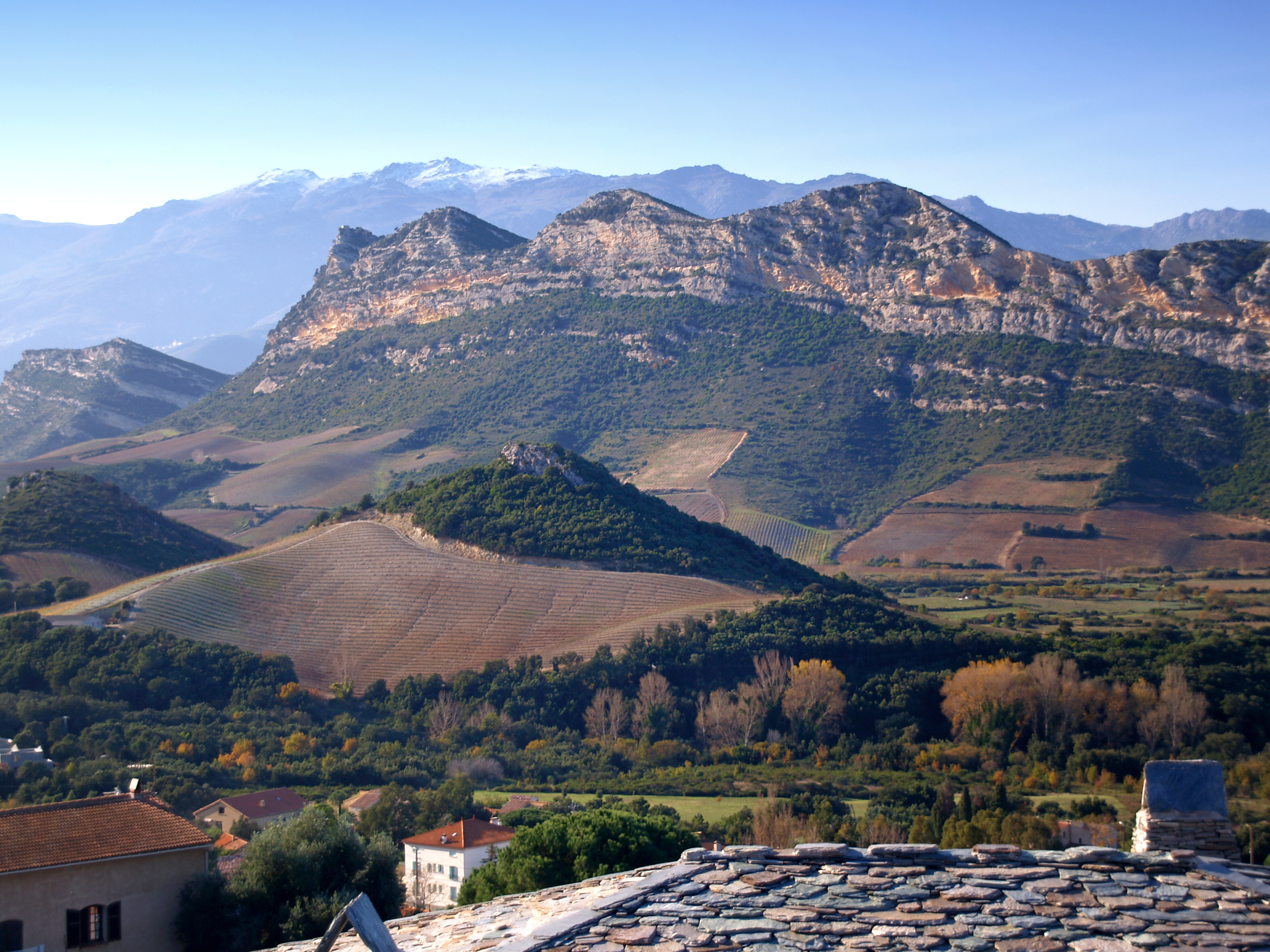
The hills of Monte Sant'Angelo

Barbaggio backs onto the western slope of the mountains of the Serra di Pigno, the extension of the dorsal schist of Cap Corse. It covers the plain to the south-west of the village. The eastern side is delineated by the valley of the Ruisseau de Lucitello stream with the village built on a rocky ridge under the Pigno (958 m).

Its boundaries are defined as follows:

- to the north: by a boundary starting from the bridge of the D81 at the entrance to Saint-Florent and following the course of the Ruisseau de La Trutta through a chasm in the limestone hills of Monte Sant'Angelo (Poggio-d'Oletta), then the course of the Ruisseau de Vaccareccia stream before following a ridgeline passing through Cima Malaspina (537 m) to the south of Pigno (958 m) on which there are identifiable telecommunications towers;
- to the east: along a ridgeline passing through Cima Orcaio (788 m) along the D81 at the height of a disused quarry located approximately 700 m east of the Col de Teghime, then passing through the junction of the D81 and the D338, through Monte Canarinco and Monte Fesso (358 m) to the south of the Pnte Fesso quarry at the southern boundary of the commune;
- to the south: along the ridgeline through Monti Rossi (674 m), crossing the D38 road south of an old quarry before dropping rapidly towards the plain to join the Monte Sant'Angelo limestone hills 300 m to north of the mountain;
- to the west: the boundaries are indicated by the ridgeline of the Monte Sant'Angelo limestone hills until the D81 bridge.

Barbaggio does not border the sea - the bridge on the D81 is located approximately 700 m from the sea.

The plateau is drained by small streams such as the Ruisseau de Lucitello and provides the commune with its chief economic resource: 45 hectares (110 acres) of grapevines. The commune is known for its fine wine. Of the 1,086 ha (2,680 acres) remainder, 610 ha (1,500 acres) are woods. Barbaggio shares a nature reserve of 32 ha (79 acres) with nearby Oletta.

=== Hydrography ===
Barbaggio is located in the drainage basin of the Ruiseau de la Trutta which flows west to Olzu in the Gulf of Saint-Florent. Upstream it is called the Ruisseau de Vaccareccia. It rises from the Cima di Malaspina at 470 m above sea level. It is fed by the Ruisseau de Natio Creek (upstream called Ruisseau de Lucitello) and its tributary the Ruisseau de Forci.

=== Climate and vegetation ===
As for other communes in the Nebbio region and those along the western coast of Cap Corse, Barbaggio enjoys a Mediterranean climate with moderate temperature changes. The snow only reaches the heights of Pigno a few days a year, rarely dropping below 400 metres. Snowfall disrupts traffic in the Col de Teghime (536 m above sea level) only rarely.

Rainfall that should refresh the Serra di Pigno is low in summer and so the flanks of the mountain are arid, sunny, and exposed, being the sulana (or sunny-side) of the mountain and subject to frequent libeccio - the prevailing westerly wind: dry, violent, and often mixed with the punente, the other westerly wind. Because of its geographical position and its area of plain, Barbaggio is relatively well protected from the north winds - the Tramuntana in winter: a healthy, dry, violent and icy wind; and the wet winter north-Easter which brings cold and snow from Italy.

The vegetative cover in uncultivated areas has different landscapes at different levels. Near the ridges vegetation is low moorish carved by strong winds with rocky grasslands. On lower levels it is dense maquis shrubland consisting of many thorny shrubs (Thorny broom and Corsican broom) as well as brambles, Pouzin rosebushes (Rosa pouzinii), and Sarsaparille which are often impenetrable and without trees due to frequent fires. At the level of the village there are olive trees, holly oaks, and even some chestnuts. Around the village are palm trees, mimosas, prickly pears, and agaves which bring an exotic touch.

The cultivated areas are located on the plain. They are mostly vines producing wines and muscat under an AOC. In peak summer season they have a supply of water from Lake Padula .

=== Communication and transport ===
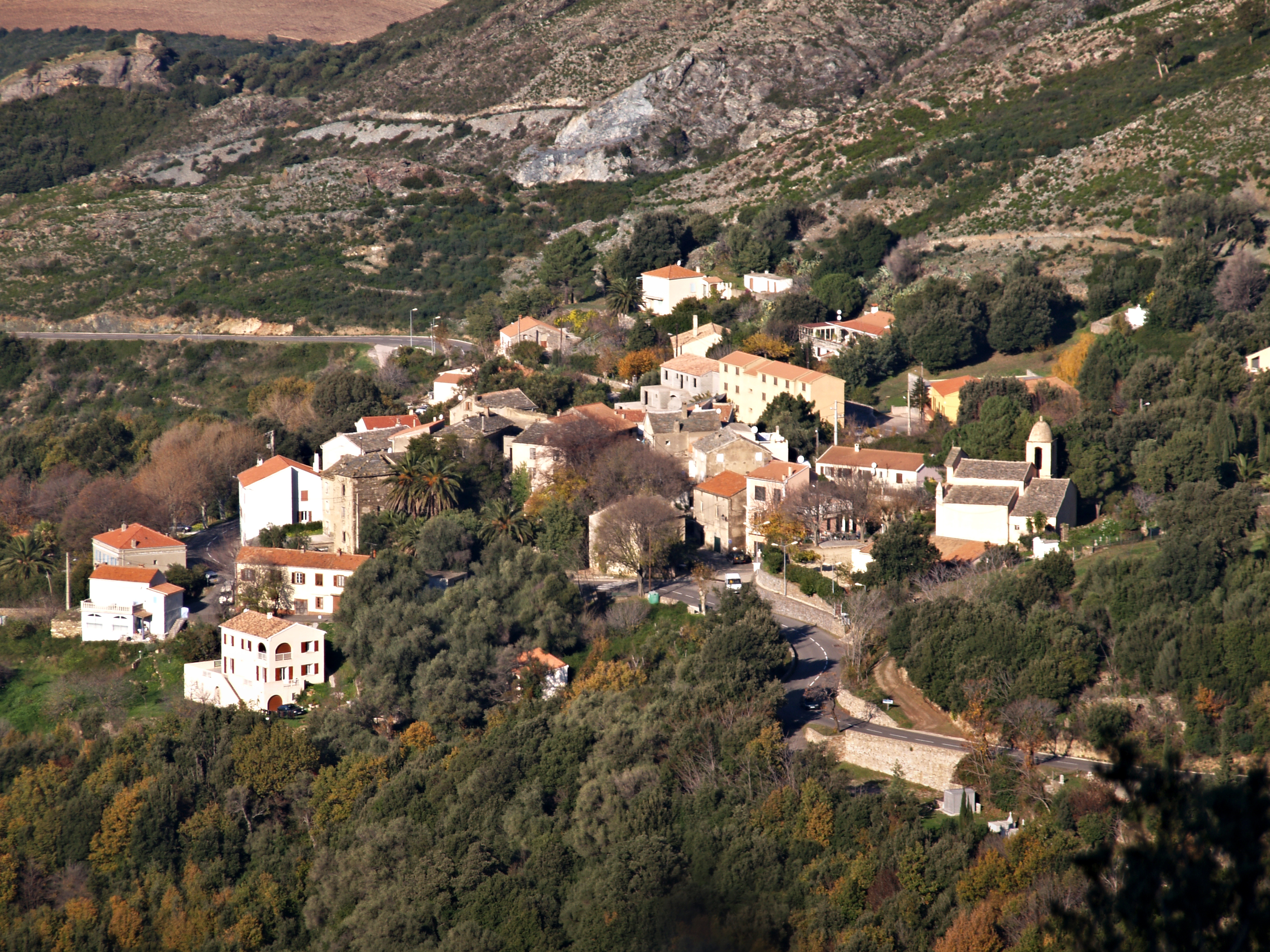
The Hamlet of Piazze

=== Road access ===
The D81 road from Bastia to Saint-Florent passes through the commune and crosses the Col de Teghime (536 m). Descending from the pass, Barbaggio is the first of the two villages that are located on the route.

The Col de Teghime in the south of the commune is the junction of the D81 and the D38 which goes south-west to Poggio-d'Oletta.

The D338 road leads to the top of Pigno, south-east of the commune, where there are telecommunication towers. Its junction with the D81 is nearly 700 m east of the Col de Teghime. It ends in a cul-de-sac in remote Pigno with the telecommunications facilities at 4.1 km.

== Town planning ==
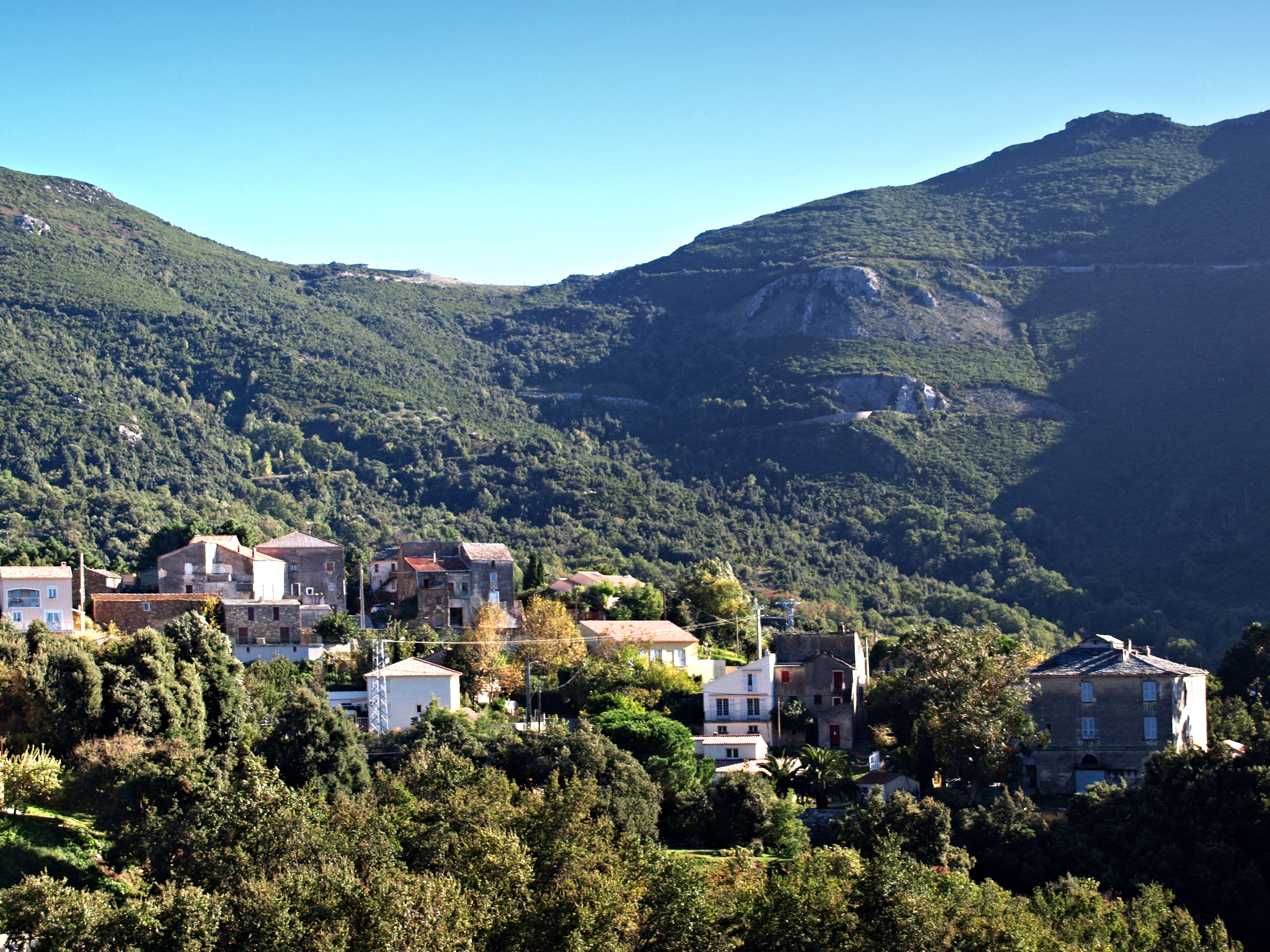
The Hamlet of Poggio

The village of Barbaggio is built on a rocky ridge under the Pigno (958 m). There are three other hamlets in the commune:

- Piazze in the centre where there are the town hall, church, war memorial, and the village square
- Poggio
- Gorgaccia slightly off to the west.

The plain is occupied by isolated farms.

The houses have austere facades without balconies and are 2 or 3 levels. Most are rendered and restored. Roofs alternate between slate and red tiles.

There is an orientation table at the village and at the Col de Teghime where the views are superb over the Gulf of Saint-Florent, the mountains of Nebbio, and the sunny limestone slopes covered with vineyards. At Pigno the view is spectacular: on one side is the Tyrrhenian Sea and the islands of the Tuscan archipelago, and on the other is the Gulf of Saint-Florent, the Agriates, and almost all of Nebbio.

== History ==
=== Prehistory ===
The rivulets that drain the plateau beneath Barbaggio and nearby Patrimonio gather into a single stream, the Ruisseau la Strutta or Rivière de la Strutta which, flowing between 200-metre (660 ft) cliffs, crosses a short alluvial plain and empties into the Gulf of Saint Florent. Route D81 leaving Saint-Florent bears north-east along the alluvium and turns inland through the gorge. Just over the Barbaggio border at the base of a cliff is the prehistoric Abri de Strette meaning "Strette Shelter" where strette means "narrow place". It is one of the oldest continuously occupied sites in Corsica.

The material of the bottom layer has been carbon-dated to 9140±300 BP or about 7000 BC which is well into the Pre-Neolithic period. It contains shell middens and the bones of small animals, such as Sardinian pika, believed to be extinct, as well as a lithic assemblage. Chemical analysis of the stones identifies them as non-Corsican. This level is believed to have been a seasonal hunter-gatherer site of non-Corsicans arriving by boat.

The Early Neolithic period, starting about 6000 BC, is identified by shards of Cardium pottery. Subsequent layers indicate a continuous occupation until the end of the Bronze Age; i.e., this was an indigenous village commanding the route to the plateau and the pass. It was abandoned at the start of the Iron Age but was sporadically occupied afterwards.

In 1965 a Statue menhir in perfect condition was discovered near a place called Foata on the plain of Barbaggio. It was named U Nativu.

In 1985 the area where U Nativu had been discovered was converted into a sports field. An urgent rescue excavation was carried out by J-G. Ottaviani and J. Magdeleine. The seven trenches dug led to the discovery of three blocks of Miocene limestone (the rock from which U Nativu was cut) proving the likelihood that several stones were cut in very ancient times.

Since then the U Nativu has been displayed at Patrimonio and is now called "de Patrimonio".

=== Middle Ages ===
In the Middle Ages Barbaggio, then Barbaio − belonged to the Diocese of Nebbio, (From the Latin Nebulensis meaning "cloudy"), which consisted of a section of north-west Corsica and the south-west coast of Cap Corse. These facts are attested by the Cartulary of Nebbio, a fragment of a 13th-century collection of documents published by the bishops of Nebbio concerning the notarization of land titles from the 10th to the 13th centuries AD. One of the notaries was Johannes de S. Martino de Barbaio, a priest. The language of the document shows that the Corsican language had already evolved from Latin.

=== Modern times ===
In the 16th century the Pieve of Patrimonio was made up of inhabited places called: lo Palazzo, la Ficagia, la Picinasca, lo Cardeto, lo Calvello, la Feruciasca, Barbagio, Brigheta, and Casatico. Around 1550 the Pieve had about 550 inhabitants.

At the time of the Great Revolt of the Corsicans against the Genoese (1729-1769) Antoine Dominic Monti, in his chronology of events, reported the following on the participation of the people of Barbaghju against the occupying Genovese:

- 1730: the people of Nebbio took the side of the Republic of Genoa against the Corsicans in revolt. The governor conceded 100 guns to the people of Nebbio including those of Barbaghju. (Note: All the proper names used are Genoveses proper names)
- April 1735: the Genovese blocked the road to the Nationaists who wanted to besiege the Capicorsu. They occupied Olmeta, Barbaghju, Ortale, and Lucciana but suffered a heavy defeat at Furiani.
- 8 July 1748: The French tried in vain to surprise Barbaghju.
- 1755:
  - 8 November: The Corsican government, having found the people of Nebbiu to be half-hearted to fight the Genovese, ordered the mobilisation of the people to arms to convene the next day at the convent of Muratu. The people of Oletta, Poghju and Barbaghju were excluded from this order who had valiantly resisted the harassment of the troops of Giovan Giacomo Grimaldi, Commissioner General, one of the most illustrious subjects of Genoa.
  - 18 November: At San Fiurenzu, Grimaldi tried to exit. He was repulsed while a detachment sent from Bastia by Doria was torn to pieces by the people of Barbaghju.
- 1768:
  - 29 July: Marbeuf wrote to Paoli to withdraw his troops from Barbaghju and Patrimoniu to let the French open communications between Bastia and San Fiurenzu and to give them the Isula Rossa. He left at night at Teghjime with 2000 men and gave the order to M. de Grandmaison to leave San Fiurenzu.
  - 1 August: After two days of hard fighting and heavy losses, the French took Patrimoniu and Barbaghju.
  - 29 August: The national government convened a consultation to discuss the situation resulting from the unexpected attack by the French against Barbaghju and Patrimoniu and the publication of the King's edict ordering a transfer of sovereignty.
- 1769:
  - 13–14 February: The Corsicans seize Barbaghju in the night where they were welcomed by the inhabitants and occupied Teghjime.
  - 15 February: Marbeuf hunted the Nationalists in Teghjime and encircled Barbaghju.
  - 16 February: The French retook Barbaghju.

In the 18th century, when Corsica was ceded to France by the Genovese, the Pieve took the name of Pieve d'Olmeta. At the French Revolution in 1789, the pievi became cantons. The piève for Barbaggio became the Canton of Saint-Florent.

=== Contemporary Era ===
==== Battle of the Col de Teghime ====
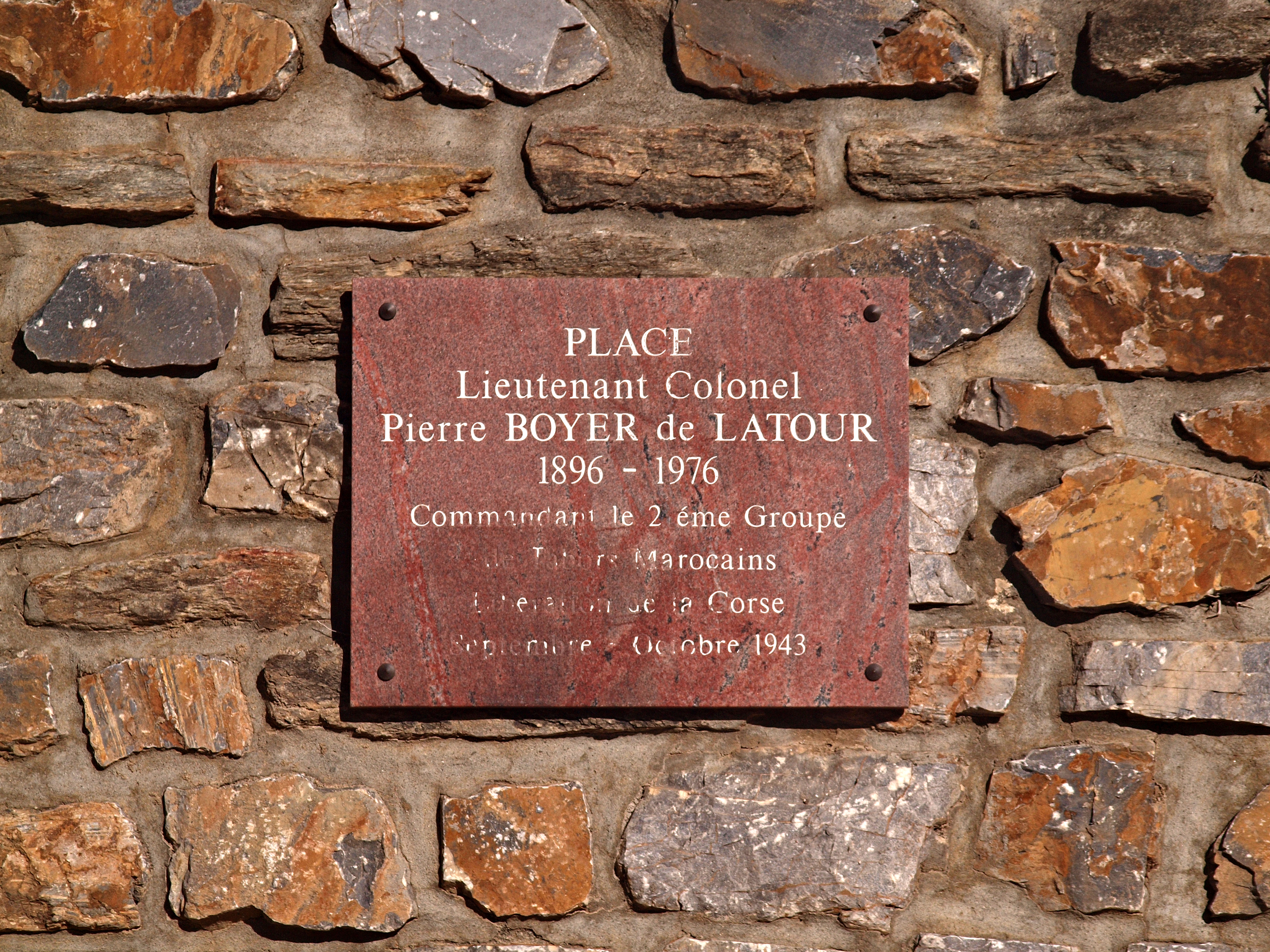
Memorial Plaque in the Barbaggio village square

On 3 October 1943 the Col de Teghime was the scene of a battle between the German forces defending the pass against the 2nd group of Moroccan tabors, who landed in the Gulf of Saint Florent commanded by Lieutenant-Colonel Pierre Boyer de Latour Moulin. The few German fortifications at this strategic point were removed at the cost of heavy fighting with knives.

To commemorate the feat of arms a monument was erected on the side of the D81 road and a gun (possibly of Russian origin) was placed there.

The town of Barbaggio honoured Pierre Boyer de Latour Moulin by giving his name to the village square.

==== Post-War ====
In 1954 the Canton of Saint-Florent was formed with the communes of Farinole, Patrimonio, Saint-Florent, and Barbaggio, which then had 104 inhabitants.

In 1971–1973, new cantons were created. The Canton of La Conca-d'Oro was created with the merger of the former cantons of Oletta and Saint-Florent.

== Administration ==
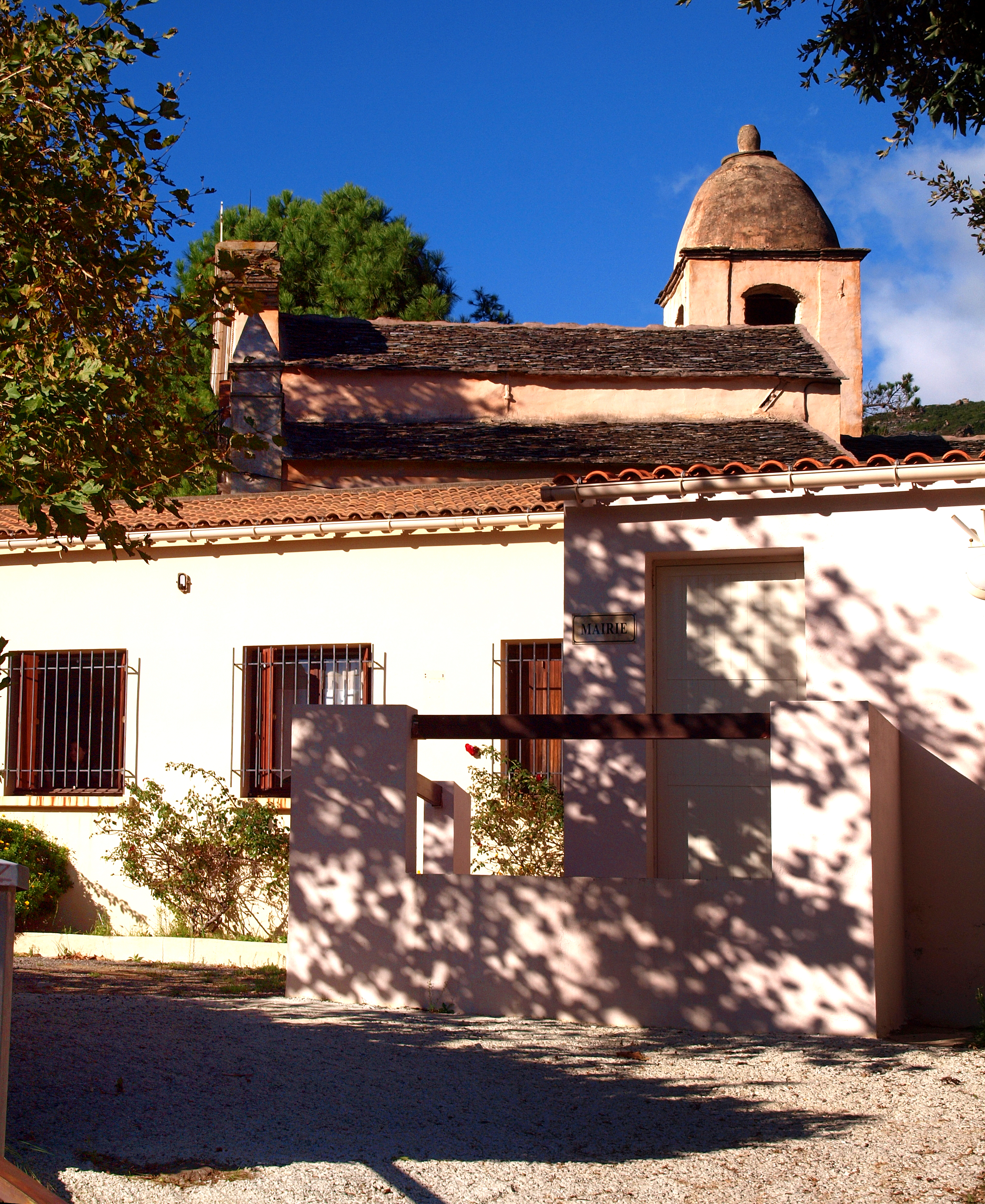
The Town Hall

List of Successive Mayors

From	To	Name
2001	2014	Olivier Mei
2014	2026	Étienne Marchetti

== Demography ==
Historical population

Year	Pop.	±% p.a.
1800	263	—
1821	262	−0.02%
1846	309	+0.66%
1872	300	−0.11%
1901	196	−1.46%
1926	127	−1.72%
1946	119	−0.32%
1962	77	−2.68%
1968	73	−0.89%

Year	Pop.	±% p.a.
1975	75	+0.39%
1982	78	+0.56%
1990	111	+4.51%
1999	164	+4.43%
2007	206	+2.89%
2012	243	+3.36%
2017	303	+4.51%
2023	362	+3.01%

Source: EHESS and INSEE

== Economy ==
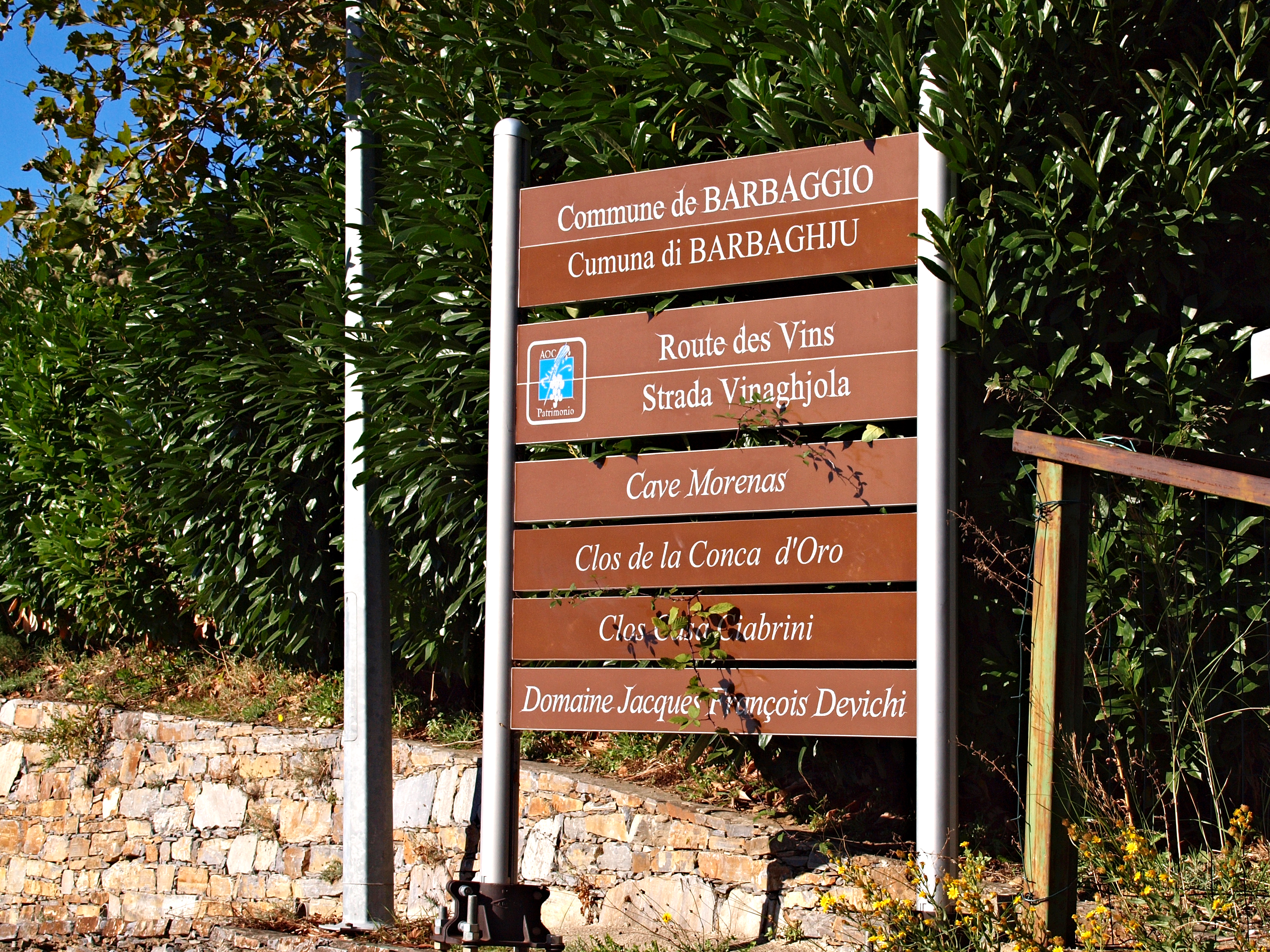
The AOC Patrimonio Wine Route

Viticulture is the chief industry of Barbaggio. Vines have been grown on terraced hillsides there and in most other villages of the wine-making region of Cap Corse since antiquity, possibly since prehistory. The wine industry of France in recent times is regulated by a governmental system of certification called the Appellation d'origine contrôlée (AOC), which specifies where and under what conditions the grapes for its labels can be grown. Barbaggio is certified to make the following labels:

- AOC Muscat du Cap Corse
- AOC Patrimonio
- AOC Vin de Corse

These are high-quality light table wines of minimal aging and short life made from grapes grown by several land-owners of the region.

Barbaggio is also the source stone blocks for the creation or strengthening of breakwaters, used in the port of Bastia and the Marina of Toga, and also for the construction of walls and parapets of all types. Two old open quarries are no longer used with those next to the D81 having been rehabilitated. The old quarry next to the D38 on the slopes of Monte Secco produced stone for masonry in irregular sizes but with a naturally smooth face of ochre/brown.

The quarry at Ponte Fesso, which produces very large metagabbros, (Note: A Gabbro that has undergone Metamorphism) may be extended to meet demand. The deposit consists of metagabbros in leptynite (Note: Fine-grained Metamorphic rock consisting of Quartz, alkaline feldspar, sometimes garnet but little mica or amphibole.) veins.

== Culture and heritage ==
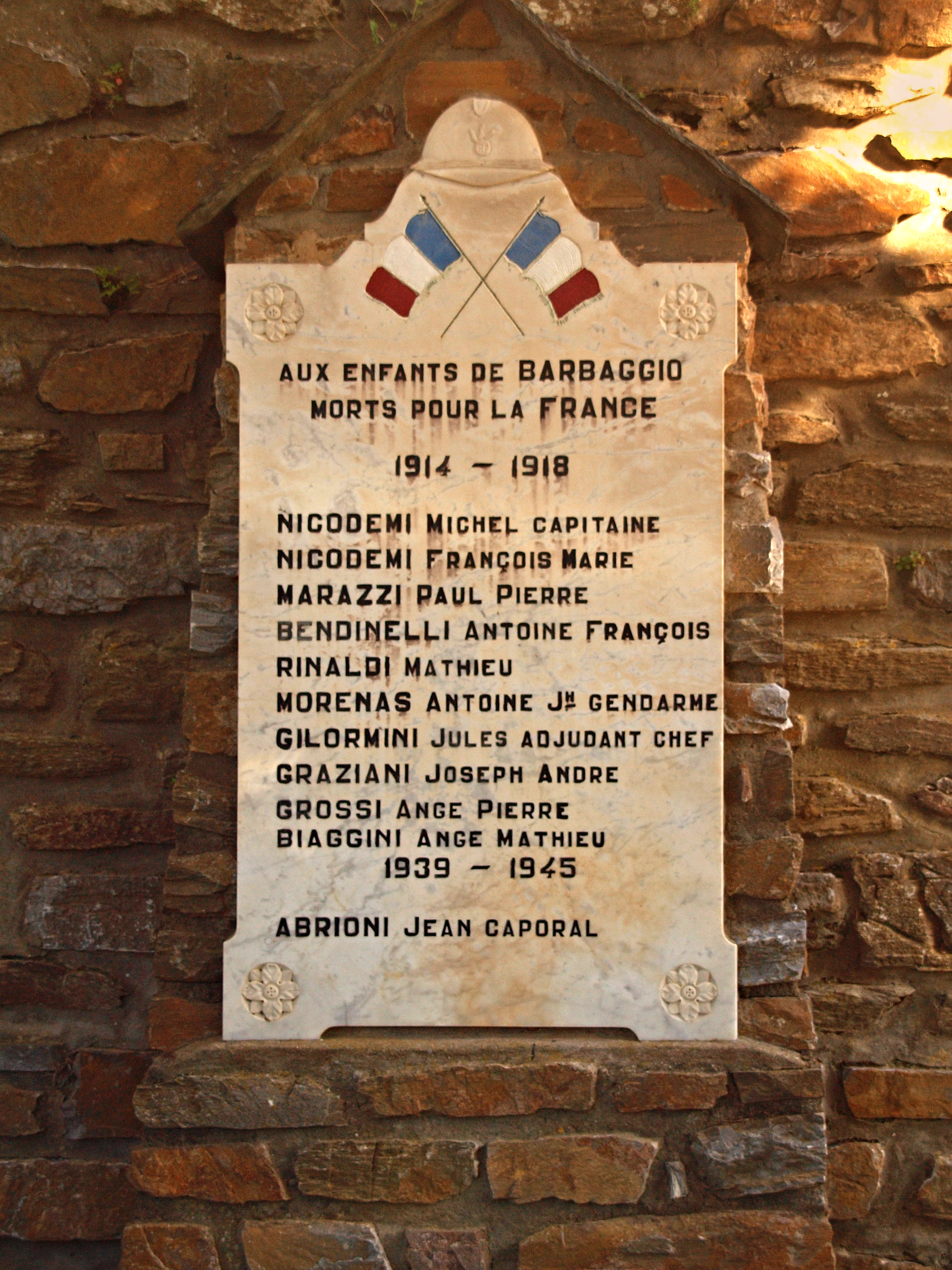
The War Memorial

=== Civil heritage ===
- The Strette I Archaeological Site can be dated to:
  - The Neolithic Era: Bos taurus Linnaeus, 1758 (domestic cattle) Sardinian pika (Wagner, 1832), and Sus scrofa Linnaeus (Wild boar), 1758
  - The Iron Age: Capra hircus Linnaeus, 1758 (Domestic Goat) and Ovis aries Linnaeus, 1758 (domestic Sheep).
- The War memorial is represented by a commemorative plaque on the wall of the "Lieutenant Colonel Pierre Boyer de Latour" Square.

=== Religious Heritage ===
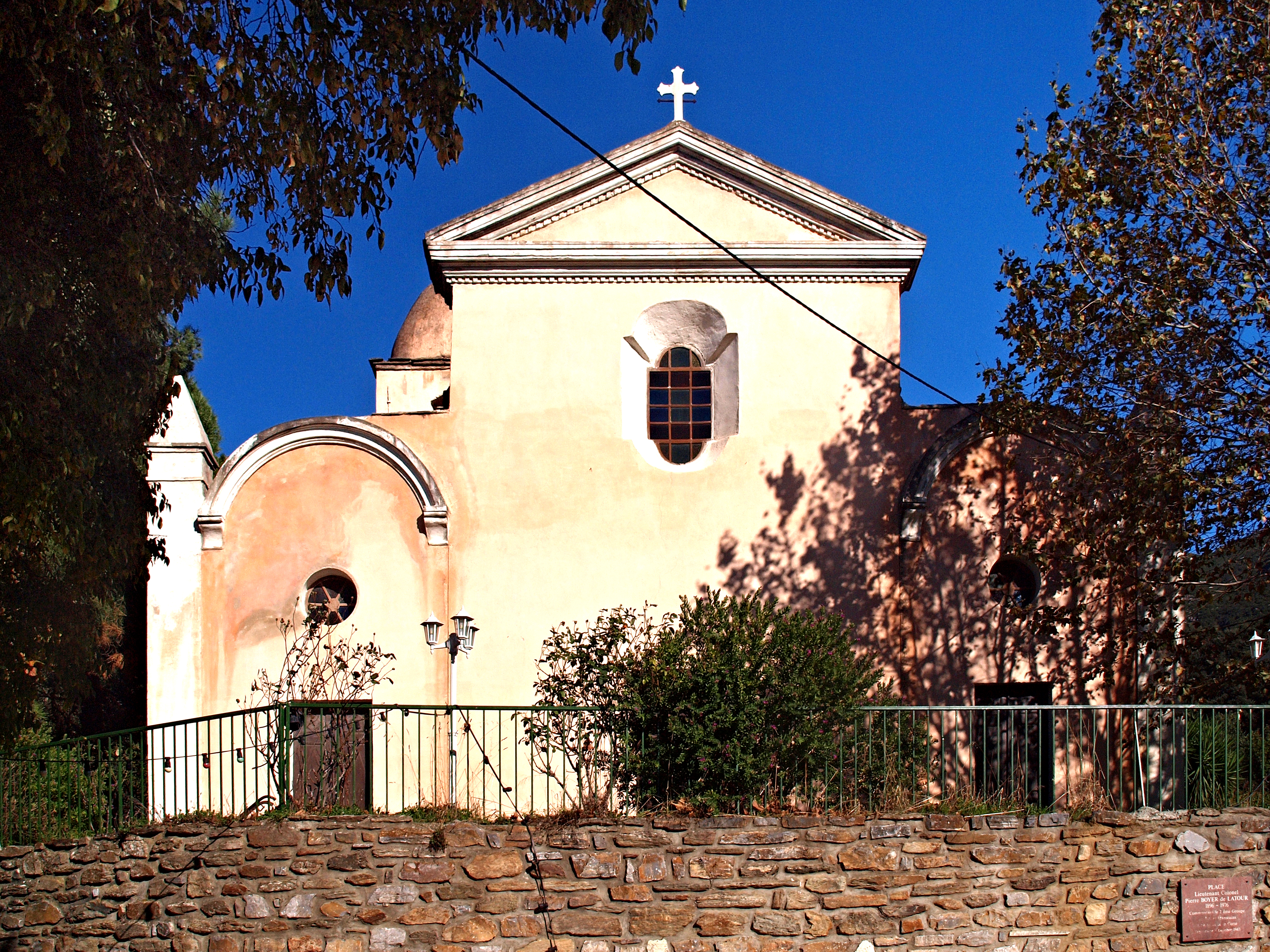
The Church of Saint-Marcel

- The Parish Church of Saint-Marcel (18th century) has a remarkable domed bell tower. The church contains a Painting of Saint Jerome in the Desert (17th century), probably from the former collection of Cardinal Joseph Fesch, which is registered as an historical object.
- The old Church of San Pietro in Pisan Romanesque style from the 11th century was the main church for the Pieve of Patrimonio. Barbaggio was then the capital of the piéve. The church of San Pietro was at the centre of the residential area, now isolated over 200m from houses south of the village. The ruined church, last mentioned in cadastral maps of 1863, is not shown on maps. The arches are still well preserved.

=== Environmental heritage ===
- The Col de Teghime is a strategic passage between the Gulf of Saint-Florent and Bastia. This "high point" of the commune offers a great view on one side of the Gulf of Saint-Florent, the Agriates, and Nebbio, and on the other of the Tyrrhenian Sea with several islands of the Tuscan archipelago, and the Plaine de la Marana. In times of high visibility the Italian coast is visible.
- Barbaggio has three Natural Areas of Ecological Interest, Fauna and Flora (ZNIEFF):
  - The Barbaggio/Teghime Limestone Ridge (940031072);
  - The Asylvatic ridges of Cap Corse (940004076);
  - The Defile of Strette and the Saint-Florent limestone hills (940013101).
- Barbaggio has one Natura 2000 Site of Community Importance:
  - The Barbaggio and Poggio d'Oletta Choux Insulaire covering an area of 67.2 hectares across the communes of Barbaggio and Poggio-d'Oletta. Located in alpine Corsica, the site includes a gray-blue limestone peak with quartz bedrock and refolded with calc-schists.

== Notable people linked to the commune ==
- Pierre Boyer de Latour du Moulin commanded the 2nd Group of Moroccan Tabors who liberated Corsica in September–October 1943.

== See also ==
- History of Corsica
- Prehistory of Corsica
- Communes of the Haute-Corse department
