= Canton of La Conca-d'Oro =

Coordinates: 42°38′00″N 9°21′22″E

The Canton of La Conca-d'Oro (French: canton de La Conca-d'Oro; Corsican: Cantone di A Conca d'Oru; Italian: Cantone della Conca d'Oro) is a former canton of the arrondissement of Bastia, in the department of Haute-Corse, Corsica, France. It had 4,997 inhabitants (2012). It was created 18 August 1973 by the decree 73-825. It was disbanded following the French canton reorganisation which came into effect in March 2015.

The canton comprised the following communes:

- Barbaggio
- Farinole
- Oletta
- Olmeta-di-Tuda
- Patrimonio
- Poggio-d'Oletta
- Saint-Florent
- Vallecalle
