= Col de Teghime =

Mountain pass in Corsica, France

- Bocca di Teghjime (Corsican)
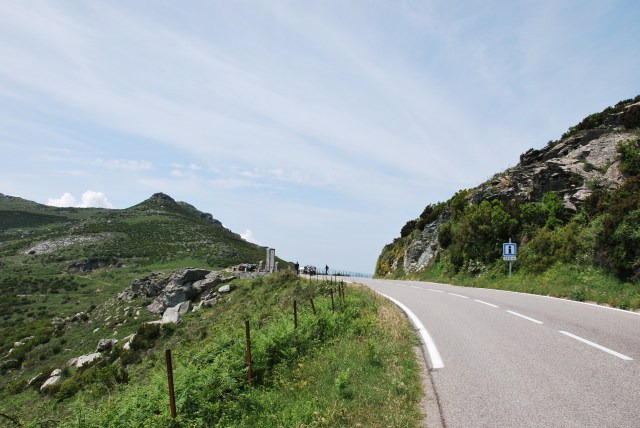
- View near the pass from its eastern side

- Location within Corsica Location within France
- Elevation: 536 m (1,759 ft)

First Approach
- Length: 13 km (8.1 mi)
- Ascent from: Saint-Florent

Second Approach
- Length: 11 km (6.8 mi)
- Ascent from: Bastia

Location
- Range: Monte Stello Massif
- Coordinates: 42°40′37″N 9°22′58″E

The Col de Teghime (Corsican: Bocca di Teghjime) is a mountain pass in the Haute-Corse department of Corsica, France. The pass is in the south of the Monte Stello Massif and is one of the main passes in the island.

== Location ==
The Col de Teghime is in the commune of Barbaggio, south of Cap Corse, between the towns of Bastia and Saint-Florent, linking the micro-regions of Bagnaja and Nebbio. It gives a view of both coasts of Corsica, with Bastia and the Tyrrhenian Sea to the east, Saint-Florent, the Agriates Desert and the Mediterranean Sea to the west.

== Topography ==
The pass is 536 metres (1,759 ft) above sea level. It is flanked by the mountainous arcs of the Serra di Pigno and the Serra d'Oletta, and is the gateway to the west from the metropolis of Bastia towards Saint-Florent and the rich Conca d'Oro, which Pasquale Paoli called "Conca d'Oro, mais Conca di Tradimento" (Basin of Gold, or rather Basin of Betrayal) because it was acquired by Genoa.

== Geology ==
Teghime, also known as the "Col des Ardoises" (Slate Pass), is located within what geographers call "Schist Corsica", as opposed to “Granitic Corsica” in the center and south of the island.

== Climate ==
Located at the foot of the 963 metres (3,159 ft) Pigno, the Col de Teghime is sometimes snow-covered in winter but is rarely closed to traffic.

== Road junction ==
The crossroads of the Col de Teghime is the junction of the roads D 81, which connects Bastia to Ajaccio by the west coast, D 38, which gives access to Poggio-d'Oletta and then to Oletta, and a track leading to the quarry at Ponte Fesso (Barbaggio), south of the col.

== World War II ==
The pass was part of a battle for the liberation of Corsica in early October 1943 during World War II. The capture of the Col de Teghime was crucial in the Liberation of the city of Bastia.

General Charles-Paul-Augustin Louchet's plan of attack set the objective for the troops of Moroccan Goumiers of the French Army of Africa and the Berbers of the 2nd grouping of Moroccan tabors (2nd GTM), to cross the ridges to descend towards the town by road from Saint-Florent.

On 1 October the first attack was made by the goumiers and Corsican resistance fighters against Germans of the 16th SS Reichsführer-SS Panzergrenadier Division at the Col de Teghime.

The first assault was violently repelled. A second assault was made at night but the fierce resistance of the Germans caused the death of 25 combatants. After a day of hard fighting, the Germans surrendered and the pass was taken by the goumiers on the evening of 2 October. The way was then clear to descend on Bastia and, on 4 October, the 73rd Goum entered the liberated city.

== Sources ==
- "Col de Teghime", geoportail (in French)
- "Node: Col de Teghime (82568690)", OpenStreetMap
- Piazza, Marc (2012), Le Siège de Furiani, Bastia: Editions Anima Corsa
- Touron, Christophe, La libération de la Corse 1943
