= Patrimonio (disambiguation) =

Patrimonio is a commune in France. Patrimonio also means 'estate', 'property', 'wealth' or 'heritage' in Latin languages and may refer to

- Patrimonio (surname)
- Patrimonio histórico español, a term for Spain's heritage
- Patrimonio Nacional, a Spanish state agency
- Patrimonio AOC, a brand of Corsica wine
