= Santu River =

Stream in the department of Haute-Corse, Corsica

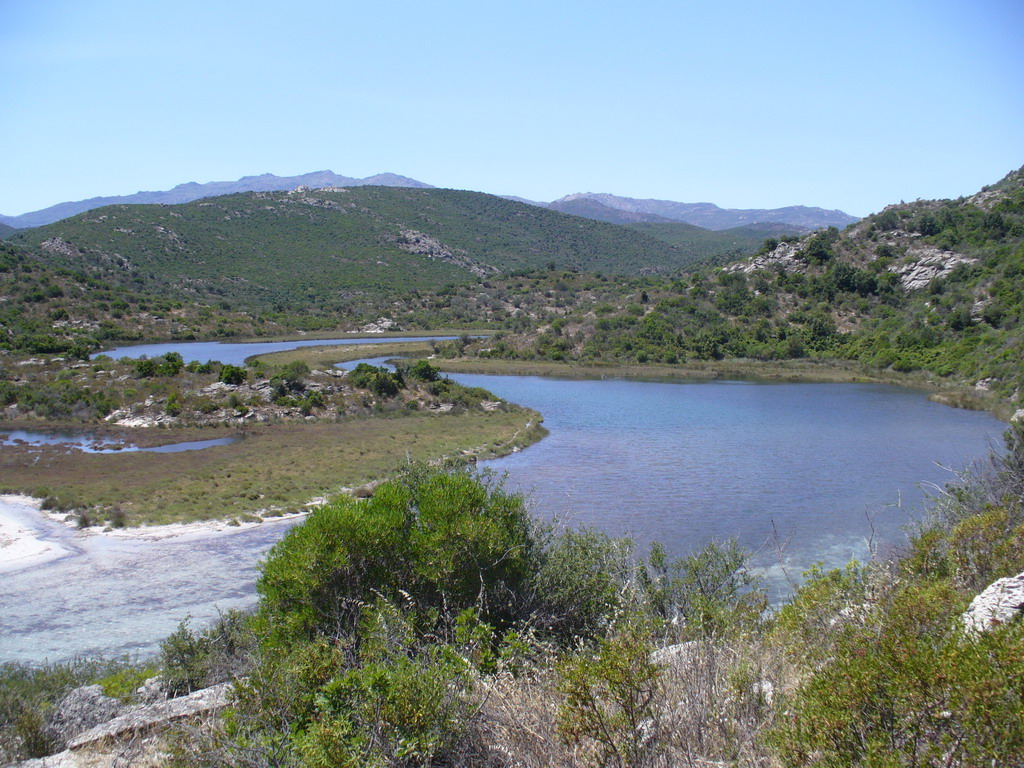
- Santu near its mouth

- Location within Corsica Location within France
- Native name: Fiume Santu (Corsican)

Location
- Country: France
- Region: Corsica
- Department: Haute-Corse

Physical characteristics
- Mouth: Mediterranean Sea
  - coordinates: 42.7055°N 9.255°E
- Length: 9.9 kilometres (6.2 mi)

The Santu River (Corsican: Fiume Santu) is a small coastal river in the department of Haute-Corse, Corsica, France.

== Course ==
The Santu is 9.9 kilometres (6.2 mi) long. It crosses the communes of Saint-Florent and Santo-Pietro-di-Tenda. The Santu rises in the commune of Santo-Pietro-di-Tenda to the southeast of the 421 metres (1,381 ft) Monte Genova. It flows in a generally northeast direction to enter the sea in the Golfe de Saint-Florent to the south of the Torra di Mortella. The D81 runs past its source, but otherwise there are no roads along its course.

== Environment ==
The small white sand beach at the river mouth with its turquoise water is popular with boaters coming from the port of Saint-Florent, as are other beaches of the Agriates Desert.

Behind the beach there is a well preserved wetland covering about 17 hectares (42 acres). It is owned by the Conservatoire du littoral and managed by the department of Haute-Corse. It is important as a landscape and for its plant diversity. It contains meadows of salt-tolerant rushes, with large populations of samphire that turn red in the fall. The European pond turtle (Emys orbicularis) frequents the site. Amphibians include the European green toad (Bufo viridis), the Sardinian tree frog (Hyla sarda) and the Tyrrhenian painted frog (Discoglossus sardus). Birds include mallard (Anas platyrhynchos), little grebe (Tachybaptus ruficollis) and common moorhen (Gallinula chloropus).

== Tributaries ==
The following streams (ruisseaux) are tributaries of the Santu, ordered by length, and sub-tributaries:

- Suarella: 4 km (2.5 mi)
  - Batagliola: 3 km (1.9 mi)
  - Piedovalle: 2 km (1.2 mi)
- Panne Rossu: 2 km (1.2 mi)
- Teti: 2 km (1.2 mi)
- Paratella: 2 km (1.2 mi)

== Sources ==
- Embouchures du Fiume Santu et du Fiume Bughju (ou Valdolese) (in French), Conseil général de Haute Corse
- "Fiume Santu", Sandre (in French)
- "Relation: Fiume Santu (8719282)", OpenStreetMap
