= Santu =

Santu may refer to:

- Santu River, small coastal river in the department of Haute-Corse, Corsica, France
- Santou (locally, Santu), a town and sub-prefecture in the Télimélé Prefecture in the Kindia Region of western-central Guinea
