= Agriates Desert =

Protected area in Corsica, France

- Désert des Agriates or les Agriates (French); l'Agriate (Corsican)
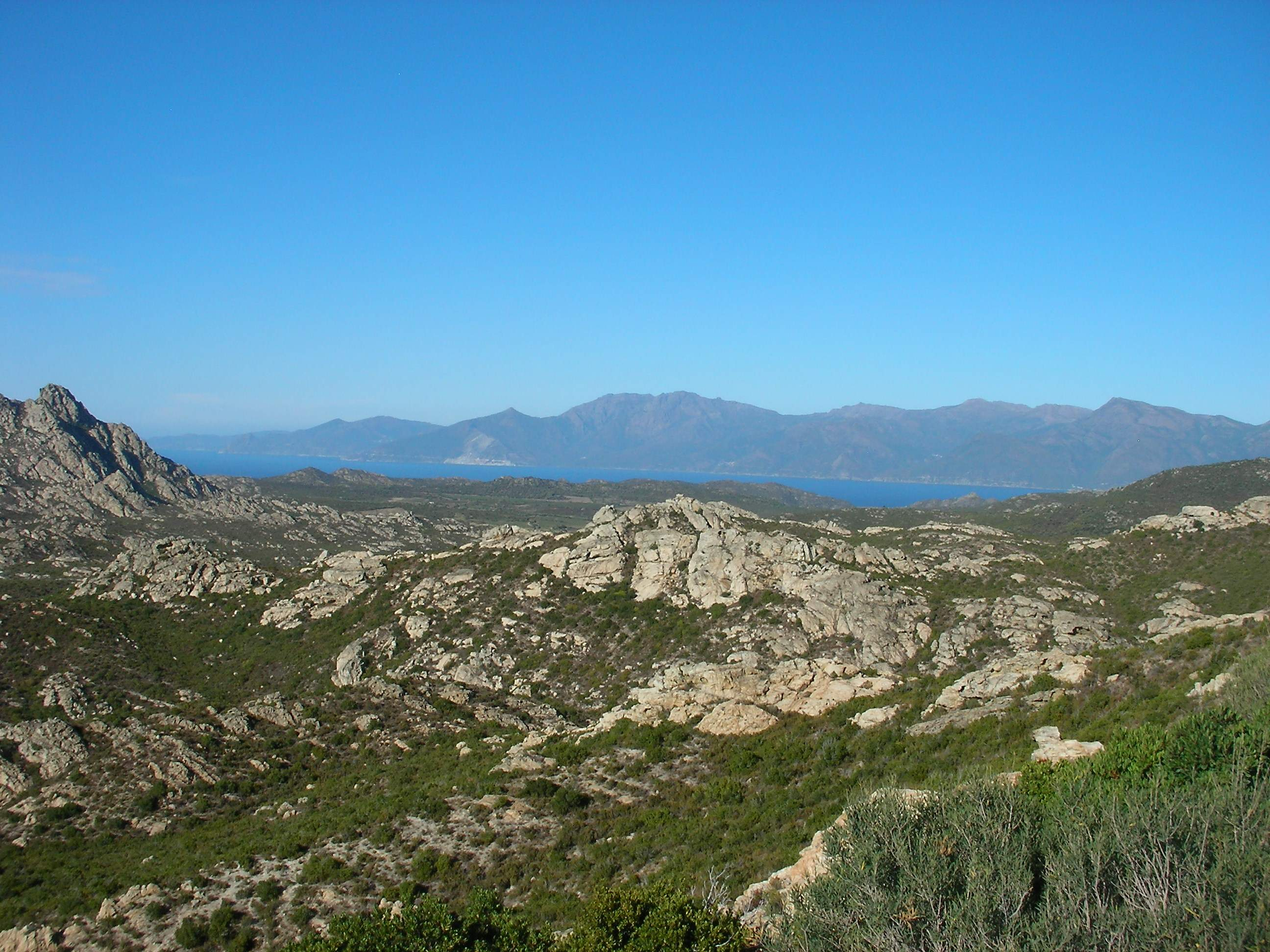
- Landscape of the Agriates Desert in Haute-Corse.

- Location within Corsica

Geography
- Country: Corsica, France
- Coordinates: 42°42′N 9°10′E
- Interactive map of Agriates Desert

The Agriates Desert or the Agriates (désert des Agriates in French and l'Agriate in Corsican) is an area of Corsica split between the micro-regions of Balagne and Nebbio in Haute-Corse.

== Geography ==
=== Location ===
The Agriates Desert is a territory bordered to the south by a mountain range, the Serra di Tenda, and on all other sides by the Mediterranean Sea. The territory is divided, from west to east, between the communes of Palasca, San-Gavino-di-Tenda, Santo-Pietro-di-Tenda, and Saint-Florent. The Agriates are largely uninhabited, with the exception of the scattered village of Casta.

Some tourist guides describe the Agriates as the only desert in Western Europe, but that is false: Spain is notably home to the Tabernas Desert and the Bardenas Reales, and Iceland has its cold Ódáðahraun Desert.

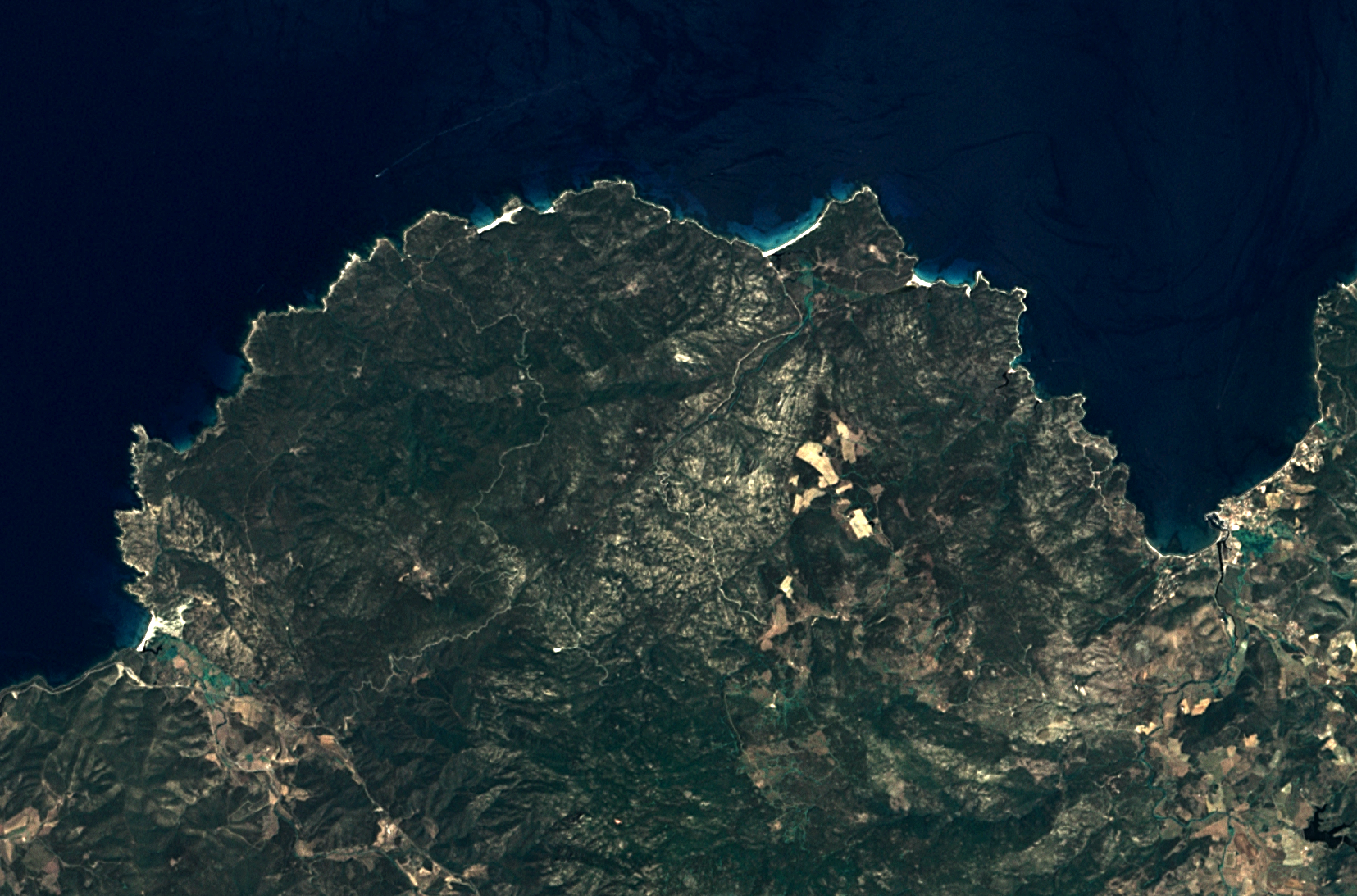
Satellite view of the Agriates.

=== Geology and terrain ===
Covering an area of approximately 15,000 hectares, the Agriates are geographically demarcated by:

- 37 km of virgin coast to the north
- Departmental Route 81 and the foothills of the Serra di Tenda to the south
- the Ostriconi Valley to the west
- the Gulf of Saint-Florent to the north, and the plain of Nebbio to the east.

Located at the foothills of the Serra di Tenda to the south, the Agriates extend northward to the sea. The desert is divided into two roughly equal parts, separated by the Liscu River.

Most of the western sector, marked by rhyolite and tuff formations, is a protected area. The less rugged eastern sector, made up of ancient granite rocks, has flatter parts that are still home to vineyards—in the 1800s, the Agriates were considered the breadbasket of Corsica. Mt. Genova, at 421 meters, is its highest point. The area is home to two dolmens that are protected under a monument historique classification.

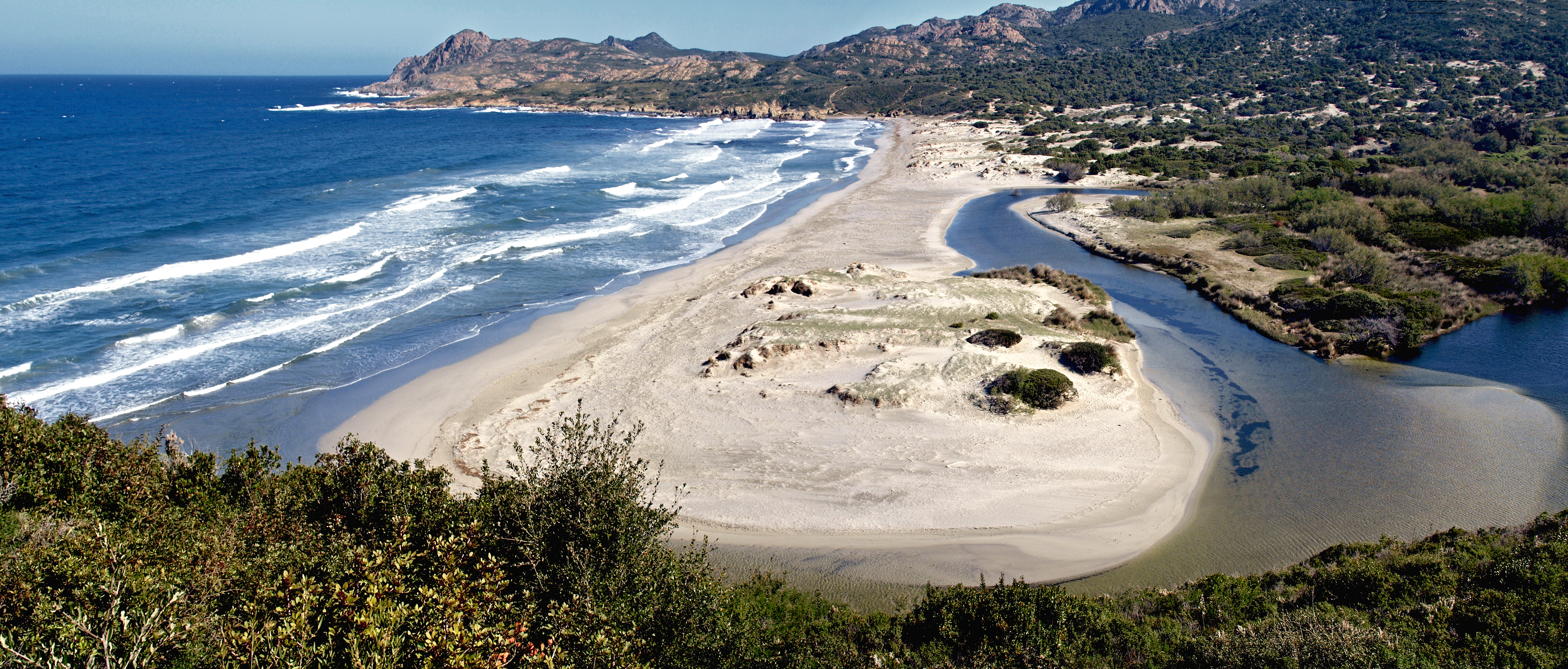
Ostriconi, the western edge of the Agriates.

The Agriates' maritime border consists of a jagged coastline, with a series of capes and sandy beaches. It is home to a coastal trail known as the sentier des douaniers ("custom officers' path"). The ruins of three Genoese surveillance towers, the Mortella and Fornali towers to the east and the Ostriconi tower to the west, can be found along the coast.

Notable sites along the coast, from east to west, are:

- Plage de la Roya (a beach in Saint-Florent)
- the cove of Fornali, its 1762 Paoline tower, and its lighthouse
- Punta Mortella, its Genoese tower (Torra di Mortella), and its lighthouse
- the neighboring islet of La Pignata
- Plage du Loto (a beach shared between the communes of Saint-Florent and Santo-Pietro-di-Tenda)
- Punta di Curza, the northernmost point
- Faghjula Cove and Plage de Saleccia
- Punta di Mignola
- Plage de Trave
- Punta Negra
- Plage de Ghignu
- Punta di Pietra Alta and Plage d'Alga Putrica
- Malfalcu Cove, with its tower base and beach
- Punta di Malfalcu
- Arghiaghiu Cove
- Punta di Solche
- Acciolu Bay, with a beach at the base of Recisa Cove
- Punta di l'Acciolu (Palasca)
- Pinzuta Cove
- Vana Cove
- Punta di Paraghiola
- Peraiola Cove and Plage de l'Ostriconi

There is a marshy area between Plage de Saleccia and Plage du Loto, which includes Padulella, Pardinela, and Cannuta marshes. It contains the ponds of Panecalellu and of Loto. Many streams flow through the Agriates. From east to west, the major ones are: Valdolèse, Santu, Panecalellu, Niolincu, Liscu, Scalavita, Toccone, Scruchiella, Alga, Tettu, Sualelli, and Tafonatu.

=== Climate and vegetation ===
The Agriates have long been a land of agriculture. The Genoese colonizers made this region the focus of their wheat and olive production. Until the start of the 20th century, figs, citrons, and almonds were also produced there.

Transhumance was also practiced there, and about 100 flocks of sheep or ewes remained at the end of the 19th century.

The Agriates, whose name's etymology refers to agrarian lands, suitable for conservation, are today referred to as a "desert," but the designation is a bit misleading. Unlike the image many hold of a desert, there is abundant local vegetation adapted to the local climate, including such common maquis plants as strawberry trees, briar root, myrtle spurge, rockrose, linstisques, evergreen oak, and olive trees. There are also maritime pines, remnants of 20th-century plantations.

The climate is characterized by very high temperatures during the summer, when dry and hot winds blow across the region. Rainfall is rare, but when it appears it is usually part of a heavy storm.

=== Access ===
Departmental Route 81 crosses the territory from east to west, from Saint-Florent to the Ostriconi Valley, where it rejoins RN 197 at a place called Petra Moneta, passing through the Vezzu pass (Bocca di Vezzu) at 311 meters above sea level. RD 81 marks the southern edge of the Agriates Desert.

In addition to the trail along the coast, several paths provide access to the main sites of the Agriates. From RD 18 there are two main trails headed north. The first, which is 13 km long, starts in Bocca di Vezzu and leads to Malfalcu Cove or to Plage de Ghignu. The second leaves from Casta and travels 12 km to Saleccia and its beach. From RT 30, there is a road that runs about 10 km to Cala di l'Arghiaghiu. There are signs throughout warning visitors of the level of fire risk, which when particularly high can lead to the closure of certain routes.

Sea shuttles provide access to the Loto and Saleccia beaches from Saint-Florent.

== Urbanization ==
Casta, a village in the Santo-Pietro-di-Tenda commune and the only town in the desert, is located along RD81. Houses and a small number of shops are scattered across a 4 km stretch of the road. In the middle of the village, along the roadside, is the San Pancraziu chapel, which is built from blocks of white granite.

In the mid-20th century, tourist development was planned for a large portion of the western Agriates, owned by the Casabianca and Rothschild families. A 1,000-bed project by the Malfalcu marina was considered, and roads began to be built in the desert. But the Conservatoire du littoral conservation organization patiently bought up all of the territory's coastline, protecting more than 5,600 hectares and 37 km of coasts.

== History ==
=== Pre-history ===
The site has been occupied since the Neolithic period, as evidenced by archeological expeditions and the dolmens of Mt. Revincu, present in Casta-Nord and classified as monuments historiques since 1889.

=== Middle Ages ===
Bishop Agostino Giustiniani, appointed to the Roman Catholic Diocese of Nebbio, gave the following description of the Agriates in his Dialogo on September 11, 1514:

"After Mortella comes the beach of Cavallata, the little port, Peralto, the point of Corsa, the beach of Saleccia with a stream, the point of Mignola, Trave beach, the point of Giunepreto, Giugno beach, the point of Timoni, the litte Malfalco port, Alga beach, the point of Solche, the calangue of Suppe, the point of Lacciuolo, the calangue of Gueno, and finally Porraggiola beach. From there to Mortella is around 20 miles. This region is called l'Agriata, and it is linked to Nebbio, because the cathedral church of Nebbio and many other parishes in this diocese collect tithes there. On the coast, as in the interior, l'Agriata is a completely inhabited area. There are many fields of wheat or, as the Corsicans say, of prese, cultivated by the people of Nebbio or of Cap Corse. The products of l'Agriata are very delicious; the wheat, the meat, even the fish are the most exquisite in all of Corsica." — Agostino Giustiniani, translated to English from a French translation by the abbot Lucien Auguste Letteron in Histoire de la Corse Tome I, Description de la Corse - Bastia Imprimerie et librairie Ollagnier - 1890 p. 16

In 1584, the island was hit by a famine, and all resources were scarce. Letterton writes, "The sole cause, or at least the main cause, of the famine that reigned during those sad years must be the abandonment of their rich and opulent villages by the inhabitants of the coast, who, in order to flee the attacks of the barbarians, had withdrawn during the earlier wars to the arid and barren mountains. Thus, the village of Agriata and part of Ostricone were abandoned.

For several centuries, the Agriates served as the "breadbasket of Corsica," before returning to their wild state at the end of the 19th century. The Republic of Genoa, which lacked a sufficiently developed hinterland, also farmed in the Agriates to feed its metropolitan population. For a long period the land was used from June to October by farmers who came by sea on small boats from Cap Corse (Nonza, Farinole, Centuri) or from Balagne. They stayed until the harvest and left after the clearing, plowing, and autumn sowing. They then were replaced with sheep herders, who came down from the mountains for the winter. As the farmers left and herders arrived, they would exchange their products: cheese for wheat or oil.

=== Modern period ===
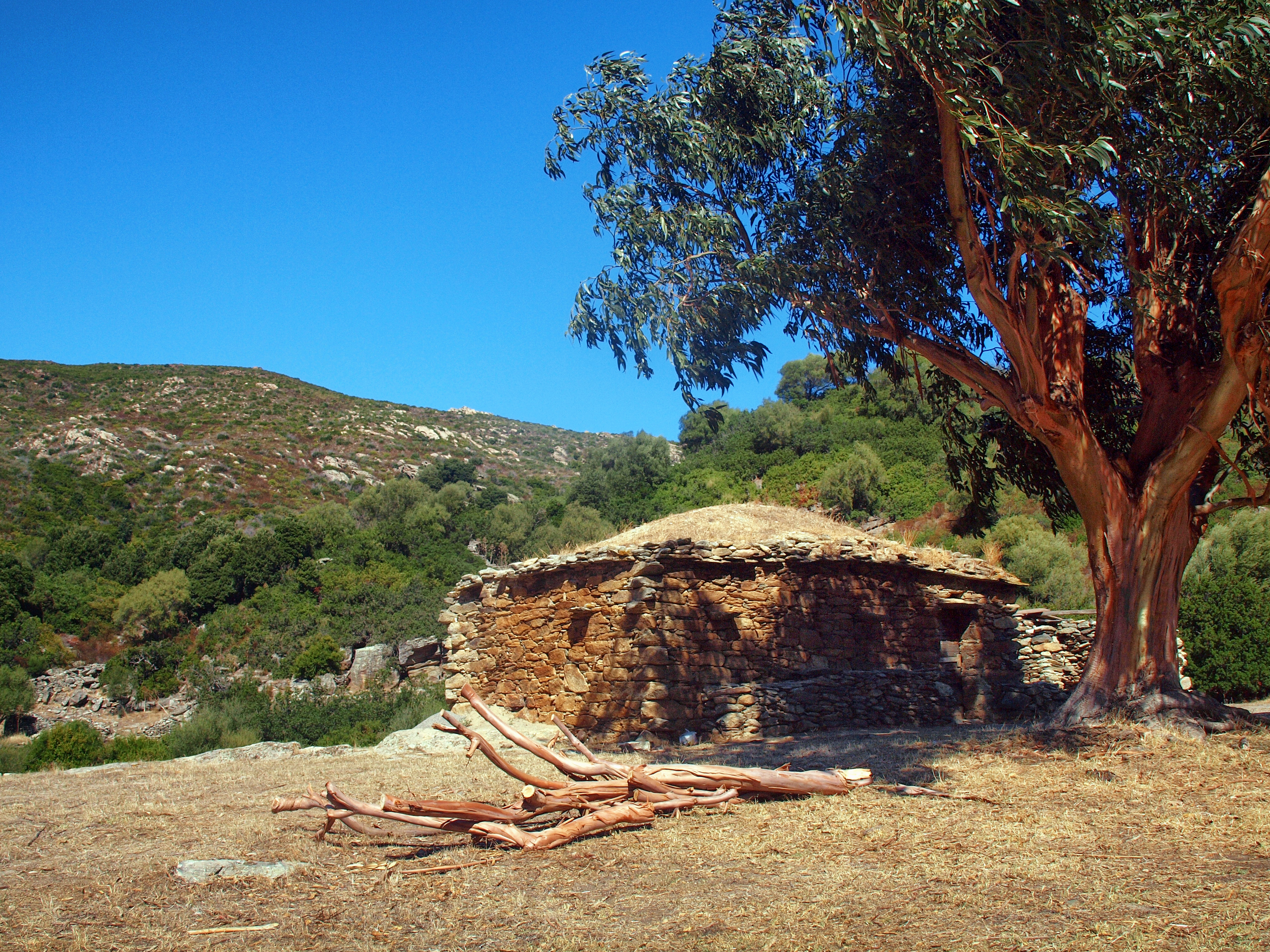
A pagliaghju structure in the eastern Agriates Desert.

Until the start of the 20th century, wheat, citrus fruits (citrons, lemons, mandarin oranges), olive trees, fig trees, and other crops were cultivated there. However, controlled burns and wildfires overtook the fertile land.

Human habitation has left many traces in the Agriates Desert. For housing, farmers and herders had built pagliaghji, a kind of shack known as palliers in French. Pagliaghju were dry stone huts, with rounded roofs or terraces, which were used as homes, to hold sheep, or to store wheat, hay, or tools. They contained a single room with one door. Though the structures are long abandoned, some are still in good condition, while others have been restored and converted into tourist rentals, including in Alga Putrica, west of Guignu beach.

=== Present day ===
In 1958, the Agriates Desert was considered as a nuclear test site.

In the eastern Agriates lies the Casta firing range, which consists of two zones, separated by the D81 road. It is still operational and is used by soldiers from the 2nd Foreign Parachute Regiment of the French Foreign Legion, based in Calvi. There are two dolmens in the northern part of the shooting range, 700 meters southwest of Mt. Revincu, which are classified as historic monuments.

== Economy ==
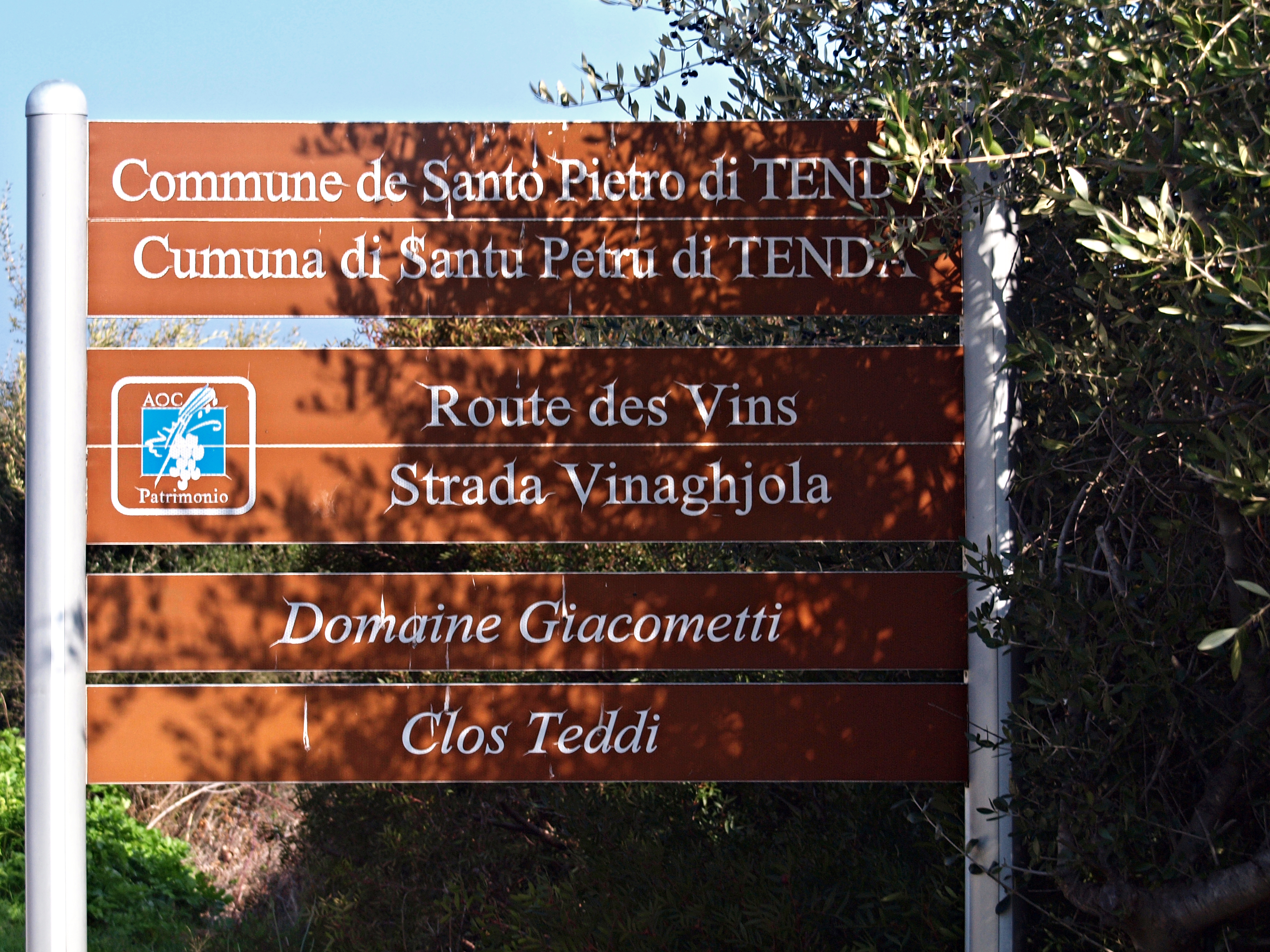
A sign marking the wine trail in Casta.

The region's few shops, hotels, and restaurants are located along the road that passes through Casta. The only restaurant along the entire Agriates coast is in Saleccia.

Viticulture and mixed farming are still the main agricultural activities there. To the north of Casta are two wine estates, each with around 35 hectares of grapevines, located within the perimeter of Corsica's Patrimonio wine region. The region's few farms are reached by a path that starts north of Casta. At least one shepherd has been authorized by the Conservatoire du littoral to operate in the Agriates Desert.

At the spot known as Bartolacciu, there is a small dam built on the Bartolacciu stream (a section of the Fiume Santu).

== Landmarks ==
=== Natural heritage ===
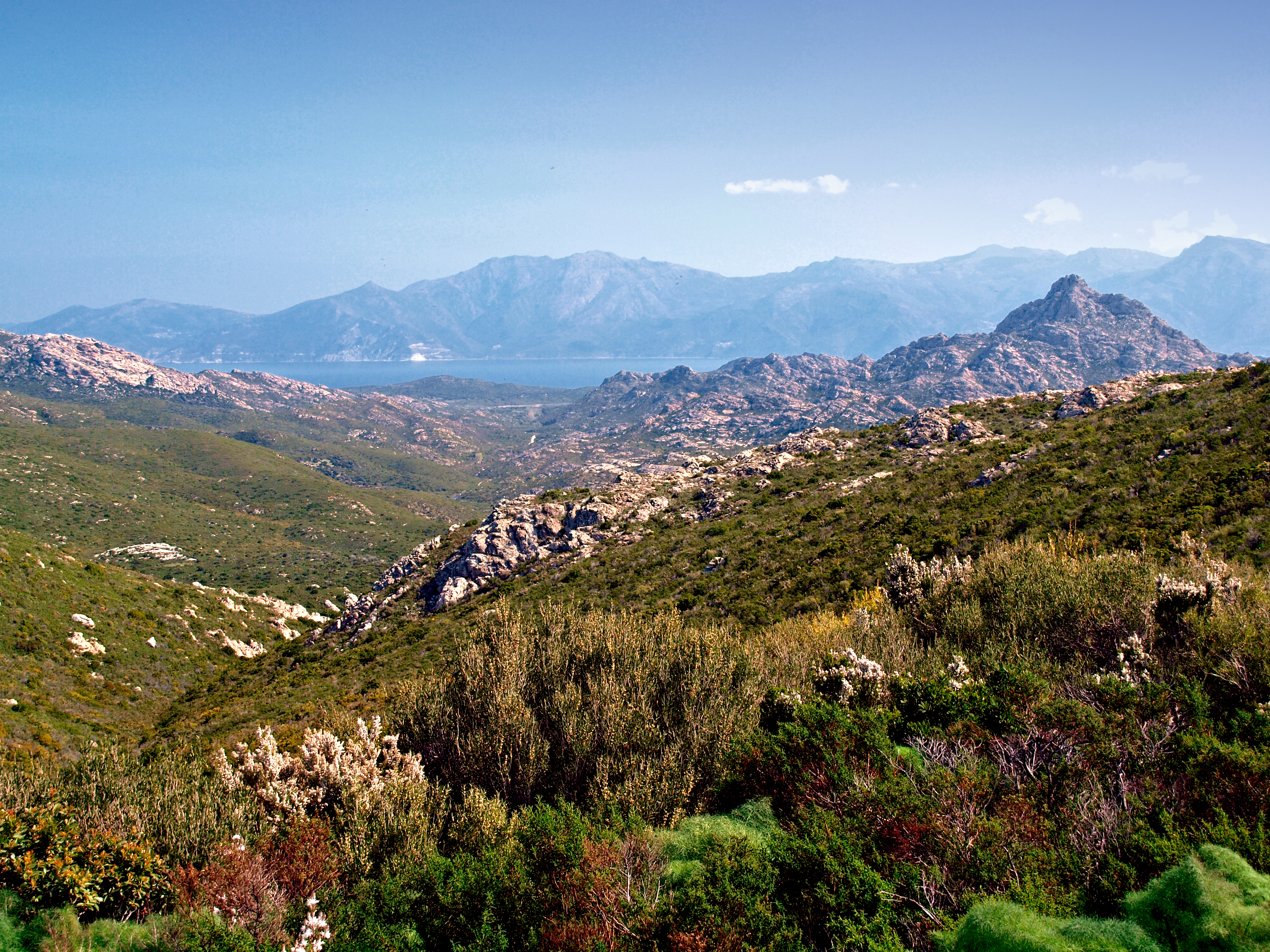
A view of the Agriates from Bocca di Vezzu.

==== Conservatoire du littoral ====
Since 1979, 5,532 hectares of the Agriates Desert, representing 37 kilometers of coastline, have been acquired by the Conservatoire du littoral. Another 5,000 hectares are owned by the communes of Palasca, San-Gavino-di-Tenda, Santo-Pietro-di-Tenda, and Saint-Florent. The remaining third, another 5,000 hectares or so, is private property. The area is protected under Inventaire national du patrimoine naturel code FR1100014 - Agriate.

Today, the Conservatoire controls a third of the land and the marine area, serving as a long-term guarantor of the natural landscape.

After a consultation, the Conservatoire and the departmental council have put together a territorial project and a development plan that is financially supported by the Office de l'environnement de la Corse. The department of Haute-Corse is responsible for the management of the region, which includes surveillance, maintenance, public access, and development.

Since 2008, eight departmental coast guard officers have been responsible for managing the territory. One of these agents handles overnight visitors to the beach at Ghignu in the summer. Their responsibilities are numerous, including maintaining and cleaning beaches and trails. In the summer, they contribue to the desert's fire prevention system, warning visitors when the Saleccia trail is closed on high-risk days. They are also given the power of law enforcement officers and can issue a procès-verbal, enabling them to combat illegal camping, fires, and off-road driving. The officers traverse the region by foot, on horseback, in four-wheel-drive vehicles, and by boat.

There is a guard house in Saleccia, consisting of an old pagliaghju restored by the Conservatoire.

==== ZNIEFF ====
There are three sites recognized as second-generation Zone naturelle d'intérêt écologique, faunistique et floristique (ZNIEFF) in the Agriates Desert:

- Ostriconi dunes, beach, and wetland
  - The area covers 373 hectares, surrounding the mouth of the Ostriconi River, and is primarily composed of a large beach with sparse vegetation, a vast stretch of dunes, and sandy terraces. It is registered as ZNIEFF 940004143.
- Aleppo pine woods of Punta di Curza
  - This natural area of ecological, faunistic, and floristic interest covers 150 hectares on the coast of the Agriates. It is made up of juniper dunes and wooded pine dunes (Saleccia) that are 4 to 5 meters high, with a matorral shrub landscape made up of wild olive trees and rockrose. It is protected under ZNIEFF 940004072.
- Mouths of the Santu River and the Valdolese
  - This area covers the mouths of two small, low-flow rivers, which wind between two rocky massifs and form small bodies of water behind the coastal beaches. The aquatic environment offers a degree of biological richness that is increasingly rare in this kind of small wetland.

==== Natura 2000 ====
The region is designated as part of the Europe-wide Natura 2000 network, registered as FR9400570.

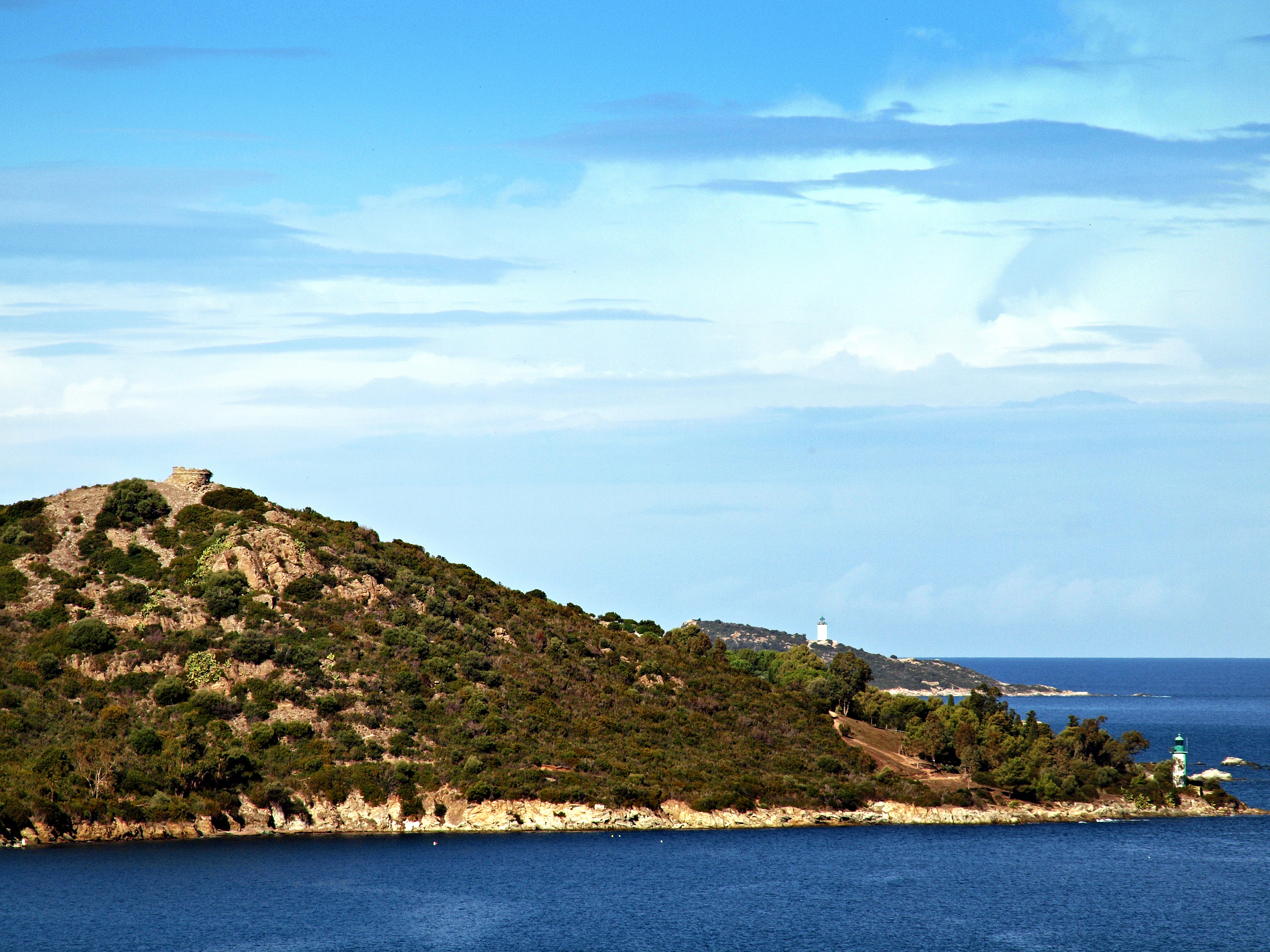
A view of the Fornali Tower.

=== Architectural heritage ===
- Mortella Tower
  - This tower was built in 1553 and fortified in 1554, during the Corsican War, by Admiral Adrea Doria. It is the only tower along the Agriates coast that remained throughout the 17th and 18th centuries and until today. It is a registered historic monument.
- Ostriconi Tower
  - This tower, also known as the Fornali, Parajola, or Vana Tower, is a rectangular Genoese tower (6 by 7 meters) that is found to the north of the i magazini ruins and the Ostriconi beach, overlooking the Punta di Paraghiola. This Genoese tower was part of a defense system for the Agriates and Saint-Florent, constructed by the Genoese in the 16th century.
- Other towers
  - In total, a dozen towers were planned to be built along the Agriates coast and the Gulf of Saint-Florent from Punta di Paraghiola in the west to the Calanca di a Torre below the Punta Vecchiaia to the east. While some of the towers were fully constructed, for others only the base was built.
