= Torra di Ferringule =

Genoese coastal defence tower in Corsica

Tower of Ferringule
- Torra di Ferringule (Corsican)
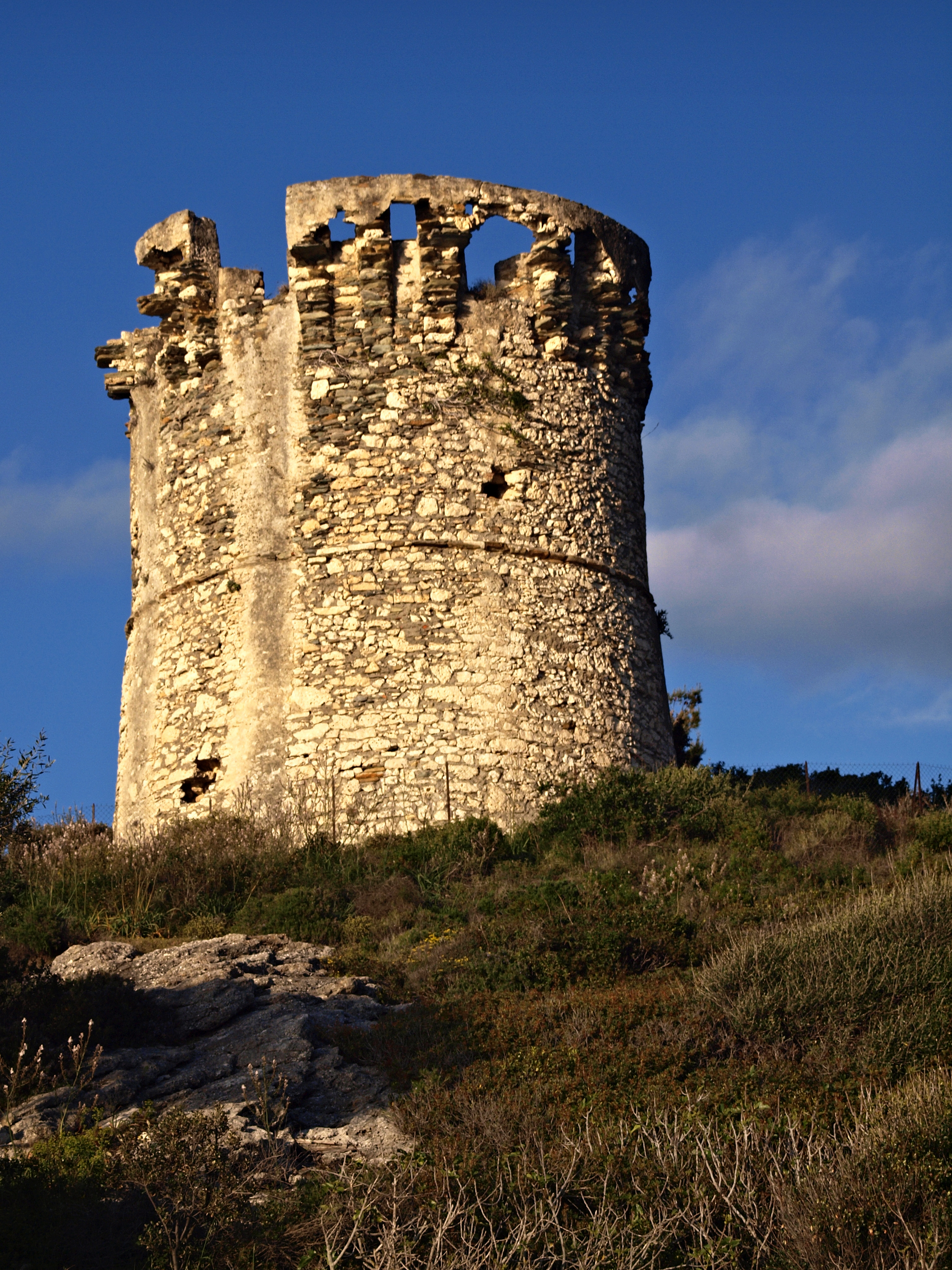

- Location within Corsica
- 42°43′55″N 9°20′34″E

History
- Built: 1562

Monument historique
- Designated: 23 June 1993
- Reference no.: PA00125391

The Tower of Ferringule (Corsican: Torra di Ferringule, French: Tour de Farinole) is a Genoese tower located in the commune of Farinole (Haute-Corse) on the west coast of Cap Corse.

The tower was one of a series of coastal defences built by the Republic of Genoa between 1530 and 1620 to stem the attacks by Barbary pirates. The tower was built in 1562 and is included in a list compiled by the Genoese authorities in 1617 that records that the tower was guarded at night by two men who were paid by the village of Farinole.

In 1993 the tower was listed as one of the official historical monuments of France.

== See also ==
- List of Genoese towers in Corsica
