= Buggiu =

River in the department of Haute-Corse, Corsica

- Location within Corsica Location within France

Location
- Country: France
- Region: Corsica
- Department: Haute-Corse

Physical characteristics
- Mouth: Mediterranean Sea
  - coordinates: 42.7003°N 9.2598°E
- Length: 10.07 kilometres (6.26 mi)

The Buggiu (French: Fiume Buggiu, Corsican: Bughju) or Valdolese, Vughio is a small coastal river in the department of Haute-Corse, Corsica, France. It flows into the Golfe de Saint-Florent in the north of the island. The estuary at its mouth has ecological value.

== Course ==
The Buggiu is 10.07 kilometres (6.26 mi) long. It crosses the communes of Saint-Florent and Santo-Pietro-di-Tenda. The river is in the Balagna-Agriate region. It rises in the commune of Santo-Pietro-di-Tenda to the north of the 649 metres (2,129 ft) Cima di Campo a u Scudu. It flows in a generally north-northeast direction to enter the sea to the west of the port of Saint-Florent. It is crossed by the D81 road, but there is no road along its course.

== Estuary ==
A sandy bar crosses the mouth of the river. The river sometimes cuts through the bar to flow into the sea. The temporary pool that forms behind the bar has ecological value that may be affected by climate change. The estuary of the river is a wetland of brackish water covering 1.8 hectares (4.4 acres). The land has been acquired by the Conservatoire du littoral, and is part of the Cap Corse et Agriate marine national park. Fauna include European pond turtle (Emys orbicularis), European green toad (Bufotes viridis), Tyrrhenian painted frog (Discoglossus sardus), Sardinian tree frog (Hyla sarda), mallard (Anas platyrhynchos), common moorhen (Gallinula chloropus) and little grebe (Tachybaptus ruficollis).

== Tributaries ==
The following streams (ruisseaux) are tributaries of the Buggiu (ordered by length) and sub-tributaries:

- Purette: 6 km (3.7 mi)
  - Spizicciu: 1 km (0.62 mi)
- Valdolèse: 2 km (1.2 mi)

== Sources ==
- "Fiume Buggiu", Sandre (in French)
- Fiume Vughio (ou Fiume Buggiu) (PDF) (in French), SHOM
- "FR834COR379 - Esturaire du Fiume Buggiu", PIM Initiative, Corsican Environment Office (OEC)
- Plan de bassin d’adaptation au changement climatique dans le domaine de l’eau Bassin de Corse (in French), Comité de Bassin de Corse, 24 September 2018
- "Relation: Fiume Buggiu (8719259)", OpenStreetMap
- "Tour de Mortella", Paradisu (in French)
