= Torra di Mortella =

Genoese coastal defence tower in Corsica

Tower of Mortella
- Torre di Mortella (Corsican)
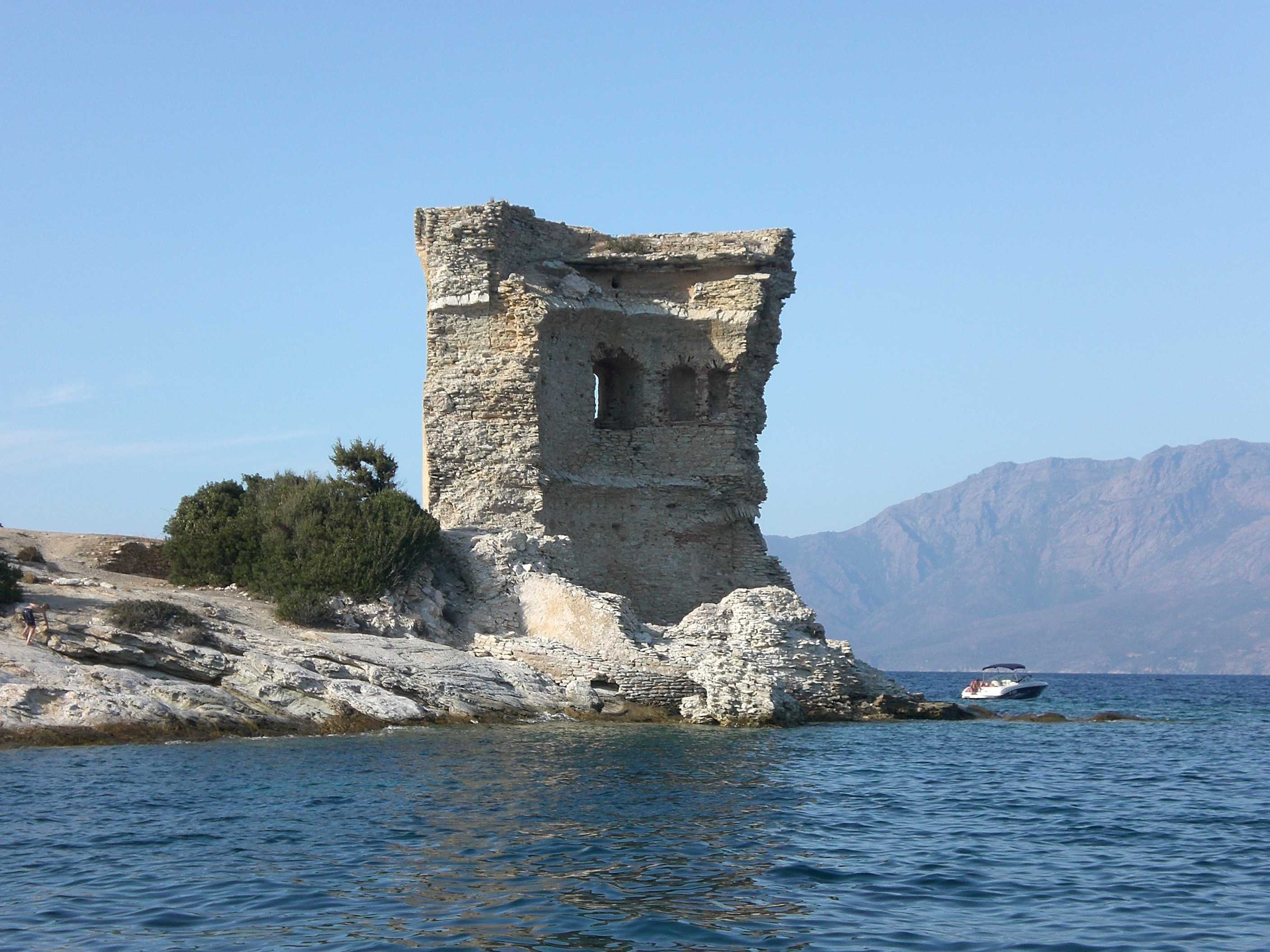

- Location within Corsica
- 42°42′54″N 9°15′25″E
- Location: Saint-Florent, Haute-Corse

History
- Built: 1563-1564

Site notes
- Architect: Giovan Giacomo Paleari Fratino

Monument historique
- Designated: 1991
- Reference no.: PA00099279

The Tower of Mortella (Corsican: Torra di Mortella) is a ruined Genoese tower on Corsica, located on the coast near Punta Mortella (Myrtle Point) in the commune of Saint-Florent, Haute-Corse. It was a progenitor of the numerous Martello towers the British built in the 19th century throughout their empire.

== History ==
The Italian architect Giovan Giacomo Paleari Fratino designed the Tour de Mortella and Colonel Giorgio Doria directed the construction between 1563 and 1564. It was one of a series of coastal defences constructed by the Republic of Genoa between 1530 and 1620 to repulse attacks by Barbary pirates.

On 7 February 1794, two British warships, HMS Fortitude (74 guns) and HMS Juno (32 guns), unsuccessfully attacked the tower at Mortella Point; the tower eventually fell to land-based forces under Major-General David Dundas and Lieutenant-General John Moore after two days of heavy fighting.

Late in the previous year, the tower's French defenders had abandoned the tower after HMS Lowestoffe (32 guns) had fired two broadsides at it. The French easily dislodged the garrison of Corsican patriots that had replaced them. Still, the British were impressed by the effectiveness of the tower when it was properly supplied and defended so they copied the design. However, they misspelled the name as "Martello" for "Mortella". When the British withdrew from Corsica in 1796, they blew up the tower and left it in an unusable state.

== Current status ==
The ruined tower was listed as one of the official Historical Monuments of France in 1991. The database incorrectly gives the date of construction as 1553–1554. This earlier date is when Spanish and Genoese troops led by Admiral Andrea Doria besieged the French forces occupying the port of Saint-Florent after the Franco-Turkish invasion of the island.

Since 1980 the French government agency the Conservatoire du littoral has owned and maintained the site. The Conservatoire plans to purchase 6,663 hectares (16,460 acres) of the surrounding coastline and as of 2017 had acquired 5,935 hectares (14,670 acres).

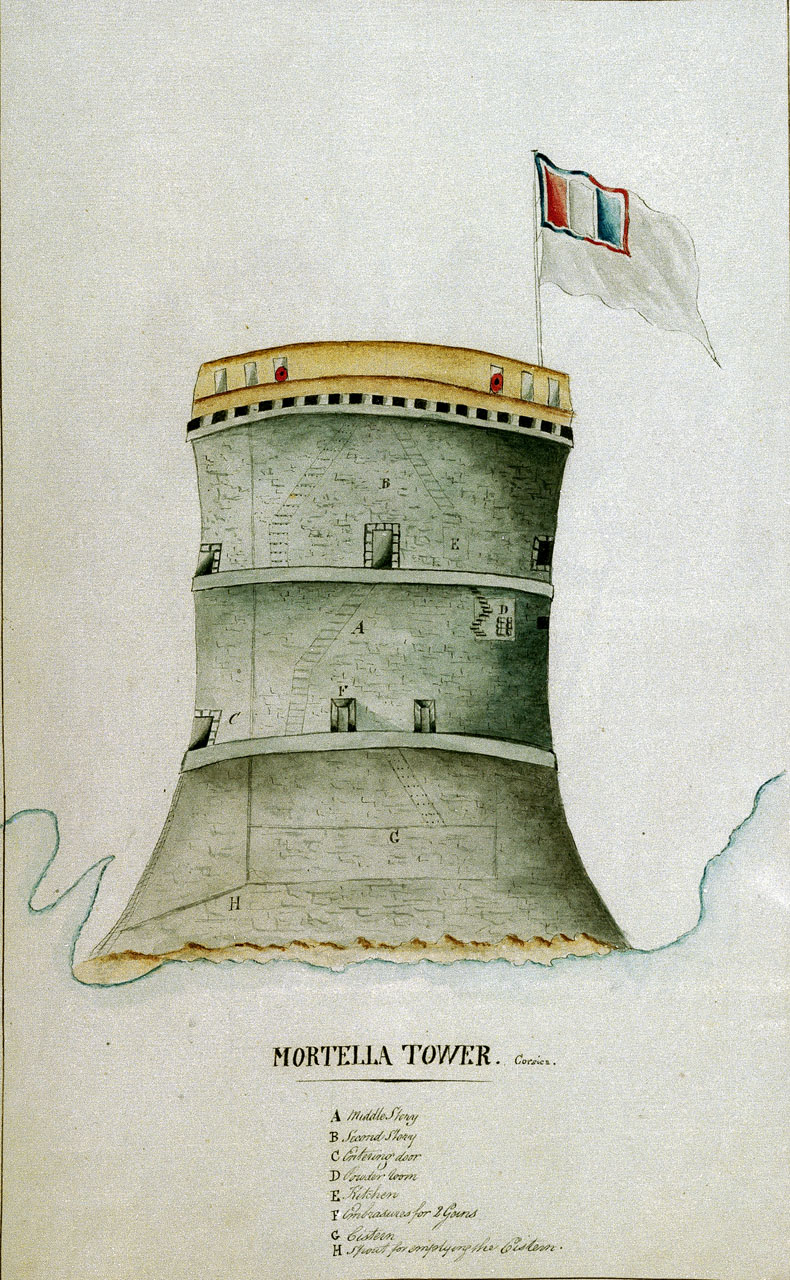
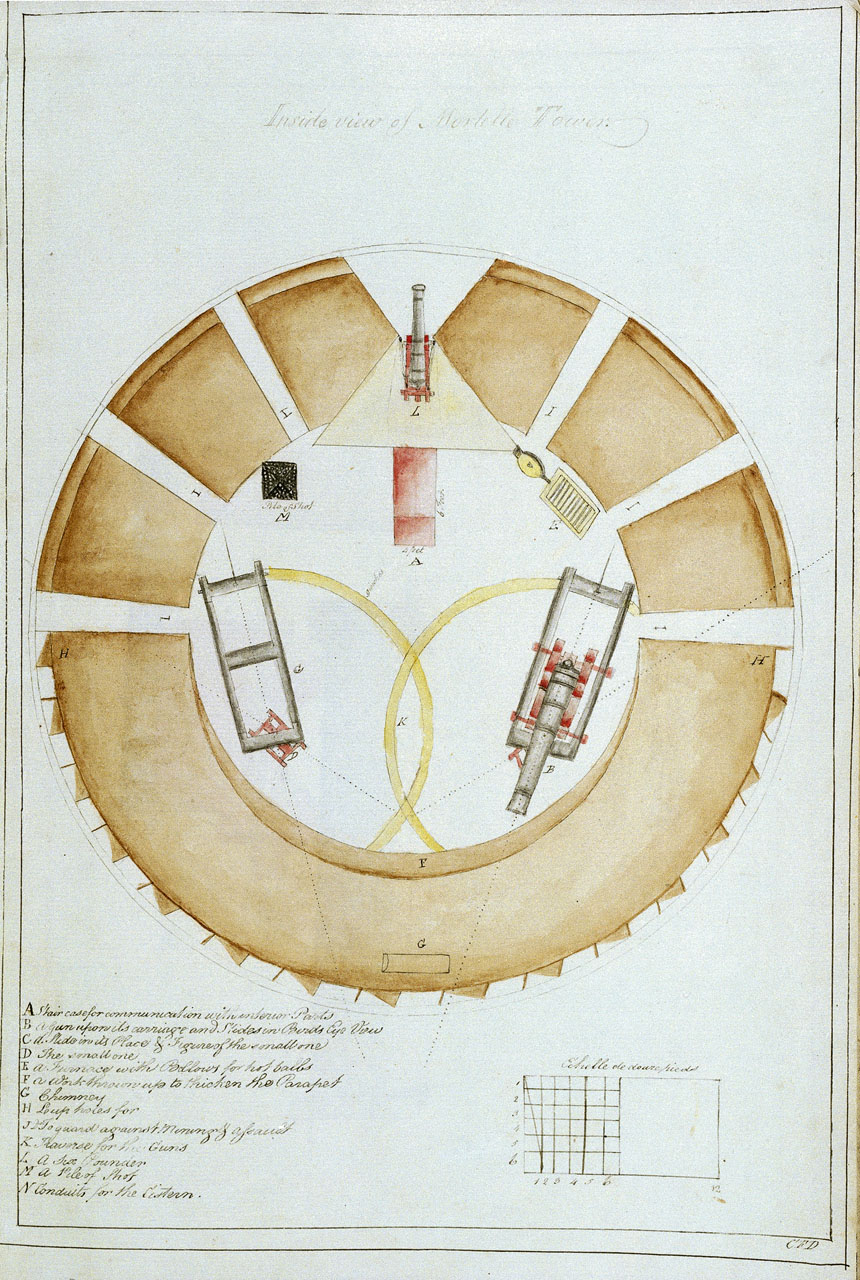
Plan and elevation of the tower. The artist was probably a British army officer. c. 1794.

== See also ==
- Martello Tower
- List of Genoese towers in Corsica
- Agriates Desert
