= Patrimonio (surname) =

Patrimonio is a Filipino surname that may refer to the following people:

- Alvin Patrimonio (born 1966), Filipino basketball player
- Anna Clarice Patrimonio (born 1993), Filipino tennis player
- Tin Patrimonio (born 1991), Filipino tennis player, model, actress and reality show contestant
