= Farinole =

Farinole Ferringule
- Commune
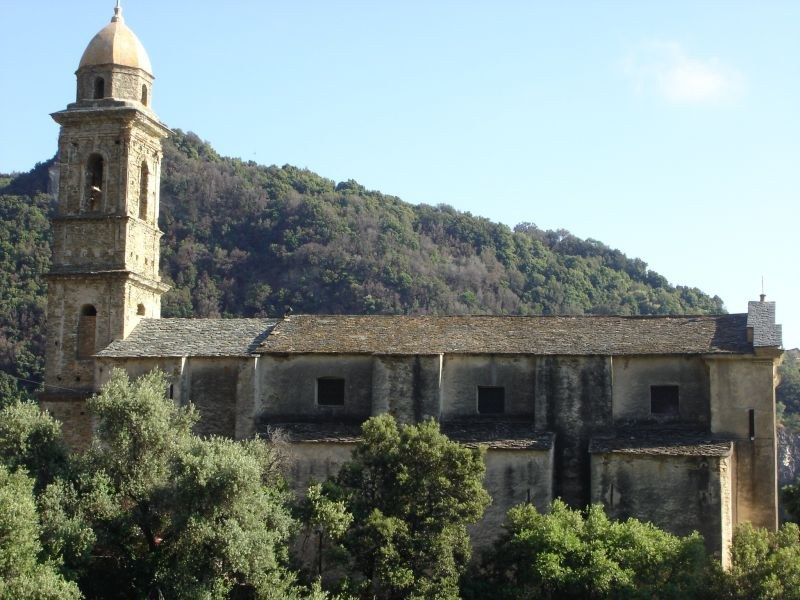
- The church in Farinole
- Location of Farinole
- Location within France Location within Corsica
- Coordinates: 42°43′58″N 9°21′58″E
- Country: France
- Region: Corsica
- Department: Haute-Corse
- Arrondissement: Calvi
- Canton: Cap Corse

Government
  - Mayor (2020–2026): Ange Cherubini
- Area^{1}: 14.76 km^{2} (5.70 sq mi)
- Elevation: 200 m (660 ft)
- Highest elevation: 1,120 m (3,670 ft)
- Lowest elevation: 0 m (0 ft)
- Population (2023): 236
  - Density: 16.0/km^{2} (41.4/sq mi)
- Time zone: UTC+01:00 (CET)
  - Summer (DST): UTC+02:00 (CEST)
- INSEE/Postal code: 2B109 /20253
- ^{1} French Land Register data, which excludes lakes, ponds, glaciers > 1 km^{2} (0.386 sq mi or 247 acres) and river estuaries.

Farinole (Corsican: Ferringule) is a commune in the Haute-Corse department of France on the island of Corsica.

The village is located between the mountains and the sea between Saint-Florent and Negro with the two hamlets of Sparagaggio and Bracolaccia. It has good views of the gulf and the Désert des Agriates. The village has two sandy beaches and a pebble beach.

== Population ==
Historical population
Year	Pop.	±% p.a.
1968	121	—
1975	131	+1.14%
1982	148	+1.76%
1990	176	+2.19%
1999	179	+0.19%
2007	210	+2.02%
2012	203	−0.68%
2017	228	+2.35%
2023	236	+0.58%
Source: INSEE

== See also ==
- Torra di Ferringule
- Communes of the Haute-Corse department
