= Oletta =

- Commune
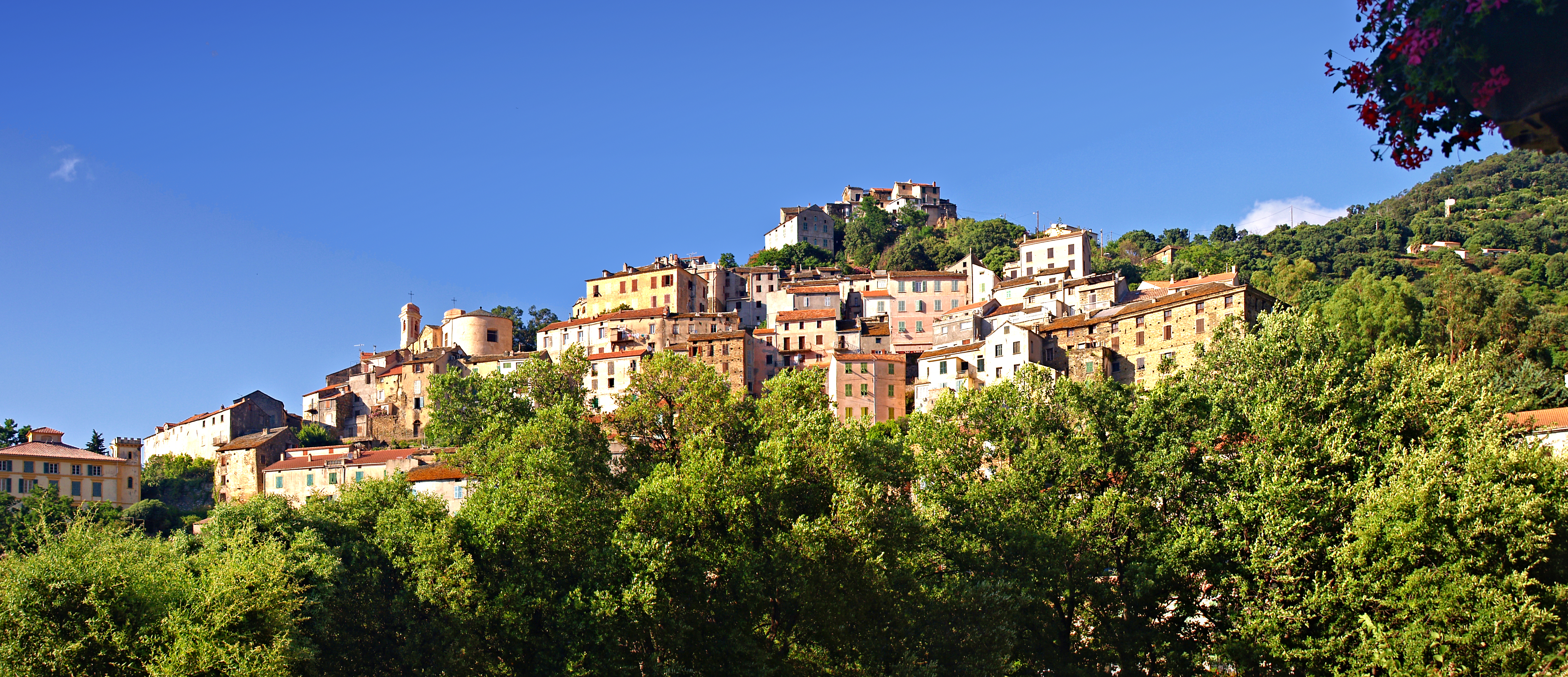
- A panoramic view of Oletta
- Location of Oletta
- Location within France Location within Corsica
- Coordinates: 42°38′00″N 9°21′22″E
- Country: France
- Region: Corsica
- Department: Haute-Corse
- Arrondissement: Calvi
- Canton: Biguglia-Nebbio

Government
  - Mayor (2020–2026): Jean-Pierre Leccia
- Area^{1}: 26.61 km^{2} (10.27 sq mi)
- Elevation: 250 m (820 ft)
- Highest elevation: 959 m (3,146 ft)
- Lowest elevation: 0 m (0 ft)
- Population (2023): 1,780
  - Density: 66.9/km^{2} (173/sq mi)
- Time zone: UTC+01:00 (CET)
  - Summer (DST): UTC+02:00 (CEST)
- INSEE/Postal code: 2B185 /20232
- ^{1} French Land Register data, which excludes lakes, ponds, glaciers > 1 km^{2} (0.386 sq mi or 247 acres) and river estuaries.

Oletta (French pronunciation: [ɔlɛta]) is a commune in the Haute-Corse department of France on the island of Corsica.

== Geography ==
=== Climate ===
Oletta has a hot-summer Mediterranean climate (Köppen climate classification Csa). The average annual temperature in Oletta is 15.7 °C (60.3 °F). The average annual rainfall is 757.3 mm (29.81 in) with November as the wettest month. The temperatures are highest on average in July, at around 24.0 °C (75.2 °F), and lowest in February, at around 8.7 °C (47.7 °F). The highest temperature ever recorded in Oletta was 40.1 °C (104.2 °F) on 1 August 2017; the coldest temperature ever recorded was −4.9 °C (23.2 °F) on 15 February 2012.

Climate data for Oletta (1991−2020 normals, extremes 2006−present)
Month	Jan	Feb	Mar	Apr	May	Jun	Jul	Aug	Sep	Oct	Nov	Dec	Year
Record high °C (°F)	21.8 (71.2)	23.8 (74.8)	26.5 (79.7)	27.6 (81.7)	34.5 (94.1)	38.4 (101.1)	39.1 (102.4)	40.1 (104.2)	36.5 (97.7)	31.5 (88.7)	25.6 (78.1)	22.7 (72.9)	40.1 (104.2)
Mean daily maximum °C (°F)	14.1 (57.4)	14.1 (57.4)	16.2 (61.2)	19.6 (67.3)	23.0 (73.4)	27.4 (81.3)	30.6 (87.1)	30.6 (87.1)	26.9 (80.4)	22.7 (72.9)	18.2 (64.8)	15.2 (59.4)	21.6 (70.9)
Daily mean °C (°F)	8.8 (47.8)	8.7 (47.7)	10.7 (51.3)	13.7 (56.7)	17.1 (62.8)	21.0 (69.8)	24.0 (75.2)	23.8 (74.8)	20.8 (69.4)	17.3 (63.1)	13.2 (55.8)	9.8 (49.6)	15.7 (60.3)
Mean daily minimum °C (°F)	3.5 (38.3)	3.3 (37.9)	5.3 (41.5)	7.9 (46.2)	11.1 (52.0)	14.7 (58.5)	17.3 (63.1)	17.1 (62.8)	14.8 (58.6)	11.9 (53.4)	8.2 (46.8)	4.5 (40.1)	10.0 (50.0)
Record low °C (°F)	−4.8 (23.4)	−4.9 (23.2)	−3.1 (26.4)	0.2 (32.4)	2.8 (37.0)	8.0 (46.4)	10.4 (50.7)	10.5 (50.9)	6.8 (44.2)	1.6 (34.9)	−2.4 (27.7)	−4.8 (23.4)	−4.9 (23.2)
Average precipitation mm (inches)	71.0 (2.80)	82.5 (3.25)	95.8 (3.77)	46.5 (1.83)	60.4 (2.38)	26.9 (1.06)	8.4 (0.33)	15.8 (0.62)	52.4 (2.06)	100.0 (3.94)	122.6 (4.83)	75.0 (2.95)	757.3 (29.81)
Average precipitation days (≥ 1.0 mm)	6.9	7.3	8.5	6.2	6.3	3.1	1.4	1.5	4.3	6.1	8.9	6.8	67.4
Source: Météo-France

== Population ==
Historical population
Year	Pop.	±% p.a.
1968	619	—
1975	692	+1.61%
1982	892	+3.69%
1990	879	−0.18%
1999	830	−0.64%
2007	1,282	+5.58%
2012	1,533	+3.64%
2017	1,696	+2.04%
2023	1,780	+0.81%
Source: INSEE

== See also ==
- Communes of the Haute-Corse department
