= Patrimonio =

- Commune
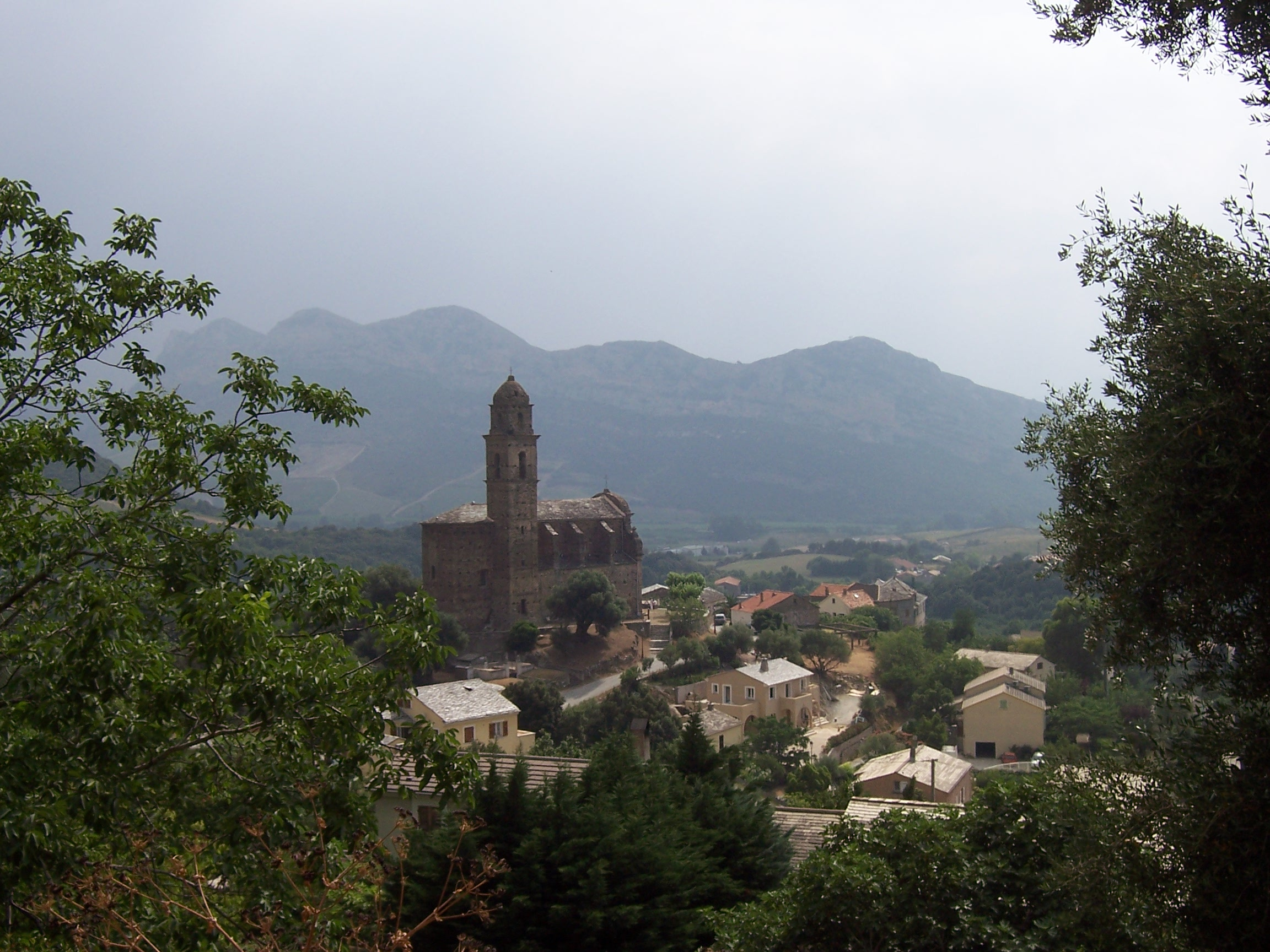
- The church and surrounding buildings in Patrimonio

- Coat of arms
- Location of Patrimonio
- Location within France Location within Corsica
- Coordinates: 42°41′54″N 9°21′44″E
- Country: France
- Region: Corsica
- Department: Haute-Corse
- Arrondissement: Calvi
- Canton: Cap Corse

Government
  - Mayor (2024–2026): Jean-Baptiste Arena
- Area^{1}: 17.46 km^{2} (6.74 sq mi)
- Elevation: 100 m (330 ft)
- Highest elevation: 1,025 m (3,363 ft)
- Lowest elevation: 0 m (0 ft)
- Population (2023): 897
  - Density: 51.4/km^{2} (133/sq mi)
- Demonym(s): French: Patrimonien.ne; Corsican: patrimunincu, Corsican: patrimuninca Italian: patrimoniese
- Time zone: UTC+01:00 (CET)
  - Summer (DST): UTC+02:00 (CEST)
- INSEE/Postal code: 2B205 /20253
- ^{1} French Land Register data, which excludes lakes, ponds, glaciers > 1 km^{2} (0.386 sq mi or 247 acres) and river estuaries.

Patrimonio (Italian pronunciation: [patriˈmɔːnjo]; French: [patʁimɔnjo]; Corsican: Patrimoniu, [patriˈmɔnju]) is a commune in the French department of Upper Corsica, collectivity and island of Corsica.

The inhabitants are known as patrimoniens and patrimoniennes in French, patrimuninchi (singular: patrimunincu, patrimuninca) in Corsican, and patrimoniesi (singular: patrimoniese) in Italian.

== Geography ==
Located 12 km from Bastia and 4 km from the micro-region of Saint-Florent, this wine-growing commune is the gateway to the Cap Corse (peninsula at the northernmost point of Corsica).

== History ==
The village of Patrimonio is known for the quality of its AOC (quality-controlled designation of origin) wines and for its guitar nights. The festival lasts for a week.

== Population ==
Historical population
Year	Pop.	±% p.a.
1968	393	—
1975	397	+0.14%
1982	447	+1.71%
1990	546	+2.53%
1999	645	+1.87%
2007	667	+0.42%
2012	689	+0.65%
2017	807	+3.21%
2023	897	+1.78%
Source: INSEE

== Sights ==
- A menhir (or standing stone) found in a vine in 1964 by two labourers, the Gilormini brothers from Patrimonio. (The menhir is called "U Nativu".)
- St. Martin's Church (San Martinu)
- The small Santa Maria chapel

== See also ==
- Communes of the Haute-Corse department
