= Santo-Pietro-di-Tenda =

Santo Pietro di Tenda Santu Pietru di Tenda
- Commune
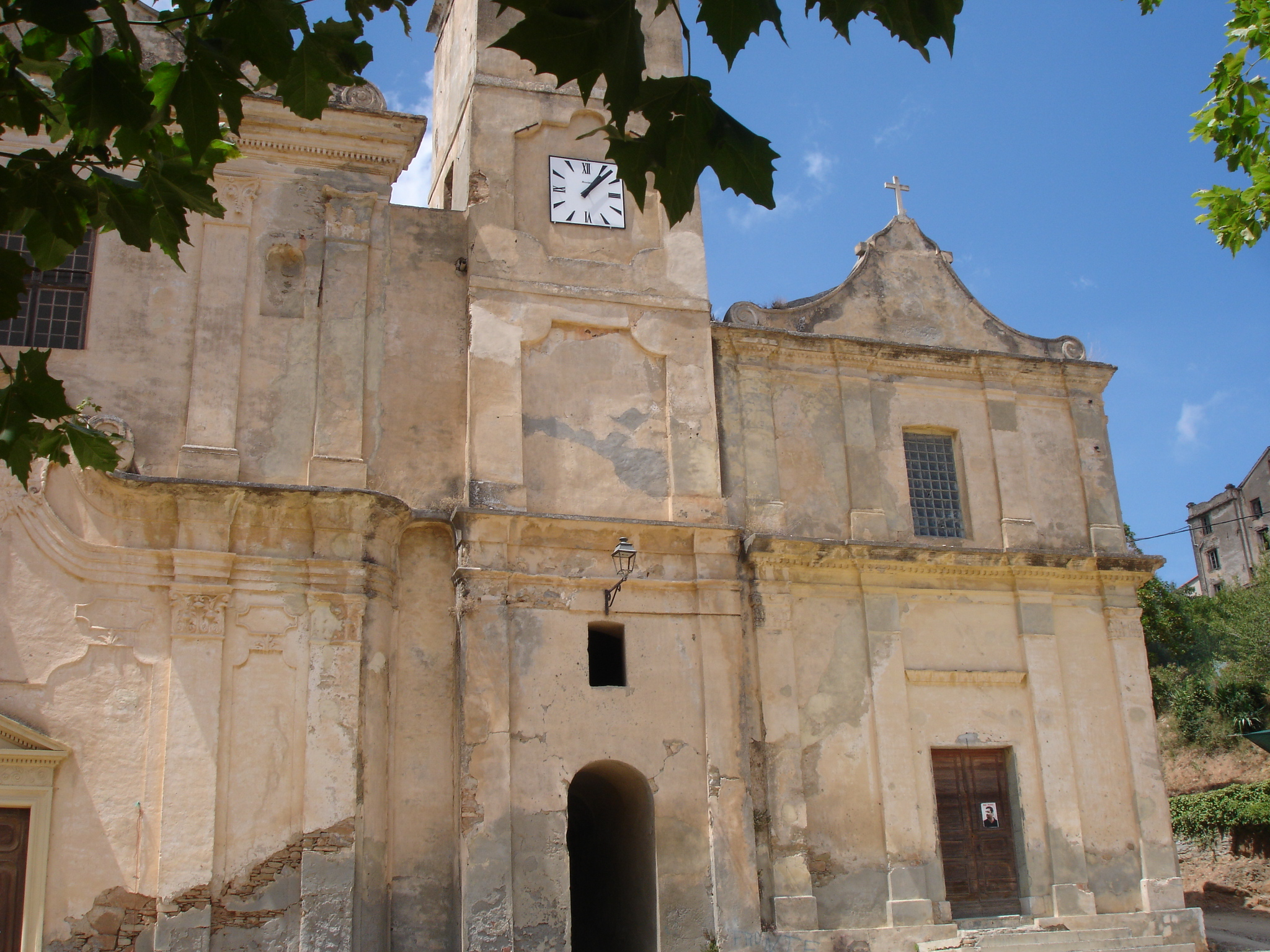
- The church in Santo-Pietro-di-Tenda
- Location of Santo Pietro di Tenda
- Location within France Location within Corsica
- Coordinates: 42°36′17″N 9°15′22″E
- Country: France
- Region: Corsica
- Department: Haute-Corse
- Arrondissement: Calvi
- Canton: Biguglia-Nebbio

Government
  - Mayor (2020–2026): Marc Tomi
- Area^{1}: 125.66 km^{2} (48.52 sq mi)
- Highest elevation: 869 m (2,851 ft)
- Lowest elevation: 0 m (0 ft)
- Population (2023): 341
  - Density: 2.71/km^{2} (7.03/sq mi)
- Time zone: UTC+01:00 (CET)
  - Summer (DST): UTC+02:00 (CEST)
- INSEE/Postal code: 2B314 /20246
- ^{1} French Land Register data, which excludes lakes, ponds, glaciers > 1 km^{2} (0.386 sq mi or 247 acres) and river estuaries.

Santo-Pietro-di-Tenda (French form) or Santo Pietro di Tenda (Italian form; Corsican: Santu Petru di Tenda, also Santu Pietru) is a French commune in the Haute-Corse department on the island of Corsica.

== Population ==
Historical population
Year	Pop.	±% p.a.
1968	540	—
1975	316	−7.37%
1982	286	−1.41%
1990	291	+0.22%
1999	332	+1.48%
2007	334	+0.08%
2012	356	+1.28%
2017	361	+0.28%
2023	341	−0.95%
Source: INSEE

== See also ==
- Communes of the Haute-Corse department
