= Poggio-d'Oletta =

- Commune
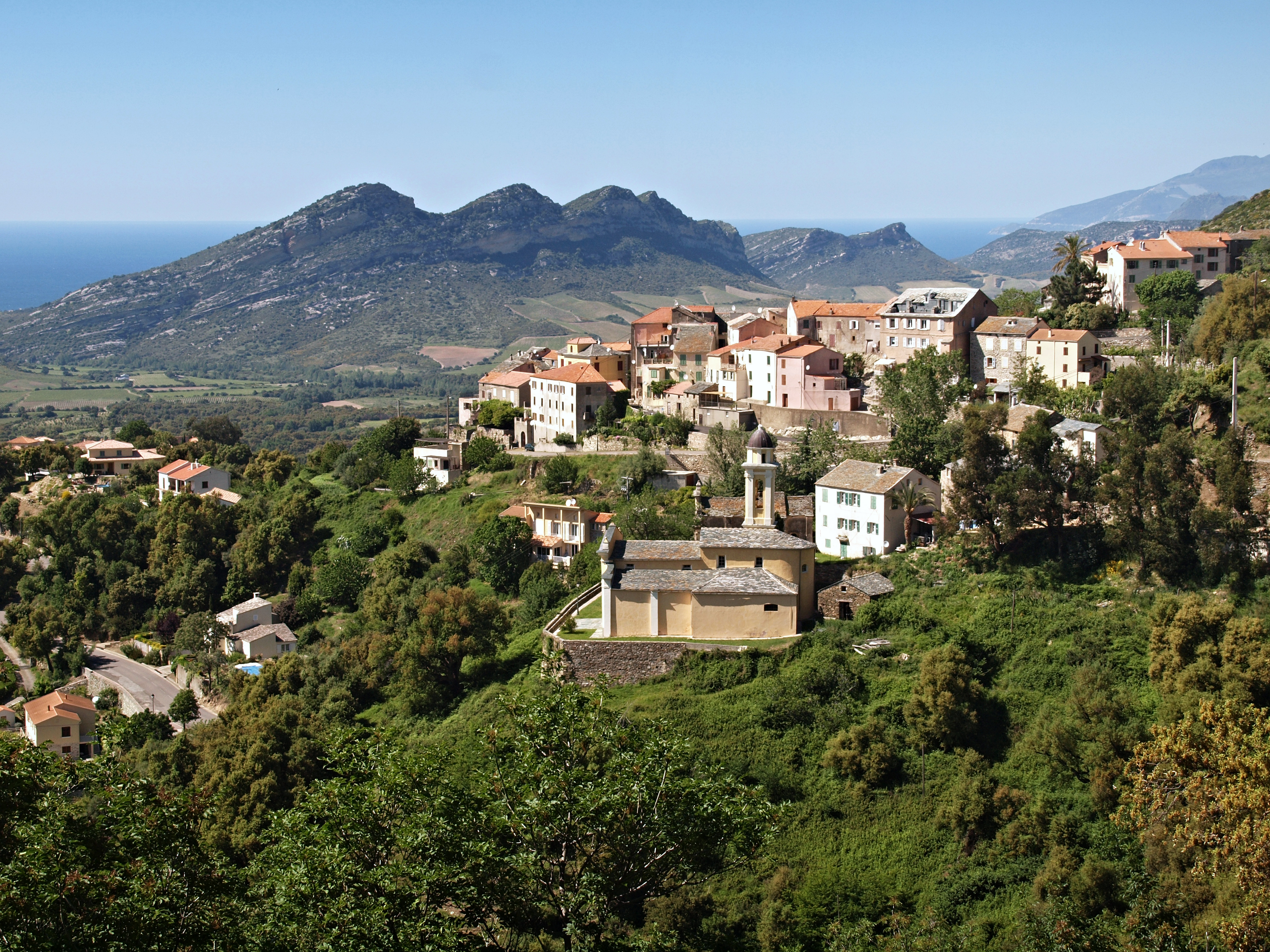
- The church of San Cervone and the surrounding buildings, in Poggio-d'Oletta
- Location of Poggio-d'Oletta
- Location within France Location within Corsica
- Coordinates: 42°38′25″N 9°21′47″E
- Country: France
- Region: Corsica
- Department: Haute-Corse
- Arrondissement: Calvi
- Canton: Biguglia-Nebbio

Government
  - Mayor (2020–2026): Antoine Vincenti
- Area^{1}: 16.16 km^{2} (6.24 sq mi)
- Elevation: 350 m (1,150 ft)
- Highest elevation: 852 m (2,795 ft)
- Lowest elevation: 0 m (0 ft)
- Population (2023): 215
  - Density: 13.3/km^{2} (34.5/sq mi)
- Time zone: UTC+01:00 (CET)
  - Summer (DST): UTC+02:00 (CEST)
- INSEE/Postal code: 2B239 /20232
- ^{1} French Land Register data, which excludes lakes, ponds, glaciers > 1 km^{2} (0.386 sq mi or 247 acres) and river estuaries.

Poggio d'Oletta (Italian form; Corsican: U Poghju d'Oletta) or Poggio-d'Oletta (French form), is a commune in the Haute-Corse department of France on the island of Corsica.

== Population ==
Historical population
Year	Pop.	±% p.a.
1968	155	—
1975	142	−1.24%
1982	125	−1.81%
1990	109	−1.70%
1999	140	+2.82%
2007	223	+5.99%
2012	204	−1.77%
2017	213	+0.87%
2023	215	+0.16%
Source: INSEE

== See also ==
- Communes of the Haute-Corse department
