= Col de Sainte-Marie (Corsica) =

Mountain pass in Corsica, France

- Bocca di Santa Maria (Corsican)
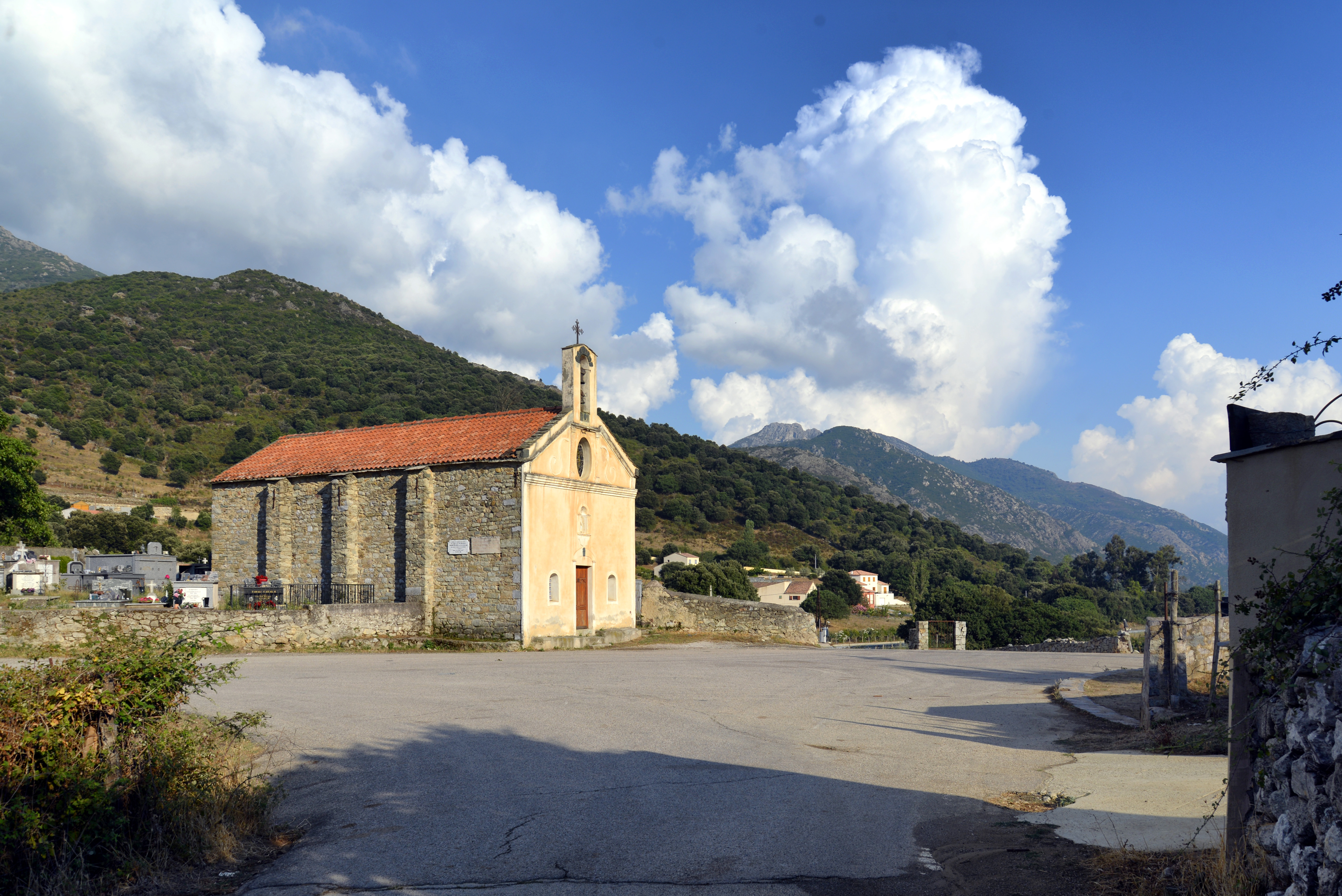
- Santa Maria Assunta at the Col de Sainte-Marie

- Location within Corsica Location within France
- Elevation: 472 metres (1,549 ft)

Third Approach
- Range: Monte Astu Massif, Monte Cinto Massif
- Coordinates: 42°32′20″N 9°11′01″E

The Col de Sainte-Marie (Corsican: Bocca di Santa Maria) or Col de Pietralba is a mountain pass in the Haute-Corse department of Corsica, France. It is between the Monte Astu Massif to the east and the Monte Cinto Massif to the west. It leads from the Ostriconi valley to the northwest to the Tartagine valley, which leads to the east coast.

== Location ==
The Col de Sainte-Marie is at an elevation of 372 metres (1,220 ft). It is in the commune of Pietralba, just south of the village of Pietralba. The T30 highway runs through the pass. It runs from L'Île-Rousse along the northeast coast, then turns inland and runs up the Ostriconi river valley to the pass. At the pass the D8 road from Urtaca and Lama to the north crosses the T30. To the south the roads follow the valley of the Ravin de Santa Maria, and then the Ruisseau de Lagani down to its convergence with the Tartagine river. The T20 continues south to Corte.

The church of Santa Maria Assunta at the pass is probably an old pièvane church dated from the 10th century that has been remodeled. Its small bell tower contains some sculpted greenschist stones representing human heads, silhouettes of birds and quadrupeds that date from the pre-Romanesque period.

== Geology ==
The Col de Sainte-Marie is on a fracture line of the central depression oriented from the northwest to the southeast. Northeast of the depression is the Monte Astu Massif, where ancient granites and gneisses outcrop. Southwest of the depression is the Balagne, consisting of an oceanic thrust sheet as the westernmost part of the "Eastern Alpine Corsica", which is formed of metamorphic sediments and ophiolites on a crystalline base.

== History ==
The Col de Sainte-Marie has been an important military strategic passage for centuries. Fortifications were built on each side to guard and defend the passage. The most important was the Castellu di Lumisgiana at an altitude of 600 metres (2,000 ft) east of the pass.

In 1554, during the war between the French and the Genoese in Corsica, Marc´ Antonio Ceccaldi, a staunch supporter of the Genoese, was taken prisoner at the Bocca di Tenda by Sampiero Corso, the Marshal of Thermes. He wrote, "Giacomo Santo arrived first at the church of S. Maria de Pietr´Alba with his cavalry, and at once seized the baggage of the Genoese army that was at its head. But Brancadoro arrived at the church, had his troops halted, put them into battle, immediately regained the baggage, and the skirmish lasted a while.

== Sources ==
- Ceccaldi, Marc' Antonio, "Chronique", Histoire de la Corse, vol. II, translated by Abbé Letteron
- "Les églises piévanes de Corse de l'époque romaine au Moyen Âge, La question de Pietralba", Cahiers Corsica, 158–159, 1993
- Monti, Antoine Dominique (1979), "La grande révolte des Corses contre Gênes 1729-1769", Chronologie, Cervione: ADECEC
- "Node: Col de Sainte-Marie (8983502485)", OpenStreetMap
- "Santa Maria", géoportail
