= Cima di e Follicie =

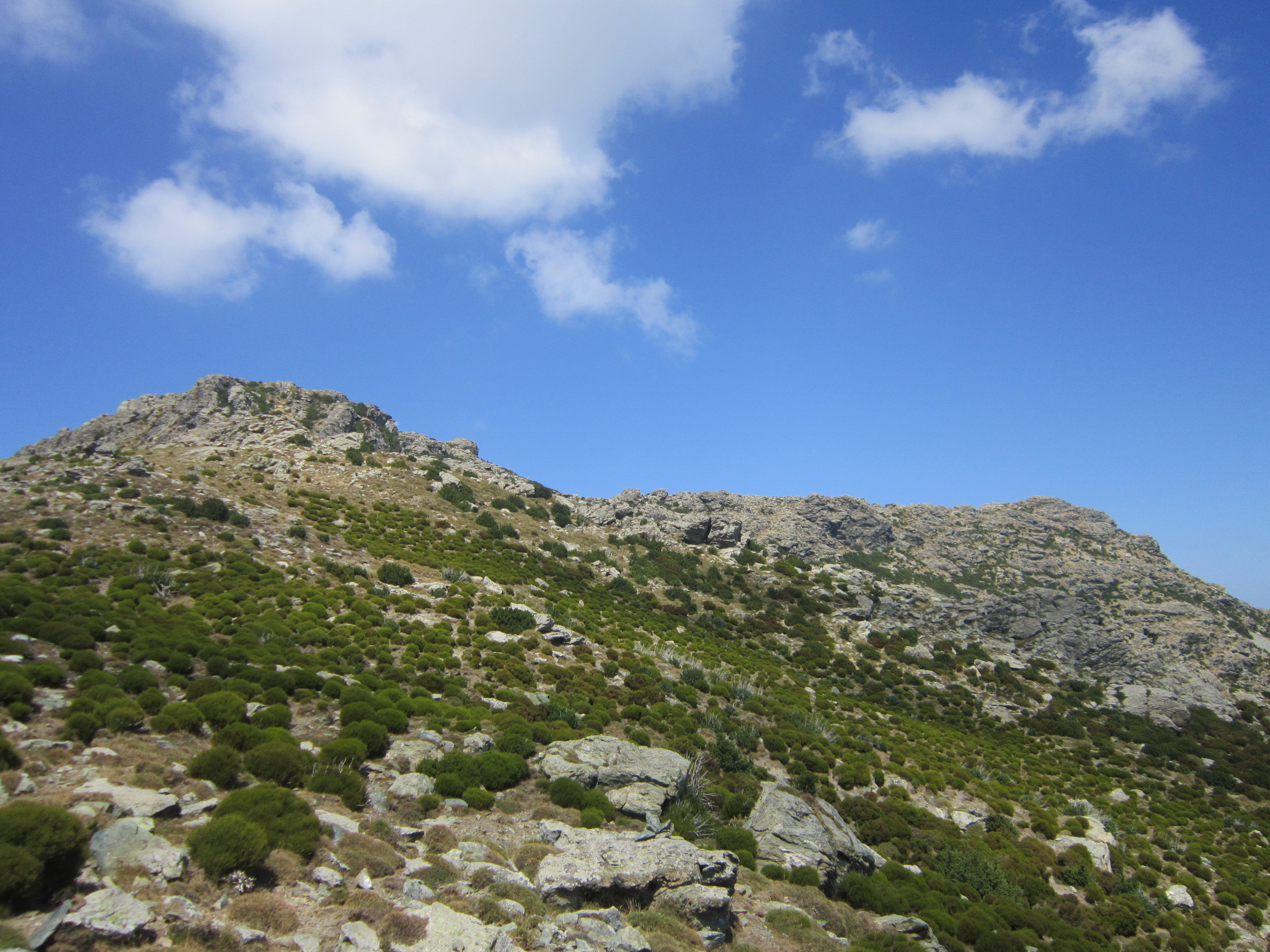
- View of the summit

Highest point
- Elevation: 1,324 m (4,344 ft)
- Prominence: 956 m (3,136 ft)
- Parent peak: Monte Asto
- Isolation: 29.21 km (18.15 mi)
- Coordinates: 42°49′41″N 9°23′09″E

Geography
- Location within Corsica
- Country: France
- Department: Haute-Corse

Geology
- Formed by: Fold and thrust belt
- Orogeny: Alpine orogeny
- Rock age: Cretaceous
- Rock type: Ophiolite

Cima di e Follicie is a mountain in the department of Haute-Corse on the island of Corsica, France. It is in the Monte Stello Massif on Cap Corse.

== Location ==
The peak of Cima di e Follicie is just northeast of the intersection of the boundaries of the communes of Olcani to the south, Ogliastro to the west and Sisco to the east. It is southeast of the village of Canari and west of the town of Sisco.

== Physical ==
Cima di e Follicie has a prominence of 956 metres (3,136 ft) and an elevation of 1,324 metres (4,344 ft). It is isolated by 29.21 kilometres (18.15 mi) from Monte Asto to the south-southwest. It is the highest peak in the Monte Stello Massif, surpassing Monte Stello by 18 metres (59 ft). It looks over the Albo beach and Canelle point to the west and the sea around Sisco to the east.

Cime di e Follicie consists of Cretaceous ophiolites that were formed during the Alpine orogeny.

== Hiking ==
The hike from the village of Olcani climbs for almost 1,000 metres (3,300 ft). At first it follows a track that was meant to cross the cape but has never been paved, which climbs steeply at times to a small chapel in the San Giovanni pass, from where the track leads on to Sisco. A marked path leads towards the Pruberzulu rock, and from there to the summit.

== Gallery ==
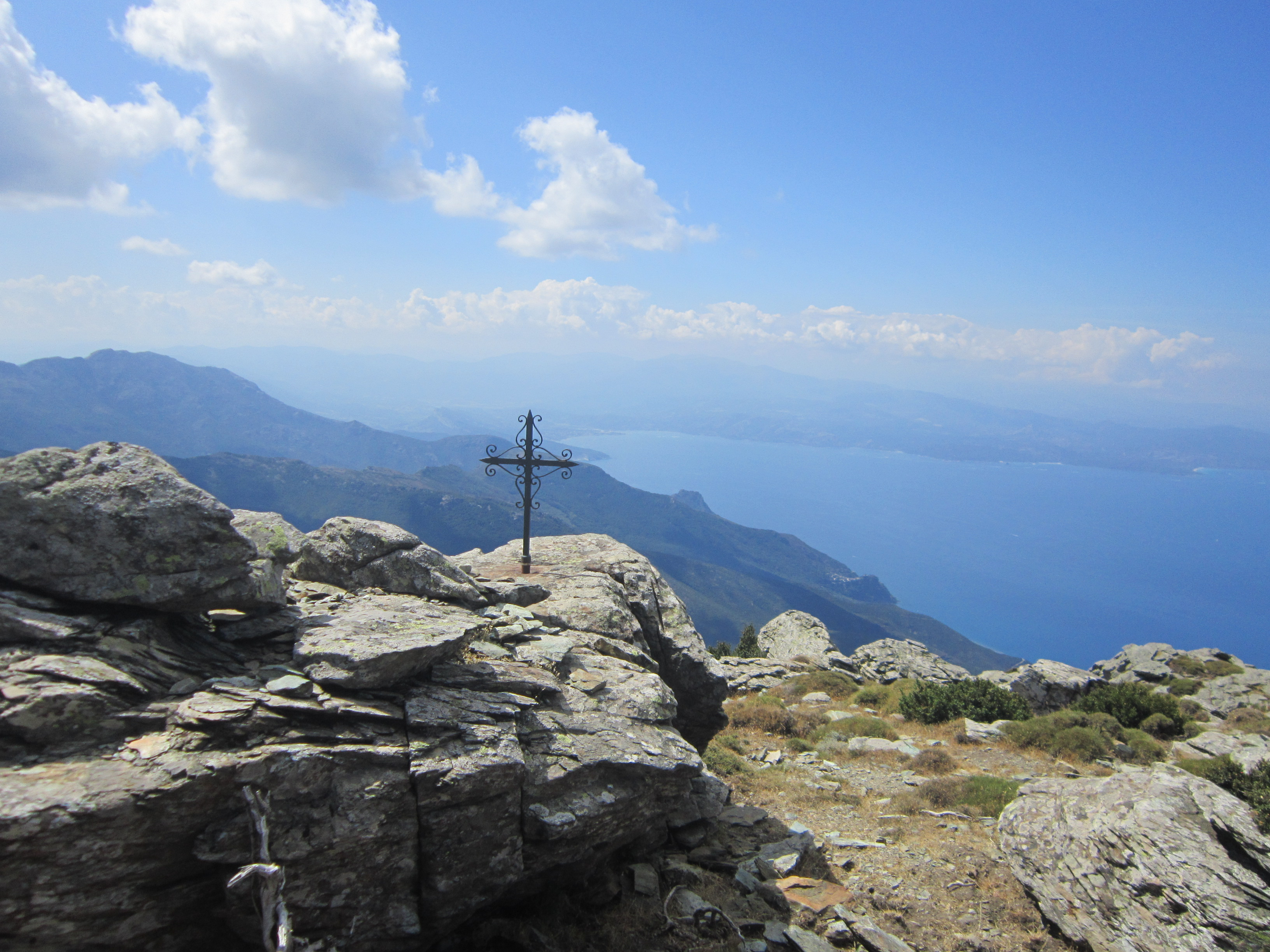
Cross on the "false summit"

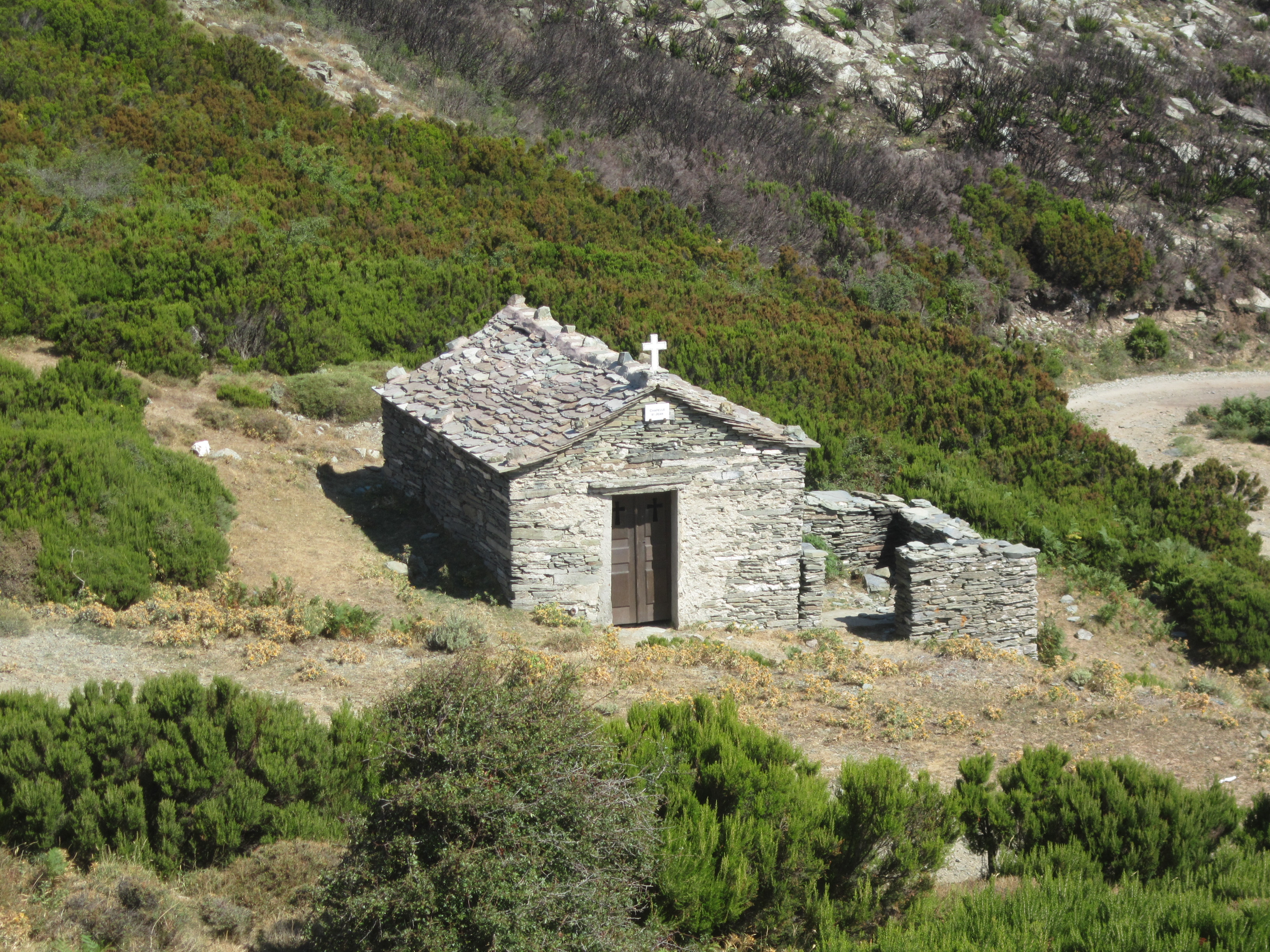
Chapel of San Ghjuvà in Buca di San Ghjuvà

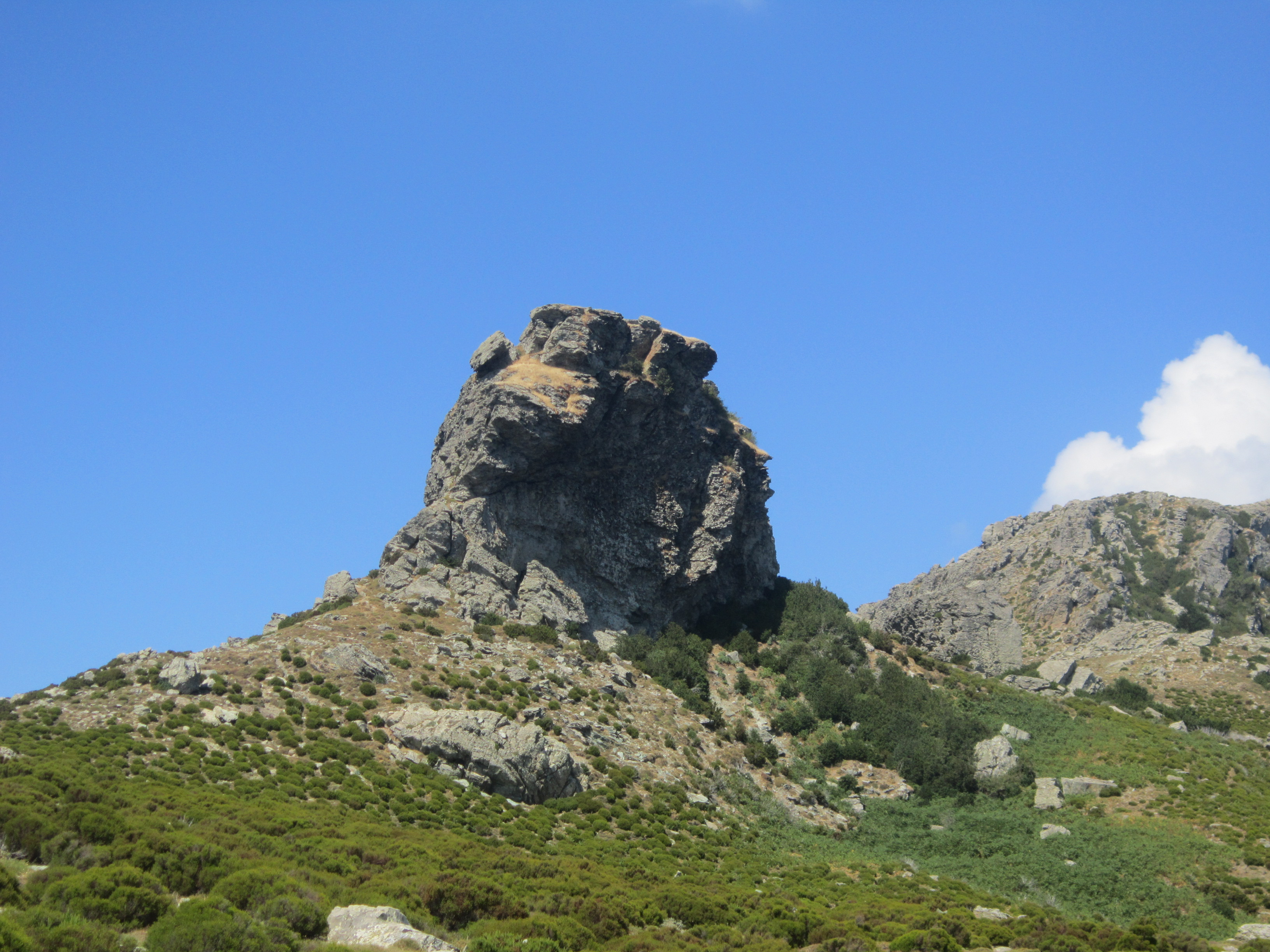
Pruberzulu rock on route up towards Cima di e Follicie

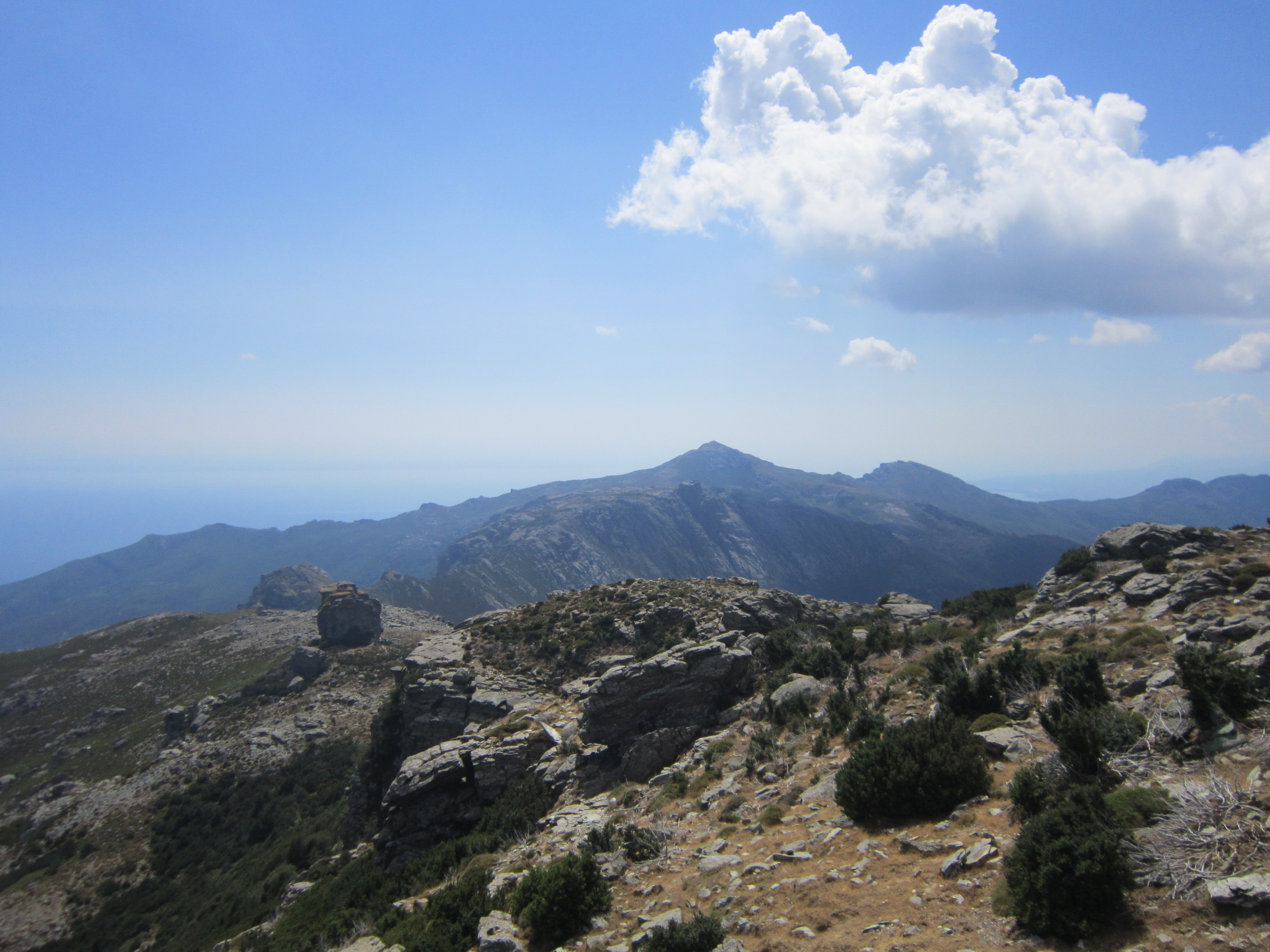
Monte Stello seen from Cima di e Follicie

== Sources ==
- "Atlas thématique de la Corse. BASTIA 1/50.000." (PDF), brgm.rf (in French), BRGM - Service Géologique Régional Bastia, 1996
- "Cima di e Follicie 1322m", Label-Rando (in French)
- "Cima di e Follicie, France", Peakbagger
- "Les 7 massifs corses", Corse Location Villa (in French)
- "Node: Cima di e Follicie (26862699)", OpenStreetMap
