= Monte Astu Massif =

Chain of mountains in France

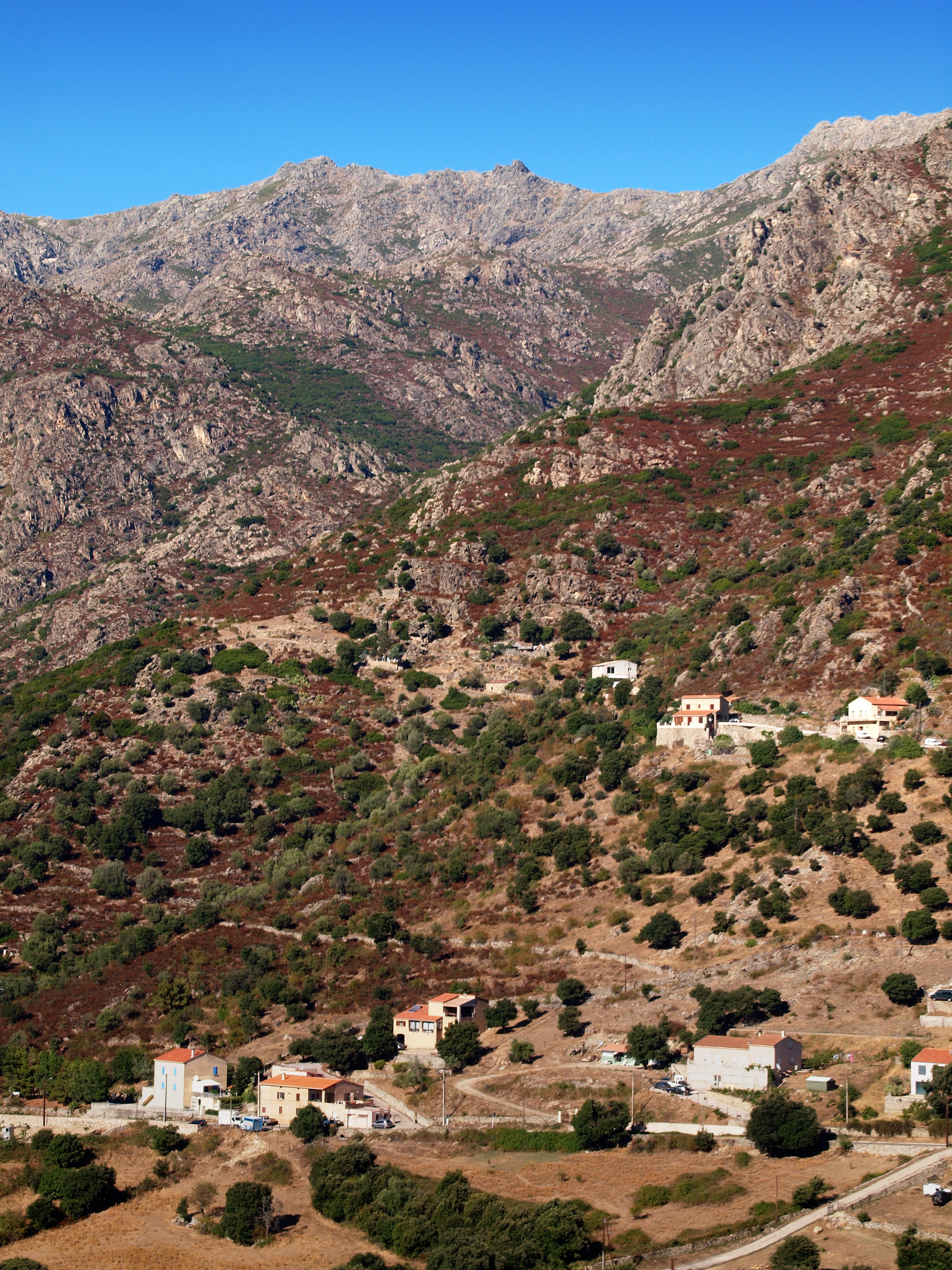
- Monte Astu above Pietralba

Highest point
- Peak: Monte Astu
- Elevation: 1,535 m (5,036 ft)
- Coordinates: 42°49′41″N 9°23′9″E

Geography
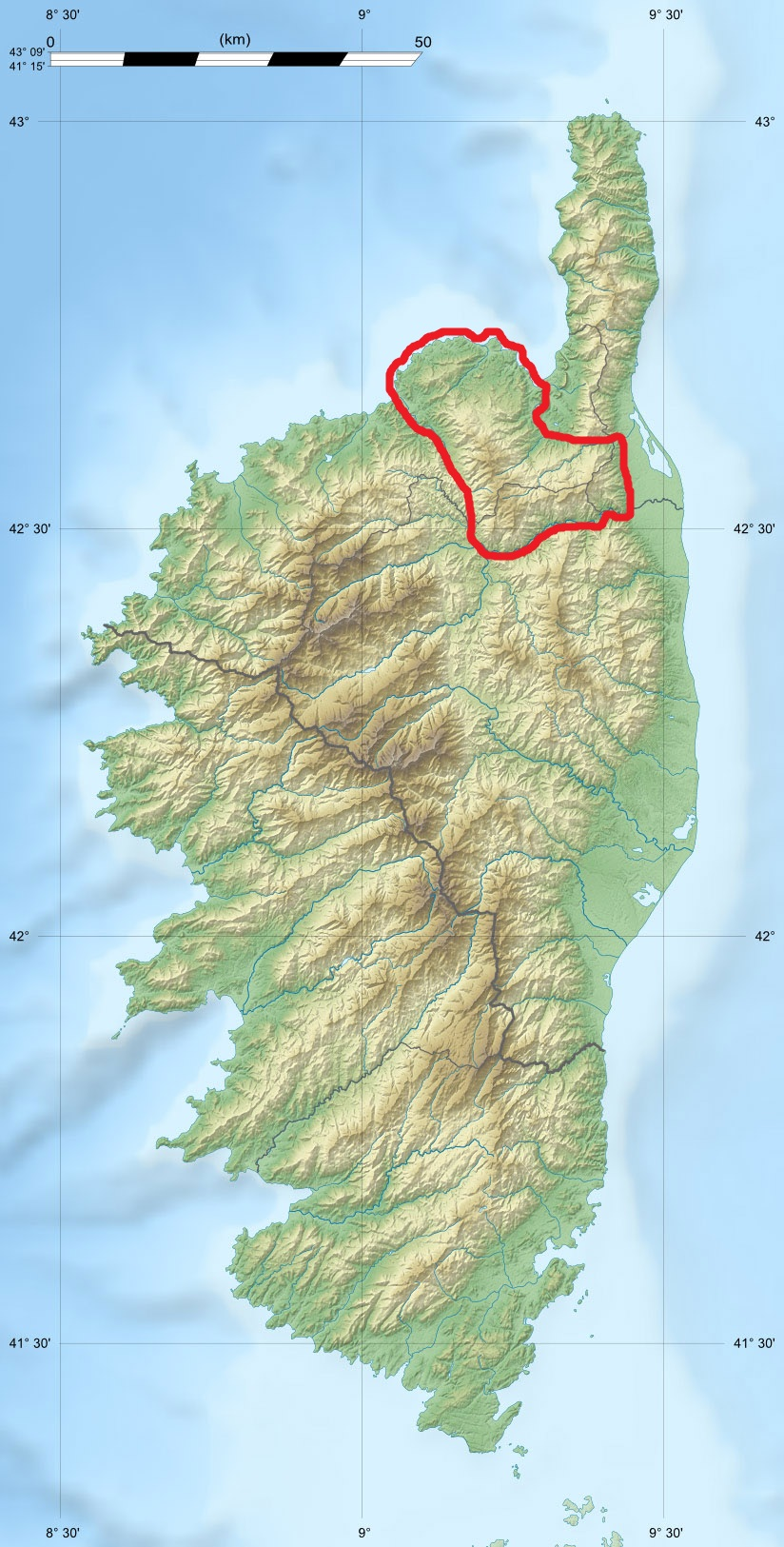
- Location: Haute-Corse, Corsica, France

The Monte Astu Massif (French: Massif du Monte Astu) is a chain of mountains in the northeast of the island of Corsica, France. It takes its name from Monte Astu, the highest peak.

== Location ==
The Monte Astu Massif has a main chain, the Serra di Tenda, and two secondary chains. The Serra di Tenda has all the highest peaks in the massif. It separates the Nebbio from the Ostriconi valley.

Part of the massif covering 6,159 hectares (15,220 acres) has been designated a Zone naturelle d'intérêt écologique, faunistique et floristique (ZNIEFF). Elevations range from 400 to 1,535 metres (1,312 to 5,036 ft). The ZNIEFF extends along the ridge from Monte Filetto (842 m) to the Rocher de Pietrapolo (1104 m). This main chain changes direction at Monte Tassu, where a secondary ridge line oriented to the north emerges, comprising Monte Maggiore (1102 m) and Monte Pietrapolo (1104 m). The main ridge line has eight peaks that exceed 1,100 m: Cima di Grimaseta: 1,509 metres (4,951 ft), Monte Asto: 1,535 metres (5,036 ft), Cima to i Muzzelli: 1,299 metres (4,262 ft), Punta di Paganella: 1,426 metres (4,678 ft), Monte Reghia di Pozzo: 1,469 metres (4,820 ft), Monte Sant'Angelo: 1,389 metres (4,557 ft), Monte Tassu: 1,372 metres (4,501 ft), Rocher de Pietrapolo: 1,104 metres (3,622 ft).

== Peaks ==
The main peaks are,

Name	Elevation		Prominence	
Name	meters	feet	meters	feet
Monte Astu	1,535	5,036	1,063	3,488
Petra San Ghiaccu	1,512	4,961	0	0
Cima di Grimaseta	1,509	4,951	0	0
Monte Reghia di Pozzo	1,469	4,820	0	0
Punta di Paganella	1,426	4,678	0	0
Monte Sant' Angelo (Monte Sant' Anghiuli)	1,389	4,557	0	0
Monte Tassu	1,372	4,501	0	0
Cima a i Muzzelli	1,299	4,262	0	0
Monte d'Oltari	1,290	4,230	0	0
Monte di L'Alturaia	1,271	4,170	0	0
Monte Tevisi	1,150	3,770	0	0
Monte Pruno	1,150	3,770	0	0
Monte Ambrica	1,063	3,488	0	0

== Hydrography ==
The western part of the Monte Astu Massif is drained to the north by the Aliso which flows into the Gulf of Saint-Florent and to the south by the Ostriconi. The streams from the eastern sector flow either into the Bevinco (to the north) or into the Golo (to the south).

== Gallery ==
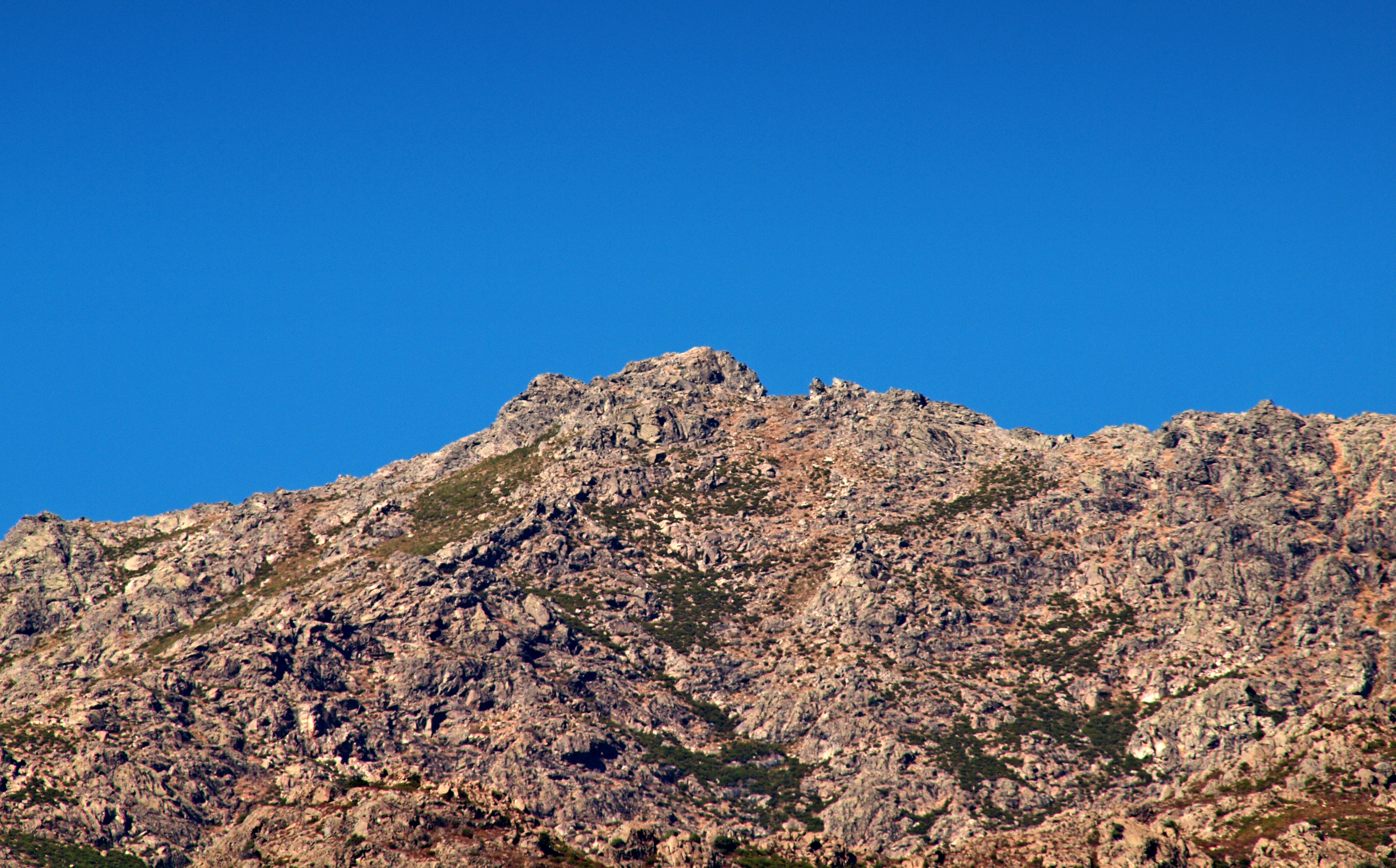
The peak of Monte Astu

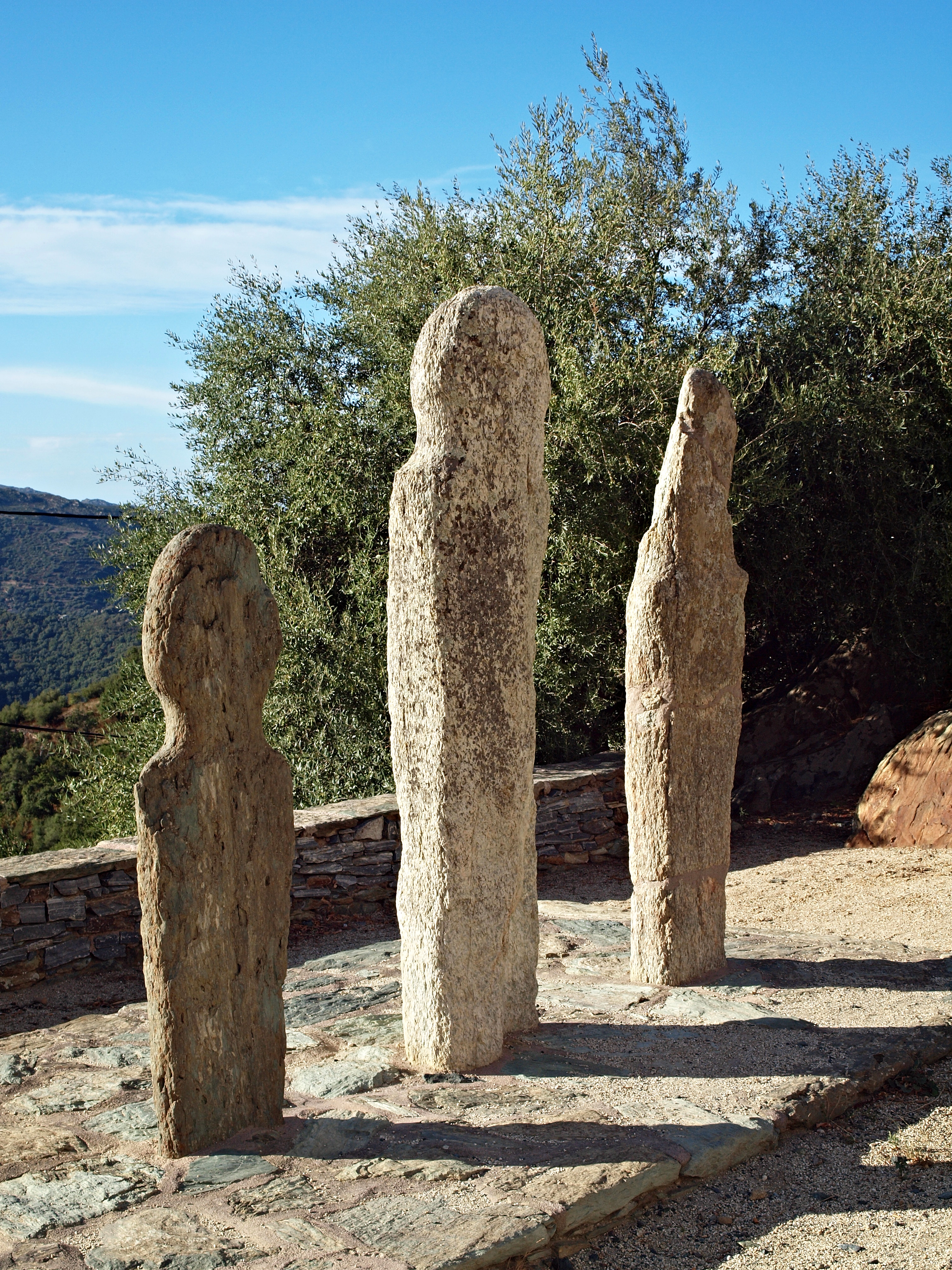
Three menhirs in front of the church of San Quilico, Piève, Nebbio

== Sources ==
- "ZNIEFF 940013187 Massif du Tenda et Monte Astu", Inventaire national du patrimoine naturel (INPN) (in French)
