= Philousports =

French internet personality (1971–2021)

- Born: Philippe Vignolo; 3 October 1971; Marseille, France
- Died: 19 June 2021 (aged 49); Pietracorbara, France
- Occupation: Influencer

Philippe Vignolo, known as Philousports (3 October 1971 – 19 June 2021) was a French internet personality. He was best known for his GIFs and sports commentary on Twitter since April 2011, where he had over 260,000 followers. He suffered from myopathy and had been using a wheelchair since the age of nine.

== Biography ==
Vignolo was born in 1971 in Marseille and began living with a host family in Corsica in 2014. In 2016, he started gaining popularity for his coverage of Ligue 1, in which several clubs enabled him to buy a wheelchair. In 2018, his Twitter account was suspended due to a crackdown on Ligue 1 for the production of GIFs, which sparked outrage.

In 2019, Vignolo published his autobiography, Moi, Philousports, with Hachette.

Philippe Vignolo died of a heart attack in Pietracorbara on 19 June 2021. Minister of France Roxana Mărăcineanu, Kylian Mbappé, André-Pierre Gignac, Fabien Galthié, Allan Saint-Maximin and many others paid tribute to him.

== Publications ==
- Philousports (2019). Moi, Philousports : [la biographie inédite de Philousports, le Zidane du Gif]. Mickaël. Grall. Vanves. ISBN 978-2-01-704695-0. OCLC 1134669940.
