= Pietracorbara (stream) =

River in France

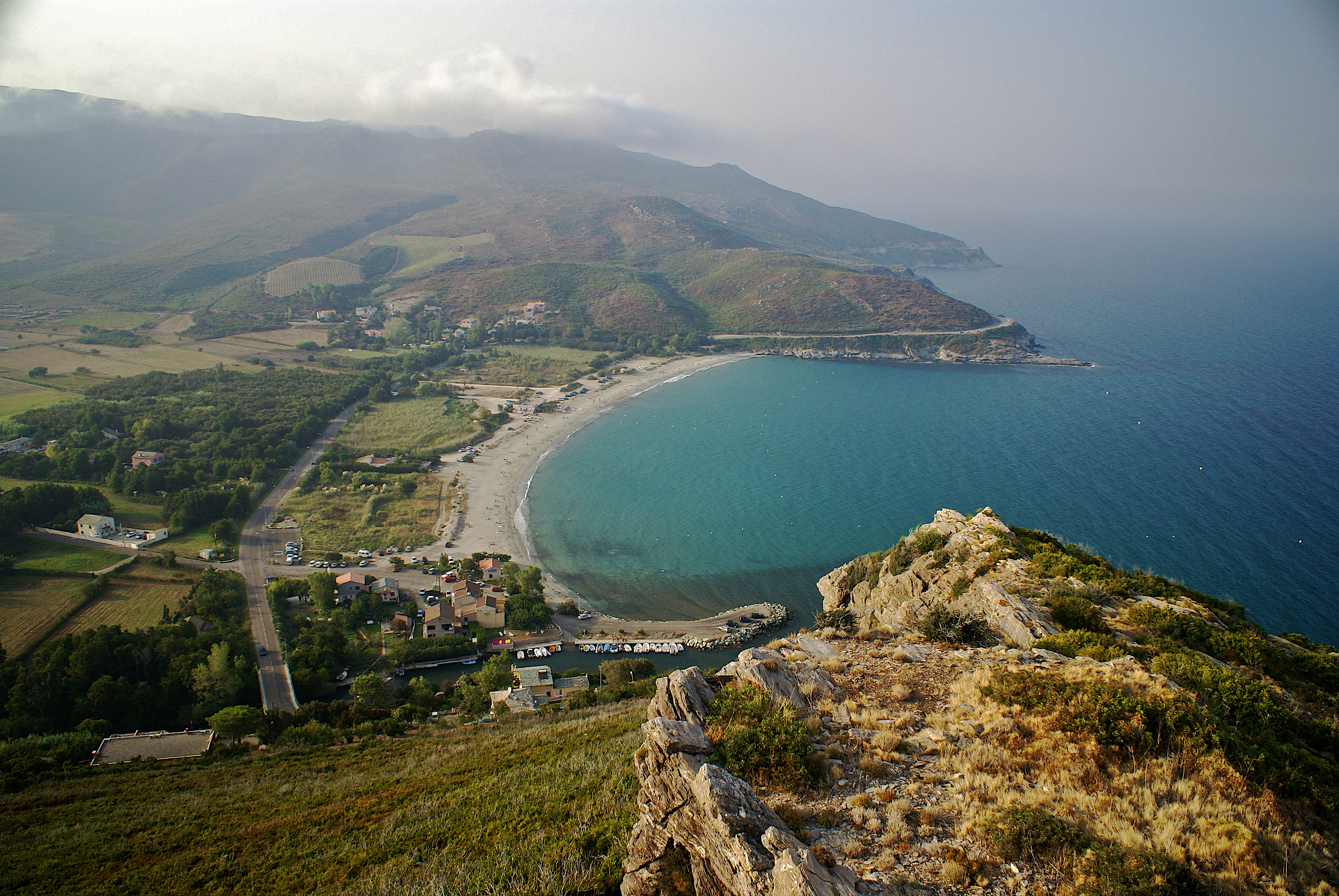
- Mouth of the river in the Pietracorbara Marine

- Location within Corsica Location within France

Location
- Country: France
- Region: Corsica
- Department: Haute-Corse

Physical characteristics
- Mouth: Tyrrhenian Sea
  - coordinates: 42.8357°N 9.4802°E

The Ruisseau de Pietracorbara is a coastal stream in the department of Haute-Corse, Corsica, France. It rises in the Monte Stello Massif on Cap Corse and flows into the Tyrrhenian Sea on the east of the island.

== Course ==
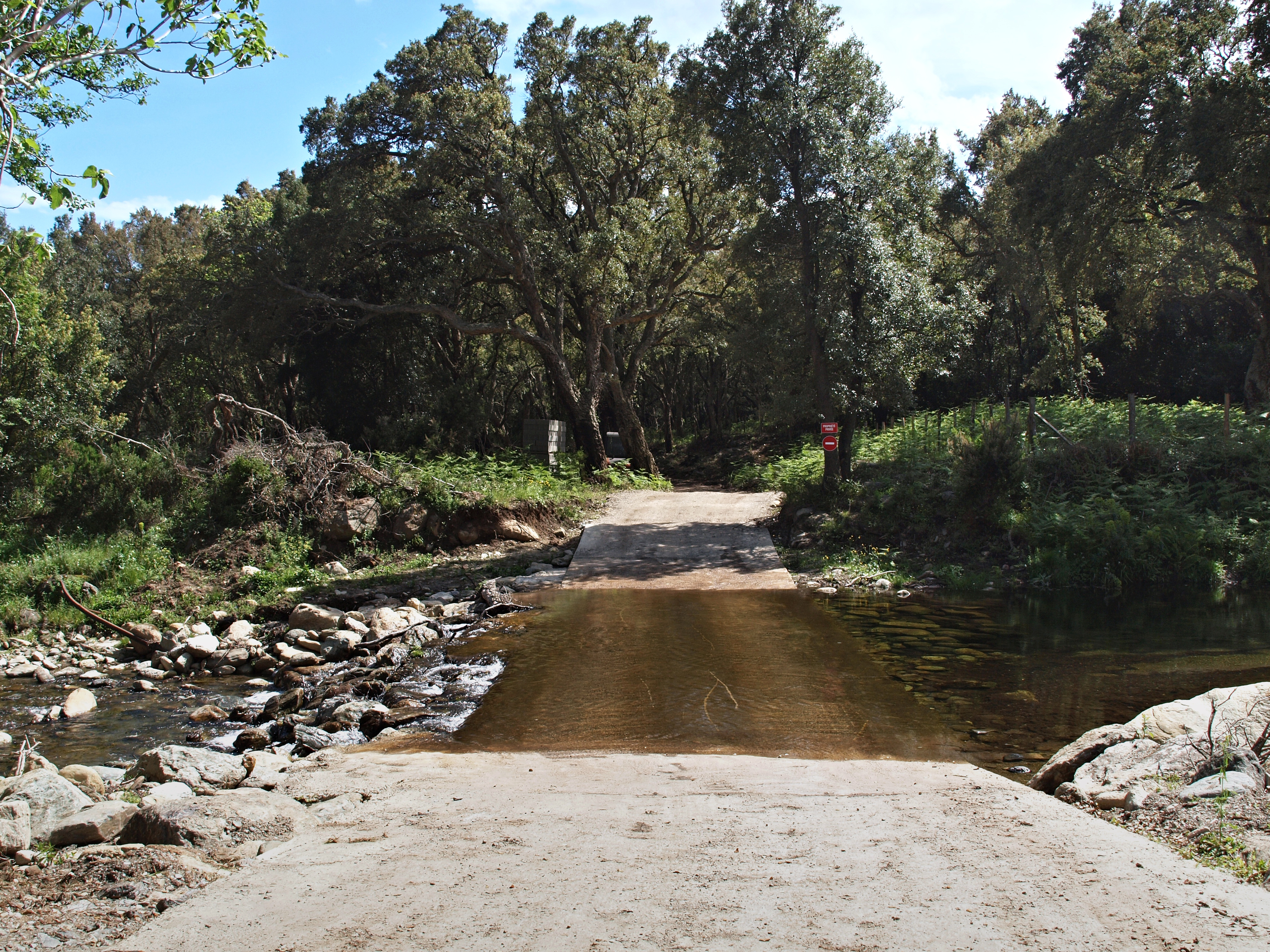
Ford over the stream at Quarciola

The Pietracorbara is 9.45 kilometres (5.87 mi) long. It crosses the communes of Pietracorbara and Sisco. The stream rises in the Sisco commune to the northeast of the 1,236 metres (4,055 ft) Rocher de Pruberzulu and east of the 1,324 metres (4,344 ft) Cima di e Follicie. It flows north into the Pietracorbara commune, then east past the village of Pietracorbara to enter the sea at the Marine de Pietracorbara. The D232 road follows the river from Pietracorbara to the sea.

== Bridges ==
There are three stone bridges over the stream that are said to have been built in the Genoese period (1289–1730). The Quercetu bridge is in the plain and is the sturdiest of the three. The Ponticellu, or "little bridge", is at the height of the hamlet of the same name. The arched bridge adjoins an arched fountain, and is architecturally the most interesting of the three. The Guadubughju ("dark stream") bridge is at the top of the valley near the hamlet of Selmacce, and spans the stream near the only deep swimming pool on its course.

== Tributaries ==
The following streams (ruisseaux) are tributaries of the Pietracorbara (ordered by length) and sub-tributaries:

- Fiore 3 km (1.9 mi)
  - Faulu 1 km (0.62 mi)
- Quarcetu 3 km (1.9 mi)
- Stagnone 3 km (1.9 mi)
- Olmo 3 km (1.9 mi)
  - Muligna 1 km (0.62 mi)
- Piscine 2 km (1.2 mi)
- Acolaja 1 km (0.62 mi)

== Sources ==
- Il suffit de passer les ponts… (in French), Pietracorbara
- "Relation: Ruisseau de Pietracorbara (9417722)", OpenStreetMap
- "Ruisseau de Pietracorbara", Sandre
