= Monte Astu =

Mountain in Corsica, France

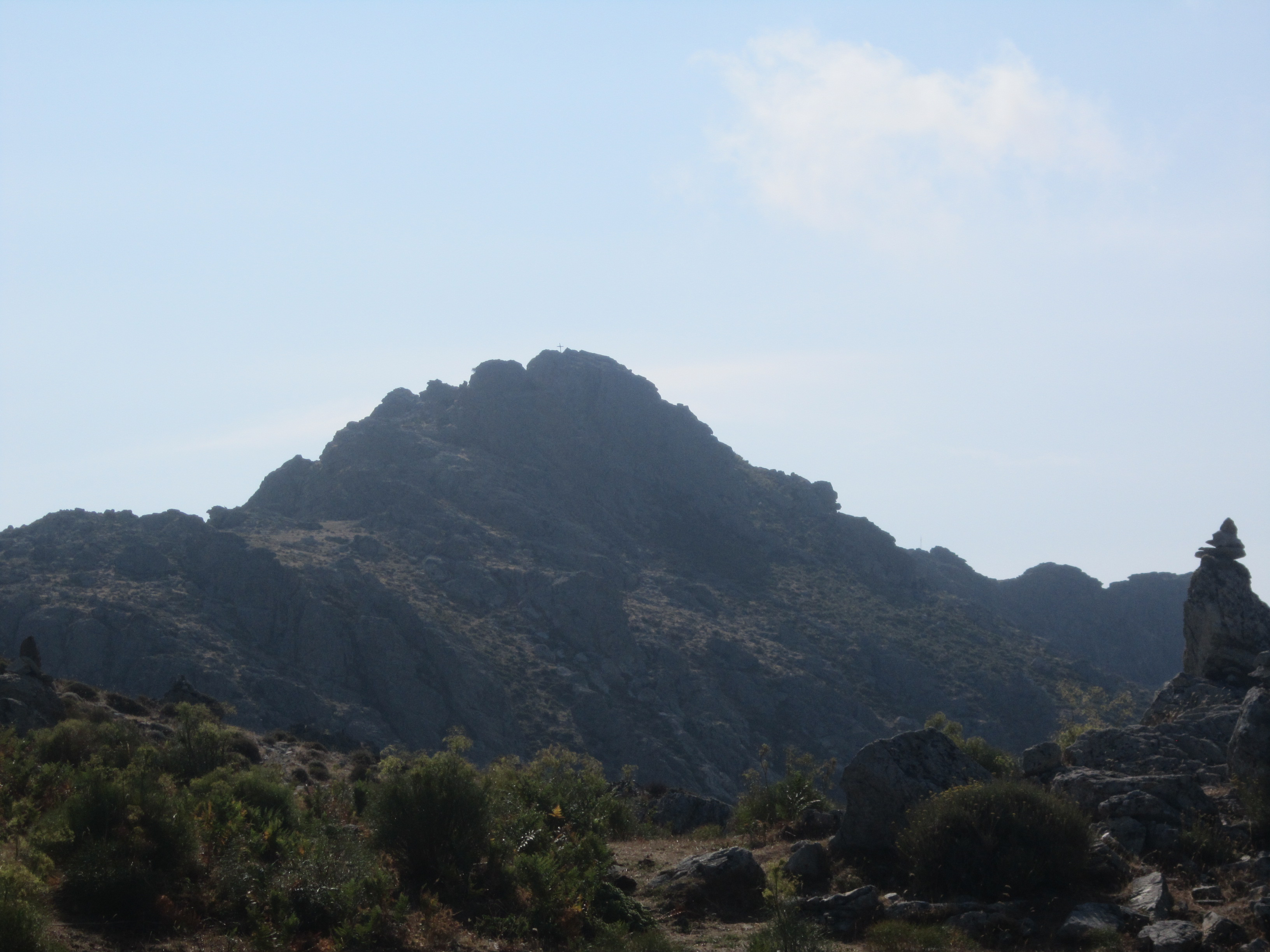
- Monte Astu

Highest point
- Elevation: 1,535 m (5,036 ft)
- Prominence: 1,071 m (3,514 ft)
- Isolation: 17.95 km (11.15 mi)
- Listing: Mountains of Corsica, Ribu
- Coordinates: 42.5812°N 9.2100°E

Geography
- Location within Corsica
- Country: France
- Department: Haute-Corse

Monte Astu or Monte Asto is a mountain in the department of Haute-Corse on the island of Corsica, France.

== Location ==
The peak is on the border between the communes of Lama and Sorio. It is to the east of the D8 road from Pietralba via Lama to Urtaca. It is the highest point of a ridge that includes the 1,509 metres (4,951 ft) Cima di Grimaseta and 1,512 metres (4,961 ft) Petra San Ghiaccu to the south and the 1,371 metres (4,498 ft) Monte a l'Alturaia, 1,299 metres (4,262 ft) Cima a Muzzelli and 1,063 metres (3,488 ft) Monte Ambrica to the north. Another ridge runs eastward through the 1333 Monti di Peru, 1042 A Genucula and 717 Croce d'Aculaghja to San-Gavino-di-Tenda. The Fiume di Gargalagne, a tributary of the Ostriconi, drains the west of the ridge. Streams from the southeast of the ridge feed the Fiumi Raghiunti, the upper section of the Aliso River.

== Physical ==
Monte Asto has an elevation of 1,535 metres (5,036 ft) and clean prominence of 1,063 metres (3,488 ft). It is isolated by 17.96 kilometres (11.16 mi) from its nearest higher neighbour, Cima a i Mori to the south of southwest.

Monte Astu is the highest point in the Tenda massif between Saint-Florent and L'Île-Rousse in Haute-Corse. This is a granitic mole partially detached from its mica schist encasement which still remains on its periphery and on its roof.

== Hiking ==
The route to the summit from Lama is 12.8 kilometres (8.0 mi) there and back, with a vertical of 1,043 metres (3,422 ft). It is considered difficult, and takes about six hours. The path winds through Corsican maquis shrubland along a marked path past the Refuge de Prunincu to the ridge overlooking the Puleghio ravine. ffA small climb across riprap is needed to reach the summit, not advised for people with vertigo.

From the summit there is a panorama over northern Corsica, including the Agriates Desert, the Monte Cinto massif, Cap Corse and the Tuscan Archipelago. The view includes the eastern plain, the Saint-Florent bay to the north and L'Île-Rousse to the west.

== Gallery ==
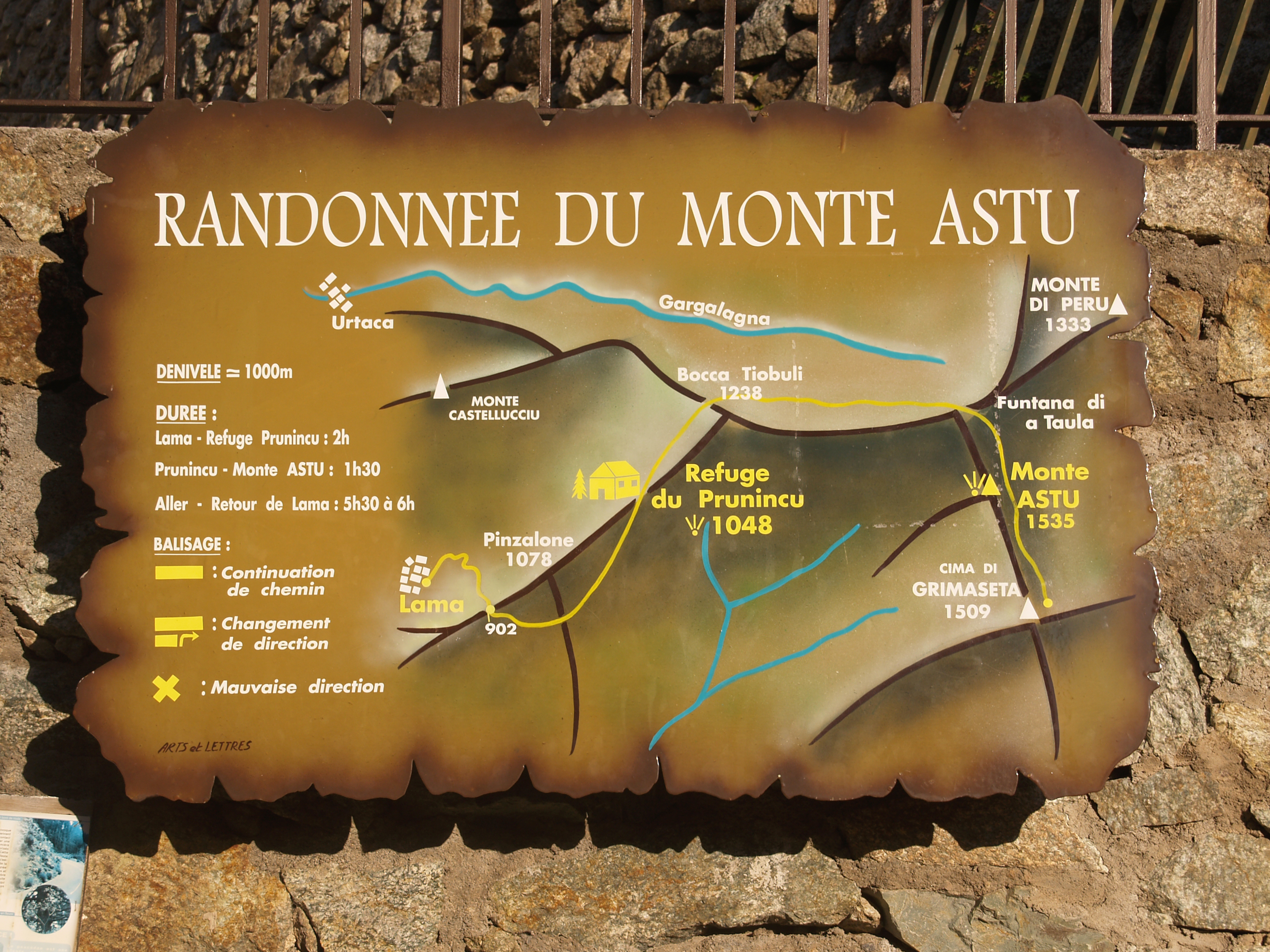
Hiking trail sign

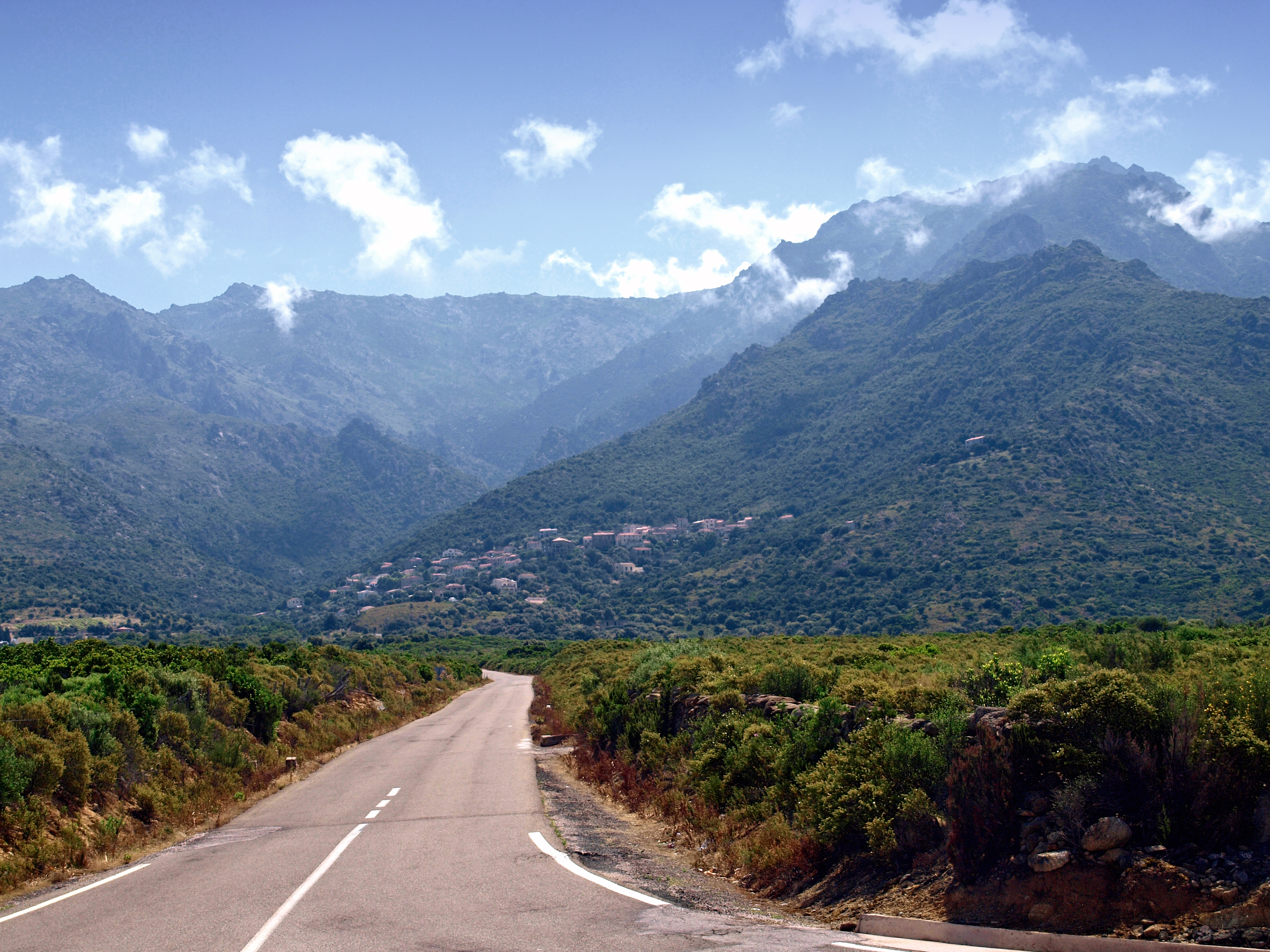
Urtaca, Monte Astu

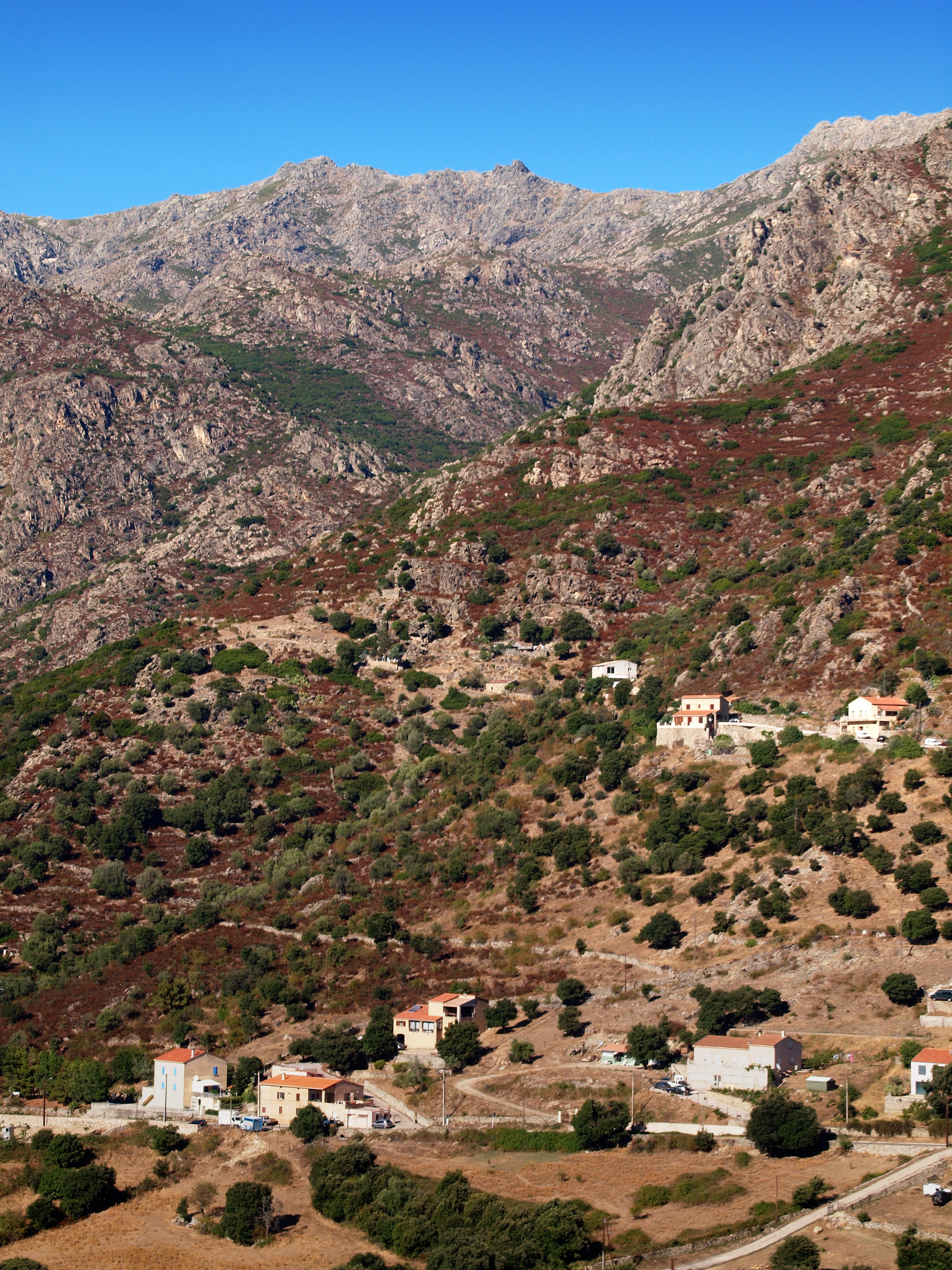
Pietralba, Monte Astu to the left

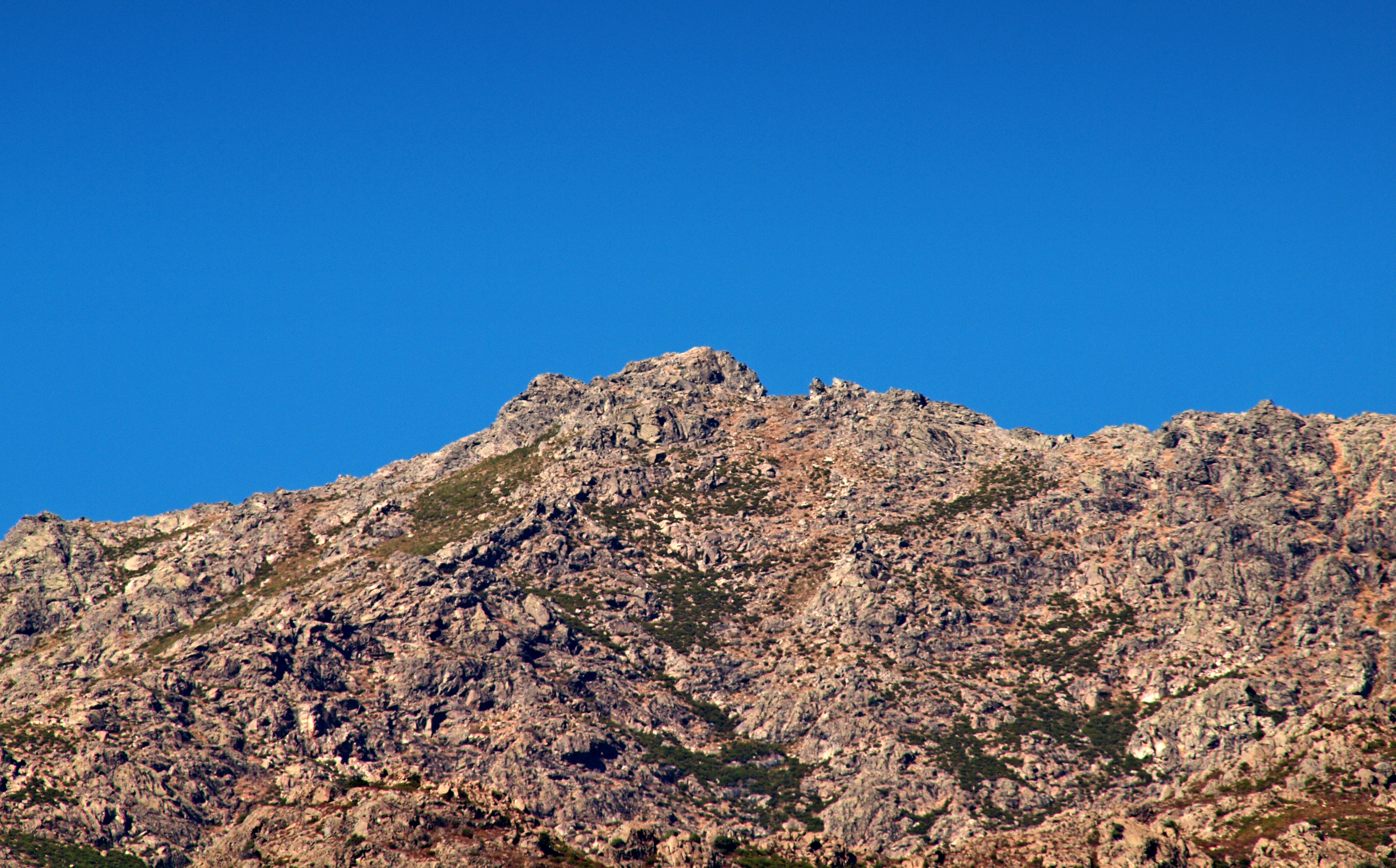
Summit

== Sources ==
- Lahondere, Didier; Rossi, Philippe; Lahondere, Jean-Claude (1999), "Structuration alpine d'une marge continentale externe : le massif du Tenda (Haute-Corse). Implications géodynamiques au niveau de la transversale Corse-Apennins" (PDF), Géologie de la France (in French) (4): 27–44
- "Le Monte Astu à partir de Lama", Visorando (in French)
- "Monte Asto, France", Peakbagger
- "Node: Monte Astu (26863790)", OpenStreetMap
- "Rando 17 : Monte Astu", Outdooractive.com
