= Monte Stello =

- Monte Stellu
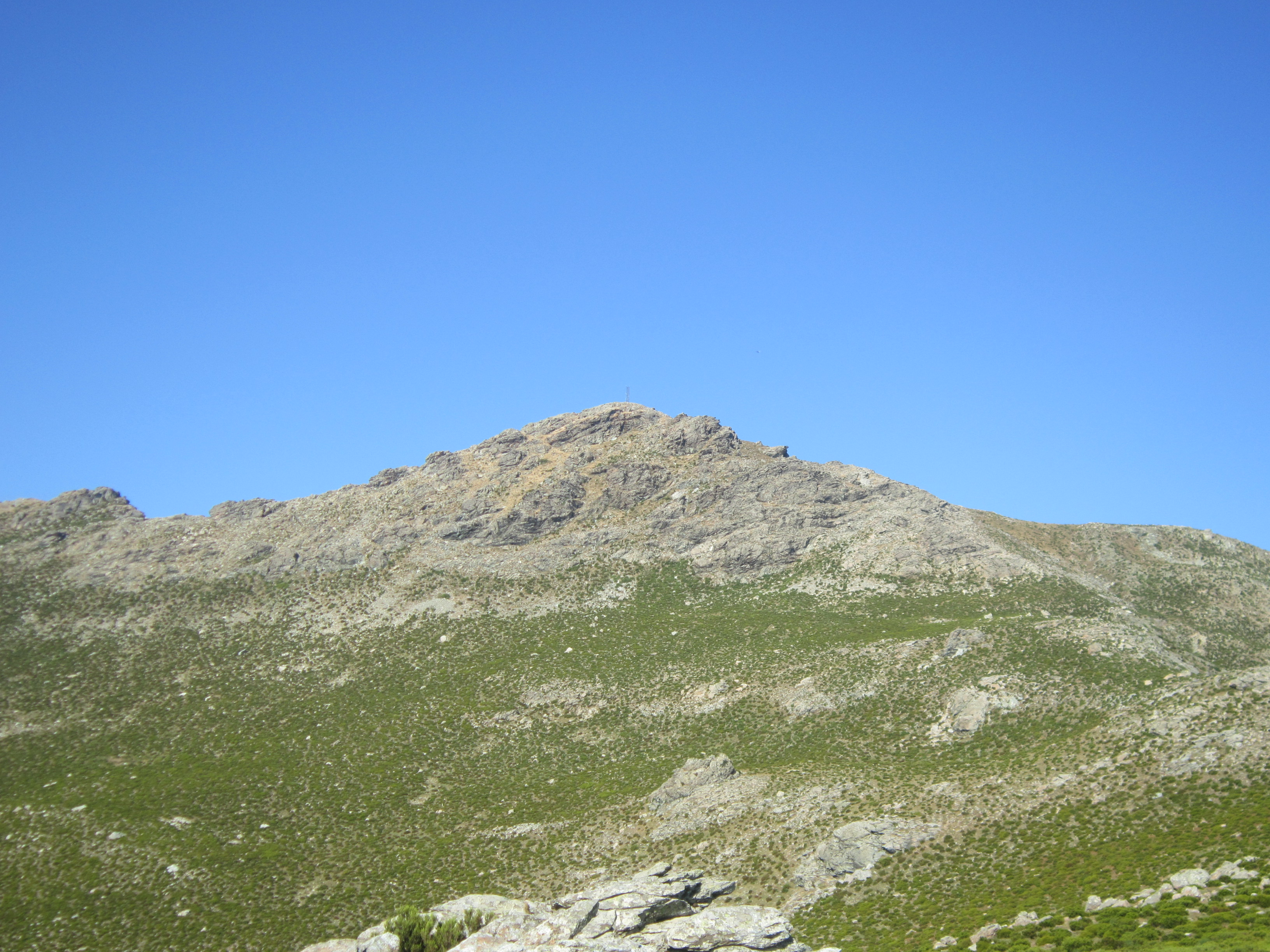
- Monte Stellu

Highest point
- Elevation: 1,306 m (4,285 ft)
- Prominence: 347 m (1,138 ft)
- Parent peak: Cima di e Follicie
- Isolation: 5.1 km (3.2 mi)
- Coordinates: 42°47′19″N 9°25′07″E

Geography
- Location within Corsica
- Country: France
- Department: Haute-Corse

Geology
- Formed by: Fold and thrust belt
- Orogeny: Alpine orogeny
- Rock age: Cretaceous
- Rock type: Ophiolite

Monte Stello (or Monte Stellu) is a mountain in the department of Haute-Corse on the island of Corsica, France. It is the second highest point in the Monte Stello Massif, which forms the backbone of Cap Corse.

== Location ==
The peak is roughly at the intersection of the borders of the communes of Olcani to the northwest, Olmeta-di-Capocorso to the west and Brando to the east. It is east of the village of Olmeta-di-Capocorso and west of the village of Erbalunga on the east coast.

== Physical ==
Monte Stello has a prominence of 347 metres (1,138 ft) and an elevation of 1,306 metres (4,285 ft). It is isolated by 5.1 kilometres (3.2 mi) from the 1,324 metres (4,344 ft) Cima di e Follicie to the north northwest.

Monte Stello consists of Cretaceous ophiolites that were formed during the Alpine orogeny.

== Hiking ==
The trail from the hamlet of Pozzo has a total ascent of about 1,000 metres (3,300 ft). It is long and takes about six and a half hours to complete, but is well-marked and not technically demanding. It runs through maquis shrubland. From the summit there is an excellent panorama of the north of Corsica.

== Gallery ==
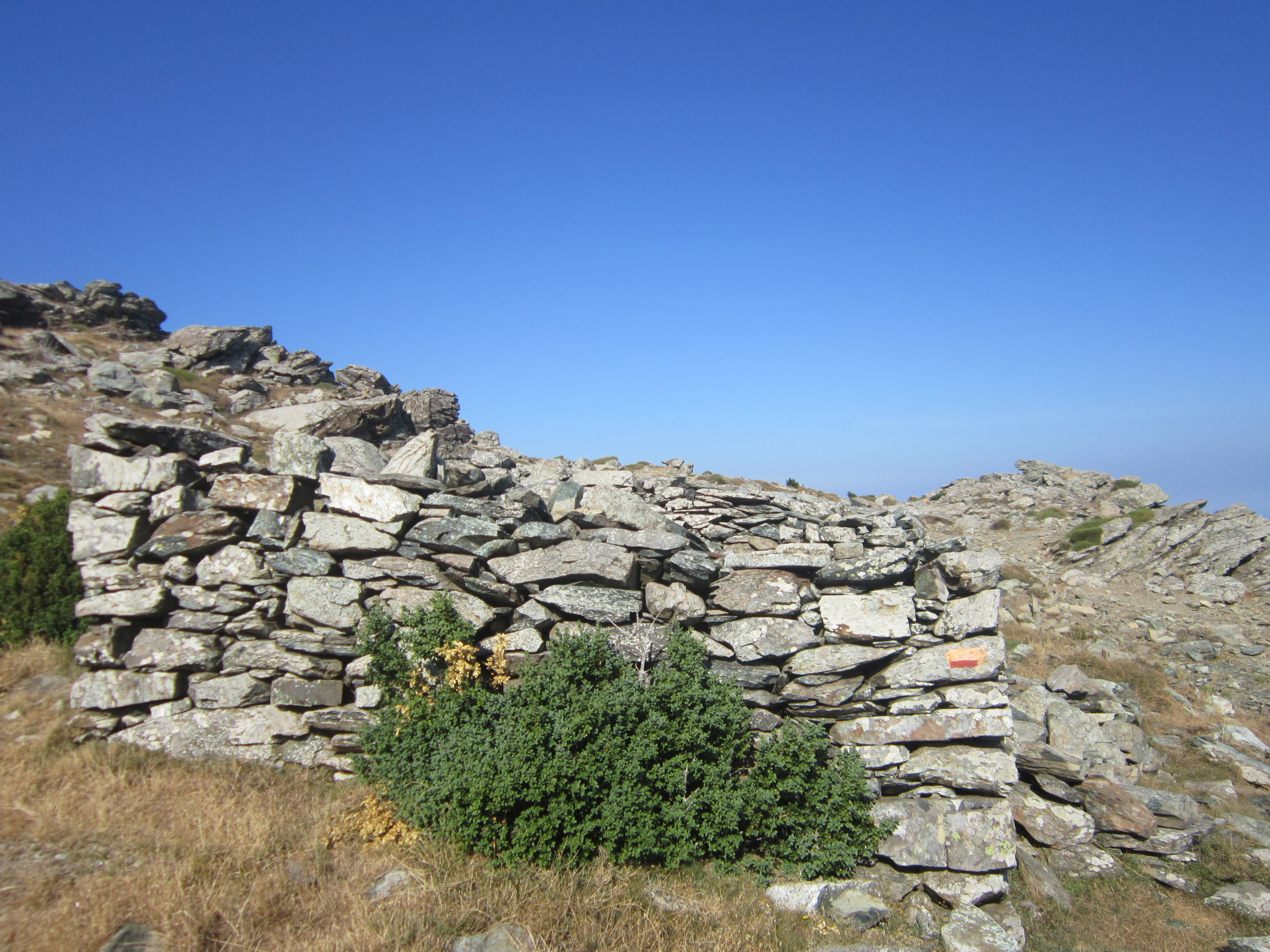
Shelter near the summit of Monte Stellu

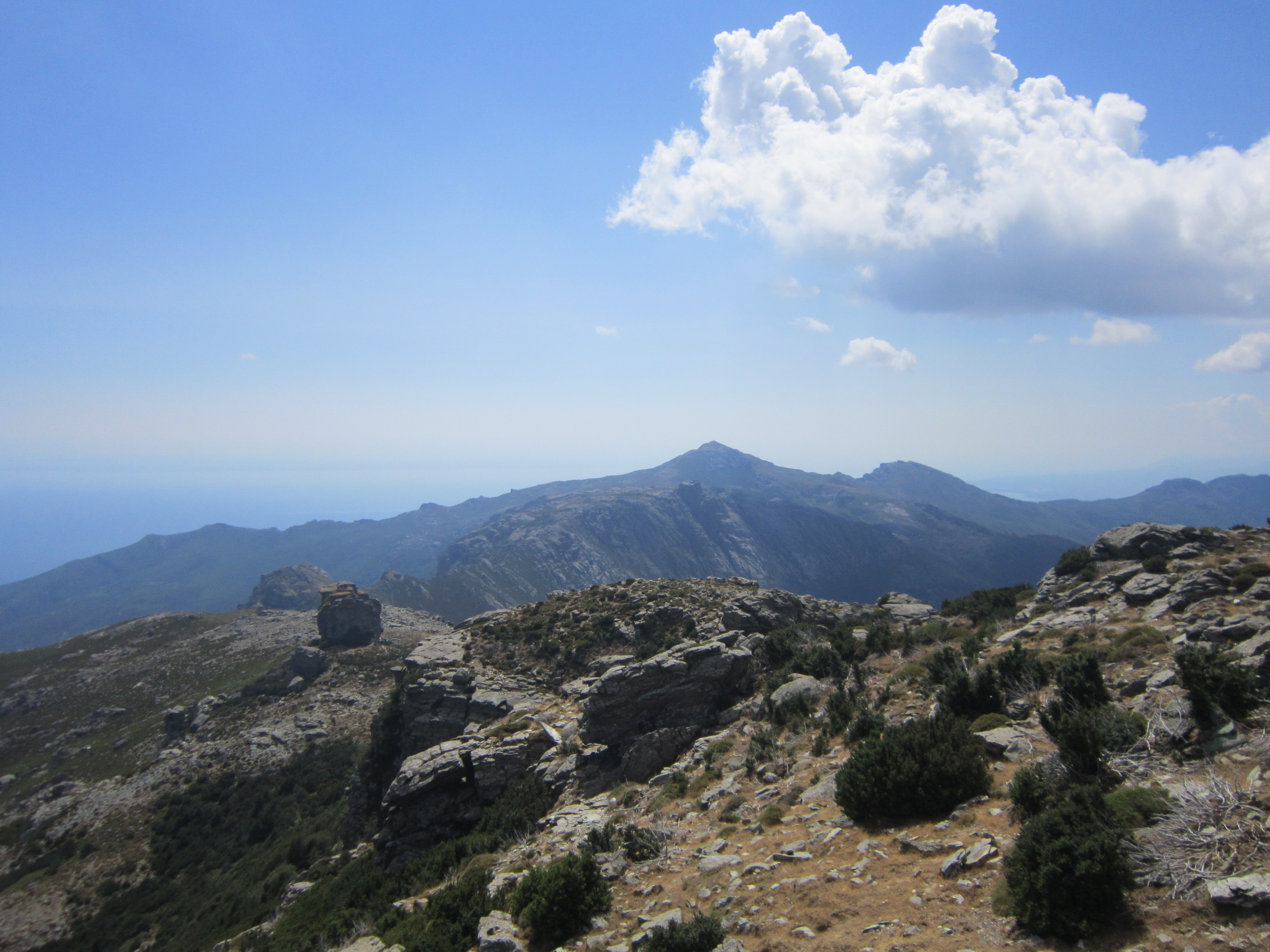
Monte Stellu seen from Cima à e Follicce

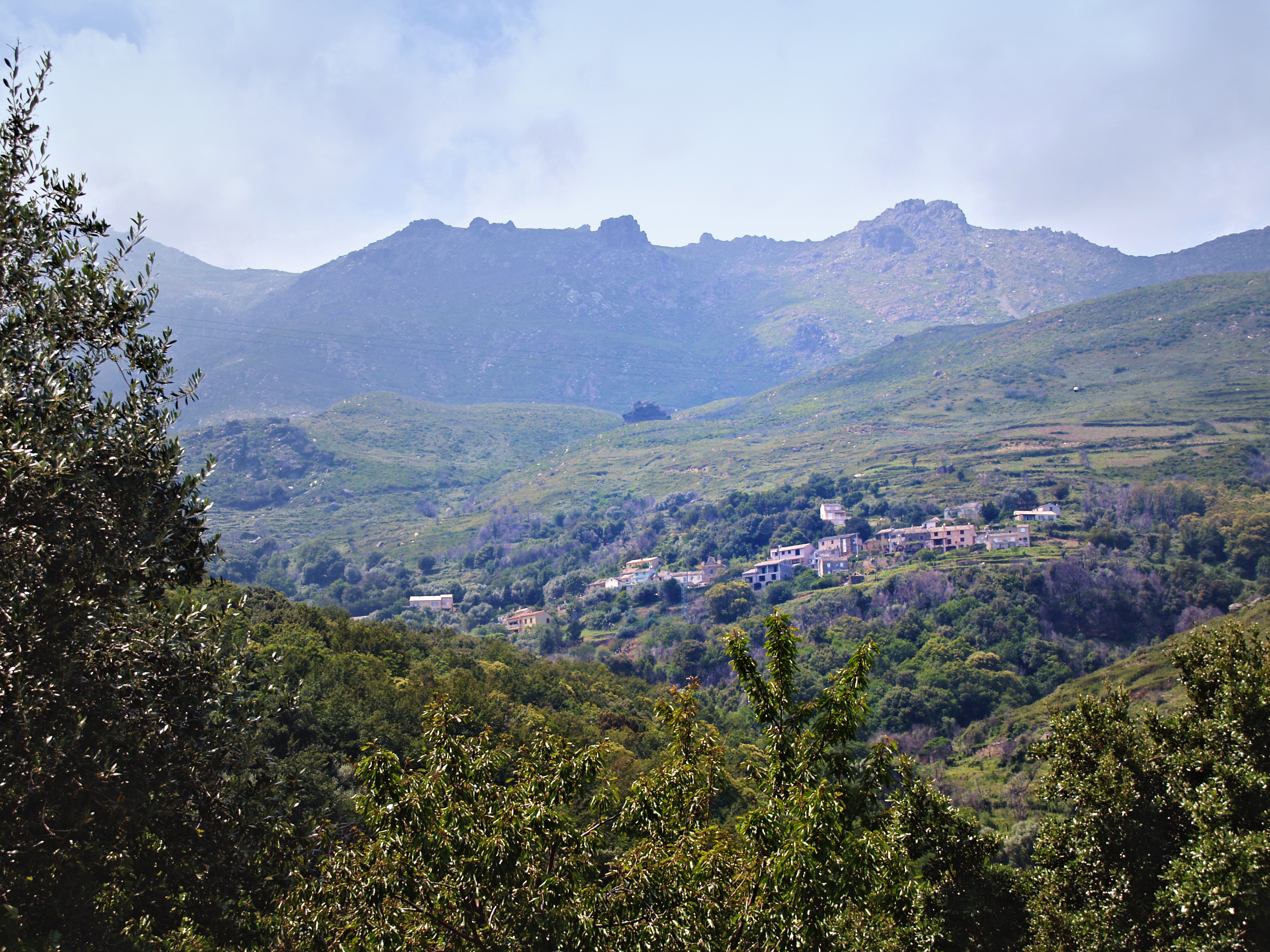
Hamlet of Silgaggia and crestline of Monte Stellu

== Sources ==
- "Atlas thématique de la Corse. BASTIA 1/50.000." (PDF), brgm.rf (in French), BRGM - Service Géologique Régional Bastia, 1996
- "Monte Stello in Corsica", Hiking and Cooking in the South of France
- "Monte Stello, France", Peakbagger
- "Node: Monte Stello (1321573465)", OpenStreetMap
