= Tour de Castellare =

Genoese coastal defence tower in Corsica

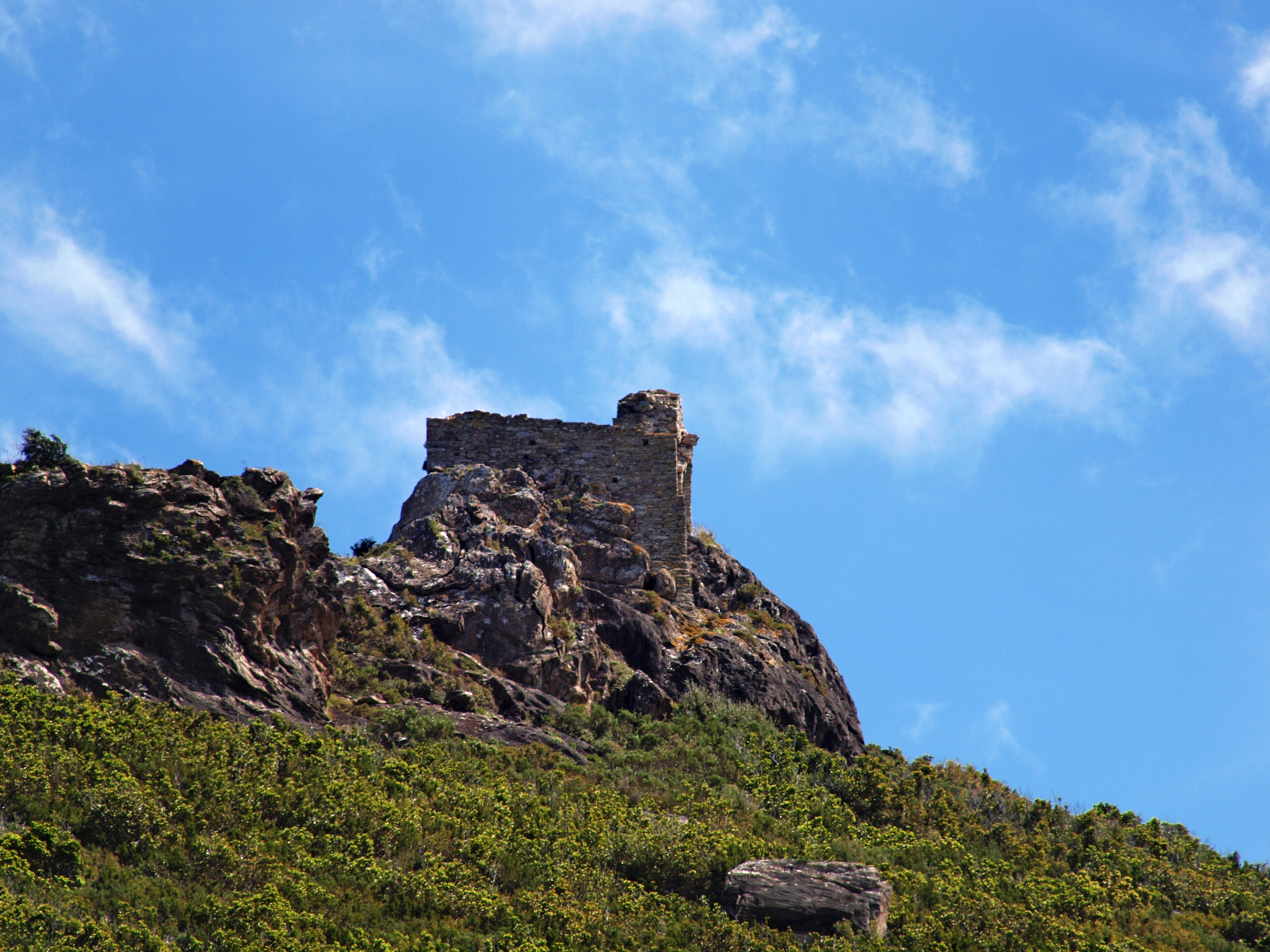

- Location within Corsica
- 42°50′1″N 9°28′53.3″E

History
- Built: Second half 16th century

The Tour de Castellare (Corsican: Torra di Castellare) is a ruined Genoese tower located in the commune of Pietracorbara on the east coast of Corsica. Only part of the square base survives.

The tower was built in the second half of the 16th century. It was one of a series of coastal defences constructed by the Republic of Genoa between 1530 and 1620 to stem the attacks by Barbary pirates. In Genoese documents the tower is called the tower of Ampuglia.

== See also ==
- List of Genoese towers in Corsica
