= Monte Stello Massif =

Massif in Corsica, France

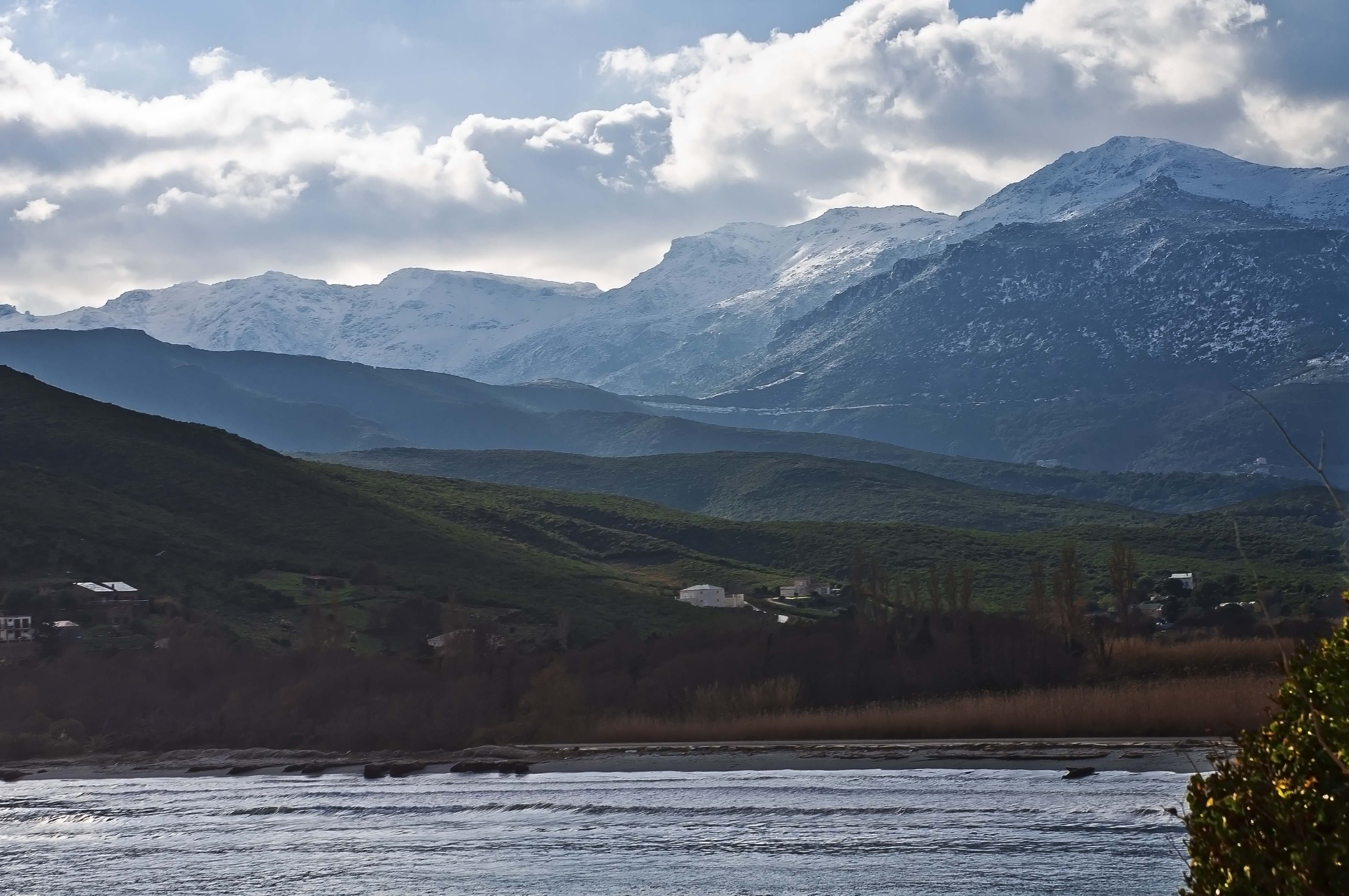
- Winter scene from the beach at Pietracorbara

Highest point
- Peak: Cima di e Follicie
- Elevation: 1,324 m (4,344 ft)
- Coordinates: 42°49′41″N 9°23′9″E

Geography
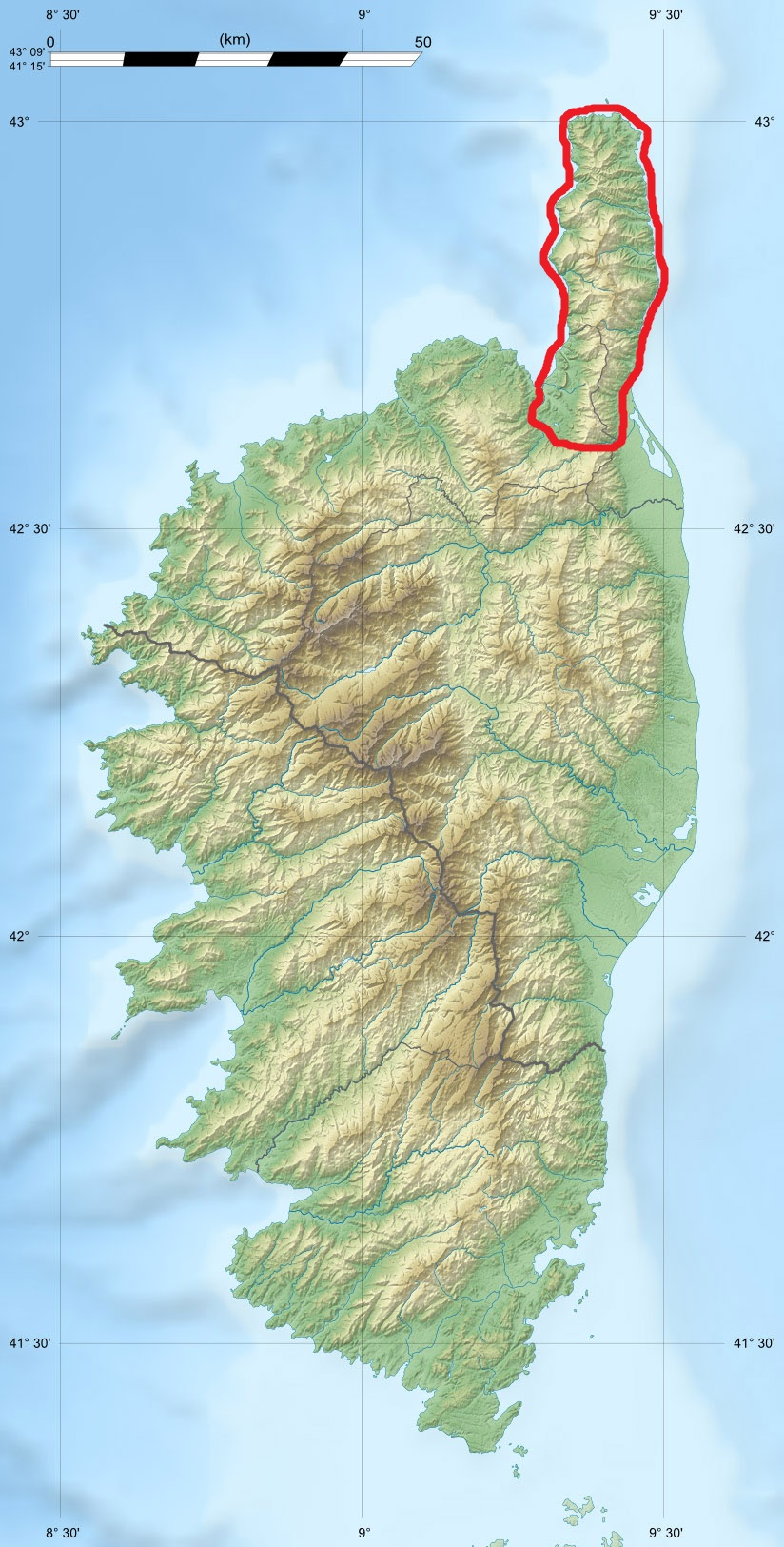
- Location: Haute-Corse, Corsica, France

The Monte Stello Massif (French: Massif du Monte Stello) is a chain of mountains in the island of Corsica, France, that forms the spine of the northern peninsula, Cap Corse. It takes its name from Monte Stello, which was long thought to be the highest peak, but more recently it has been determined that Cima di e Follicie is the highest.

== Geography ==
The Monte Stello Massif constitutes the mountain spine of Cap Corse, at the northeastern end of the island. Of the mountains, Cima di e Follicie surpasses Monte Stello by 15 metres (49 ft) to reach 1,322 metres (4,337 ft) in height. The Col de Santo Stefano, or Santo Stefano pass, provides a route from the Mediterranean coast to the Tyrrhenian coast of Corsica. It divides the Monte Stello Massif from the Monte Astu Massif, both part of "Schistose Corsica" in the northeast of the island. The Lugo or Campodata stream rises on the western slope of the pass, a tributary of the Aliso River, and the Bevinco river flows through the Lancone gorge on the eastern side. The massif stretches over 40 kilometres (25 mi) from north to south, from the tip of Cap Corse to the Col de Santo Stefano.

== Peaks ==
The main peaks are:

| Name | Elevation | | Prominence | |
| Name | meters | feet | meters | feet |
|---|---|---|---|---|
| Cima di e Follicie | 1,324 | 4,344 | 954 | 3,130 |
| Monte Stello | 1,306 | 4,285 | 348 | 1,142 |
| Monte Prato | 1,282 | 4,206 | 0 | 0 |
| Cime de Codoli | 1,260 | 4,130 | 0 | 0 |
| Monte Caneto | 1,256 | 4,121 | 0 | 0 |
| Monte Capra | 1,203 | 3,947 | 0 | 0 |
| Monte Prunu | 1,198 | 3,930 | 0 | 0 |
| Monte di a Cibiolla | 1,196 | 3,924 | 0 | 0 |
| Croce Viezza | 1,165 | 3,822 | 0 | 0 |
| Monte Alticcione | 1,139 | 3,737 | 0 | 0 |
| Monte Foscu | 1,102 | 3,615 | 0 | 0 |
| Monte di Giagoppa | 1,038 | 3,406 | 0 | 0 |
| Cima di Gratera | 1,024 | 3,360 | 0 | 0 |
| Monte a Poni | 991 | 3,251 | 0 | 0 |
| Serra di Pigno | 960 | 3,150 | 0 | 0 |
| Cime du Zuccarello | 955 | 3,133 | 419 | 1,375 |
| Monte Cucaru | 933 | 3,061 | 0 | 0 |
| Monte Grofiglieta | 836 | 2,743 | 0 | 0 |
| Punta di Gulfidoni | 606 | 1,988 | 0 | 0 |
| Monte di e Castelle | 602 | 1,975 | 0 | 0 |

== Gallery ==
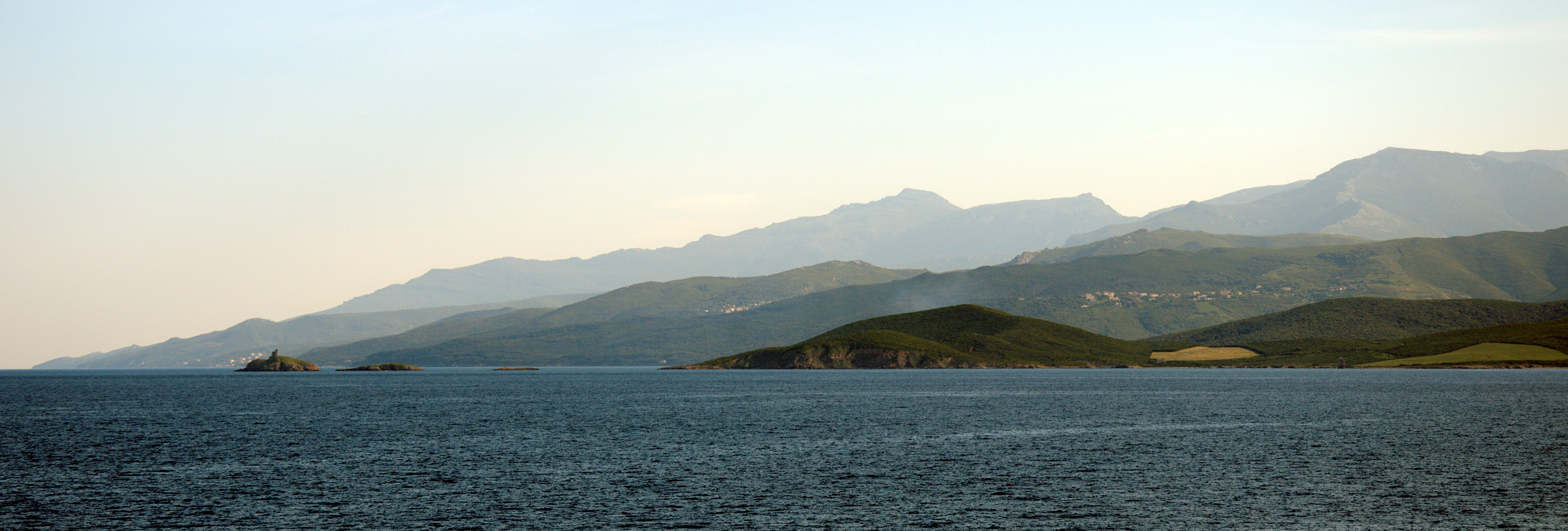
Monte Stello from the surroundings of the Finocchiarola Islands

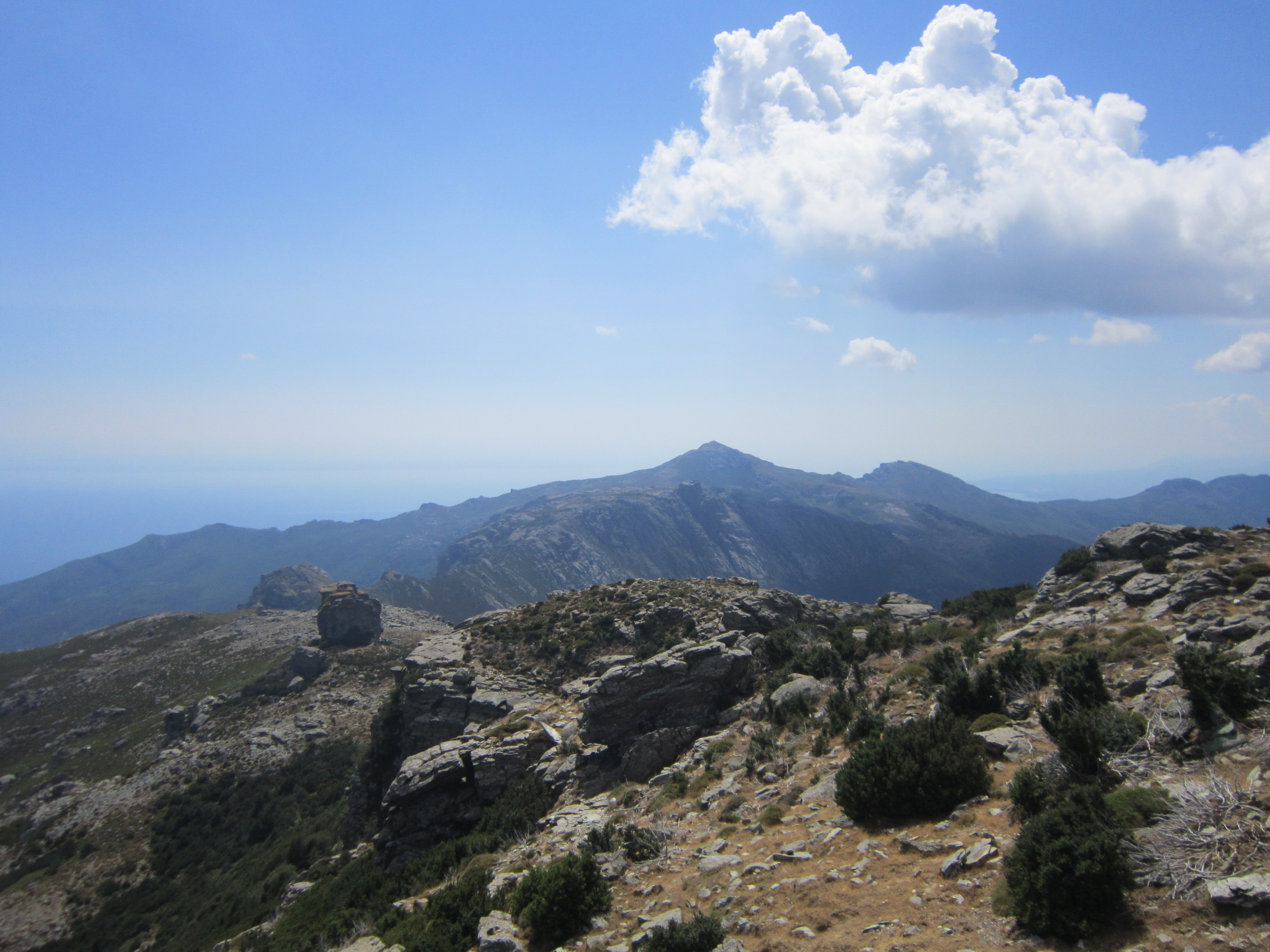
Monte Stellu seen from Cima à e Follicce

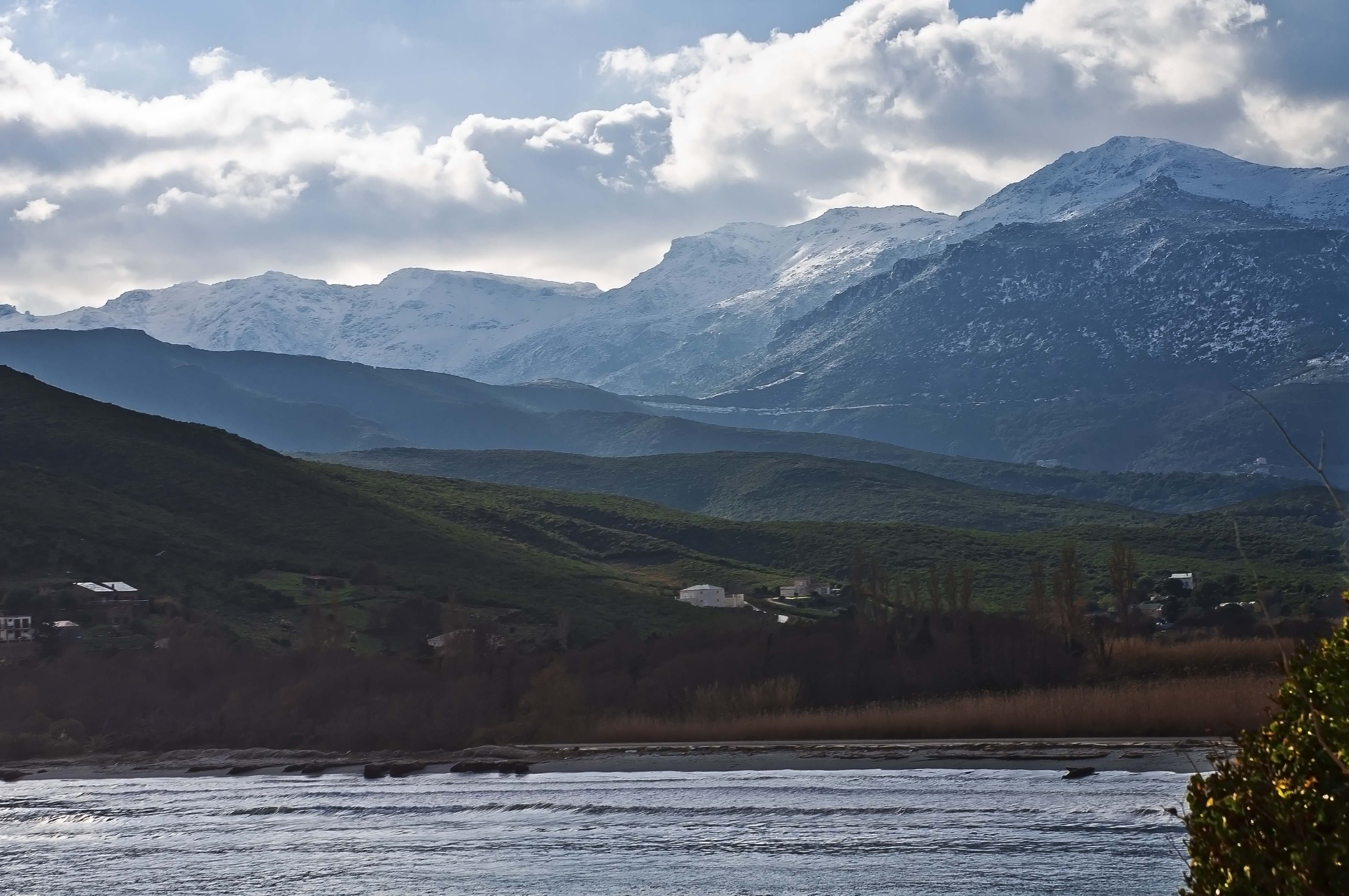
Snow covered Cima di e Follicie (left) from the beach of Pietracorbara

== Sources ==
- "Col de Santo Stefano", Top10Endroits (in French)
- "Les 7 massifs corses", Corse Location Villa (in French)
- "Way: Ruisseau de Campodata (719031815)", OpenStreetMap
