= Ostriconi =

River in the department of Haute-Corse, Corsica

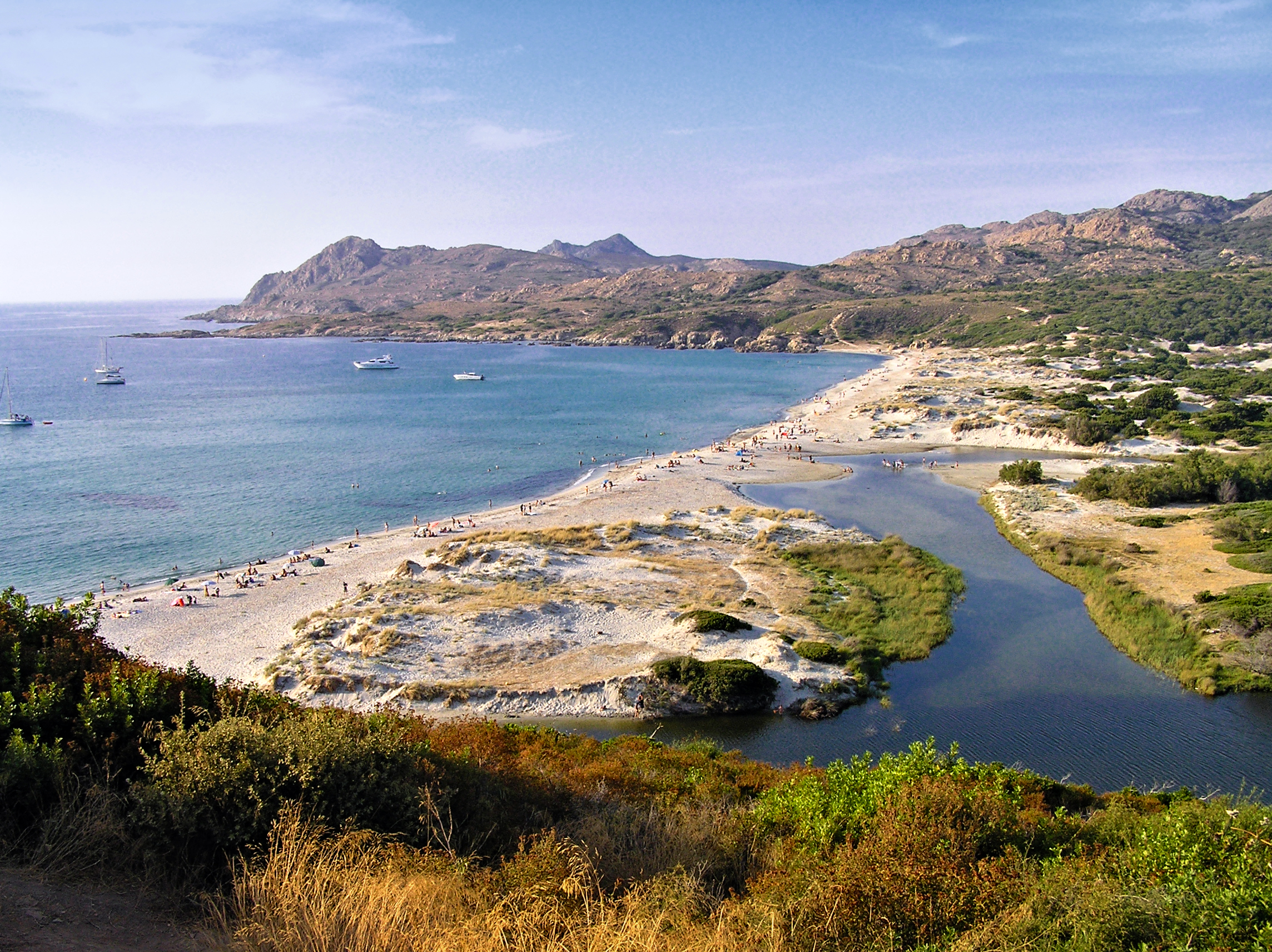
- Mouth of the Ostriconi on the beach

- Location within Corsica Location within France

Location
- Country: France
- Region: Corsica
- Department: Haute-Corse

Physical characteristics
- Mouth: Mediterranean Sea
  - location: Palasca
  - coordinates: 42°39′34″N 9°03′29″E
- Length: 23.2 kilometres (14.4 mi)
- Basin size: 135 square kilometres (52 sq mi)

The Ostriconi is a small coastal river in the department of Haute-Corse, Corsica, France.

== Course ==
The Ostriconi is 23.34 kilometres (14.50 mi) long. It crosses the communes of Lama, Novella, Palasca, Pietralba and Urtaca.

The Ostriconi rises to the east of the village of Pietralba below the 1,427 metres (4,682 ft) Punta di Paganella and the 1,469 metres (4,820 ft) Monte Reghia di Pozzo. It flows west and passes to the south of Pietralba, then flows northwest to the Mediterranean Sea. The T30 road runs parallel to the Ostriconi for most of its length.

== Tributaries ==
The following streams (ruisseaux) are tributaries of the Ostriconi:

- Vadellare 10 kilometres (6.2 mi)
  - Monticellaciu 3 kilometres (1.9 mi)
    - Peraldu 2 kilometres (1.2 mi)
    - Piobetta 2 kilometres (1.2 mi)
    - Scubella 1 kilometre (0.62 mi)
  - Monte Grossu 2 kilometres (1.2 mi)
  - Campotile 1 kilometre (0.62 mi)
  - Cruschininca 1 kilometre (0.62 mi)
- Chierchiu 7 kilometres (4.3 mi)
  - Manichella 5 kilometres (3.1 mi)
- Fiume di Gargalagne 7 kilometres (4.3 mi)
  - Fiume a I Peri 4 kilometres (2.5 mi)
- Salginco 7 kilometres (4.3 mi)
  - Noci 7 kilometres (4.3 mi)
    - Malpruniccia 2 kilometres (1.2 mi)
    - Cava 1 kilometre (0.62 mi)
  - San Giorgio 5 kilometres (3.1 mi)
  - Mezzanello 2 kilometres (1.2 mi)
  - Parghinese 5 kilometres (3.1 mi)
- Cugnolu 5 kilometres (3.1 mi)
- l'Ondole 5 kilometres (3.1 mi)
- Fiume di Cuvertoio 4 kilometres (2.5 mi)
  - Grotta Rossa 1 kilometre (0.62 mi)
- Funtana Bona 4 kilometres (2.5 mi)
- Appiatelli 4 kilometres (2.5 mi)
  - e Scale 2 kilometres (1.2 mi)
- Nuvalicce 4 kilometres (2.5 mi)
- Compolelli 3 kilometres (1.9 mi)
- Malculo 3 kilometres (1.9 mi)
  - Bodulo 1 kilometre (0.62 mi)
- Ravin de l'Ostricone 3 kilometres (1.9 mi)
- l'Orneto 3 kilometres (1.9 mi)
- Ponte 2 kilometres (1.2 mi)
- Furchelle 2 kilometres (1.2 mi)
- Felicione 2 kilometres (1.2 mi)
- Ostincaia 1 kilometre (0.62 mi)
- Villanaccio 1 kilometre (0.62 mi)
- Valle Tesi 1 kilometre (0.62 mi)
- Focolaccio 1 kilometre (0.62 mi)
- Valli 1 kilometre (0.62 mi)
- Sossa 1 kilometre (0.62 mi)
- Calasconi 1 kilometre (0.62 mi)

== Sources ==
- "L'Ostriconi", Sandre (in French)
- "Relation: L'Ostriconi (8481190)", OpenStreetMap
