= Pietracorbara =

Pietracorbara Pietracurbara
- Commune
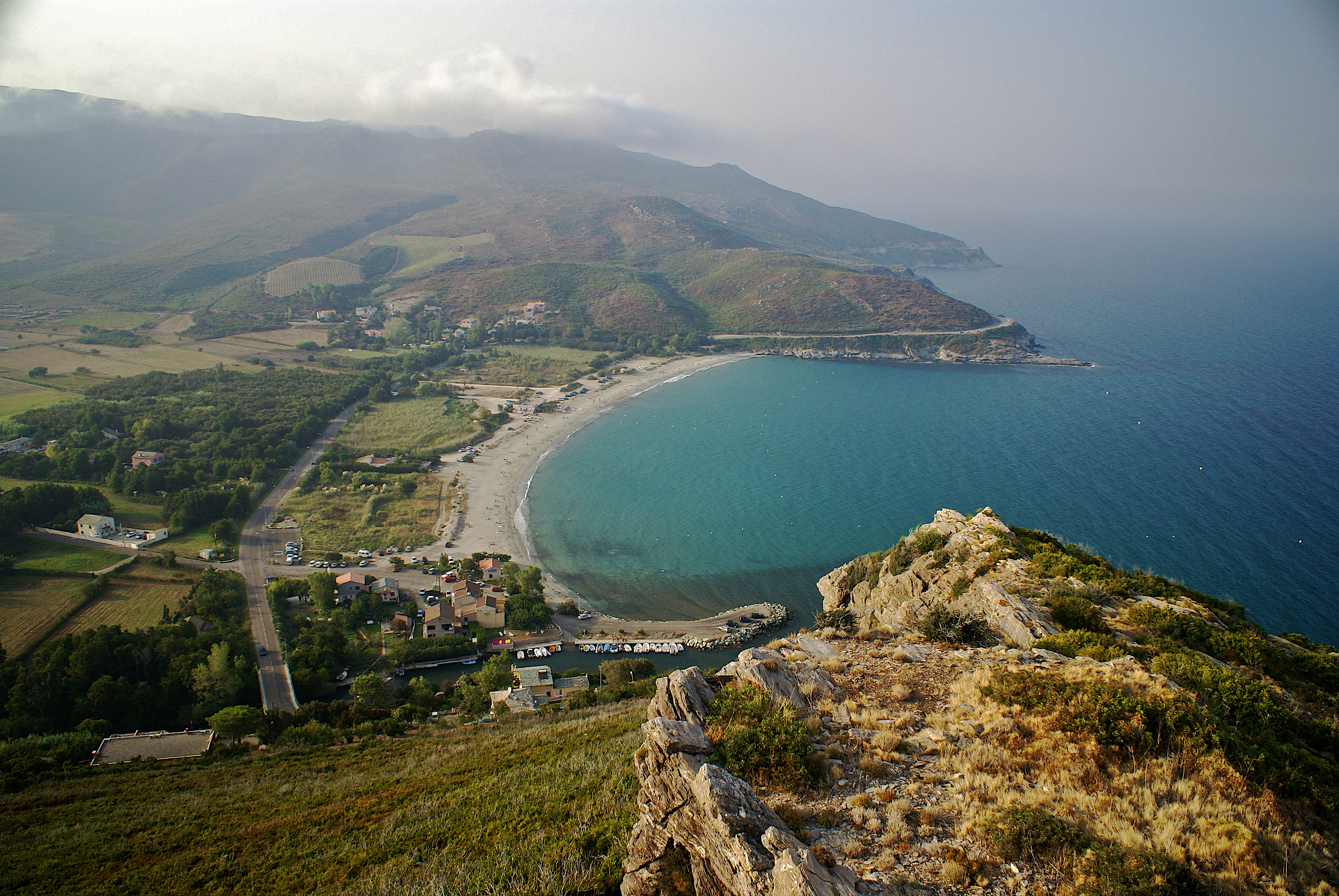
- A high view of the bay at Pietracorbara
- Location of Pietracorbara
- Location within France Location within Corsica
- Coordinates: 42°50′00″N 9°28′00″E
- Country: France
- Region: Corsica
- Department: Haute-Corse
- Arrondissement: Bastia
- Canton: Cap Corse
- Intercommunality: Cap Corse

Government
  - Mayor (2020–2026): Alain Burroni
- Area^{1}: 25.93 km^{2} (10.01 sq mi)
- Highest elevation: 1,300 m (4,300 ft)
- Lowest elevation: 0 m (0 ft)
- Population (2023): 652
  - Density: 25.1/km^{2} (65.1/sq mi)
- Time zone: UTC+01:00 (CET)
  - Summer (DST): UTC+02:00 (CEST)
- INSEE/Postal code: 2B224 /20247
- ^{1} French Land Register data, which excludes lakes, ponds, glaciers > 1 km^{2} (0.386 sq mi or 247 acres) and river estuaries.

Pietracorbara (French pronunciation: [pjɛtʁakɔʁbaʁa]; Corsican: A Petra Curbara) is a commune in the Haute-Corse department of France on the island of Corsica. It takes its name from the Pietracorbara stream.

== Population ==
Historical population
Year	Pop.	±% p.a.
1968	270	—
1975	234	−2.02%
1982	229	−0.31%
1990	363	+5.93%
1999	433	+1.98%
2007	541	+2.82%
2012	616	+2.63%
2017	652	+1.14%
2023	652	+0.00%
Source: INSEE

== See also ==
- Tour de Castellare
- Communes of the Haute-Corse department
