= Urtaca =

Commune in Corsica, France

- Commune
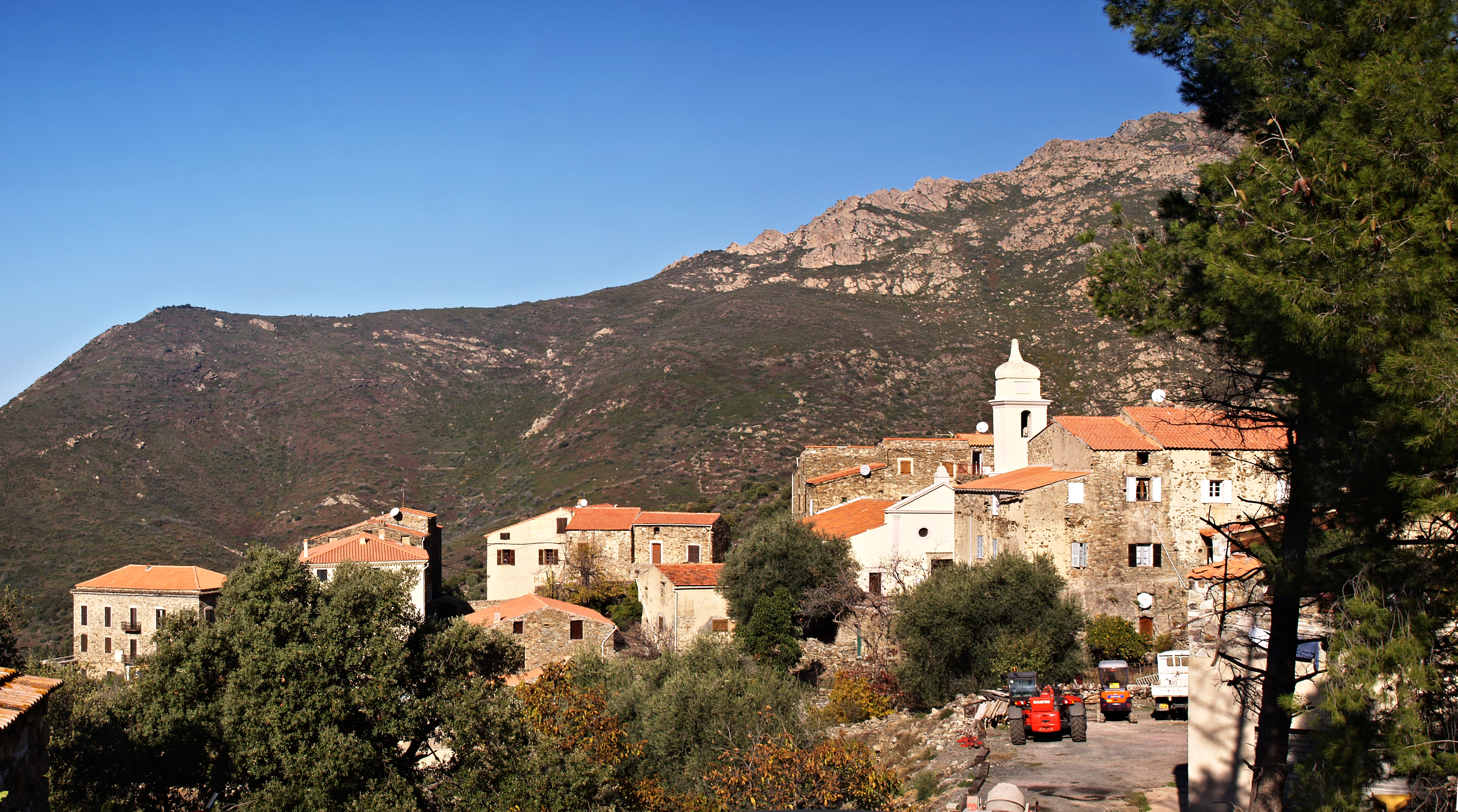
- A panorama of the village of Urtaca
- Location of Urtaca
- Location within France Location within Corsica
- Coordinates: 42°35′39″N 9°10′03″E
- Country: France
- Region: Corsica
- Department: Haute-Corse
- Arrondissement: Calvi
- Canton: L'Île-Rousse

Government
  - Mayor (2020–2026): Paul-Vincent Ferrandi
- Area^{1}: 31.26 km^{2} (12.07 sq mi)
- Elevation: 380 m (1,250 ft)
- Highest elevation: 1,367 m (4,485 ft)
- Lowest elevation: 37 m (121 ft)
- Population (2023): 263
  - Density: 8.41/km^{2} (21.8/sq mi)
- Time zone: UTC+01:00 (CET)
  - Summer (DST): UTC+02:00 (CEST)
- INSEE/Postal code: 2B332 /20218
- ^{1} French Land Register data, which excludes lakes, ponds, glaciers > 1 km^{2} (0.386 sq mi or 247 acres) and river estuaries.

Urtaca (Italian pronunciation: [urˈtaːka], Corsican: Ùrtaca) is a commune in the French department of Haute-Corse, on the island of Corsica.

== Geography ==
Urtaca is located in the north of Corsica at the confluence of the Ostricone and the Fiume di Gargalagne at the foot of 1,018-metre (3,340 ft)-high Mont Vicinasco.

== Population ==
Historical population
Year	Pop.	±% p.a.
1968	220	—
1975	198	−1.49%
1982	178	−1.51%
1990	155	−1.71%
1999	172	+1.16%
2007	195	+1.58%
2012	187	−0.83%
2017	230	+4.23%
2023	263	+2.26%
Source: INSEE

== See also ==
- Communes of the Haute-Corse department
