= Pietralba =

- Commune
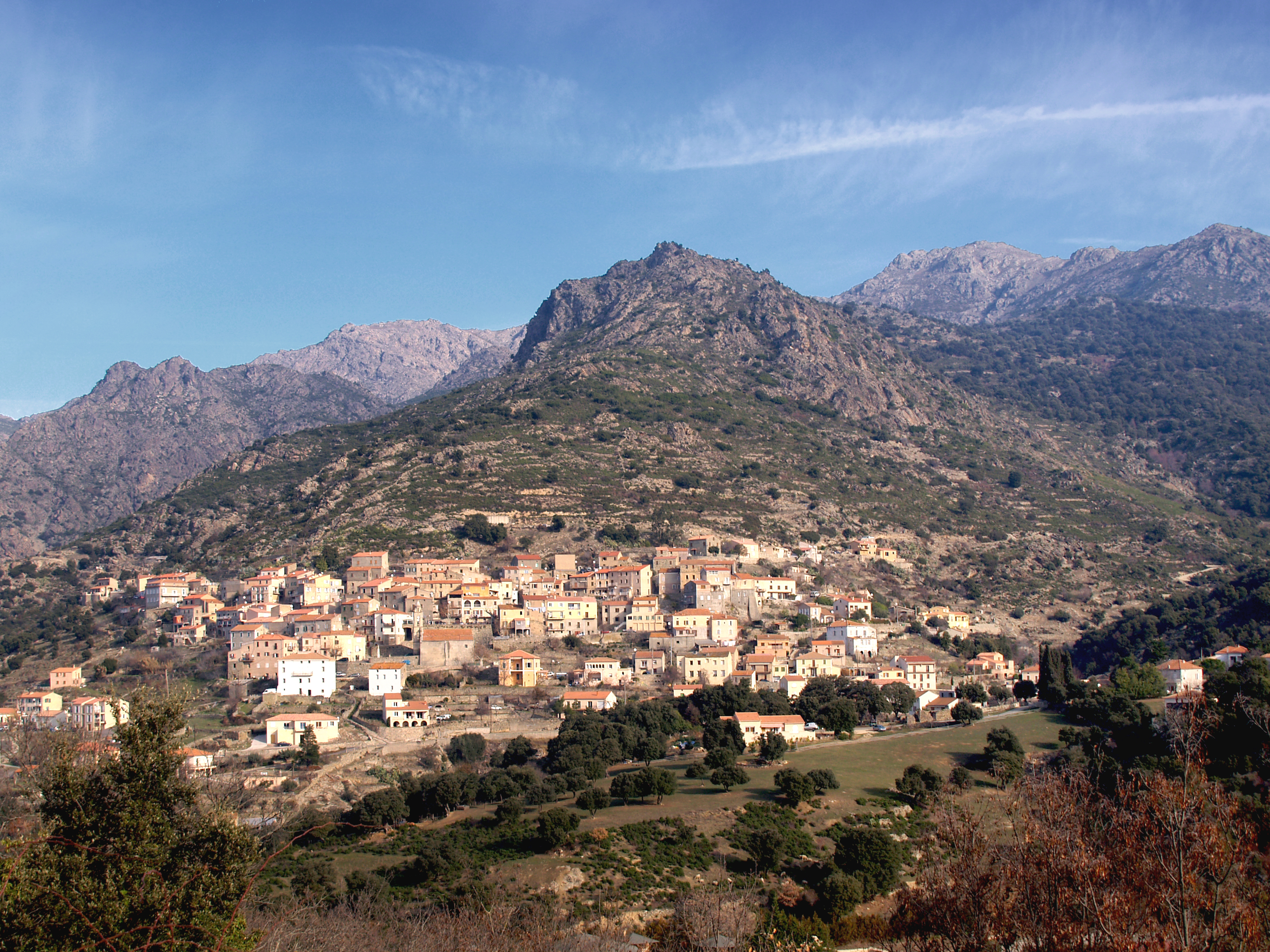
- The village of Pietralba
- Location of Pietralba
- Location within France Location within Corsica
- Coordinates: 42°32′51″N 9°11′11″E
- Country: France
- Region: Corsica
- Department: Haute-Corse
- Arrondissement: Calvi
- Canton: Golo-Morosaglia

Government
  - Mayor (2020–2026): José Sauli
- Area^{1}: 38.98 km^{2} (15.05 sq mi)
- Elevation: 450 m (1,480 ft)
- Highest elevation: 1,520 m (4,990 ft)
- Lowest elevation: 251 m (823 ft)
- Population (2023): 507
  - Density: 13.0/km^{2} (33.7/sq mi)
- Time zone: UTC+01:00 (CET)
  - Summer (DST): UTC+02:00 (CEST)
- INSEE/Postal code: 2B223 /20218
- ^{1} French Land Register data, which excludes lakes, ponds, glaciers > 1 km^{2} (0.386 sq mi or 247 acres) and river estuaries.

Pietralba (French pronunciation: [pjɛtʁalba]; Corsican: Petralba) is a commune in the Haute-Corse department of France on the island of Corsica.

== Geography ==
=== Climate ===
Pietralba has a mediterranean climate (Köppen climate classification Csa). The average annual temperature in Pietralba is 13.9 °C (57.0 °F). The average annual rainfall is 651.7 mm (25.66 in) with December as the wettest month. The temperatures are highest on average in August, at around 22.8 °C (73.0 °F), and lowest in January, at around 6.6 °C (43.9 °F). The highest temperature ever recorded in Pietralba was 38.4 °C (101.1 °F) on 3 August 2017; the coldest temperature ever recorded was −7.2 °C (19.0 °F) on 2 March 2005.

Climate data for Pietralba (1981−2010 normals, extremes 1991−present)
Month	Jan	Feb	Mar	Apr	May	Jun	Jul	Aug	Sep	Oct	Nov	Dec	Year
Record high °C (°F)	22.0 (71.6)	20.6 (69.1)	27.3 (81.1)	27.6 (81.7)	34.4 (93.9)	36.4 (97.5)	38.3 (100.9)	38.4 (101.1)	34.2 (93.6)	28.4 (83.1)	24.2 (75.6)	20.8 (69.4)	38.4 (101.1)
Mean daily maximum °C (°F)	10.5 (50.9)	11.2 (52.2)	13.6 (56.5)	16.2 (61.2)	21.3 (70.3)	25.1 (77.2)	28.2 (82.8)	28.3 (82.9)	23.8 (74.8)	19.5 (67.1)	14.3 (57.7)	11.0 (51.8)	18.6 (65.5)
Daily mean °C (°F)	6.6 (43.9)	6.8 (44.2)	9.1 (48.4)	11.6 (52.9)	16.2 (61.2)	19.7 (67.5)	22.6 (72.7)	22.8 (73.0)	18.7 (65.7)	15.0 (59.0)	10.4 (50.7)	7.3 (45.1)	13.9 (57.0)
Mean daily minimum °C (°F)	2.7 (36.9)	2.3 (36.1)	4.5 (40.1)	6.9 (44.4)	11.1 (52.0)	14.4 (57.9)	16.9 (62.4)	17.2 (63.0)	13.5 (56.3)	10.5 (50.9)	6.4 (43.5)	3.6 (38.5)	9.2 (48.6)
Record low °C (°F)	−5.0 (23.0)	−7.0 (19.4)	−7.2 (19.0)	−0.7 (30.7)	0.9 (33.6)	5.8 (42.4)	10.6 (51.1)	10.4 (50.7)	6.8 (44.2)	1.5 (34.7)	−1.7 (28.9)	−6.7 (19.9)	−7.2 (19.0)
Average precipitation mm (inches)	53.6 (2.11)	33.8 (1.33)	55.5 (2.19)	67.1 (2.64)	49.7 (1.96)	39.0 (1.54)	12.5 (0.49)	21.1 (0.83)	45.2 (1.78)	72.0 (2.83)	99.4 (3.91)	102.8 (4.05)	651.7 (25.66)
Average precipitation days (≥ 1.0 mm)	6.4	5.8	6.5	7.9	5.2	4.1	1.5	2.2	5.6	7.9	9.5	9.1	71.5
Source: Météo France

== Population ==
Historical population
Year	Pop.	±% p.a.
1968	384	—
1975	368	−0.61%
1982	340	−1.12%
1990	244	−4.06%
1999	314	+2.84%
2007	417	+3.61%
2012	430	+0.62%
2017	504	+3.23%
2023	507	+0.10%
Source: INSEE

== See also ==
- Communes of the Haute-Corse department
