= Rapale =

- Commune
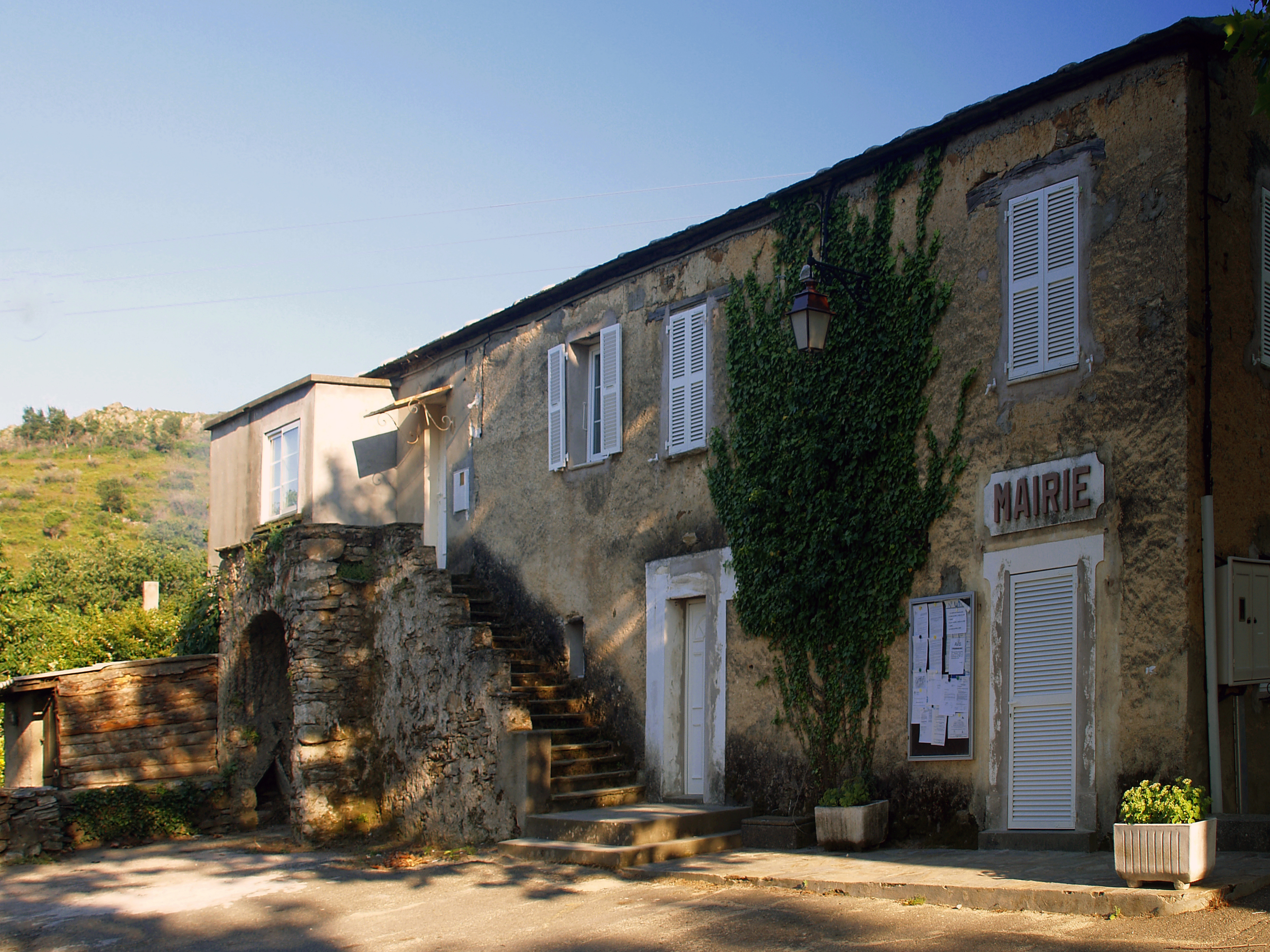
- The town hall in Rapale
- Location of Rapale
- Location within France Location within Corsica
- Coordinates: 42°35′30″N 9°18′15″E
- Country: France
- Region: Corsica
- Department: Haute-Corse
- Arrondissement: Calvi
- Canton: Biguglia-Nebbio

Government
  - Mayor (2020–2026): Jean-Claude Fondacci de Paoli
- Area^{1}: 10.16 km^{2} (3.92 sq mi)
- Elevation: 400 m (1,300 ft)
- Highest elevation: 687 m (2,254 ft)
- Lowest elevation: 16 m (52 ft)
- Population (2023): 162
  - Density: 15.9/km^{2} (41.3/sq mi)
- Time zone: UTC+01:00 (CET)
  - Summer (DST): UTC+02:00 (CEST)
- INSEE/Postal code: 2B257 /20258
- ^{1} French Land Register data, which excludes lakes, ponds, glaciers > 1 km^{2} (0.386 sq mi or 247 acres) and river estuaries.

Rapale is a commune in the French Department of Haute-Corse on the island of Corsica.

== Geography ==
Rapale is located in southern Nebbio. It is one of the 14 municipalities making up the Canton of Biguglia-Nebbio. Its territory stretches from the slopes of Monte Pietesco to the south, spread around the village and continues with a long strip led North North-west to the eastern entrance of the Agriates.

To the east of the creek Fornello which rises on the slopes of Monte Pietesco and took the name of Brook Salinelle after its confluence with the creek Cicendolle, serves as territorial boundary with Vallecalle to the north the ford of Ilusone. Hence, this limit goes towards north-west, joins the river Aliso that runs for about a kilometer around the locality Forconi, then took the North to Punta Pizzolaccia and then rejoined the course of Aliso about 400 meters, crossing the plains to the D81 and the first hills south of Monte Agriates Revincu (Santo-Pietro-di-Tenda).

To the west, the Monte Guppio "horse" in Santo-Pietro-di-Tenda and Rapale, limitations join the plain of Aliso the is, at a place called Pilocaccia, where it leave South-South direction is a quasi-straight up the hill of Santo Pietro Vecchio, follow a low line ridge encircling the town of North-west to south.

Thus compound, its territory has varied landscapes, from the heights of the village that are green but not through the wooded village of fresh nest, the fertile plain of the Aliso until the first hills of the arid desert Agriates owned. Knowing that a small portion of these hills is in the area north of Rifle Range Casta.

=== Habitat ===
Rapale is a village located at the same altitude (350 meters) than its neighbors Sorio Pieve and Vallecalle, all built high up on defensive sites. It is situated on a ridge on the side of a mountain whose highest peaks on the town does not exceed 700 meters. Village "balcony" overlooking the plain of Oletta called Conca d'Oro.

The frame is old, with austere facades of the houses without balconies, roofs covered in slate and alternating red tiles.

=== Access ===
The D62 serves the village. This road leads east to the D81, the latter leading to Saint-Florent and Ile Rousse. It connects the RN 193 from the roundabout at Casatorra Biguglia to Route D81 (eastern entrance Agriates) and passes Col Santo Stefano, strategic crossroad serving both Oletta Biguglia/Bastia Rapale and Murato.
The D62 is the Corniche road in Upper Nebbiu. It passes through the villages of Santo-Pietro-di-Tenda, San-Gavino-di-Tenda Sorio Pieve Rapale. It runs through the town of Murato and the D162 is a ramp that saves the village Murato at a place called San Michele.

In the north, at the eastern entrance Agriates, the town is bisected by the D81 road.

== Population ==
Historical population
Year	Pop.	±% p.a.
1968	122	—
1975	116	−0.72%
1982	108	−1.02%
1990	102	−0.71%
1999	131	+2.82%
2007	152	+1.88%
2012	148	−0.53%
2017	151	+0.40%
2023	162	+1.18%
Source: INSEE

== History ==
=== Modern era ===
1789: the pieve of Bevinco is replaced by the Township Murato. The latter is composed of common Murato Pieve Rapale and Rutali.

1839: Prosper Mérimée visit the Nebbio 1 and 2 October. The first day he went on horseback to see "three curious churches" San Michele Murato, San Nicolao (Nera Chiesa) to Pieve and San Cesariu to Rapale.

1971-1973: The new Township High Nebbio is created with the merger of the former townships of imposed Lama Murato and Santo-Pietro-di-Tenda.

== Sights ==
parish church Santa Maria Assumpta

- Church Santa Maria Assumpta, Pisan legacy
- Fontaine and laundry has Rapalinca
- Église Saint-Césaire, classified as historical monument in 1840. It has the distinction of having been built in any serpentine, local green stone paired carefully. It is considered the twin of The church of San Michele of Murato. Abandoned to 1920, the collapse of its roof has led some of the walls. Classified, it is being restored.
- Chapel San Martino (St. Martin) in the north of the village parish church ruins.
- Chapel Sant'Anton'north of the chapel'San Martino, also ruined.

== Holidays and leisure ==
Panneau du Sentier

- Day 15 August, Assumption Day.
- Trail Rapale, Pieve - Soriu Between secular and sacred, circular route through the main strengths (religious heritages and civilian). From this trail, other courses are offered to outstanding works, such as a bridge Genoese church or San Cesariu Nera Chiesa.

== See also ==
- Communes of the Haute-Corse department
