= Col de Santo Stefano =

Mountain pass in Corsica, France

- Bocca di San Stefanu (Corsican)
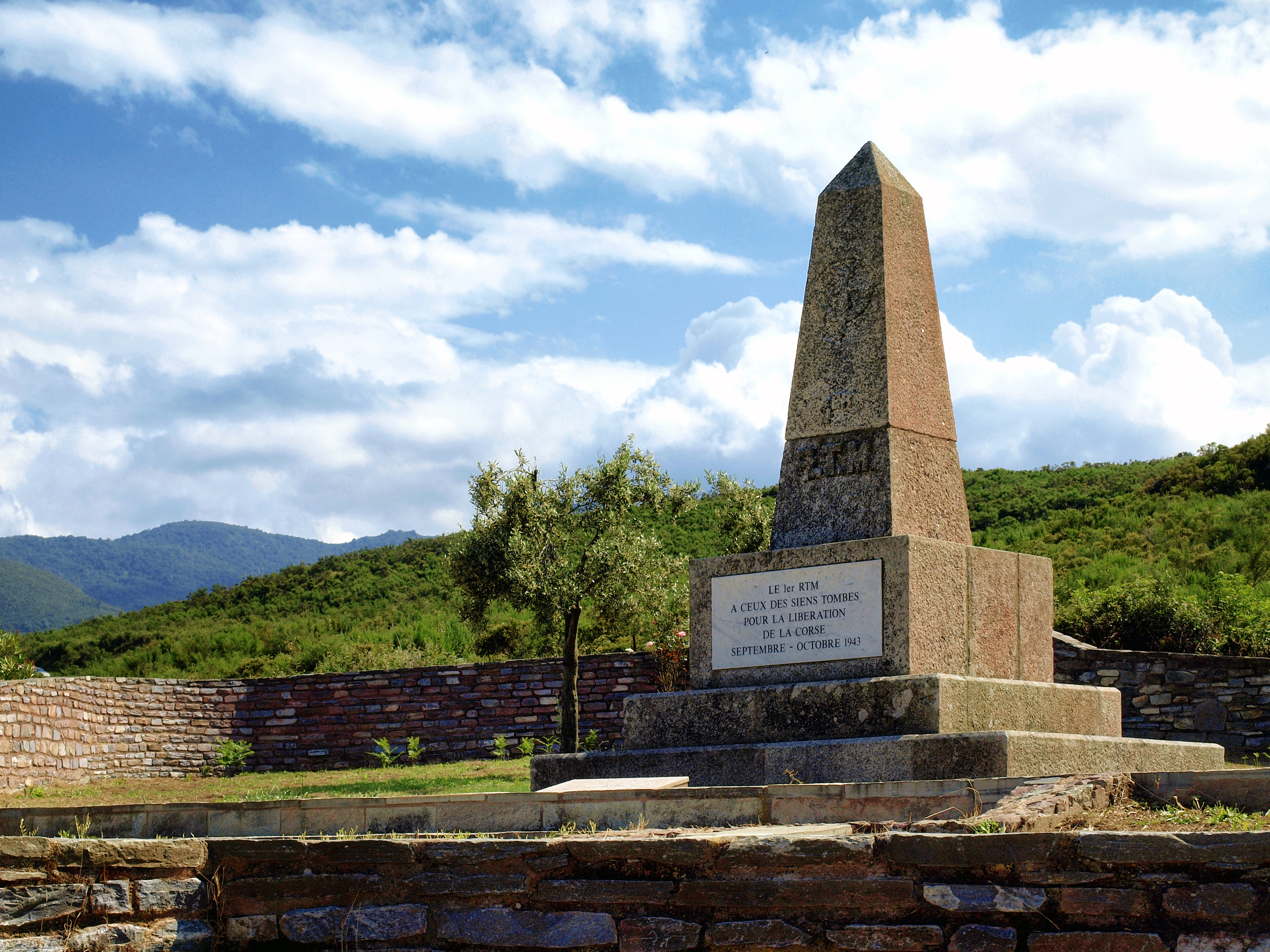
- 1st RTM Memorial at Santo Stefano Pass

- Location within Corsica Location within France
- Elevation: 368 metres (1,207 ft)

First Approach
- Length: 12 kilometres (7.5 mi)
- Ascent from: Saint-Florent (northwest)

Second Approach
- Length: 8 kilometres (5.0 mi)
- Ascent from: Biguglia, Bevinco valley (east)

Third Approach
- Range: Monte Stello Massif / Monte Astu Massif
- Coordinates: 42°36′01″N 9°21′34″E

The Col de Santo Stefano (Note: The name is also written as Santo Stephano or San Stafano) Corsican: Bocca di San Stefanu) is a mountain pass in the Haute-Corse department of Corsica, France. It is one of the main passes in Corsica, running between the massifs of Monte Stello to the north and Monte Astu to the south. It provides a route from the Saint-Florent region to the northwest and Biguglia in the eastern coastal plain.

== Location ==
The Santo Stefano pass is to the south of the Serra, the medium-sized mountain range of Cap Corse constituting the Monte Stello Massif, which is the watershed line of the Mediterranean Sea and the Tyrrhenian Sea. It is in the south of the municipality of Olmeta-di-Tuda, about 320 metres (1,050 ft) (orthodromic distance) from Murato. Due to its geographical position – it separates the Nebbio from the Marana plain – it is an important military strategic point. As such, it has been the scene of battles at several times.

== Geology and relief ==
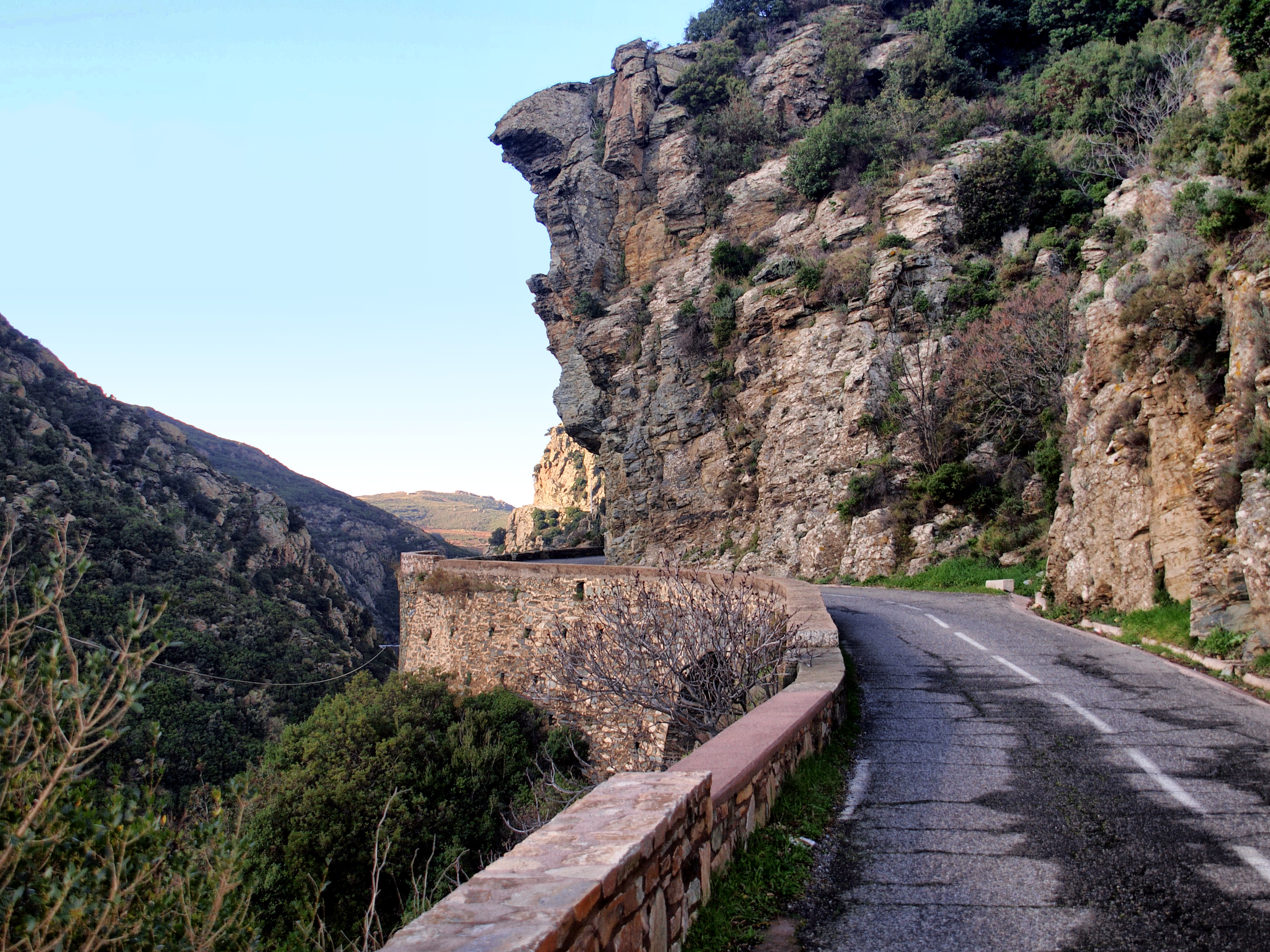
D62 road in the defile of Lancone

The Santo Stefano pass is located in "Schist Corsica" in the northeast of the island, south of the Serra where, as Agostino Giustiniani writes, "this mountain chain which runs along the length of Cap Corse enters the Nebbio and extends to a rural church called S. Stefano, in the pieve of Rosolo, one of the three pieves of the Nebbio".

It separates the Monte Stello Massif from the Monte Astu Massif, and separates the Conca d'Oro or plain of Oletta microregion in the Nebbio from the Lancone microregion through which the Bevinco flows before entering the Étang de Biguglia. On its western slope, on the Nebbio side, is the stream of Lugo (it takes the name of stream of Campodata downstream). On the eastern side of the pass, is the defile of Lancone in the gorges of which the Bevinco river flows, skirted on its left bank by the road D62.

== Climate and vegetation ==
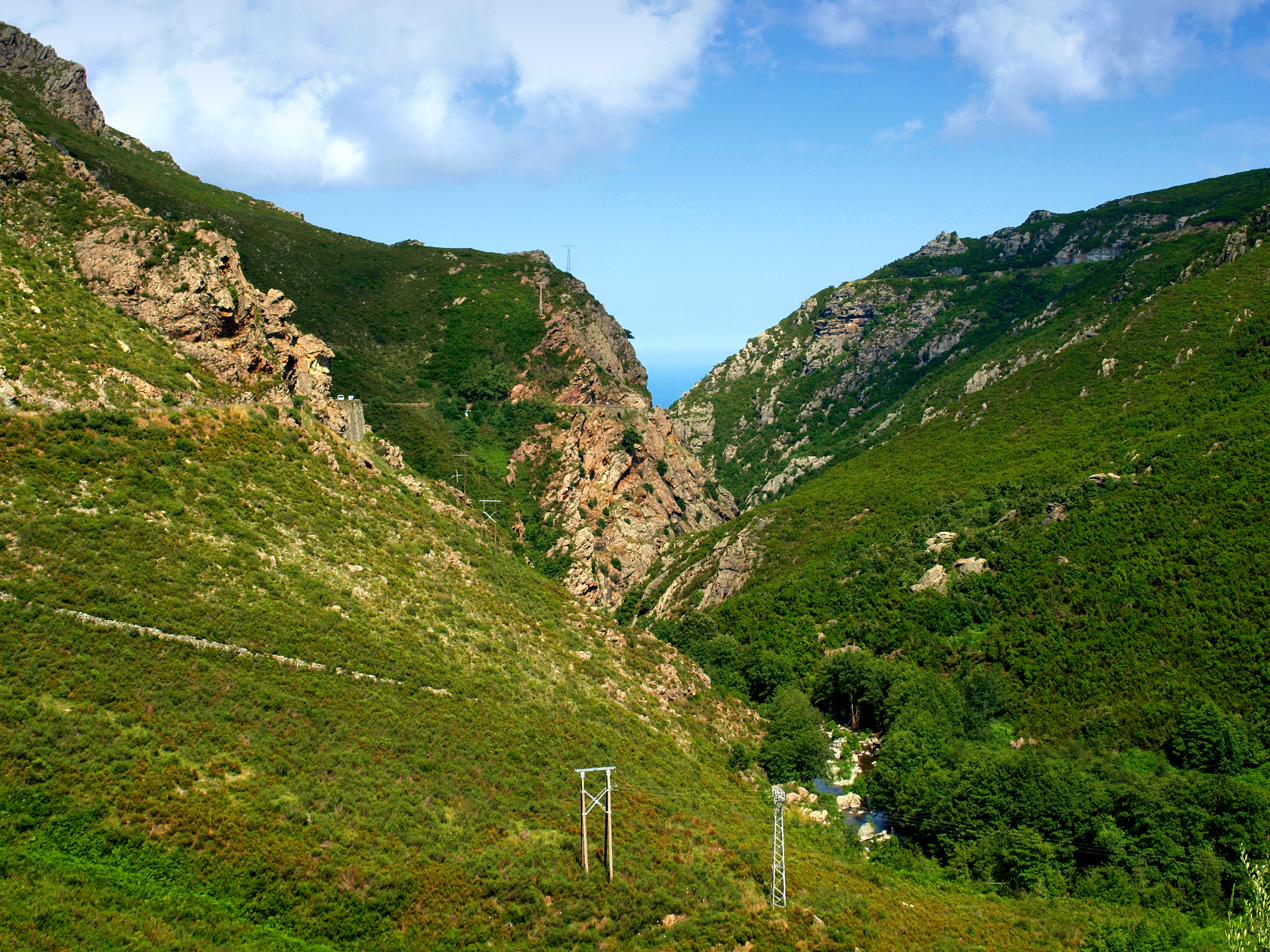
Bevinco gorges

Located 368 metres (1,207 ft) above sea level, to the east of the Nebbio basin, it is little affected by the strong westerly winds that sweep the Agriates and the Gulf of Saint-Florent. Unlike the Col de Teghime further north, it is rarely snowy in winter.

Its plant environment is almost desert. Its rocky slopes are covered with rare vegetation, a low and sparse maquis shrubland. The thickest groves (chestnut trees and holm oaks) are found when approaching the village of Olmeta-du-Tuda or heading towards Murato.

== Road junction ==
The Santo Stefano pass is an important crossroads for the micro-region. A roundabout has been created at the junction of the roads:

- D62 which connects Casatorra (Biguglia) to the D81 at the entrance to the Agriates desert. It is an old road, solid and cut into the rock but extremely narrow. Sometimes two light vehicles cannot pass. It is advisable to honk at each blind corner. The projecting rocks are marked with white paint (for small trucks and large motor homes).
- D82 which connects Saint-Florent to Numero Quattru (Ortale de Biguglia) on National Road 193; it is a recent road (late 1970s), wide enough for large semi-trailers but subject to landslides in periods of heavy storms and weather events in the Cevennes;
- D5, which starts from this junction and leads to Ponte Novu (Castello-di-Rostino) on the RN 193, via Murato, Bigorno and Lento. The Col de Boigorno section was still gravel in the 1990s.

== History ==
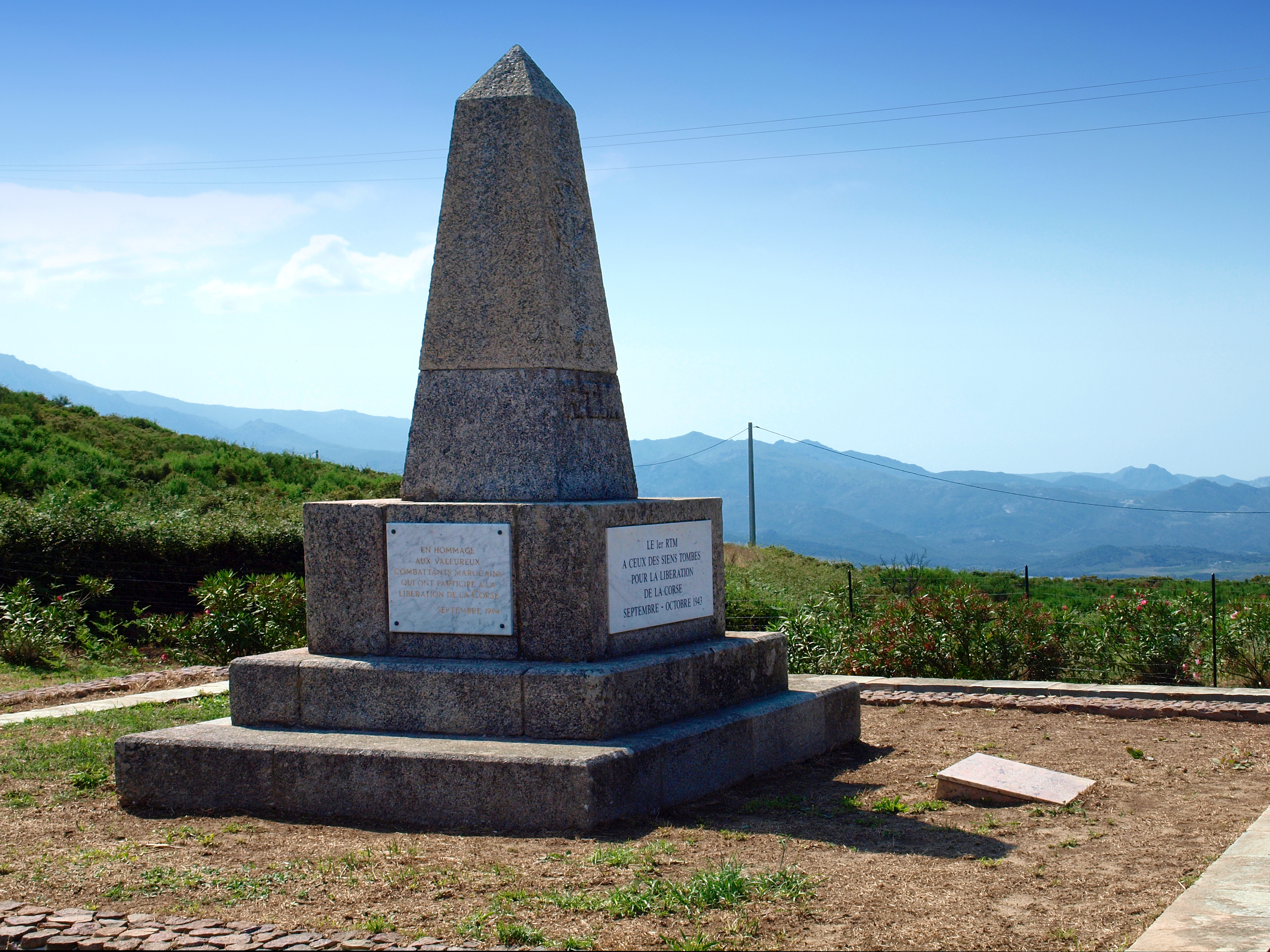
1st RTM Memorial at Santo Stefano Pass

Santo Stefano has always been a strategic military pass, like the other passes in the Nebbio mountain belt. The troops who often landed in the Gulf of Saint-Florent had to take the passes to get to the interior of the island. Among these passes, besides the main Bocca di Tenda and Col de Bigorno, there was Santo Stefano.

In 1735, the Genoese blocked the road to the Nationals who wanted to invest Capo Corso. They occupied Olmeta-di-Tuda, Barbaggio, Ortale and Lucciana, but suffer a heavy defeat at Furiani.

On 9 October 1768 all the available French troops left Bastia to go to the aid of the Borgu garrison, while Grandmaison attacked at Olmeta to create a diversion. The Battle of Borgo continued throughout the day. That night François Claude Chauvelin ordered a retreat and M. de Ludre had to capitulate. The French lost hundreds of dead, including two colonels and many officers, and a large number of wounded including Charles Louis de Marbeuf.

The most recent battle fought there was that of the skirmishers of the 1st battalion of the 1er R.T.M. on 30 September 1943. The San Stefano pass was defended by about fifty Germans with two 75mm guns. After liberating Rutali on 29 September, the next day at dawn after a fierce fight the Moroccan skirmishers of Captain Morand reached the pass and captured the eleven surviving S.S. The counter-attack of an enemy battalion was thrown back in the defile of Lancone.

== Sources ==
- Choury, Maurice, "Le col des goumiers", Tous Bandit d'honneur (in French), Ed. sociales
- "Col de Santo Stefano", geoportail (in French)
- Giustiniani, Mgr Agostino, "Dialogo nominato Corsica", Histoire de la Corse, Description de la Corse, vol. I, translated by Lucien Auguste Letteron
- Monti, Antoine-Dominique (1979), La Grande révolte des Corses contre Gênes 1729 - 1769, ADECEC Cervioni
- "Ruisseau de Campodata", Sandre (in French)
