= Col de Bigorno =

Mountain pass in Corsica, France

- Bocca di Bigornu
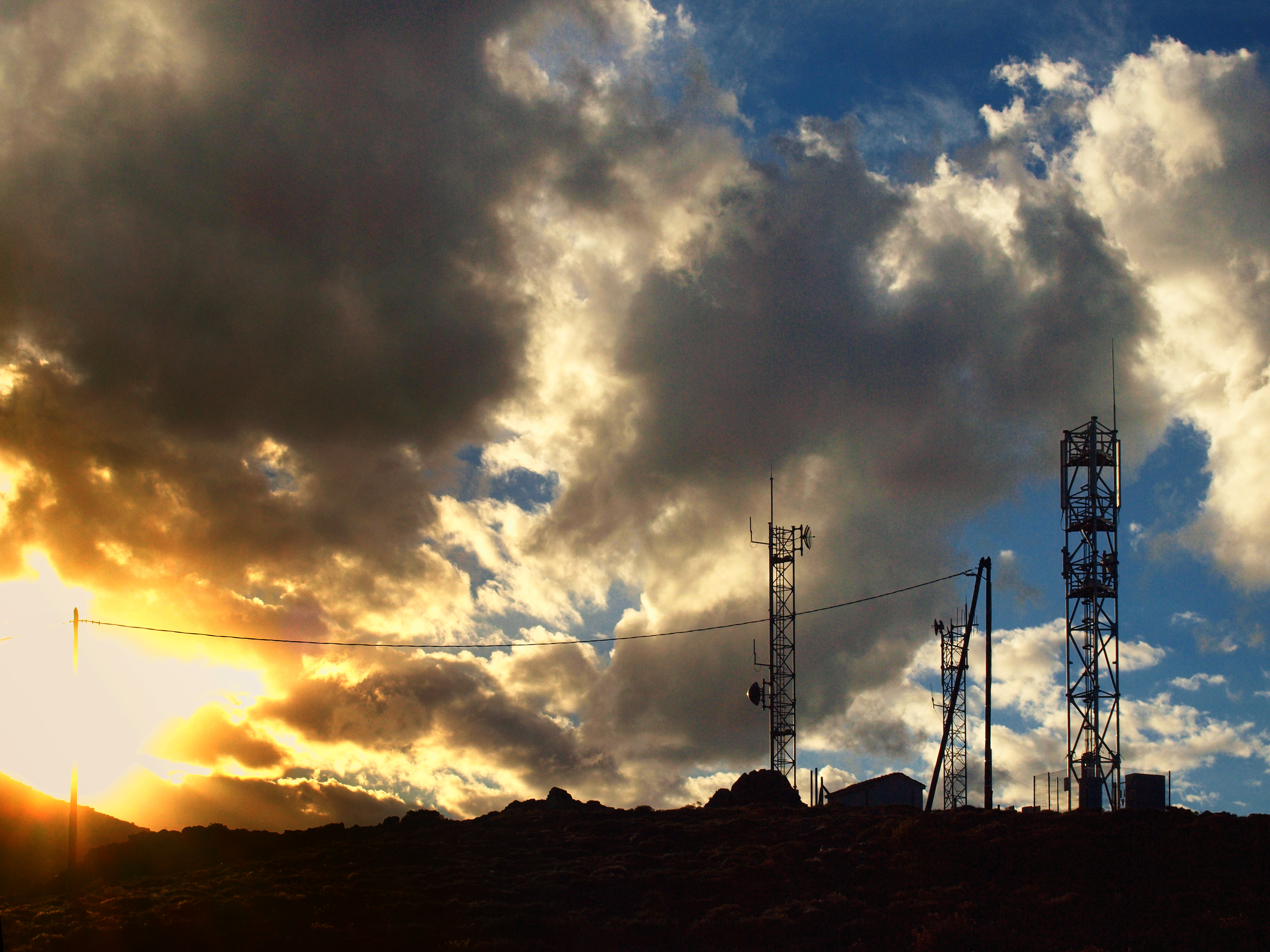
- View of the pass

- Location within Corsica Location within France
- Elevation: 885 metres (2,904 ft)

Third Approach
- Coordinates: 42°32′16″N 9°17′47″E

The Col de Bigorno Corsican: Bocca di Bigornu), or Bigorno Pass, is a mountain pass in the Haute-Corse department of Corsica, France.

== Location ==
The Col de Bigorno is a pass of the Serra di Tenda, a chain of schist mountains separating the Nebbio from the Ostriconi valley to the north, and the lower Golo valley to the south. It is on the southern secondary ridge of the Serra di Tenda, hinging at the level of the 1,372 metres (4,501 ft) Monte Tassu and oriented to the east then to the northeast until the Lancone gorge. The rocks were formed in the Early Cretaceous.

In an immediate environment, the section of the mountain range separates two valleys:

- to the north, that of the Bussu stream, a tributary of the Bevinco river which flows into the Étang de Biguglia
- to the south, that of the Sretta stream, a tributary of the Sanguinelli stream which feeds the Golo

== Climate and vegetation ==
The Col de Bigorno is subject to strong north and north-westerly winds (mistral and tramontane trains). The pass is at 885 metres (2,904 ft) altitude. It is snow-covered for several days in winter.

The environment is almost desert. The rocky slopes are covered with rare vegetation, a low and sparse maquis. It is in the Massif du Tenda et Monte Astu zone naturelle d'intérêt écologique, faunistique et floristique. The area is favorable to extensive livestock farming, which is likely to increase. Grazing promotes the maintenance of open environments favorable to biodiversity and the fight against fires.

Thyme of Corsica grows among the rocks. (Note: Thymus herba-barona is not found in France except in Corsica, where it is called thym de Corse.)

== Means of communication ==
The D5 road which connects the Col de Santo Stefano to the national road 193 in Ponte-Novu, goes through the Col de Bigorno to cross the ridge line. Electricity and telecommunications pylons are installed above the D5 road.

== History ==
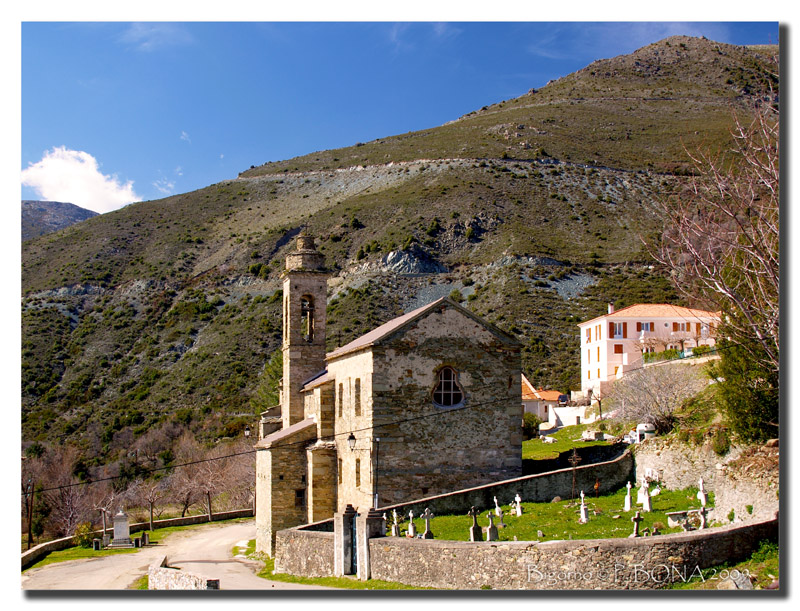
Église Santa-Maria-Assunta in the Col de Bigorno

Formerly, as evidenced by the Genoese bridges in the town of Murato, the Col de Bigorno was a route for peddlers and transhumant shepherds. They also took the neighboring 1,028 metres (3,373 ft) Col de Vadellaia, located on an important path linking the hamlets of Bigorno and the Nebbio and passing the Romanesque chapel of Sant 'Agostino de Locchia (around the second half of the 12th century) located at 600 metres (2,000 ft) southwest of Montechiaro Tower. (Note: The tower of Montechiaro is mentioned for the first time in 1247. It belonged to a small lineage bearing the same name as the fortification.)

Like the Tenda and Lento passes, the strategic position of the Bigorno pass has made it an important military passage and place of fighting for a very long time. Troops of various nationalities who disembarked in the Gulf of Saint-Florent crossed it and then went to the interior of the island.

In 1732, at the end of April, the imperial German troops stationed at Saint-Florent, led by Samuel von Schmettau, occupied the Nebbio then the coast to Tenda and Lento.

In 1739, the count of Maillebois, at the head of the French troops of Corsica, began a campaign and decided to bear arms in the mountainous cantons of the interior. The capture of Lento and Bigorno ensured the almost complete occupation of the valley of Golo. On 2 June the French maréchal de camp Du Rousset de Girenton, who left Bastia during the night, attacked the Bocca San Ghjacumu and the heights of Tenda and Lentu. Maillebois left Bastia and made his base in Costere (Campitello) where, after Tenda and Bigorno, Lento, held by Ghjacomu Paoli, capitulated on 3 June.

On 1 May 1769 Pasquale Paoli, who had established his headquarters in Murato, had his Corsican militias occupy the heights of Tenda which controlled the valleys of Aliso, Ostriconi and Golo. At dawn on 5 May Noël Jourda de Vaux and his deputy Lieutenant-General de Bourcet commanded the general offensive of the French troops. The Chevalier de Viomesnil captured Bigorno. On 8 May the Corsicans launched an assault on Lento and Bocca San Ghjacumu. They unsettled the French and felt that victory was within their reach, but Paoli, who was overseeing operations from a height on the other side of the Golu, neglected to protect the flanks. Two French columns came out of Bigorno and Canavaggia. The Corsicans, taken from the rear, were forced into a disorderly retreat towards the Golo bridge under the plunging fire of French arms. On the other side of the Golo, Gentili, obeying the orders received, refused the passage of the bridge until Paoli ordered him to withdraw. The combat ended in the greatest confusion when night fell.

== Sources ==
- Colonna de Cesari-Rocca; Louis Villat (1916), Histoire de Corse, Paris: Furne, Boivin & Cie
- Istria, Daniel (2005), Pouvoirs et fortifications dans le nord de la Corse xie siècle – xive siècle, Ajaccio: Éditions Alain Piazzola
- "Massif du Tenda et Monte Astu", Inventaire national du patrimoine naturel (INPN) (in French)
- Monti, Antoine Dominique (1979), La grande révolte des Corses contre Gênes 1729-1769, Cervioni: ADECEC
- "Ruisseau de Bussu", Sandre (in French)
- "Ruisseau de Sanguinelli", Sandre (in French)
- "Ruisseau de Sretta", Sandre (in French)
