= Bevinco =

River in the department of Haute-Corse, Corsica

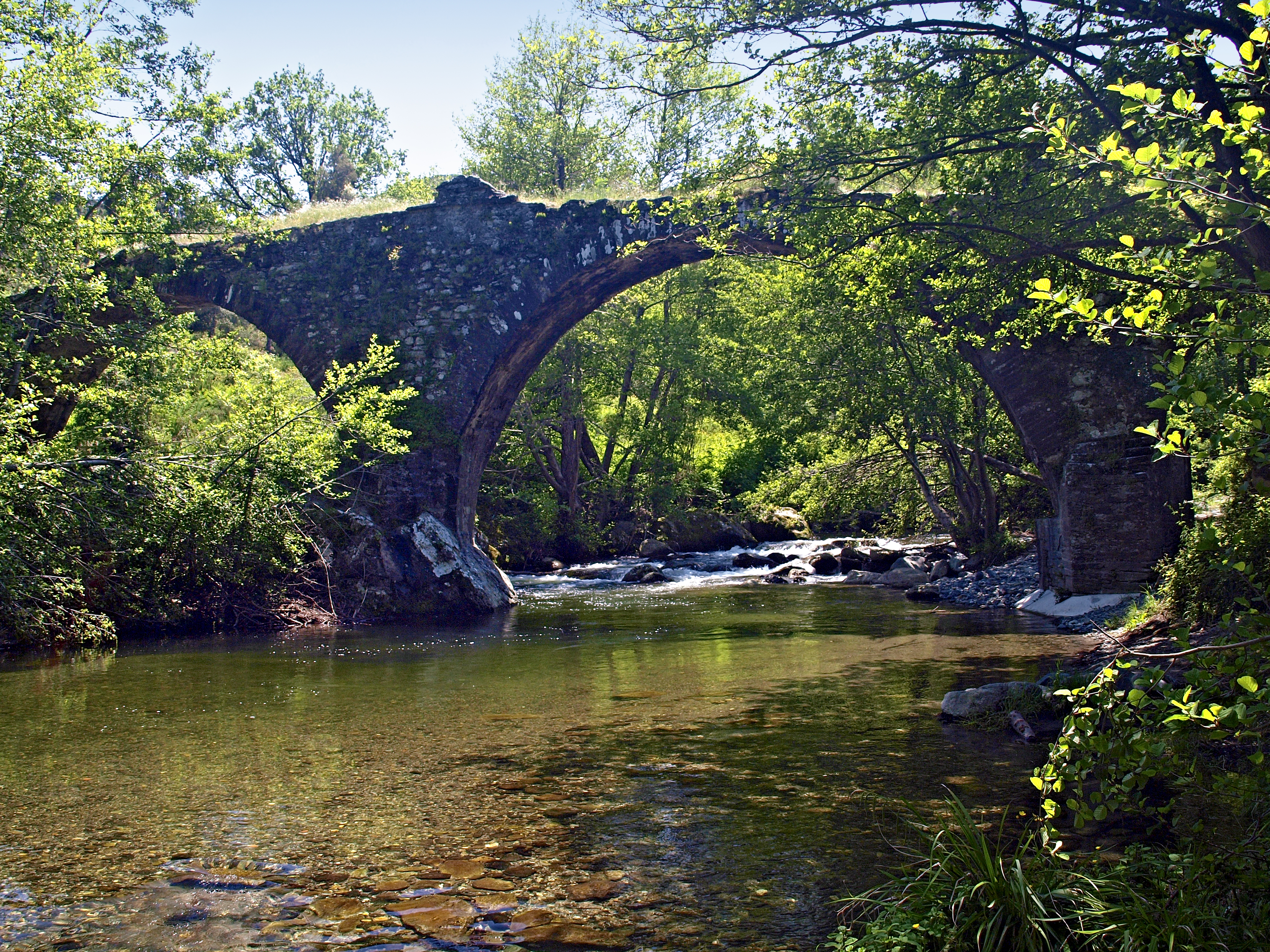
- Murato - Genoese bridge of Torreno

- Location within Corsica Location within France

Location
- Country: France
- Region: Corsica
- Department: Haute-Corse

Physical characteristics
- Mouth: Étang de Biguglia
  - location: Tyrrhenian Sea
  - coordinates: 42.6597°N 9.4503°E
- Length: 31.23 kilometres (19.41 mi)
- Discharge
  - average: 0.697 cubic metres per second (24.6 cu ft/s)

The Bevinco is a small river in the northeast of the Haute-Corse department on the French island of Corsica. It is the main tributary of the Étang de Biguglia, the largest wetland in Corsica.

== Location ==
The Bevinco is 31.23 kilometres (19.41 mi) long. It rises on the eastern slopes of the 1,469 metres (4,820 ft) Monte Reghia di Pozzo. It flows in a northeast direction past Murato and Biguglia to enter the Étang de Biguglia, a coastal lagoon protected as a nature reserve, which drains into the Mediterranean Sea through its north end. The Bevinco is the main tributary of the lagoon. It crosses the communes of Bigorno, Biguglia, Furiani, Lento, Murato, Olmeta-di-Tuda, Piève, Rutali and Vallecalle.

== Hydrology ==
Measurement of the water flow were made between 1960 and 2021 at the Olmeta-di-Tuda [Lancone] station. The watershed at this point covers 65.6 square kilometres (25.3 sq mi). Annual precipitation was calculated as 412 millimetres (16.2 in). The average flow of water throughout the year was 0.697 cubic metres per second (24.6 cu ft/s).

Average flow (cubic meters per second) by month for the period 1960 to 2021
| Month | Flow |
|---|---|
| Jan | 1.090 |
| Feb | 1.340 |
| Mar | 1.400 |
| Apr | 1.040 |
| May | 0.723 |
| Jun | 0.302 |
| Jul | 0.118 |
| Aug | 0.087 |
| Sep | 0.135 |
| Oct | 0.435 |
| Nov | 0.714 |
| Dec | 1.030 |

== Tributaries ==
The following streams (ruisseaux) are tributaries of the Bevinco:

- Pietre Turchine (13 km)
  - Rasignani (11 km)
    - Mormorana (11 km)
    - Petriccia (6 km)
    - La Serra (3 km)
  - Melo (1 km)
    - Tragone (2 km)
- San Pancrazio (7 km)
- Sant'Agata (6 km)
  - Santa Lucia (4 km)
- Guadone (6 km)
  - Bonmartino (5 km)
    - Morticcione (1 km)
- Felicione (4 km)
  - Fiuraccia (2 km)
  - Prato (2 km)
  - Tricchiato (1 km)
- la Merla (4 km)
  - la Menta (5 km)
- Nepita (3 km)
  - Capia (3 km)
    - Tasso (2 km)
- Petrelle (3 km)
- Fangone (3 km)
- Sant'Andrea (3 km)
- Torreno (2 km)
  - Padula (1 km)
- Forci (2 km)
- Cipetto (2 km)
- Sualello (2 km)
- Tendigiola (2 km)
- Bussu (2 km)
- Monte Grosso (1 km)
- Forcalli (1 km)
- Forne (1 km)

== Gallery ==
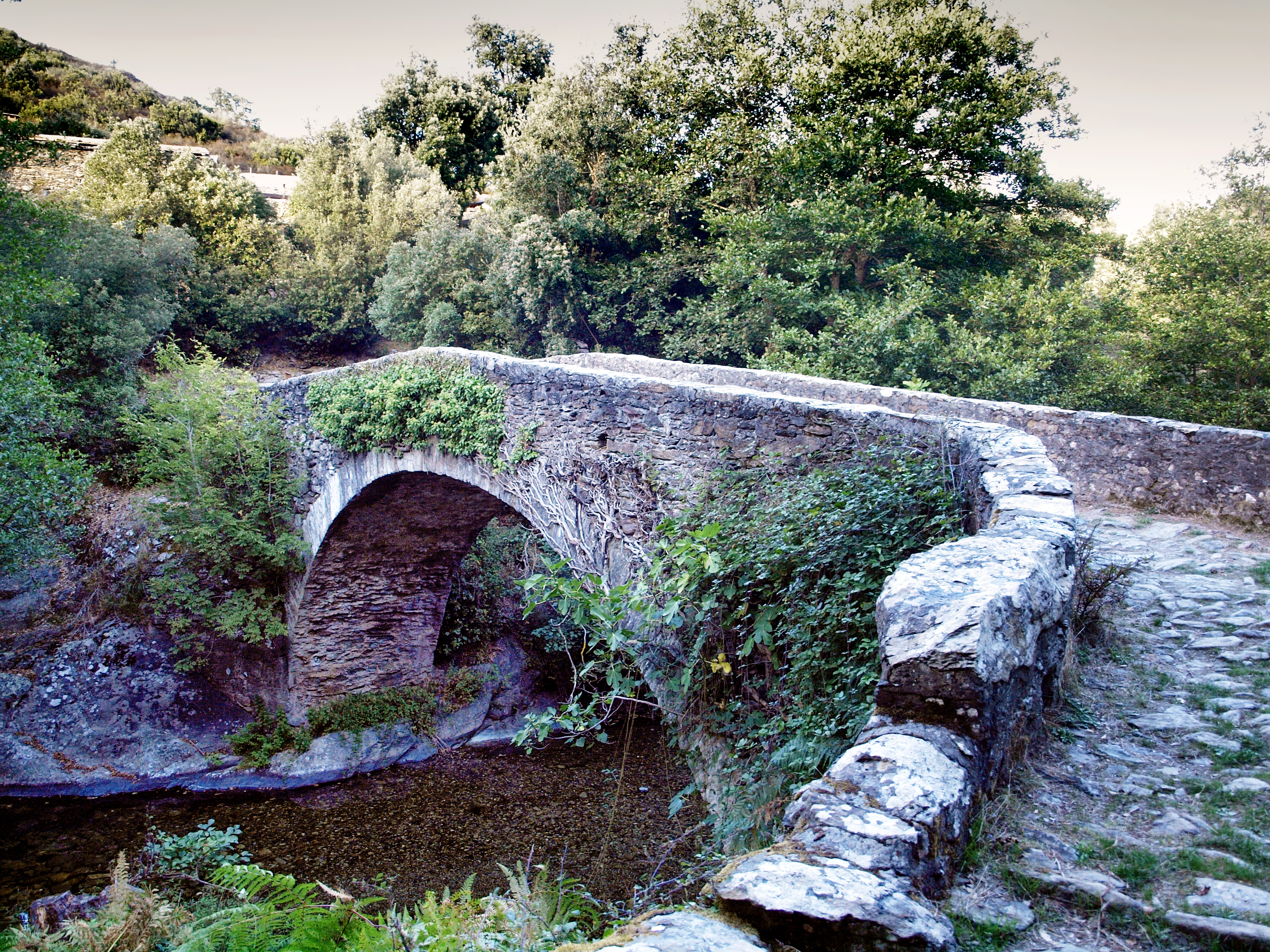
Murato, Genoese bridge over the Bevinco (527 m above sea level), 2nd bridge of Santa Lucia,

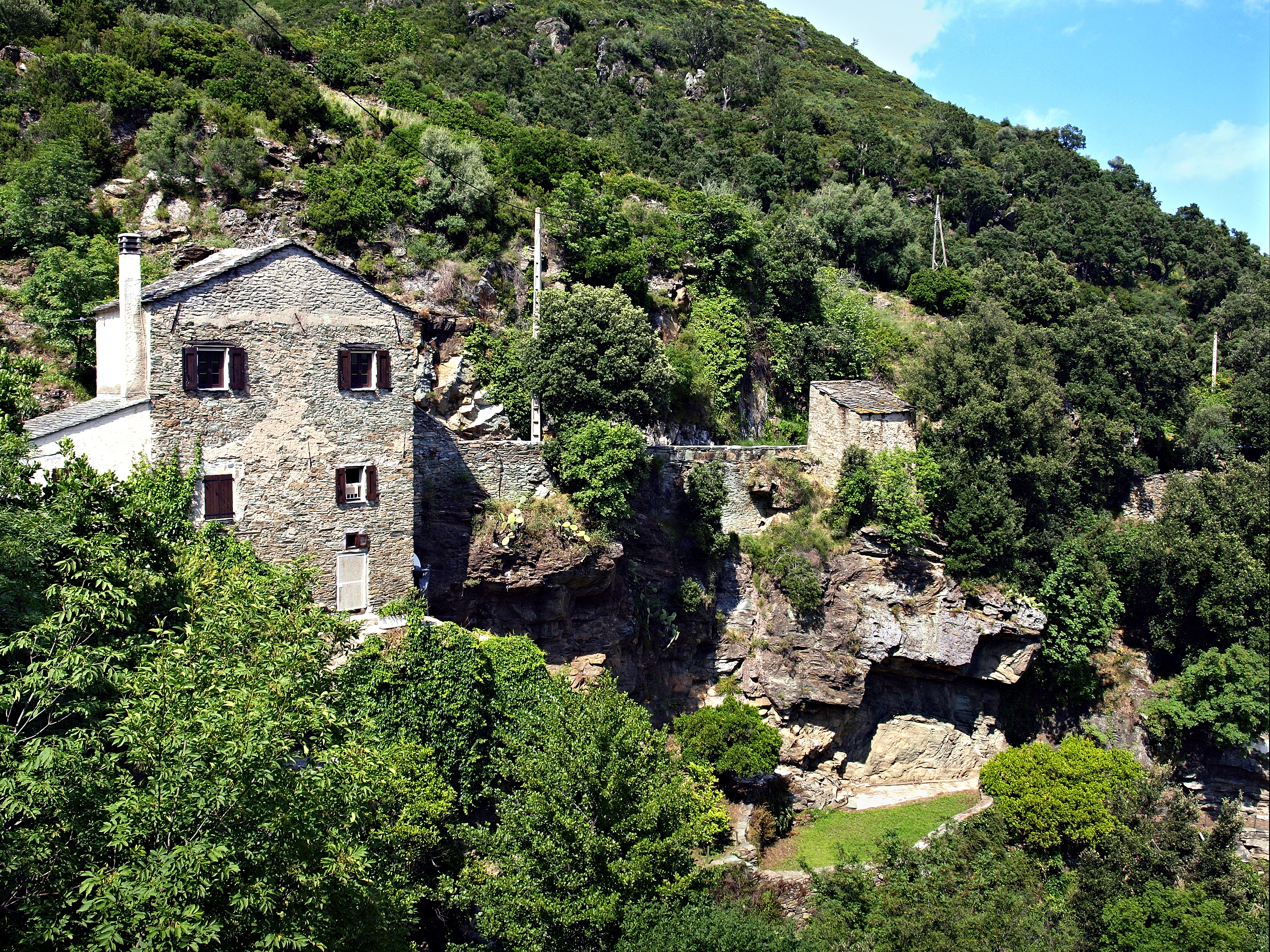
Defile of Lancone

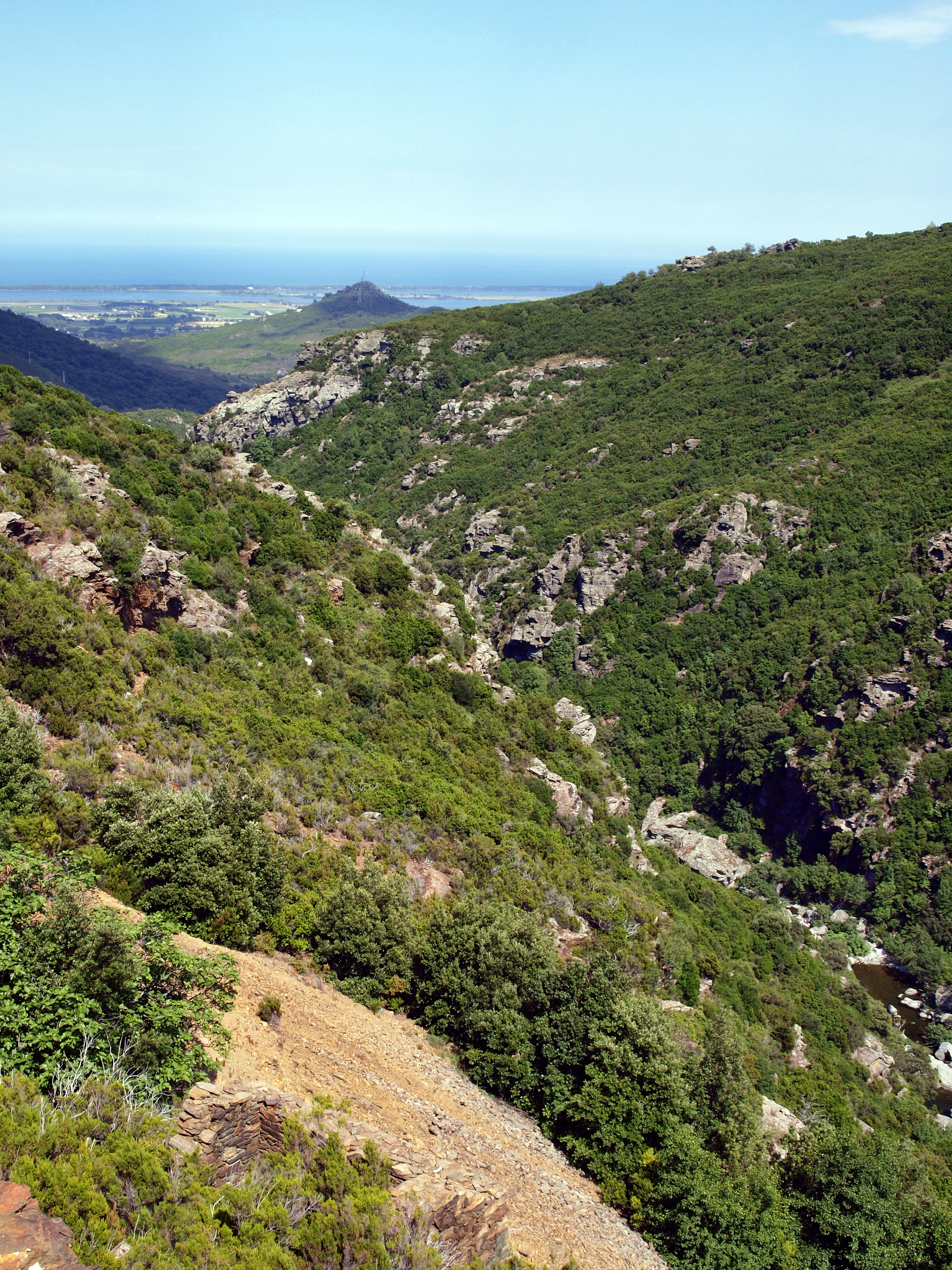
Bevinco downstream from Lancone. Buguglia lagoon in the distance

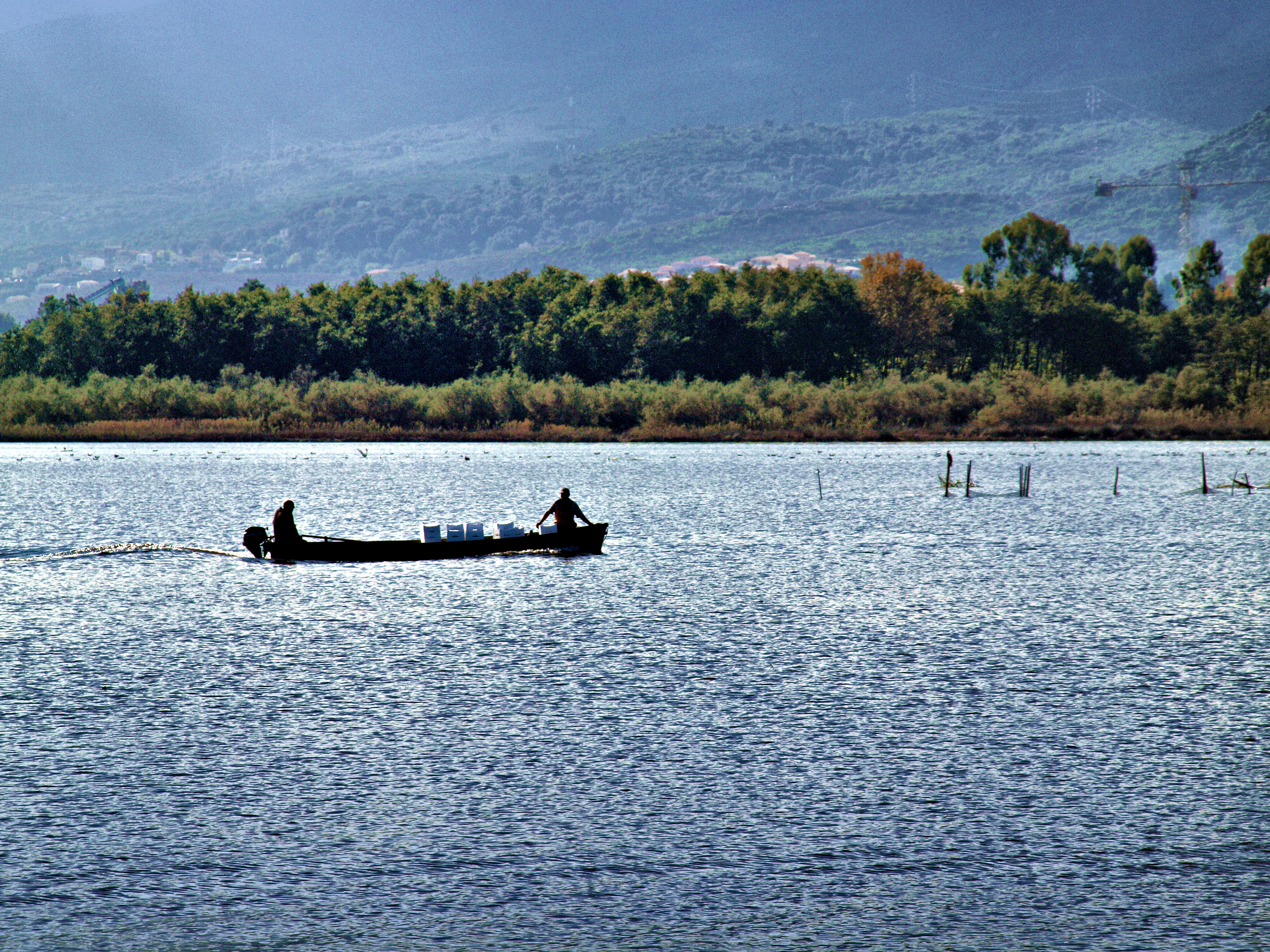
Fisherman on the Étang de Biguglia

== Sources ==
- "Le Bevinco à Olmeta-di-Tuda [Lancone]", eaufrance (in French), © Ministère de l'Ecologie, du Développement Durable et de l'Energie, 2015
- "Le Bevinco", Sandre (in French), Service d'administration nationale des données et référentiels sur l'eau
- "Relation: Le Bevinco (2887996)", OpenStreetMap
