= Aliso (river) =

Stream in the department of Haute-Corse, Corsica

Aliso River
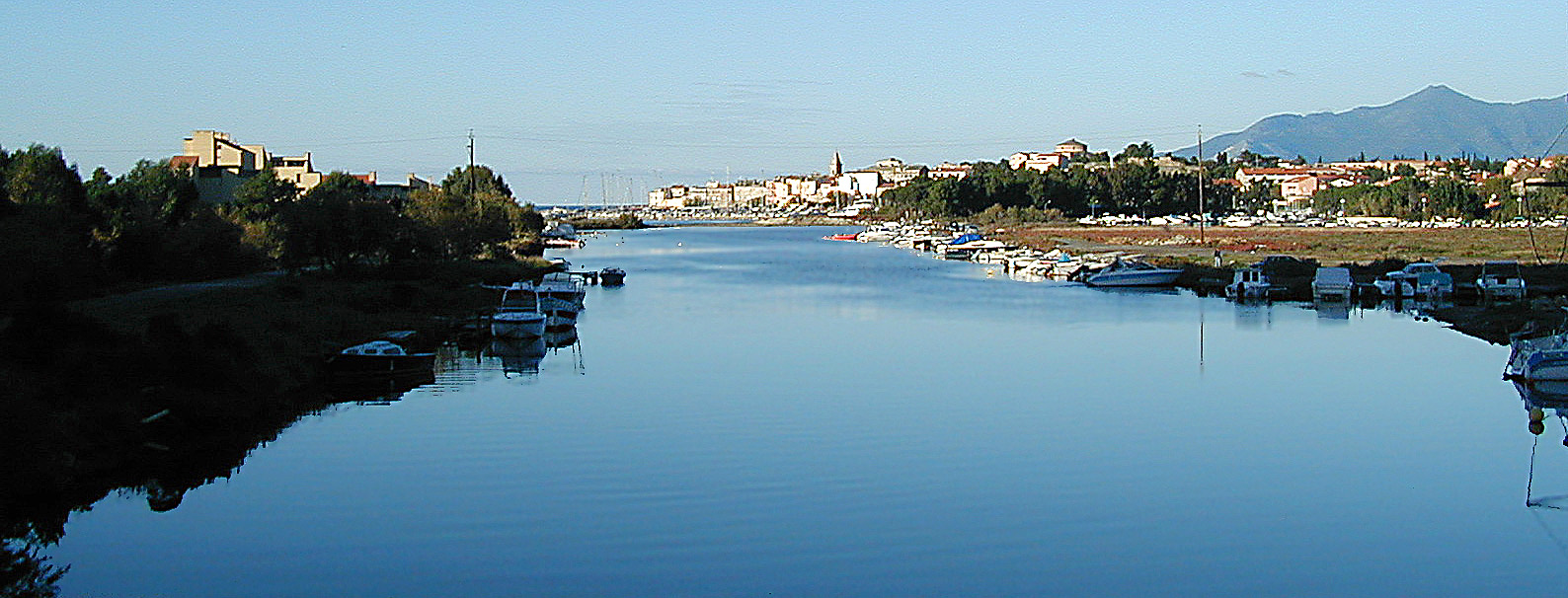
- The Aliso from the "Iron Bridge" (D81) in Saint-Florent

- Location within Corsica Location within France
- Native name: Rivière l'Aliso (French)

Location
- Country: France
- Region: Corsica
- Department: Haute-Corse

Physical characteristics
- Mouth: Mediterranean Sea
  - location: Saint-Florent
  - coordinates: 42.6786°N 9.3017°E

The Aliso River (French pronunciation: [alizo]) is a small coastal river in the department of Haute-Corse, Corsica, France.

== Course ==
The Aliso is 20.51 kilometres (12.74 mi) long. Its source is at an elevation of 1,172 metres (3,845 ft). It rises to the south of the 1,509 metres (4,951 ft) Cima di Grimaseta and flows northeast and then north to the Mediterranean Sea at Saint-Florent. The river crosses the communes of Oletta, Olmeta-di-Tuda, Piève, Rapale, Sorio, Saint-Florent, San-Gavino-di-Tenda and Santo-Pietro-di-Tenda.

== Hydrology ==
Measurements of the river flow were taken at the Oletta [Malpergo] station from 1972 to 1996. The watershed above this station covers 68.6 square kilometres (26.5 sq mi). Annual precipitation was calculated as 266 millimetres (10.5 in). The average flow of water throughout the year was 0.577 cubic metres per second (20.4 cu ft/s).

Average flow (cubic meters per second) by month for the period 1979 to 1999
Month	Flow
Jan	1.010
Feb	1.260
Mar	1.200
Apr	1.150
May	0.577
Jun	0.208
Jul	0.076
Aug	0.039
Sep	0.079
Oct	0.151
Nov	0.579
Dec	0.651

== Tributaries ==
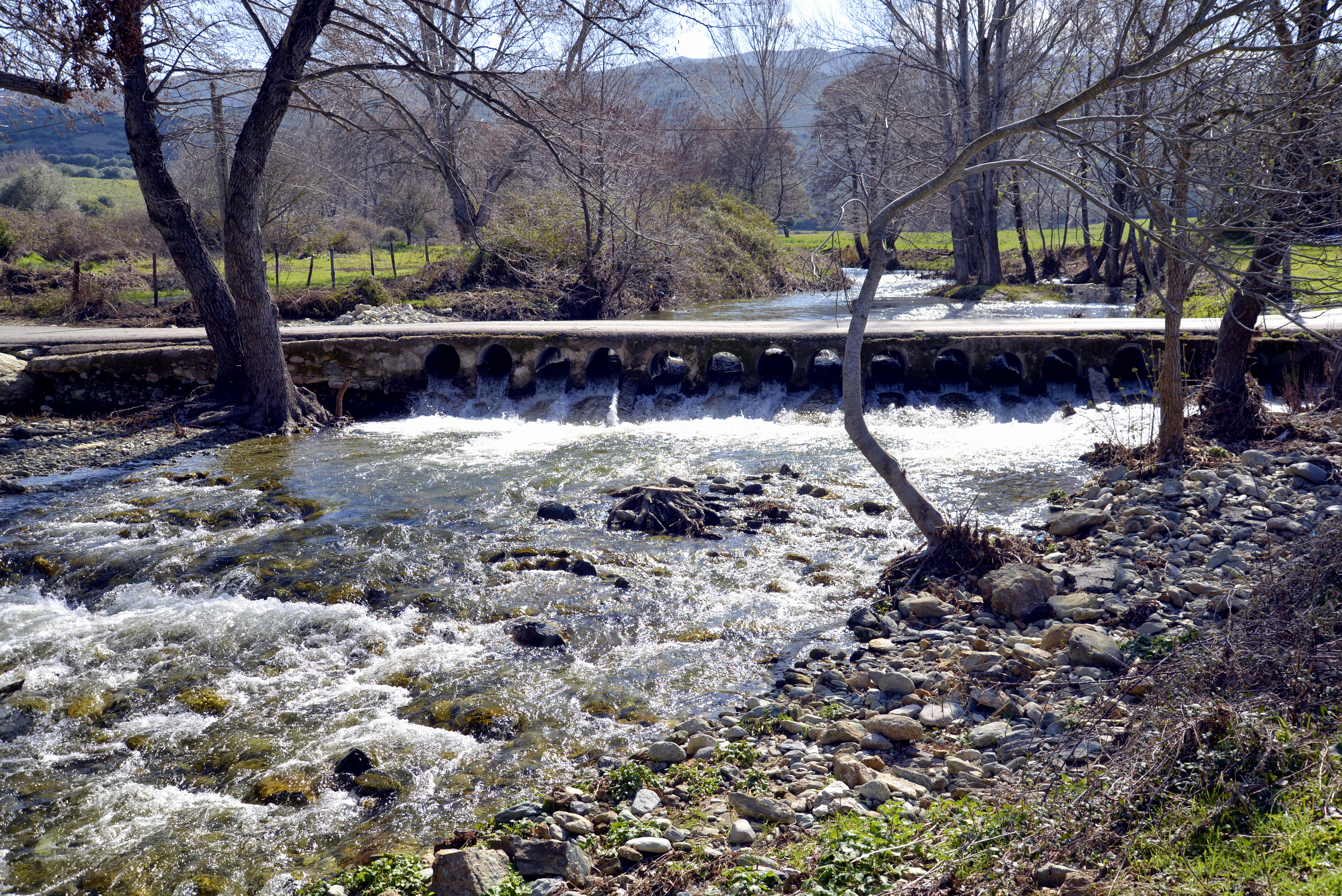
The Aliso at Ghjuncaja

The following streams (ruisseaux) are tributaries of the Aliso, ordered by length, and sub-tributaries:

- la Concia (9 km)
  - Mercurio (2 km)
  - Loto (2 km)
  - Lenza Longa (2 km)
- Salinelle (8 km)
  - Valdo (5 km)
  - Campodata (4 km)
    - Gué San Nicolao (4 km)
  - Furmicaiola (4 km)
    - Mondole Bianco (2 km)
    - Vomera (2 km)
  - Lenze (2 km)
    - Cicendolle (3 km)
    - Aghiola (1 km)
- Salti (8 km)
  - Leccia Torta (1 km)
- Porraghia (8 km)
  - Valdu a u Mulinu (4 km)
    - Callane (3 km)
    - Tettole (3 km)
    - Corti Maio (2 km)
      - Parata u a Carcu (2 km)
    - Vaccaia (2 km)
  - Perchia (3 km)
    - Pedilama (1 km)
  - Capina (2 km)
  - Vaccario (1 km)
  - Agnani (1 km)
- Fiumicellu (7 km)
  - Lavandaio (2 km)
- Morello (5 km)
  - Pilocaccio (2 km)
- Stollu (4 km)
- Campucassu (4 km)
  - Piedi Gatta (2 km)
- di Pétricali (3 km)
- Ficapenta (3 km)
  - Carpiniccia (3 km)
  - Codiglione (1 km)
- Furnelli (2 km)
- Canne (2 km)
- Spelonca (2 km)

== Sources ==
- "L'Aliso à Oletta [Malpergo]", eaufrance (in French), © Ministère de l'Ecologie, du Développement Durable et de l'Energie, 2015
- "L'Aliso", Sandre (in French), Service d'administration nationale des données et référentiels sur l'eau
- "Relation: L'Aliso (8472974)", OpenStreetMap
