= San Michele de Murato =

Church in Haute-Corse, France

Coordinates: 42°34′45″N 9°19′44″E

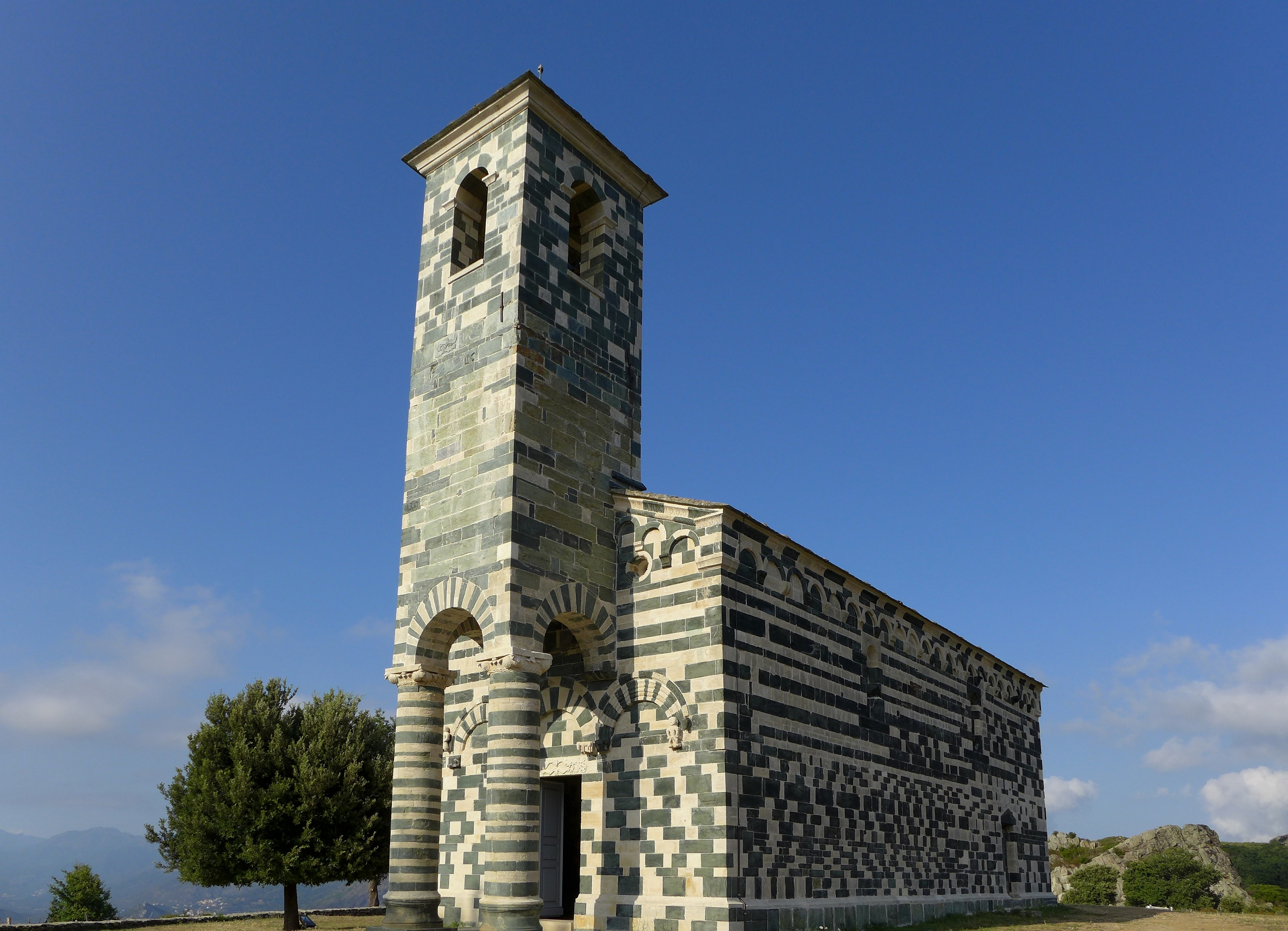
San Michele de Murato church

San Michele de Murato (Corsican: San Michele di Muratu, French: Saint-Michel de Murato) is a church in Murato, Haute-Corse, Corsica. The building was classified as a Historic Monument in 1840.
