= Église Saint-Césaire de Rapale =

Church in Haute-Corse, France

Coordinates: 42°35′25″N 9°18′07″E

Église Saint-Césaire de Rapale is a Roman Catholic church in Rapale, Haute-Corse, Corsica. The building was classified as a Historic Monument in 1840.
