= Canton of Biguglia-Nebbio =

Coordinates: 42.62°N 9.44°E

The canton of Biguglia-Nebbio is an administrative division of the Haute-Corse department, southeastern France. It was created at the French canton reorganisation which came into effect in March 2015. Its seat is in Biguglia.

It consists of the following communes:

1. Barbaggio
2. Biguglia
3. Murato
4. Oletta
5. Olmeta-di-Tuda
6. Piève
7. Poggio-d'Oletta
8. Rapale
9. Rutali
10. Saint-Florent
11. San-Gavino-di-Tenda
12. Santo-Pietro-di-Tenda
13. Sorio
14. Vallecalle
