= Étang de Biguglia =

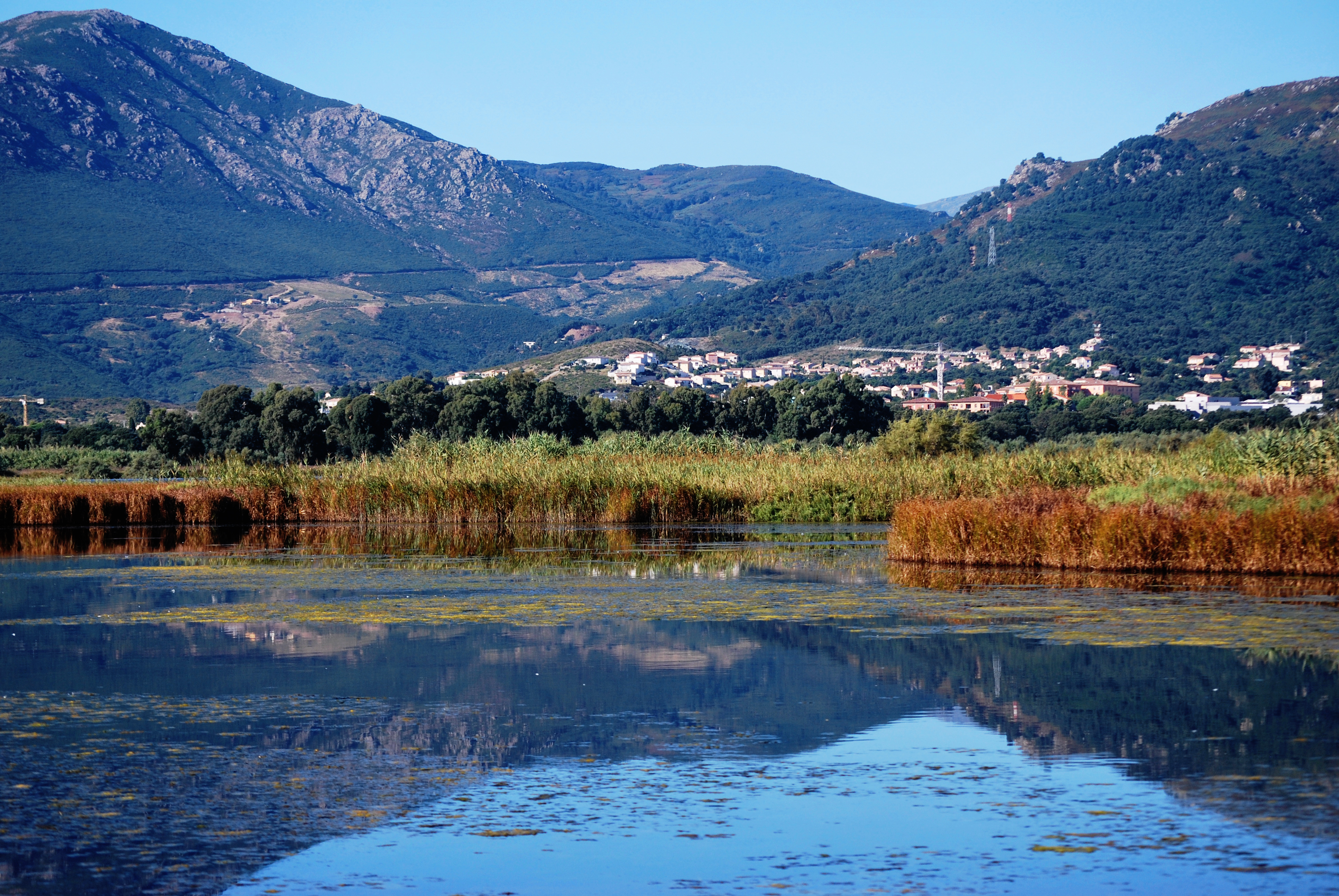
- Open water and reed beds

- Location within Corsica Location within France
- Coordinates: 42.6246°N 9.4649°E
- Type: Lagoon
- Primary inflows: Bevinco, Pietre Turchine, Rasignani and Golo
- Primary outflows: Mediterranean Sea
- Catchment area: 170 square kilometres (66 sq mi)
- Basin countries: Corsica, France
- Surface area: 1,790 hectares (4,400 acres)

The Étang de Biguglia (Note: Étang may be translated as "pond" or "lagoon".) (or Étang de Chjurlinu; called Stagnu di Biguglia or Stagnu di Chjurlinu in Corsican) is a shallow coastal lagoon in the department of Haute-Corse on the French island of Corsica. The lagoon and surrounding reed beds are the largest wetland in Corsica, and are protected as a nature reserve. They are an important breeding and wintering site for waterbirds, and for some rare aquatic species. Commercial fishing is allowed, but is managed to prevent damage to the ecology.

== Location ==
The Étang de Biguglia is on the northeast coast of Corsica to the south of Bastia and north of the Bastia – Poretta Airport. The town of Biguglia is inland from the lagoon to the west. The lagoon and associated nature reserve lie in the communes of Furiani, Biguglia, Borgo and Lucciana.

== Physical ==
The Étang de Biguglia is a long, narrow lagoon that is separated from the Mediterranean Sea by a narrow bar. It formed over 6,000 years ago by reworking of the marine alluvium of the Golo river. It is shallow, with an average depth of 1 metre (3 ft 3 in). It contains a mix of salt water and fresh water. It is divided into two basins.

The Bevinco River enters from the west near the north end, and the lagoon has an outlet to the sea at the north end. Other tributaries are the Pietre Turchine, Rasignani and Golo. The Golo river today enters the sea a few kilometres south of the lagoon, but a canal connects the southern end of the lagoon to the Golo close to its mouth.

The wetland covers 1,790 hectares (4,400 acres), including 1,450 hectares (3,600 acres) of open water, and covers most of the Marana plain. The surrounding land is drained and used for agriculture, but is seasonally flooded. The watershed has an area of 170 square kilometres (66 sq mi) and has many industrial, commercial and tourist establishments.

== Nature reserve ==
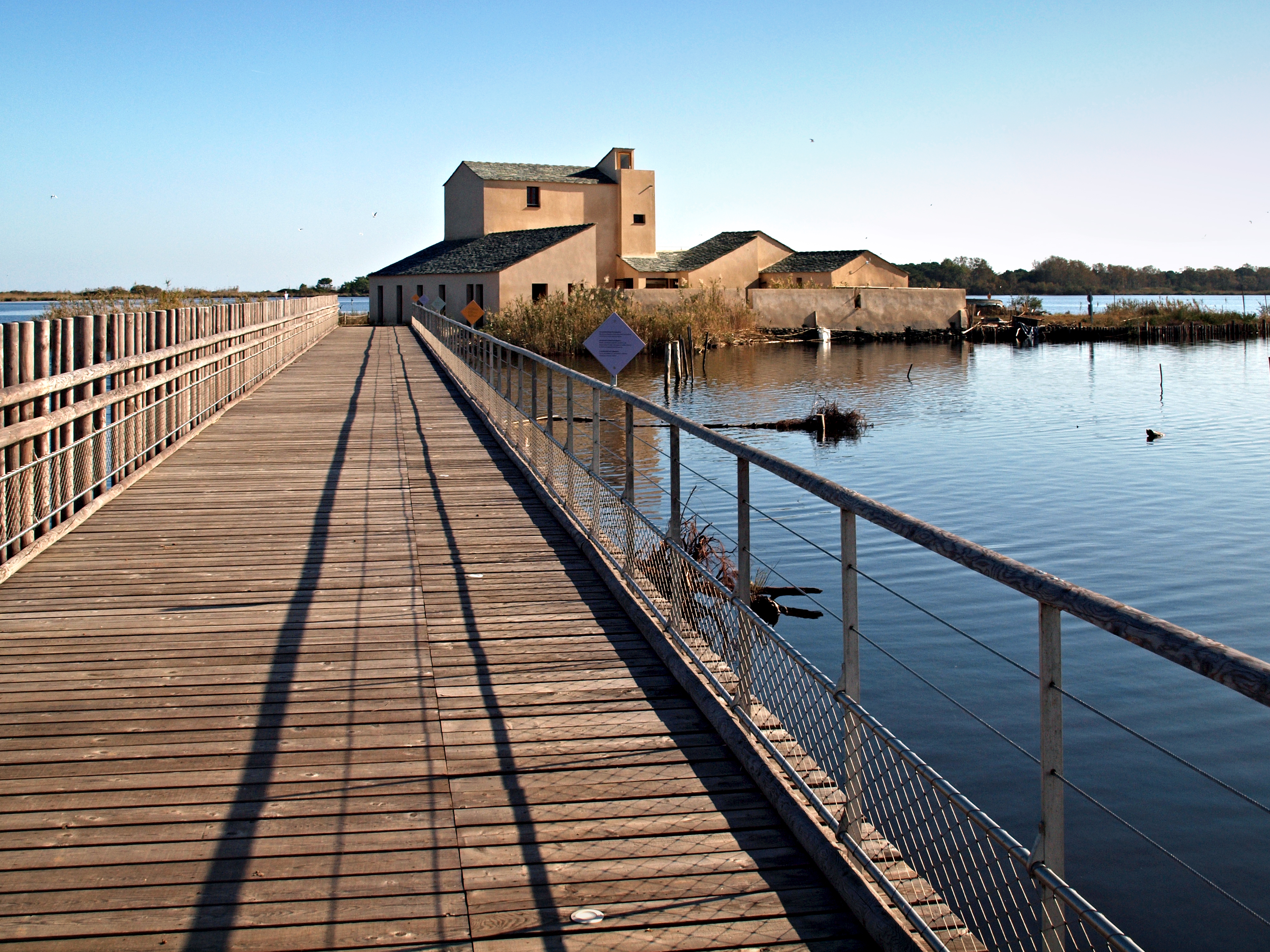
Écomusée du Fortin

In 1991 the site was recognized as being of international importance as a habitat for water birds, particularly coot, pochard and tufted duck. The Réserve Naturelle de l’Étang de Biguglia was classified as a nature reserve in 1994 and is managed by the Collectivité de Corse. It is classed as a type 1 Zone naturelle d'intérêt écologique, faunistique et floristique (ZNIEFF), and as a European Union Natura 2000 site. A fortress built when Corsica was under Genoan rule on the Ischia Nova islet in the reserve now houses an eco-museum.

The protected area contains shrub-dominated wetlands with creeks leading into open water. Vegetation includes salt-tolerant species of underwater plants, reed beds and maquis shrubland. There are about 240 species of fish, birds, amphibians, reptiles and insects. Large numbers of grebes, cormorants, ducks, geese and swans breed and winter in the reserve, which is also home to reptiles such as Hermann's tortoise (Testudo hermanni) and mammals such as long-fingered bat (Myotis capaccinii). The critically endangered European eel (Anguilla anguilla) use the lagoon for spawning and nursery. European pond turtles live in the drainage channels of the west and south banks of the lagoon. Illegal hunting is a threat to the ecology.

== Fishing ==
Professional fishermen continue to exploit the lagoon, taking almost 100 tonnes each year, but follow a management plan that prevents over-fishing. 20% of the water is off limits to fishing. Fish are caught using capétchade fish hoop traps, which mainly take eels that are on the move, particularly during migration, but also take big-scale sand smelt (Atherina boyeri). The traps are in fixed positions, but are usually raised every day. Pelagic fish are also caught at night with static gill nets 300 to 500 metres (980 to 1,640 ft) long, particularly in winter, and include commercially valuable species such as wolffish and sea bream. The nets are moved every day. In summer fish are also caught using gill nets about 500 metres (1,600 ft) long that encircle shoals of fish such as Mullet (Mugilidae), Anarhichas and Sand steenbras (Lithognathus mormyrus).

== Gallery ==
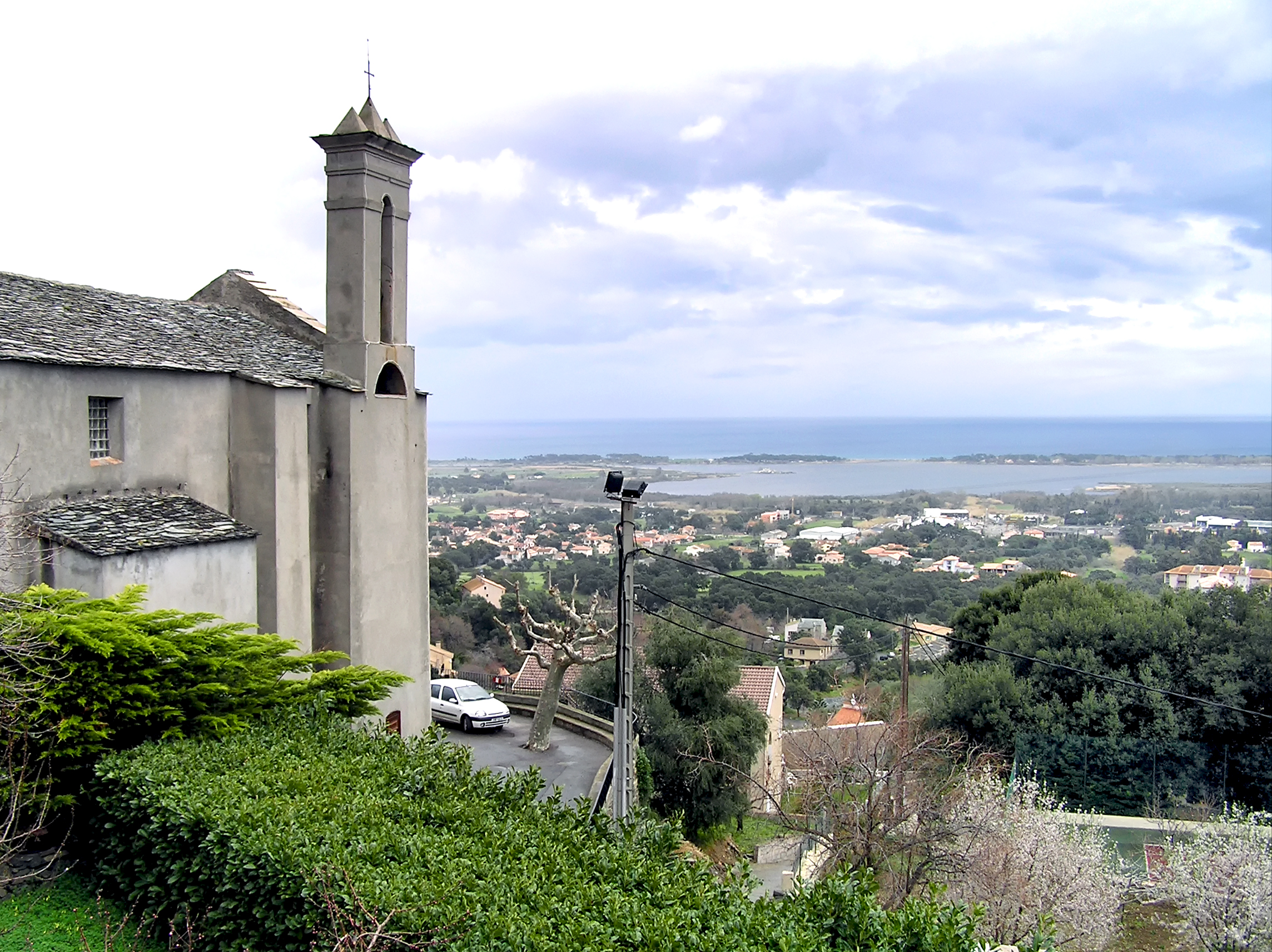
View of the lagoon from the Église Saint-André in Biguglia

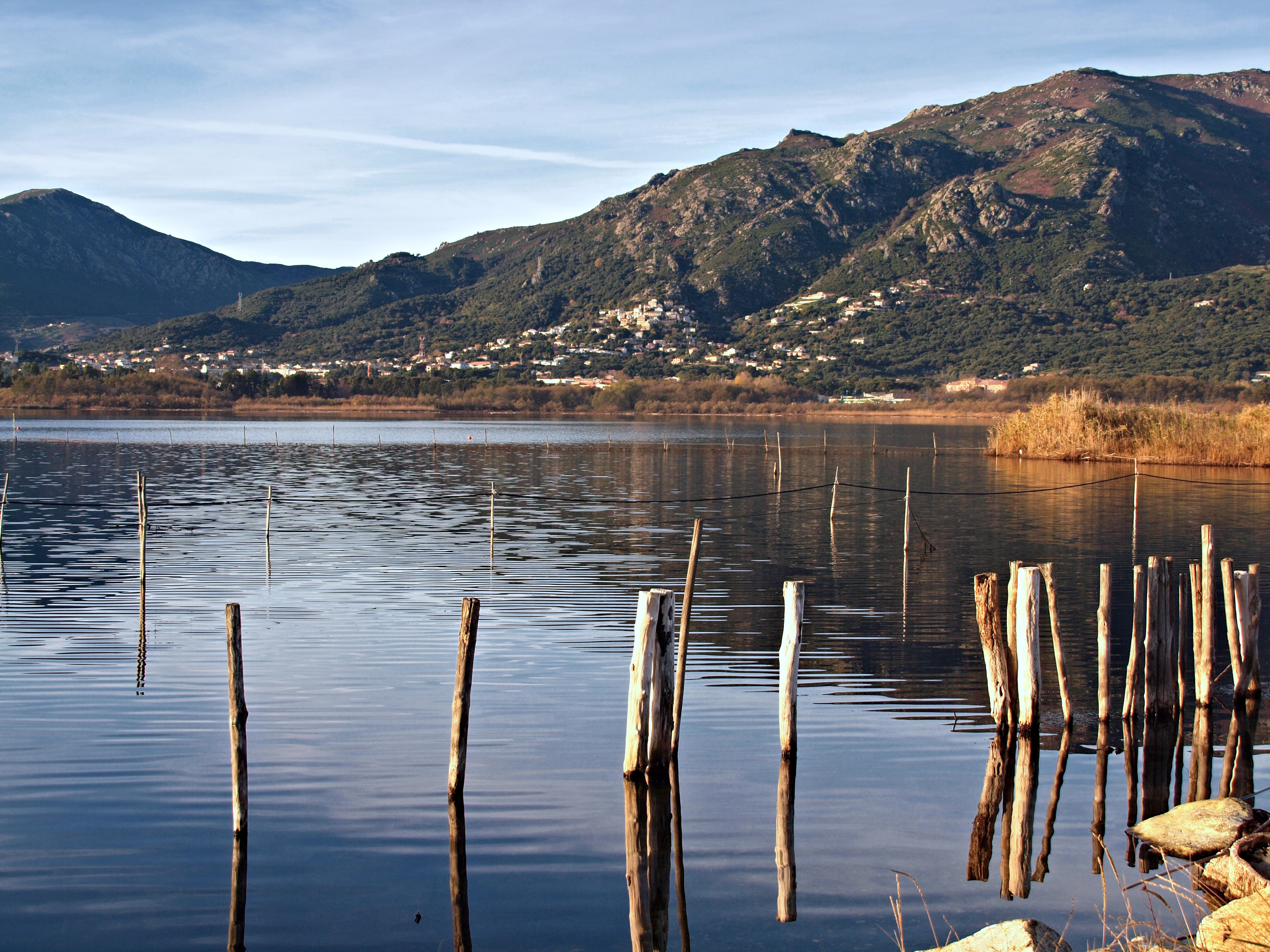
Looking west across the lagoon. The poles anchor capétchade traps.

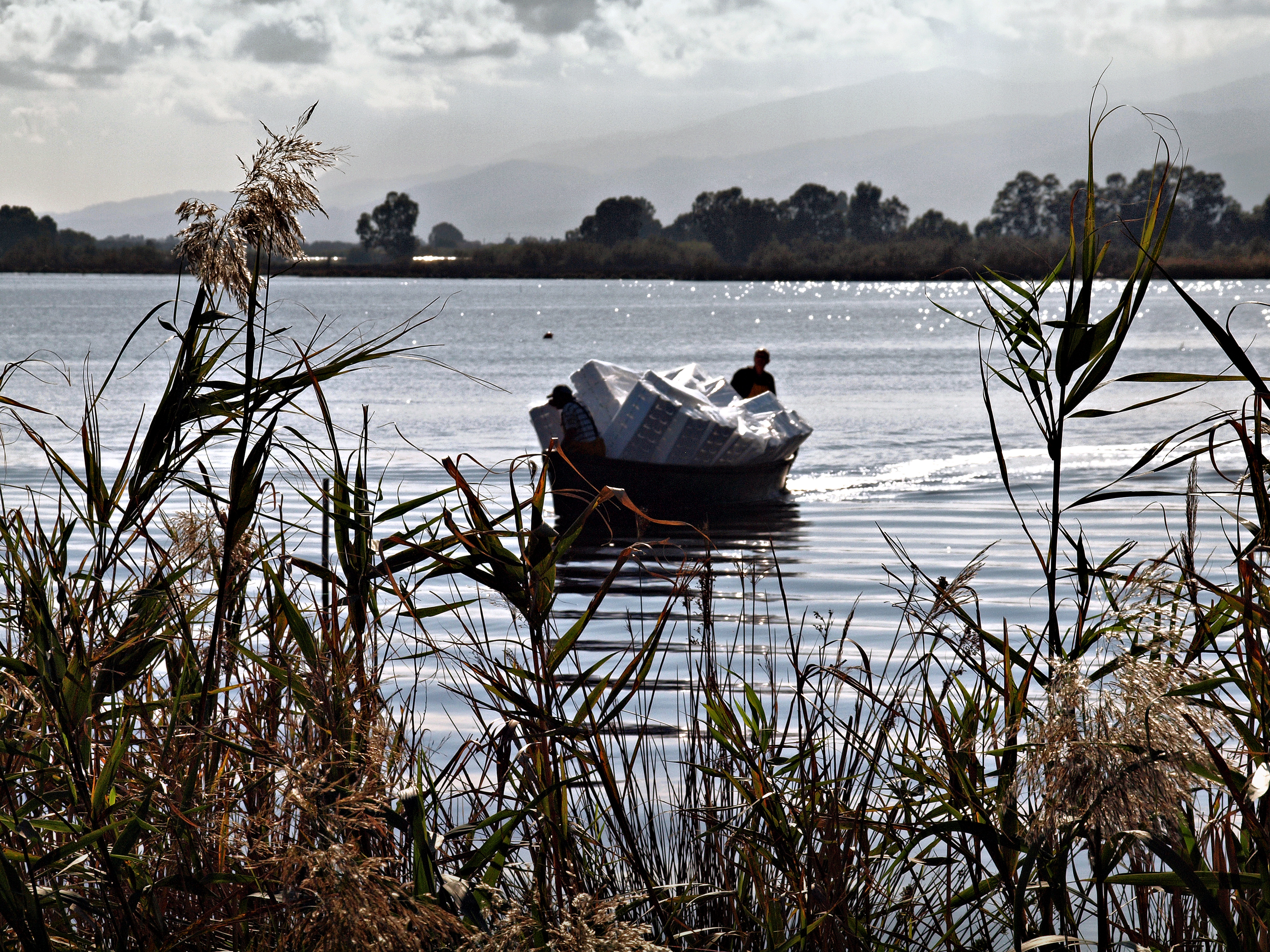
Furiani fishermen bringing crates to hold eels, commonly roasted and eaten in the region, to be sold in Sardinia

== Sources ==
- Biguglia Pond Natural Reserve, Bastia office de tourisma intercommunal
- Étang de Biguglia (in French), Pôle-relais lagunes méditerranéennes
- Étang de Biguglia, Ramsar Sites Information Service
- Étang de Biguglia (in French), Réserves naturelles de France
- L'Étang de Biguglia (The Biguglia Lagoon), Air Corsica
- "Relation: Étang de Biguglia (4735610)", OpejStreetMap
