= Sorio =

- Commune
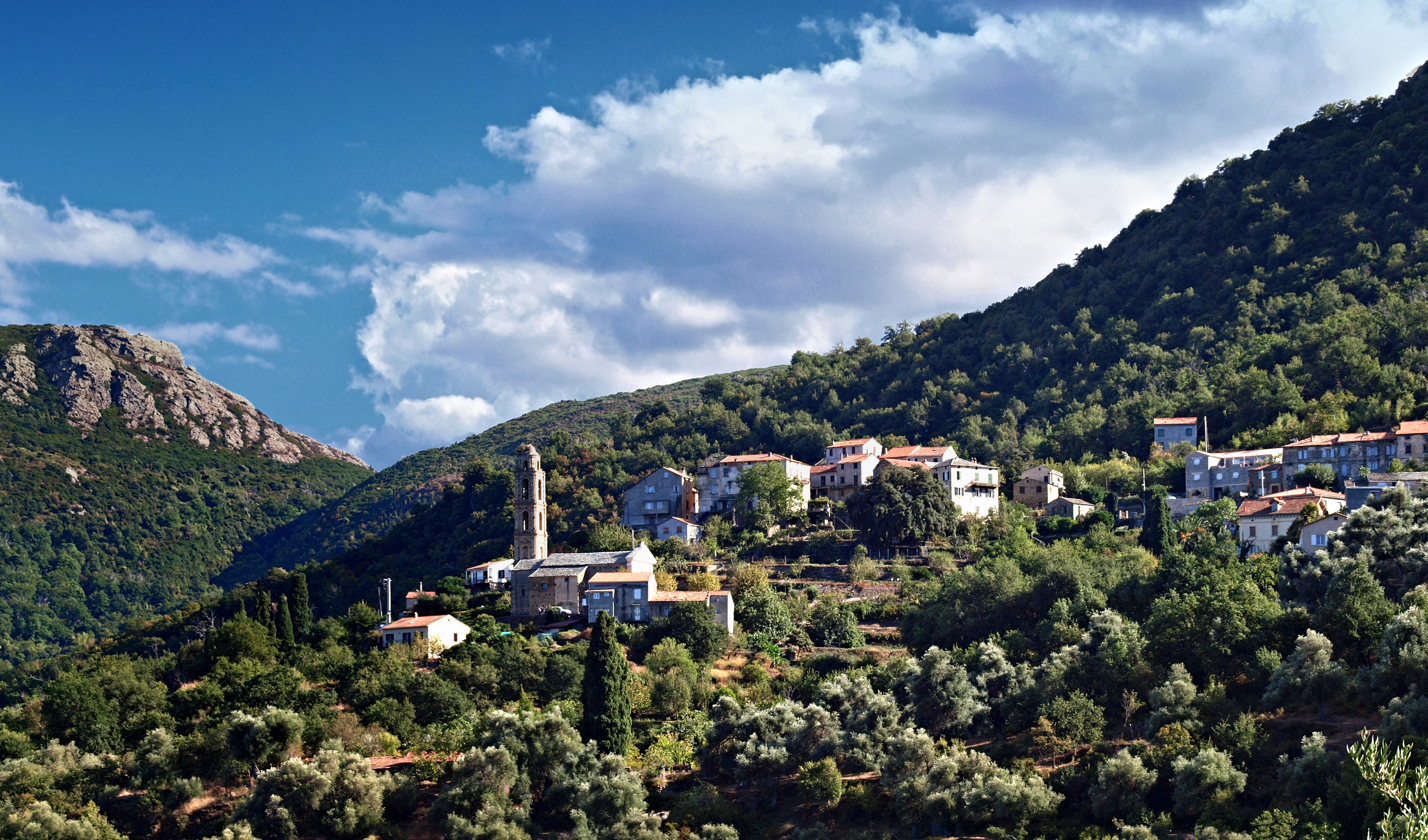
- The church and surrounding buildings in Sorio
- Location of Sorio
- Location within France Location within Corsica
- Coordinates: 42°35′02″N 9°16′28″E
- Country: France
- Region: Corsica
- Department: Haute-Corse
- Arrondissement: Calvi
- Canton: Biguglia-Nebbio

Government
  - Mayor (2020–2026): Joseph Chiarelli
- Area^{1}: 15.56 km^{2} (6.01 sq mi)
- Elevation: 400 m (1,300 ft)
- Highest elevation: 1,535 m (5,036 ft)
- Lowest elevation: 119 m (390 ft)
- Population (2023): 118
  - Density: 7.58/km^{2} (19.6/sq mi)
- Time zone: UTC+01:00 (CET)
  - Summer (DST): UTC+02:00 (CEST)
- INSEE/Postal code: 2B287 /20246
- ^{1} French Land Register data, which excludes lakes, ponds, glaciers > 1 km^{2} (0.386 sq mi or 247 acres) and river estuaries.

Sorio (French pronunciation: [sɔʁjo]; Corsican: Soriu) is a commune in the Haute-Corse department of France on the island of Corsica.

== Population ==
Historical population
Year	Pop.	±% p.a.
1968	165	—
1975	141	−2.22%
1982	118	−2.51%
1990	126	+0.82%
1999	148	+1.80%
2007	153	+0.42%
2012	140	−1.76%
2017	142	+0.28%
2023	118	−3.04%
Source: INSEE

== See also ==
- Communes of the Haute-Corse department
