= Vallecalle =

- Commune
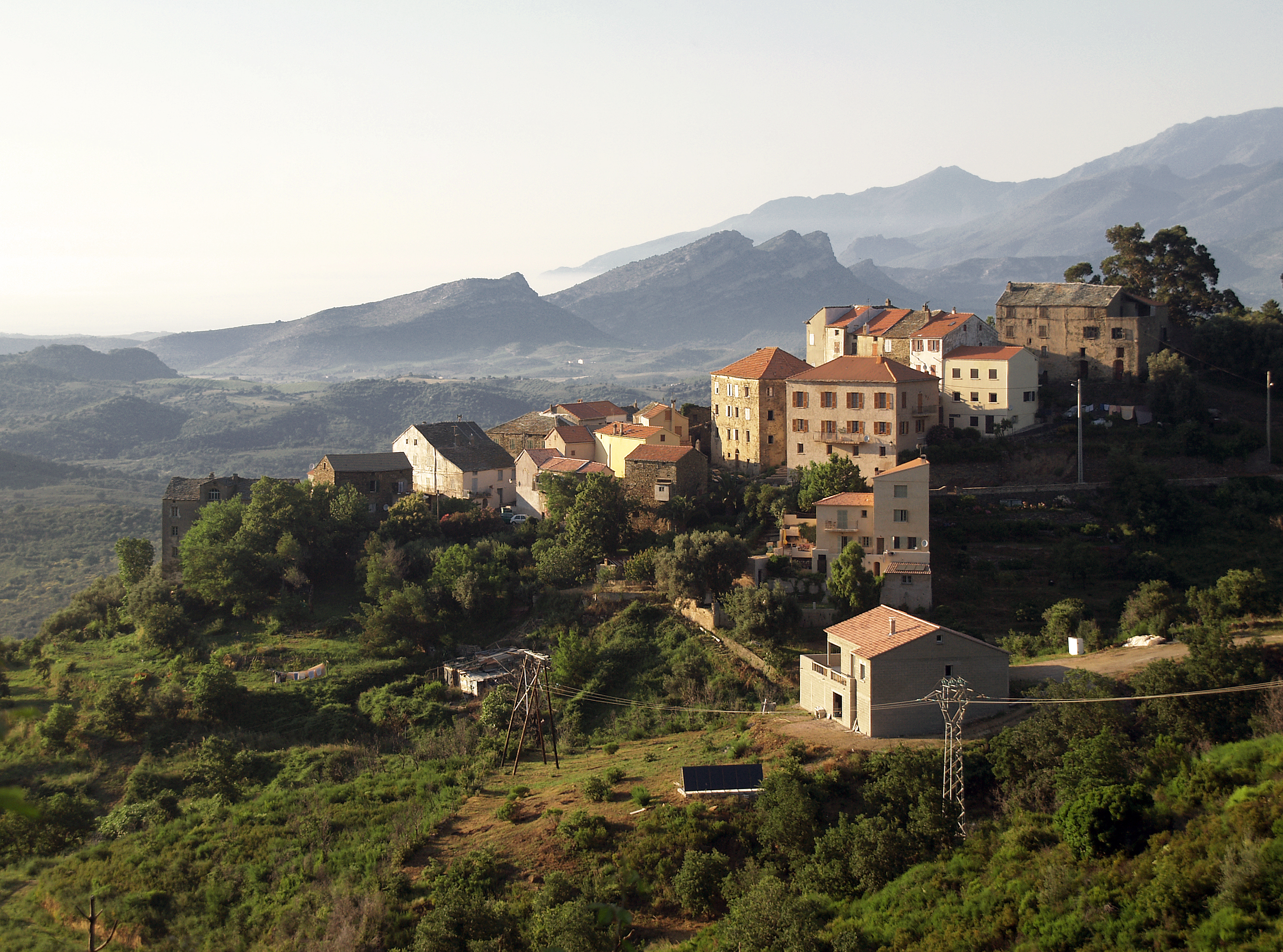
- The village of Vallecalle, in the area of Nebbio
- Location of Vallecalle
- Location within France Location within Corsica
- Coordinates: 42°35′58″N 9°20′21″E
- Country: France
- Region: Corsica
- Department: Haute-Corse
- Arrondissement: Calvi
- Canton: Biguglia-Nebbio

Government
  - Mayor (2022–2026): Augustin Poggi
- Area^{1}: 6.91 km^{2} (2.67 sq mi)
- Elevation: 150 m (490 ft)
- Highest elevation: 519 m (1,703 ft)
- Lowest elevation: 59 m (194 ft)
- Population (2023): 169
  - Density: 24.5/km^{2} (63.3/sq mi)
- Time zone: UTC+01:00 (CET)
  - Summer (DST): UTC+02:00 (CEST)
- INSEE/Postal code: 2B333 /20232
- ^{1} French Land Register data, which excludes lakes, ponds, glaciers > 1 km^{2} (0.386 sq mi or 247 acres) and river estuaries.

Vallecalle is a commune in the Haute-Corse department of France on the island of Corsica.

== Population ==
Historical population
Year	Pop.	±% p.a.
1968	149	—
1975	126	−2.37%
1982	100	−3.25%
1990	95	−0.64%
1999	109	+1.54%
2007	105	−0.47%
2012	118	+2.36%
2017	137	+3.03%
2023	169	+3.56%
Source: INSEE

== See also ==
- Communes of the Haute-Corse department
