= Piève =

- Commune
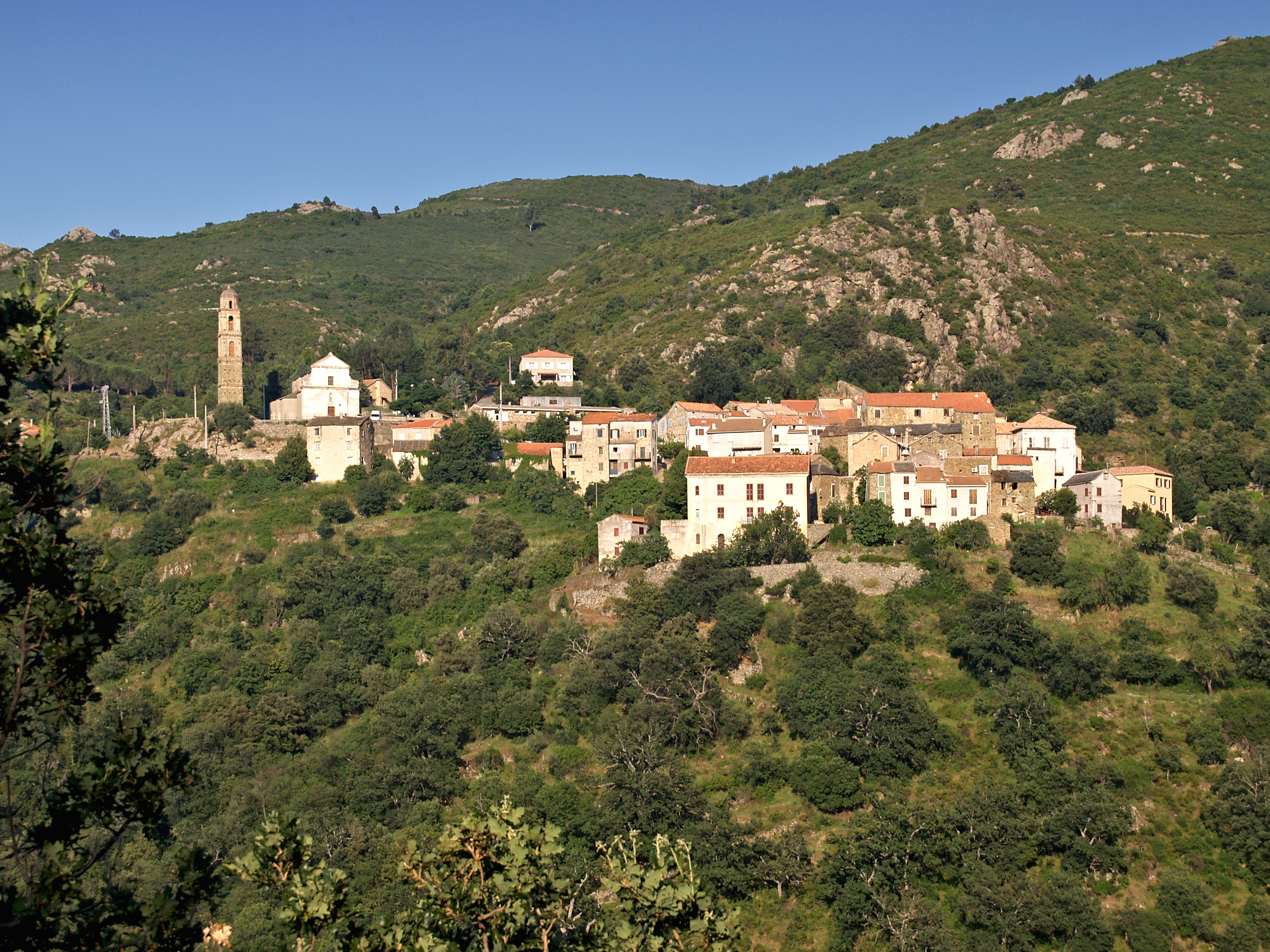
- A general view of Piève
- Location of Piève
- Location within France Location within Corsica
- Coordinates: 42°34′51″N 9°17′18″E
- Country: France
- Region: Corsica
- Department: Haute-Corse
- Arrondissement: Calvi
- Canton: Biguglia-Nebbio

Government
  - Mayor (2020–2026): Antoine Signanini-Pieve
- Area^{1}: 19.7 km^{2} (7.6 sq mi)
- Elevation: 450 m (1,480 ft)
- Highest elevation: 1,427 m (4,682 ft)
- Lowest elevation: 16 m (52 ft)
- Population (2023): 115
  - Density: 5.84/km^{2} (15.1/sq mi)
- Time zone: UTC+01:00 (CET)
  - Summer (DST): UTC+02:00 (CEST)
- INSEE/Postal code: 2B230 /20246
- ^{1} French Land Register data, which excludes lakes, ponds, glaciers > 1 km^{2} (0.386 sq mi or 247 acres) and river estuaries.

Piève (French pronunciation: [pjɛv]; Italian: Pieve; Corsican: A Pieve) is a commune in the Haute-Corse department of France on the island of Corsica.

== Population ==
Historical population
Year	Pop.	±% p.a.
1968	61	—
1975	61	+0.00%
1982	61	+0.00%
1990	75	+2.62%
1999	85	+1.40%
2007	121	+4.51%
2012	115	−1.01%
2017	109	−1.07%
2023	115	+0.90%
Source: INSEE

== See also ==
- Communes of the Haute-Corse department
