= San-Gavino-di-Tenda =

- Commune
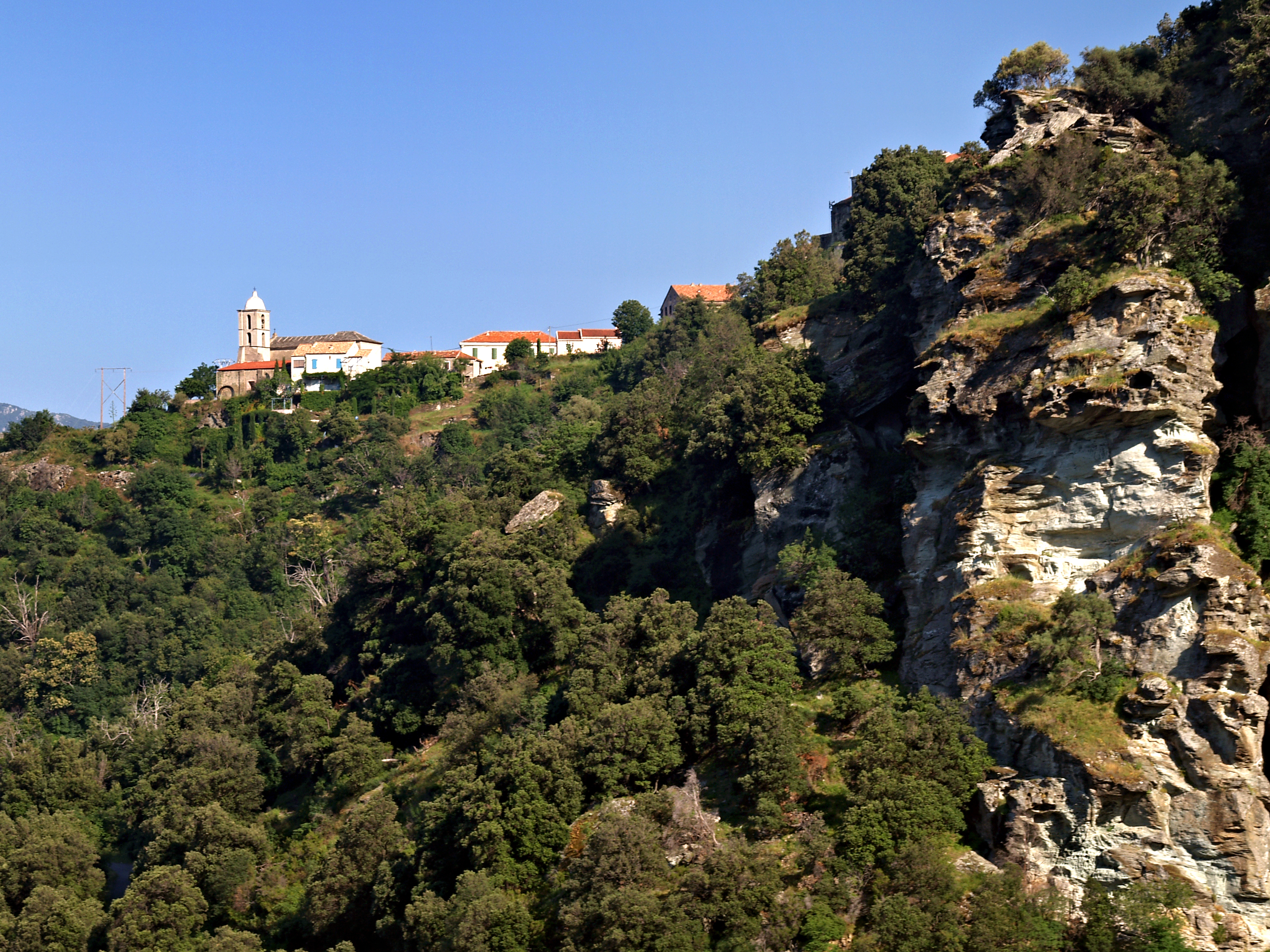
- A general view of San-Gavino-di-Tenda
- Location of San-Gavino-di-Tenda
- Location within France Location within Corsica
- Coordinates: 42°35′59″N 9°16′05″E
- Country: France
- Region: Corsica
- Department: Haute-Corse
- Arrondissement: Calvi
- Canton: Biguglia-Nebbio

Government
  - Mayor (2020–2026): Christian Tomi
- Area^{1}: 50.44 km^{2} (19.47 sq mi)
- Elevation: 340 m (1,120 ft)
- Highest elevation: 1,426 m (4,678 ft)
- Lowest elevation: 0 m (0 ft)
- Population (2023): 64
  - Density: 1.3/km^{2} (3.3/sq mi)
- Time zone: UTC+01:00 (CET)
  - Summer (DST): UTC+02:00 (CEST)
- INSEE/Postal code: 2B301 /20246
- ^{1} French Land Register data, which excludes lakes, ponds, glaciers > 1 km^{2} (0.386 sq mi or 247 acres) and river estuaries.

San-Gavino-di-Tenda (French pronunciation: [sɑ̃ ɡavino di tɑ̃da]) is a commune in the Haute-Corse department of France on the island of Corsica.

== Population ==
Historical population
Year	Pop.	±% p.a.
1968	97	—
1975	86	−1.70%
1982	70	−2.90%
1990	47	−4.86%
1999	56	+1.97%
2007	51	−1.16%
2012	58	+2.61%
2017	66	+2.62%
2023	64	−0.51%
Source: INSEE

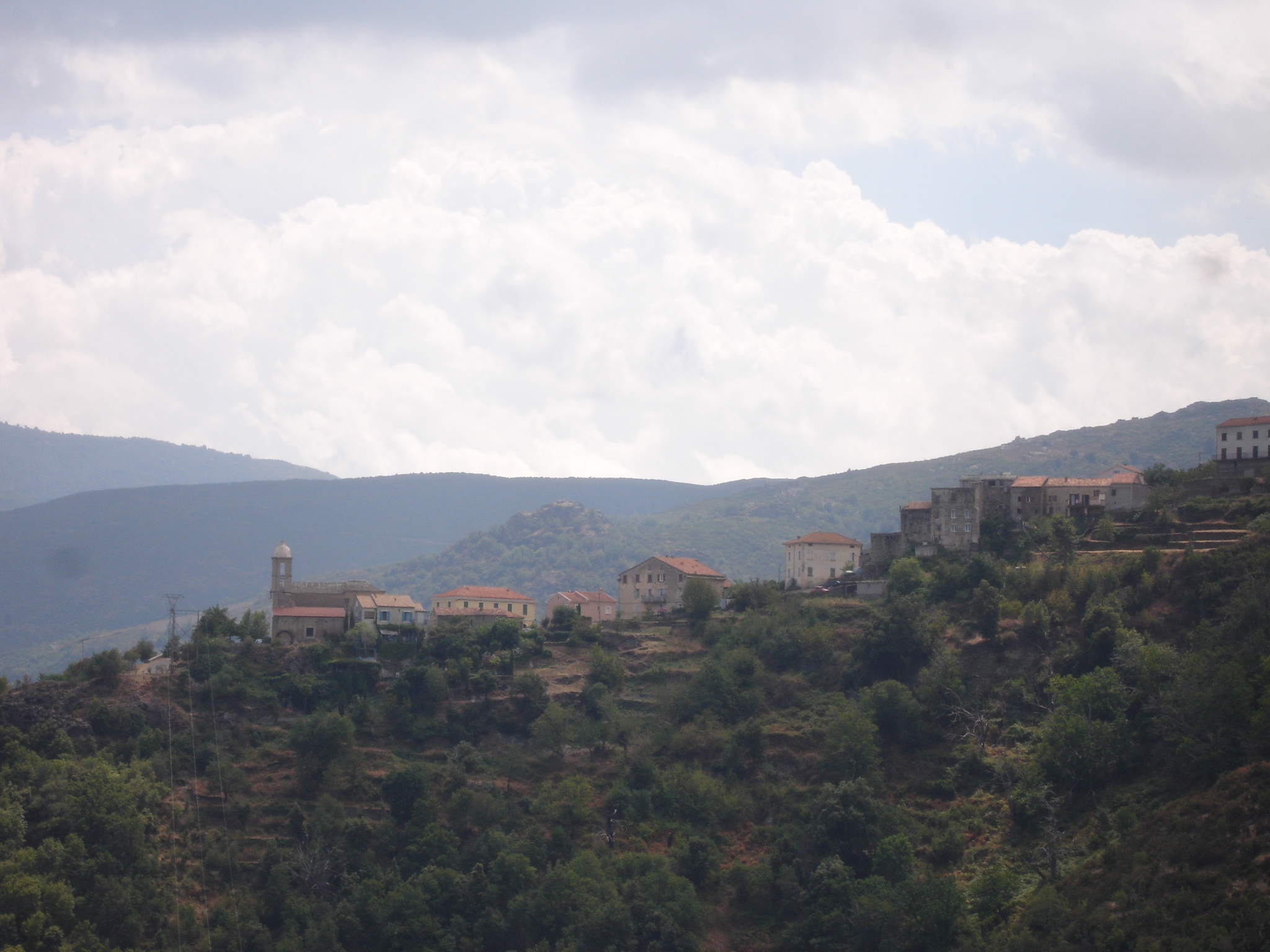
The village

== See also ==
- Communes of the Haute-Corse department
