= Biguglia =

- Commune
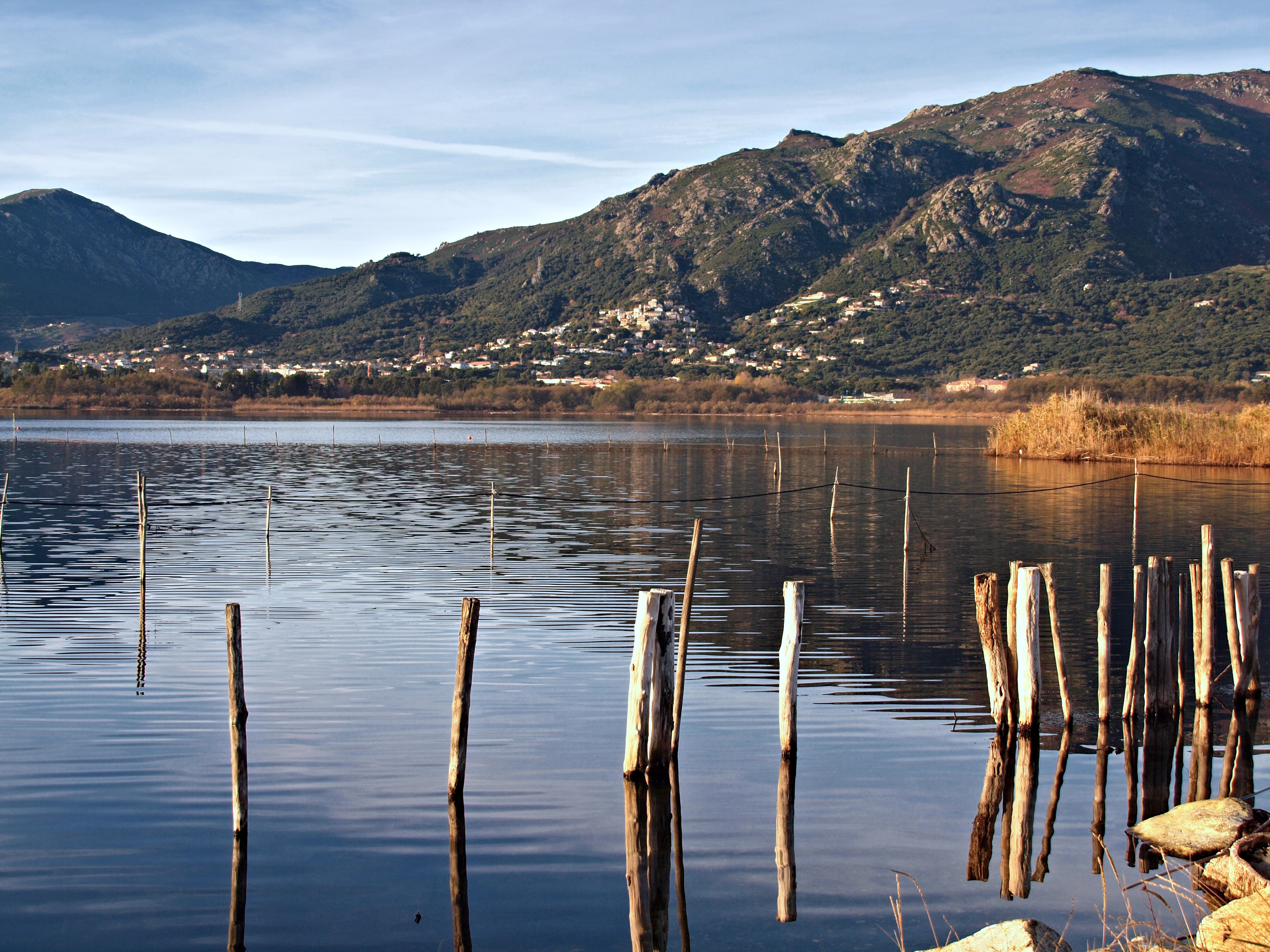
- The Biguglia Lake

- Coat of arms
- Location of Biguglia
- Location within France Location within Corsica
- Coordinates: 42°37′41″N 9°25′14″E
- Country: France
- Region: Corsica
- Department: Haute-Corse
- Arrondissement: Bastia
- Canton: Biguglia-Nebbio

Government
  - Mayor (2020–2026): Jean-Charles Giabiconi
- Area^{1}: 22.27 km^{2} (8.60 sq mi)
- Elevation: 270 m (890 ft)
- Highest elevation: 665 m (2,182 ft)
- Lowest elevation: 0 m (0 ft)
- Population (2023): 7,642
  - Density: 343.2/km^{2} (888.8/sq mi)
- Time zone: UTC+01:00 (CET)
  - Summer (DST): UTC+02:00 (CEST)
- INSEE/Postal code: 2B037 /20600
- ^{1} French Land Register data, which excludes lakes, ponds, glaciers > 1 km^{2} (0.386 sq mi or 247 acres) and river estuaries.

Biguglia (French pronunciation: [biɡu(l)ja]) is a commune in the Haute-Corse department of France on the island of Corsica. It is near the town of Bastia.

== Population ==
Historical population
Year	Pop.	±% p.a.
1968	905	—
1975	1,761	+9.98%
1982	2,812	+6.91%
1990	4,073	+4.74%
1999	5,018	+2.35%
2007	6,215	+2.71%
2012	7,547	+3.96%
2017	7,923	+0.98%
2023	7,642	−0.60%
Source: INSEE

== Sport ==
Biguglia is the home of Championnat de France Amateurs 2 club, ÉF Bastia.

== See also ==
- Communes of the Haute-Corse department
- Railway stations in Corsica
