= Olmeta-di-Tuda =

- Commune
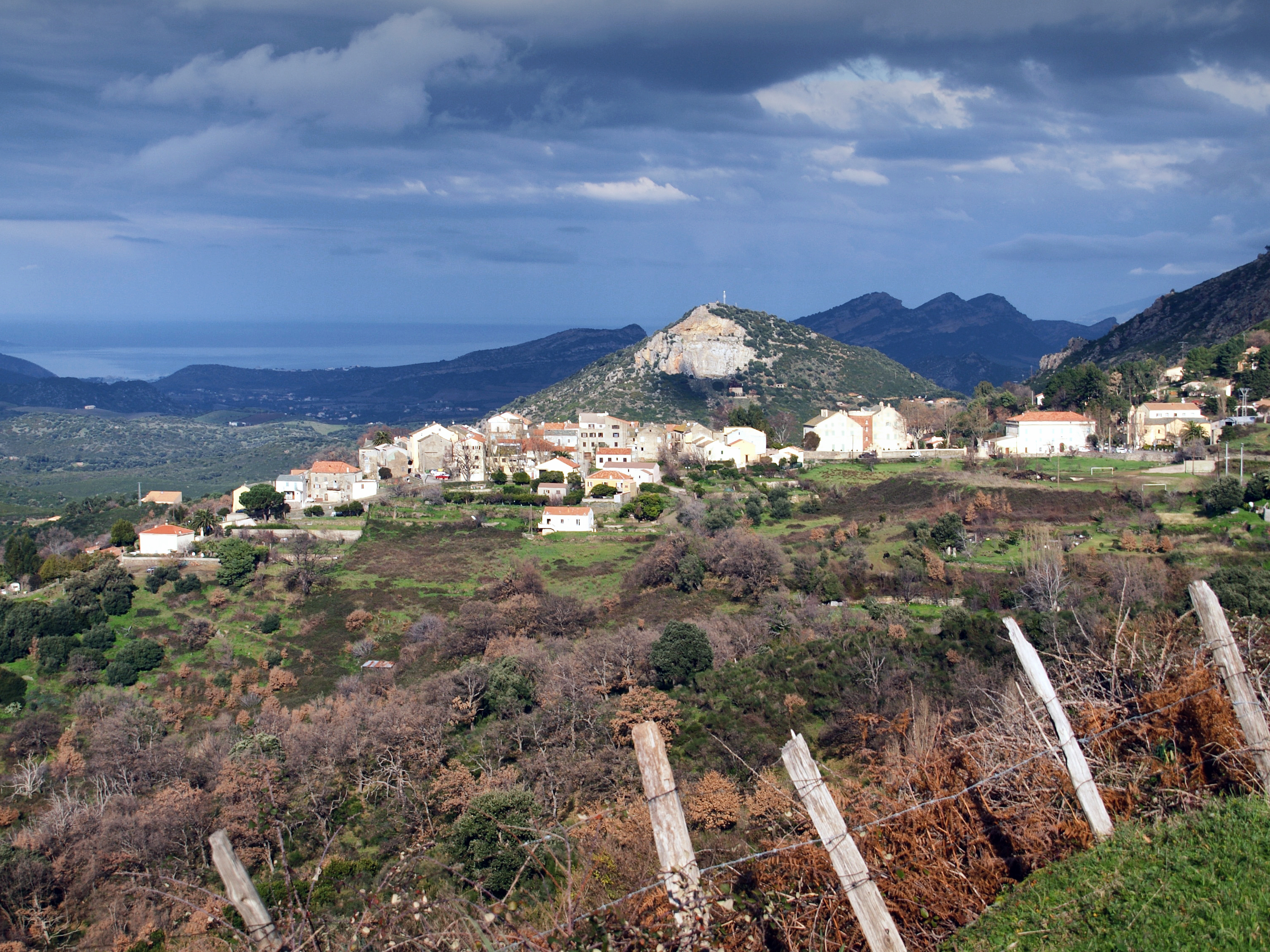
- A general view of Olmeta-di-Tuda village
- Location of Olmeta-di-Tuda
- Location within France Location within Corsica
- Coordinates: 42°36′44″N 9°21′16″E
- Country: France
- Region: Corsica
- Department: Haute-Corse
- Arrondissement: Calvi
- Canton: Biguglia-Nebbio

Government
  - Mayor (2020–2026): Pierre Agostini
- Area^{1}: 17.4 km^{2} (6.7 sq mi)
- Elevation: 300 m (980 ft)
- Highest elevation: 804 m (2,638 ft)
- Lowest elevation: 26 m (85 ft)
- Population (2023): 583
  - Density: 33.5/km^{2} (86.8/sq mi)
- Time zone: UTC+01:00 (CET)
  - Summer (DST): UTC+02:00 (CEST)
- INSEE/Postal code: 2B188 /20232
- ^{1} French Land Register data, which excludes lakes, ponds, glaciers > 1 km^{2} (0.386 sq mi or 247 acres) and river estuaries.

Olmeta-di-Tuda is a commune in the Haute-Corse department of France on the island of Corsica.

== Population ==
Historical population
Year	Pop.	±% p.a.
1968	204	—
1975	150	−4.30%
1982	221	+5.69%
1990	247	+1.40%
1999	291	+1.84%
2007	328	+1.51%
2012	398	+3.94%
2017	488	+4.16%
2023	583	+3.01%
Source: INSEE

== See also ==
- Communes of the Haute-Corse department
