= Rutali =

- Commune
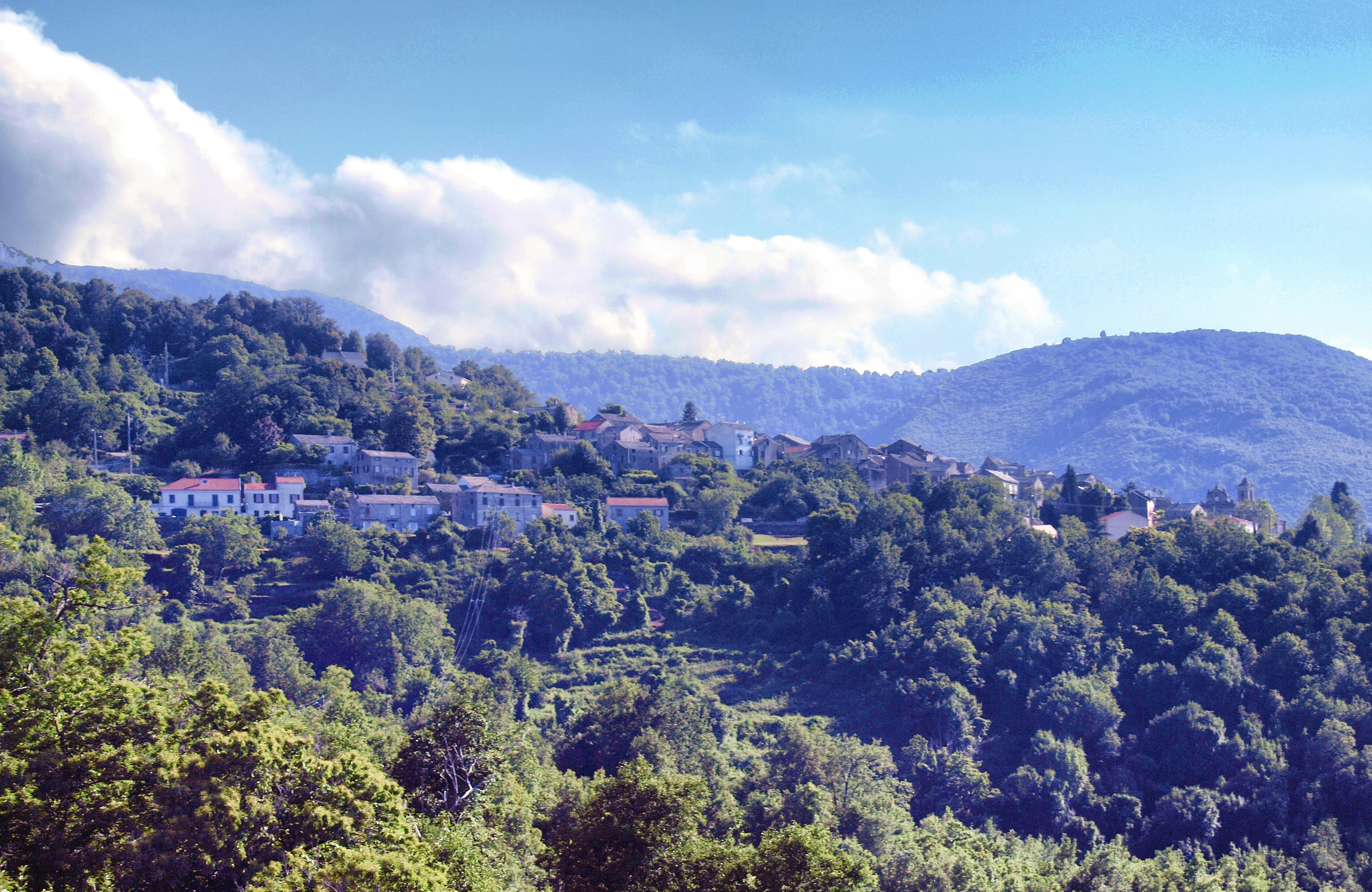
- A general view of Rutali
- Location of Rutali
- Location within France Location within Corsica
- Coordinates: 42°34′51″N 9°21′50″E
- Country: France
- Region: Corsica
- Department: Haute-Corse
- Arrondissement: Calvi
- Canton: Biguglia-Nebbio

Government
  - Mayor (2020–2026): Dominique Maroselli
- Area^{1}: 17.11 km^{2} (6.61 sq mi)
- Elevation: 525 m (1,722 ft)
- Highest elevation: 1,151 m (3,776 ft)
- Lowest elevation: 35 m (115 ft)
- Population (2023): 531
  - Density: 31.0/km^{2} (80.4/sq mi)
- Time zone: UTC+01:00 (CET)
  - Summer (DST): UTC+02:00 (CEST)
- INSEE/Postal code: 2B265 /20239
- ^{1} French Land Register data, which excludes lakes, ponds, glaciers > 1 km^{2} (0.386 sq mi or 247 acres) and river estuaries.

Rutali is a commune in the Haute-Corse department of France on the island of Corsica.

== Population ==
Historical population
Year	Pop.	±% p.a.
1968	198	—
1975	194	−0.29%
1982	181	−0.99%
1990	222	+2.59%
1999	247	+1.19%
2007	316	+3.13%
2012	372	+3.32%
2017	377	+0.27%
2023	531	+5.87%
Source: INSEE

== See also ==
- Communes of the Haute-Corse department
