= Murato, Haute-Corse =

Murato
- Commune
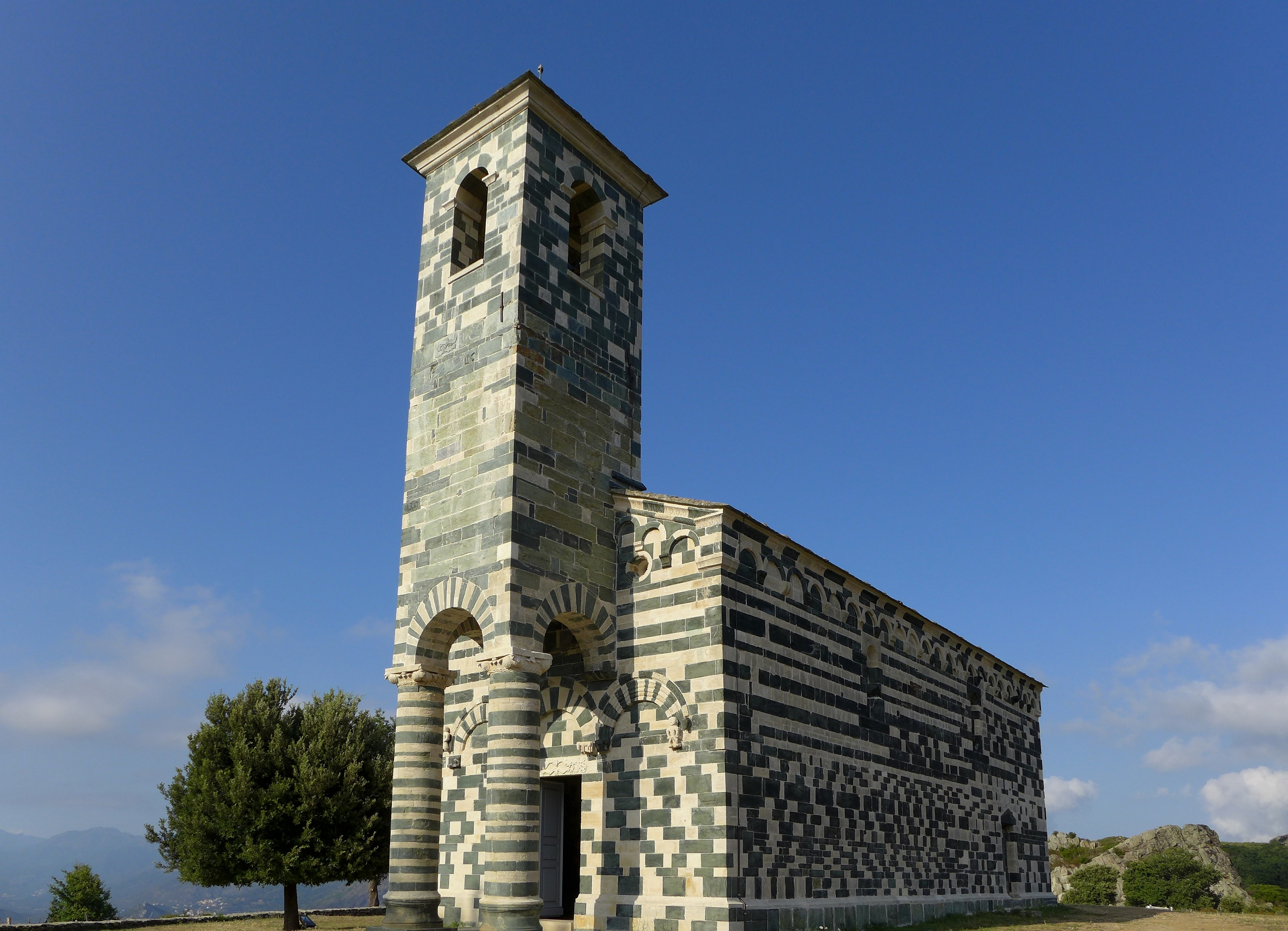
- San Michele church

- Coat of arms
- Location of Murato
- Location within France Location within Corsica
- Coordinates: 42°34′41″N 9°19′36″E
- Country: France
- Region: Corsica
- Department: Haute-Corse
- Arrondissement: Calvi
- Canton: Biguglia-Nebbio

Government
  - Mayor (2020–2026): Claude Flori
- Area^{1}: 20.38 km^{2} (7.87 sq mi)
- Elevation: 497 m (1,631 ft)
- Highest elevation: 1,112 m (3,648 ft)
- Lowest elevation: 239 m (784 ft)
- Population (2023): 560
  - Density: 27/km^{2} (71/sq mi)
- Time zone: UTC+01:00 (CET)
  - Summer (DST): UTC+02:00 (CEST)
- INSEE/Postal code: 2B172 /20239
- ^{1} French Land Register data, which excludes lakes, ponds, glaciers > 1 km^{2} (0.386 sq mi or 247 acres) and river estuaries.

Murato (French pronunciation: [muʁato], Italian pronunciation: [muˈraːto]; Corsican: Muratu, pronounced [muˈradu]) is a commune in the Upper Corsica department of France on the island of Corsica.

== Population ==
Historical population
Year	Pop.	±% p.a.
1968	538	—
1975	538	+0.00%
1982	533	−0.13%
1990	565	+0.73%
1999	555	−0.20%
2007	592	+0.81%
2012	626	+1.12%
2017	600	−0.84%
2023	560	−1.14%
Source: INSEE

== Monuments ==
- San Michele de Murato

== See also ==
- Communes of the Haute-Corse department
