= Olmeta =

Stream in the department of Haute-Corse, Corsica

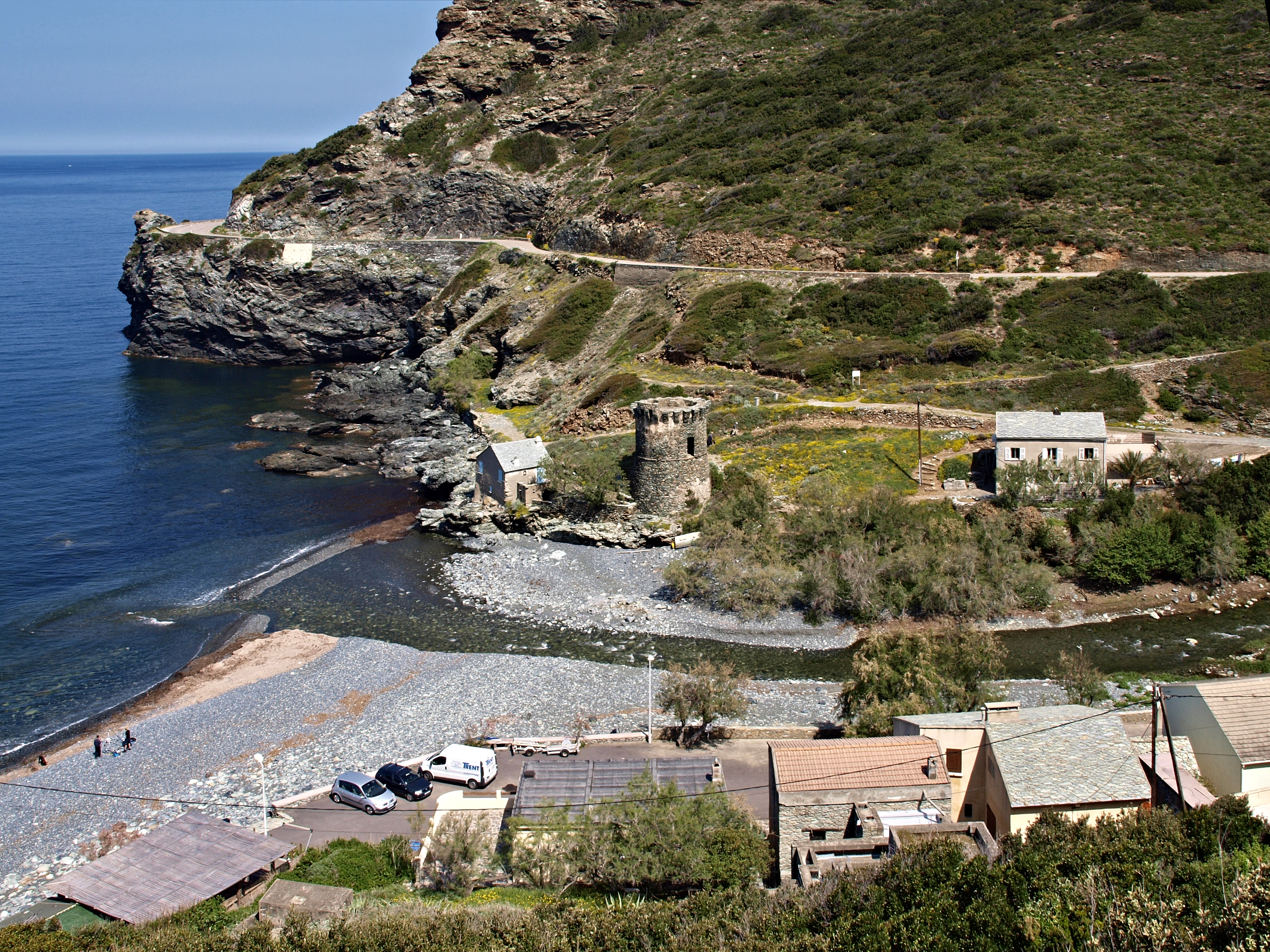
- Mouth of the river and Genoese tower

- Location within Corsica Location within France

Location
- Country: France
- Region: Corsica
- Department: Haute-Corse

Physical characteristics
- Mouth: Mediterranean Sea
  - coordinates: 42.7606°N 9.3399°E

The Olmeta (French: Rivière d'Olmeta, Corsican: Fiume d'Olmeta, Fiume di Negru) is a small coastal stream in the department of Haute-Corse, Corsica, France. It enters the Mediterranean Sea from the west of the Cap Corse peninsula.

== Course ==
The Olmeta is 7.3 kilometres (4.5 mi) long and flows through the commune of Olmeta-di-Capocorso. It rises in the center of the peninsula between the 1,183 metres (3,881 ft) Monte Prunu to the southwest and the 1,307 metres (4,288 ft) Monte Stello to the northeast. It flows west past the village of Olmeta-di-Capocorso to enter the sea in the village of Negru. Its mouth is between the mouths of the Fium'Albino to the south and the Guadu Grande to the north.

== Ancient bridge ==
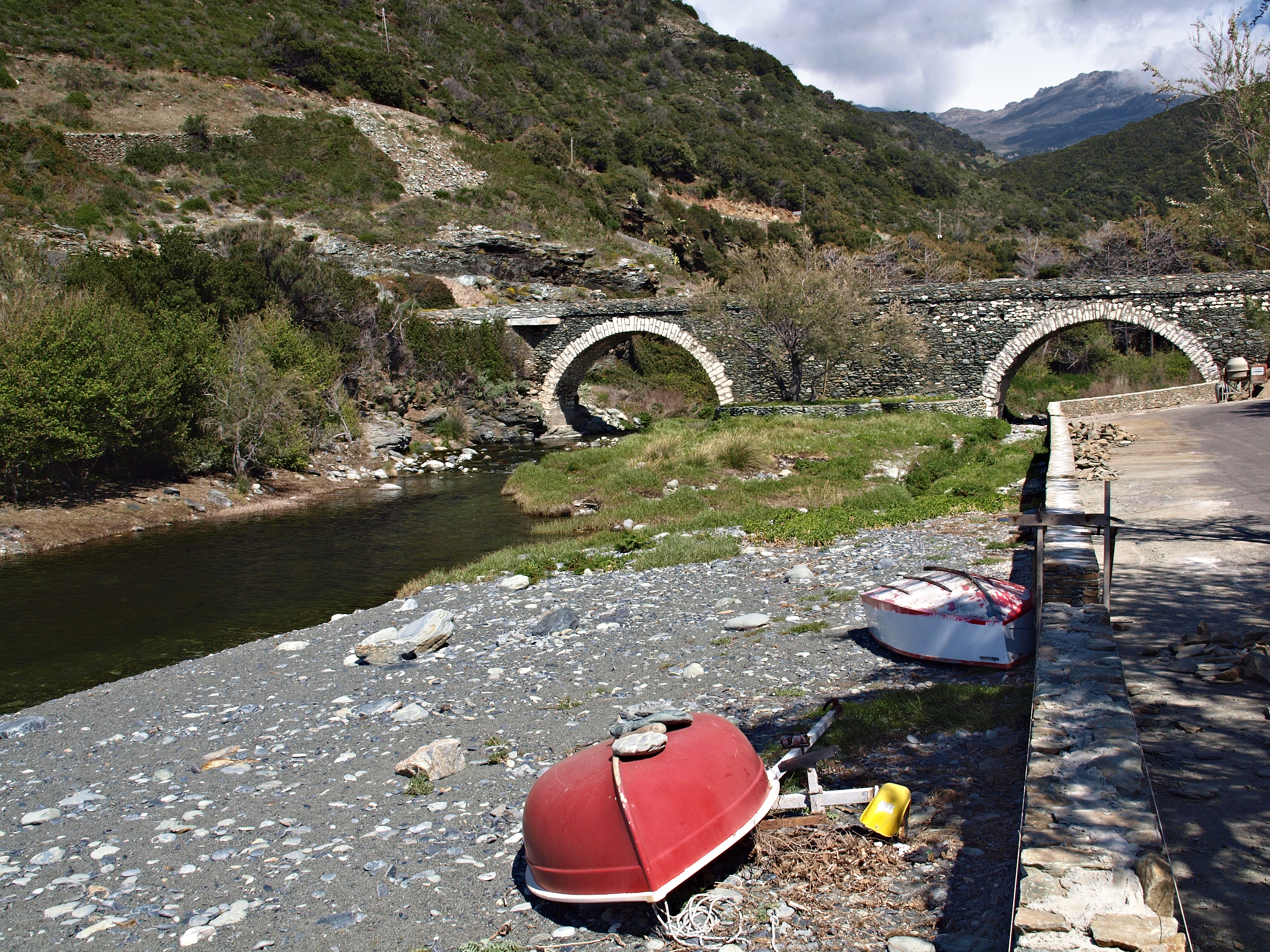
Double-arched Genoese bridge

The Genoese built the Negru Bridge across the Olmeta river to carry the old road to Saint-Florent. It was in the center of the Marine de Negru, which gives the village of Olmeta di Capocorso access to the sea. It was among the highest and longest in Corsica. In 1785 it was damaged by a flood and was repaired by the government of Louis XVI.

The bridge was washed away by the flood of 24 November 2016, leaving only the two piles on each bank of the river. The Fondation du patrimoine launched a project to rebuild the bridge at a cost of €445,000, with the work scheduled to start in the fall of 2021. The rebuilt bridge would appear identical to the original, but two "scars" would make it possible to distinguish the surviving piles from the rebuilt part.

== Genoese tower ==
The Tour de Negro or Torra di Negru, a Genoese tower, guards the river's mouth at the north end of the beach. The tower was one of a series of coastal defenses built by the Republic of Genoa between 1530 and 1620 to stem the attacks by Barbary pirates. The tower was built around 1559–1560.

== Tributaries ==
The following streams (ruisseaux) are tributaries of the Olmeta (ordered by length):

- Pierragia: 3 km (1.9 mi)
  - Pastinella: 1 km (0.62 mi)
- Lori: 2 km (1.2 mi)
  - Tenzione: 2 km (1.2 mi)
- Monte Grosso: 2 km (1.2 mi)
- Canarinca: 2 km (1.2 mi)

== Sources ==
- Graziani, Antoine-Marie (2000), "Les ouvrages de défense en Corse contre les Turcs (1530-1650)", in Vergé-Franceschi, Michel; Graziani, Antoine-Marie (eds.), La guerre de course en Méditerranée (1515-1830) (in French), Paris: Presses de l'Université Paris IV-Sorbonne, pp. 73–144, ISBN 2-84050-167-8
- Reconstruction du pont de Negro (in French), Fondation du patrimoine
- "Relation: Rivière d'Olmeta (9422539)", OpenStreetMap
- "Rivière d'Olmeta", Sandre (in French)
- "Tour de Negro", Base Mérimée (in French)
