= Torra d'Albu =

Genoese coastal defence tower in Corsica

Tower of Albu
- Torra d'Albu (Corsican)
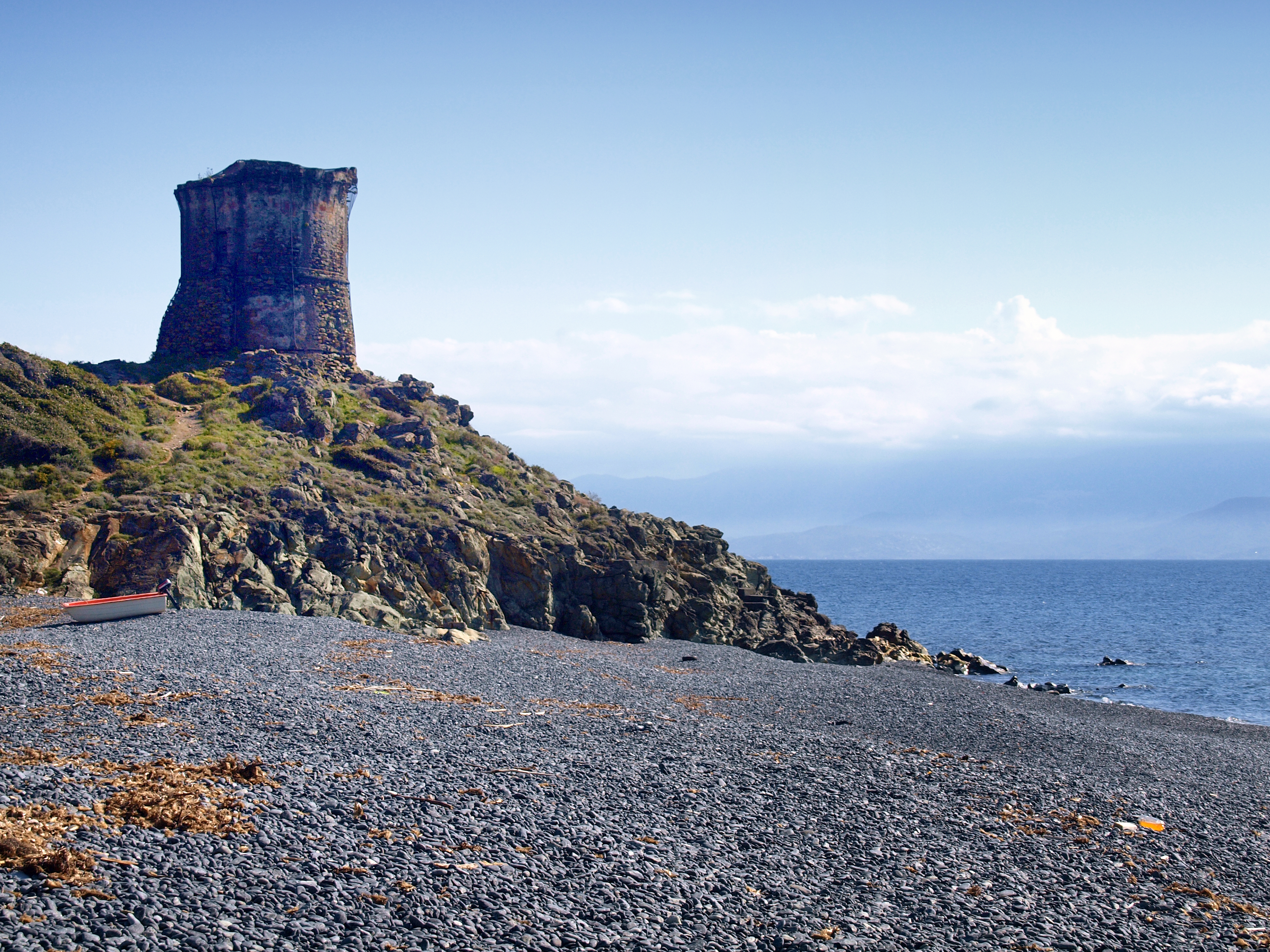

- Location within Corsica
- 42°48′29″N 9°20′02″E

History
- Built: Second half 16th century

Monument historique
- Designated: 4 August 1992
- Reference no.: PA00099284

The Tower of Albu (Note: The tower has several other names: Torra d'Ogliastro, Torra d'Olchini and Torra del Greco) (Corsican: Torra d'Albu) is a ruined Genoese tower located in the commune of Ogliastro (Haute-Corse) on the west coast of the Cap Corse on Corsica.

== History ==
The tower was one of a series of coastal defences constructed by the Republic of Genoa between 1530 and 1620 to stem the attacks by Barbary pirates. The tower was damaged in 1588 when Hassan Veneziano attacked the nearby village of Ogliastro and carried off several dozen villagers. A list of the towers defending the Corsican coastline compiled by the Genoese authorities in 1617 records that tower was guarded by men from the villages of Ogliastro and Olcani, but only during the night.

In 1992 the tower was listed as one of the official historical monuments of France.

== See also ==
- List of Genoese towers in Corsica
