= Torra di l'Osse =

Genoese coastal defence tower in Corsica

Tower of l'Osse
- Torra di Losso (Corsican)
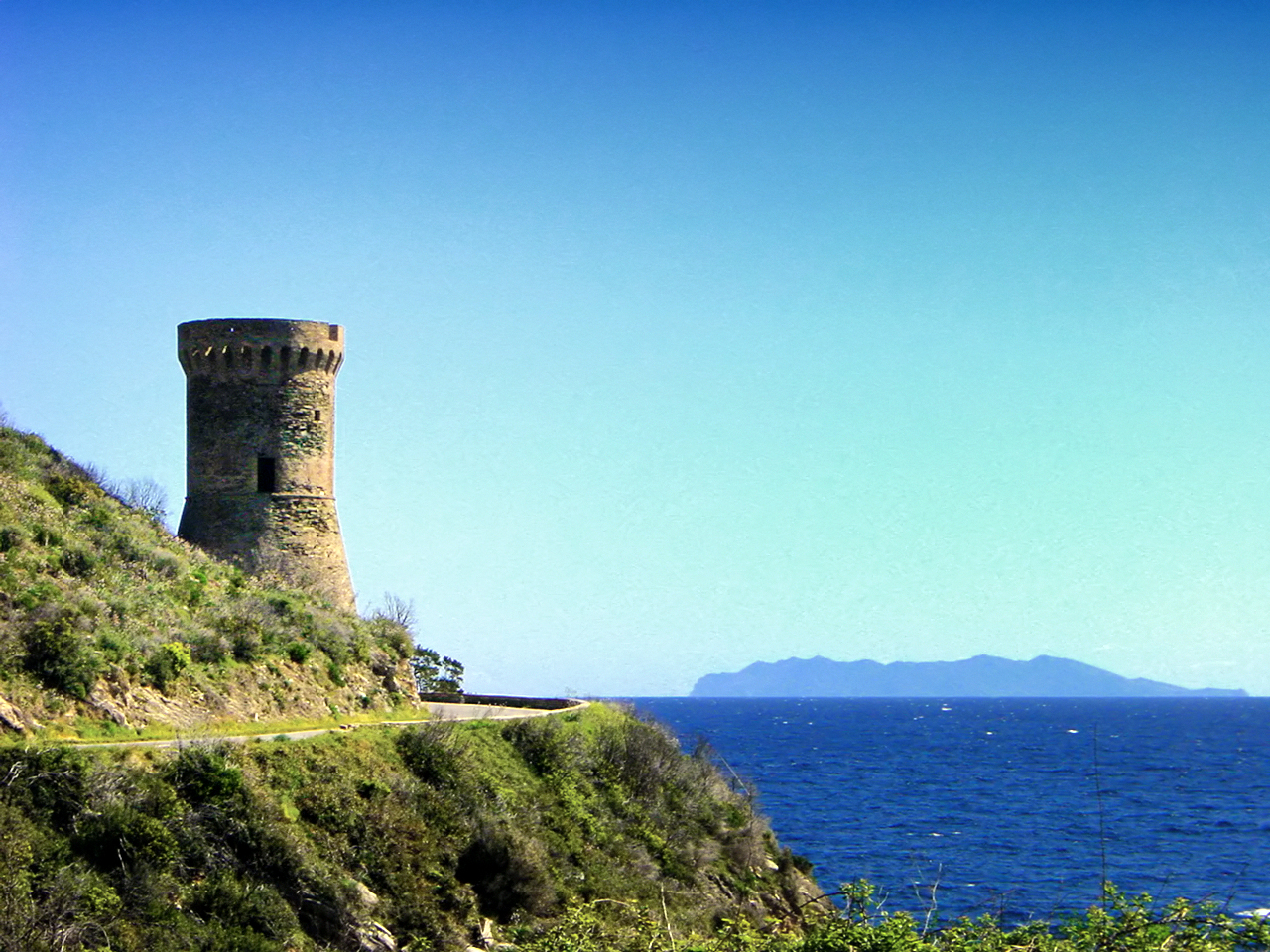
- Tower with the Italian island of Capraia in the distance

- Location within Corsica
- 42°51′40″N 9°28′51″E

History
- Built: 1599

Monument historique
- Designated: 17 December 1926
- Reference no.: PA00099168

The Tower of l'Osse or Tower of Losso (Corsican: Torra di Losso) is a Genoese tower located in the commune of Cagnano (Haute-Corse) on the Corsica. The tower lies on the east coast of Cap Corse.

The construction of the tower was begun in March 1599. It was one of a series of coastal defences constructed by the Republic of Genoa between 1530 and 1620 to stem the attacks by Barbary pirates. In 1926 the tower was listed as one of the official historical monuments of France. The date of construction given in the database (1520) is incorrect.

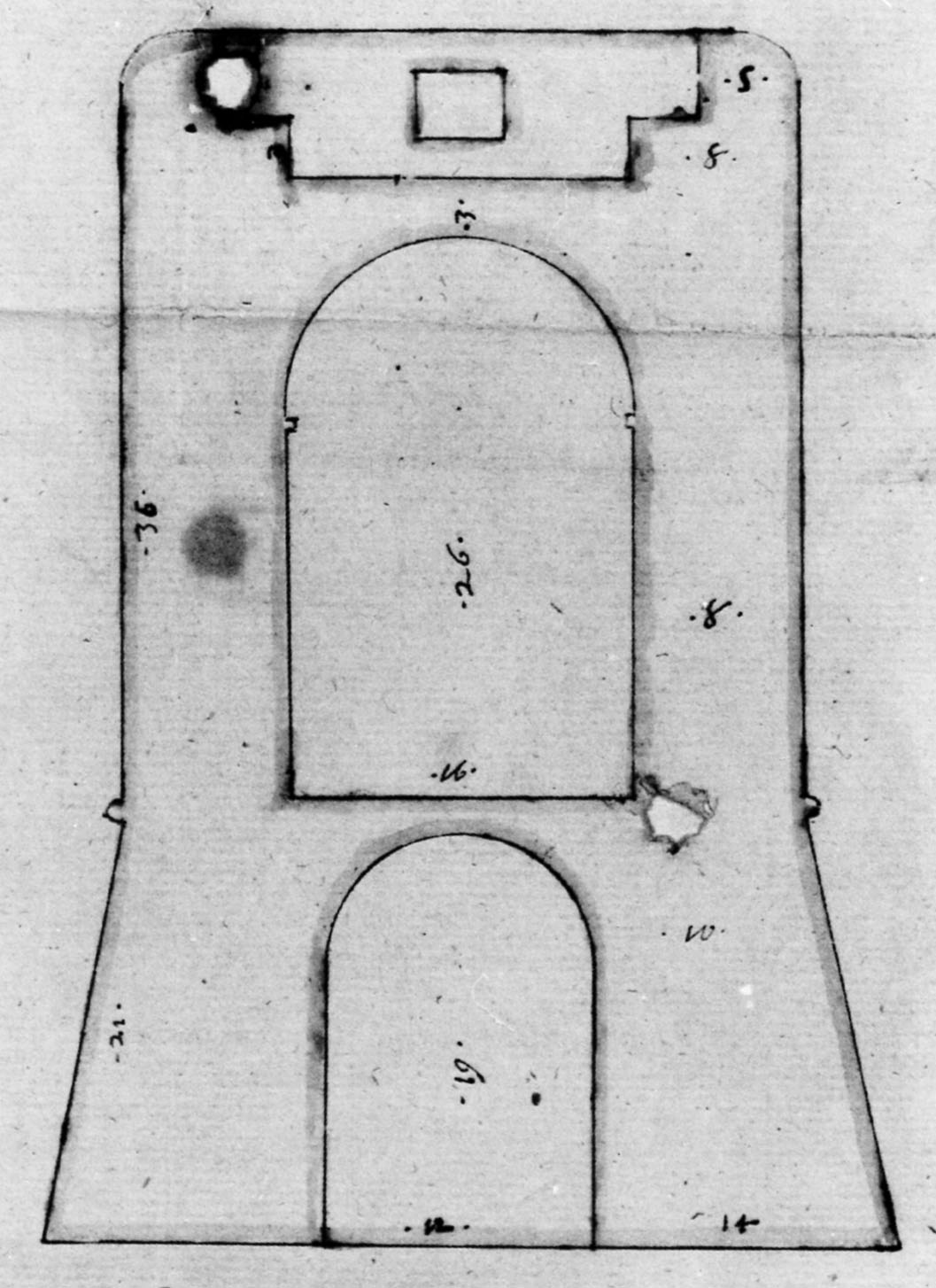
Vertical section through the proposed tower, 1598. The dimensions are in palmi (approx. 25 cm)

== See also ==
- List of Genoese towers in Corsica
