= Sisco (stream) =

Stream in the department of Haute-Corse, Corsica

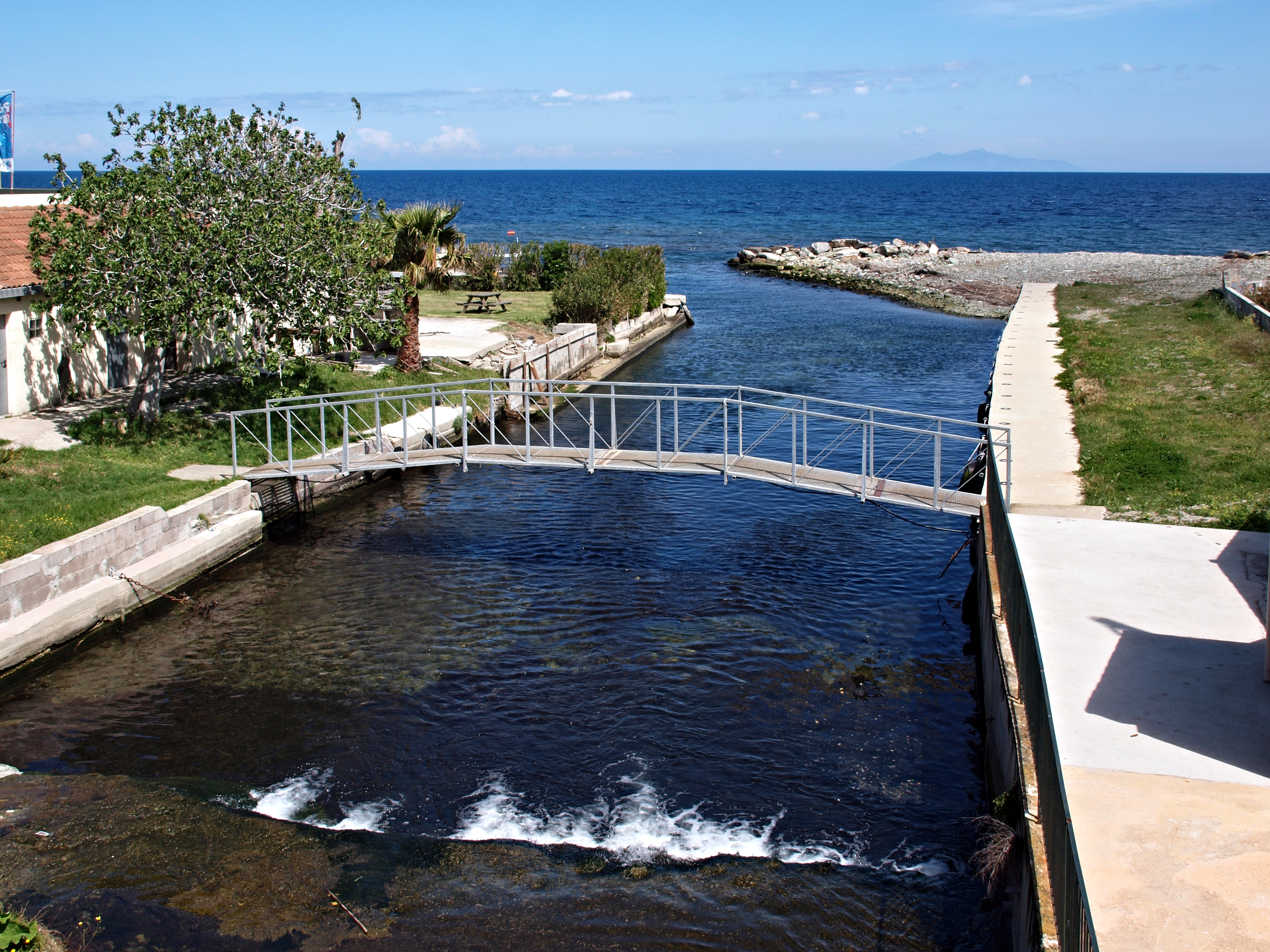
- Mouth of the Sisco

- Location within Corsica Location within France
- Native name: U Fiume di Siscu (Corsican)

Location
- Country: France
- Region: Corsica
- Department: Haute-Corse

Physical characteristics
- Mouth: Tyrrhenian Sea
  - coordinates: 42.8101°N 9.49°E

The Sisco (French: Ruisseau de Sisco) is a small coastal stream in the department of Haute-Corse, Corsica, France. It enters the Tyrrhenian Sea from the east of the Cap Corse peninsula.

== Course ==
The Sisco is 6.51 kilometres (4.05 mi) long and flows through the commune of Sisco, Haute-Corse. It rises at an altitude of 660 metres (2,170 ft) on the side of the Guado a l'Alzi. Its source is to the east of the 1,236 metres (4,055 ft) Rocher de Pruberzulu and south of Pietracorbara. The stream flows east-southeast to the sea, where its mouth is in the town of Sisco. It enters the sea at the Sisco marina, to the north of the pebble beach. Woods along the Sisco are mainly composed of holm oak, cork oak, chestnut, olive, beech and alder. The D32 road parallels the stream for most of its course.

The stream is called U Fiume di Siscu in the Corsican language.

== Watershed ==
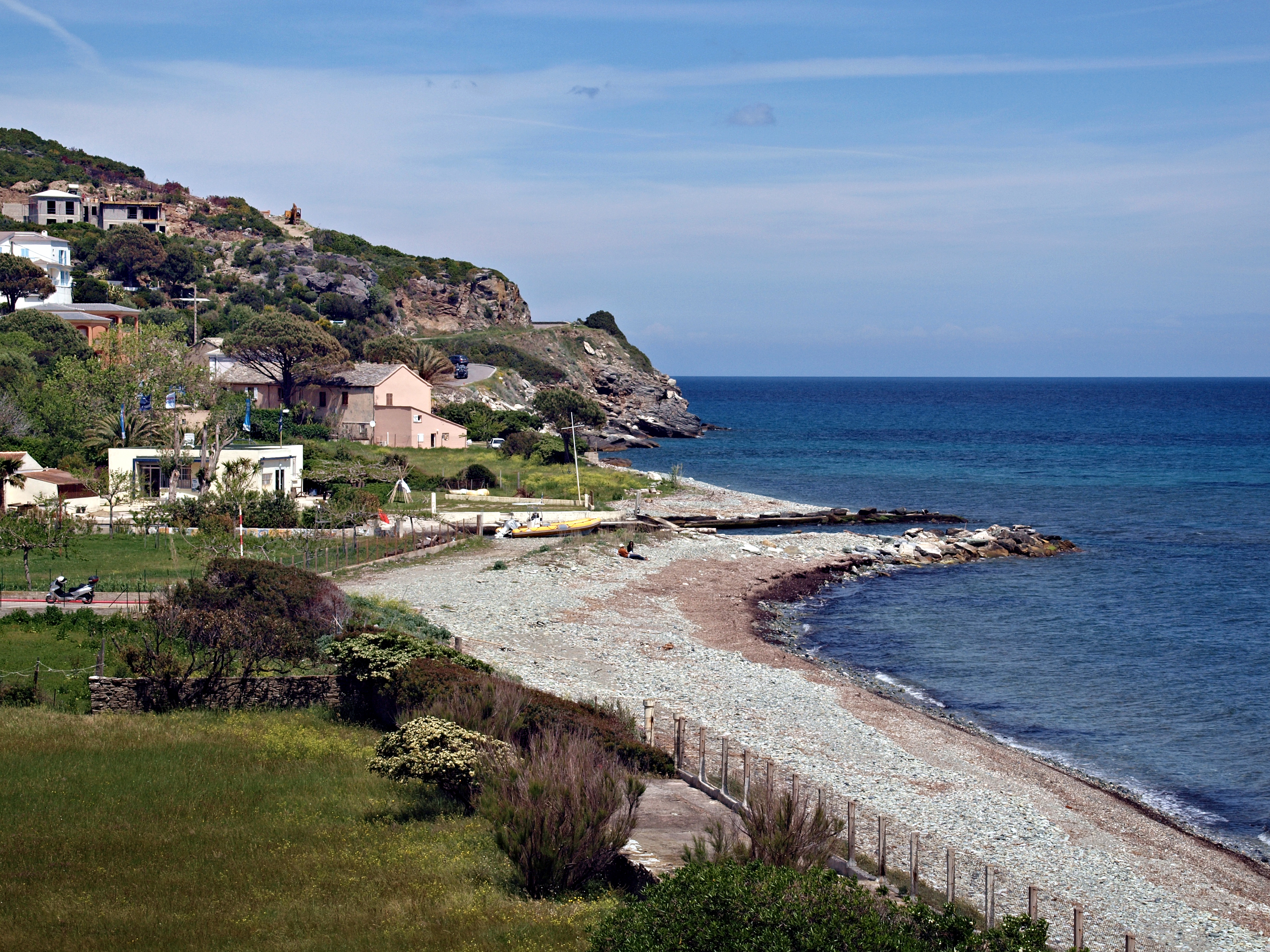
Mouth of the Sisco

The Sisco valley lies between the mountains that form the spine of the Cap Corse peninsula and the sea, and is enclosed between two ridges. The watershed covers 19.8 square kilometres (7.6 sq mi), with a maximum elevation of 1,307 metres (4,288 ft). The watershed is bowl-shaped, with several streams converging to form the stream above the Moine location. Flows of water are carried rapidly downstream. As a result, the Sisco sometimes has severe floods. In 1851 a flood rose to 2 metres (6 ft 7 in) above the stream bed. The village bridge was destroyed by a flood in 1907 and in 1938. Further floods occurred in 1993, 1994 and 1999.

== Water quality ==
In August 2021 the mayor of Sisco banned swimming and fishing in the river due to a report that a visitor may have become infected by bilharzia, carried by the parasite Schistosoma haematobium, while swimming. The disease is very rare in Europe, but had occurred in Corsica in 2014.

== Tributaries ==
The following streams (ruisseaux) are tributaries of the Sisco (ordered by length):

- Porcili 3 km (1.9 mi)
  - Cipriaca 3 km (1.9 mi)
- Eghiglione 2 km (1.2 mi)
- Botru 2 km (1.2 mi)
- Pietratenna 1 km (0.62 mi)
- Guadillu di Lapidanu 1 km (0.62 mi)
- Castagni 1 km (0.62 mi)
- Canavaggia 1 km (0.62 mi)

== Sources ==
- Bonifay, Sébastien (25 August 2021), A Sisco, le maire interdit la baignade et la pêche en rivière, après une suspicion de parasite (in French), France TV
- L’histoire de Sisco (in French), Mairie de Sisco
- Plan de Prevention du Risque Inondation de la Commune de Sisco (PDF) (in French), SOGREAH Consultants, 23 May 2005
- "Relation: Ruisseau de Sisco (9423065)", OpenStreetMap
- "Ruisseau de Sisco", Sandre (in French)
