= Torra di Meria =

Genoese coastal defence tower in Corsica

Tower of Meria
- Torra di Meria (Corsican)
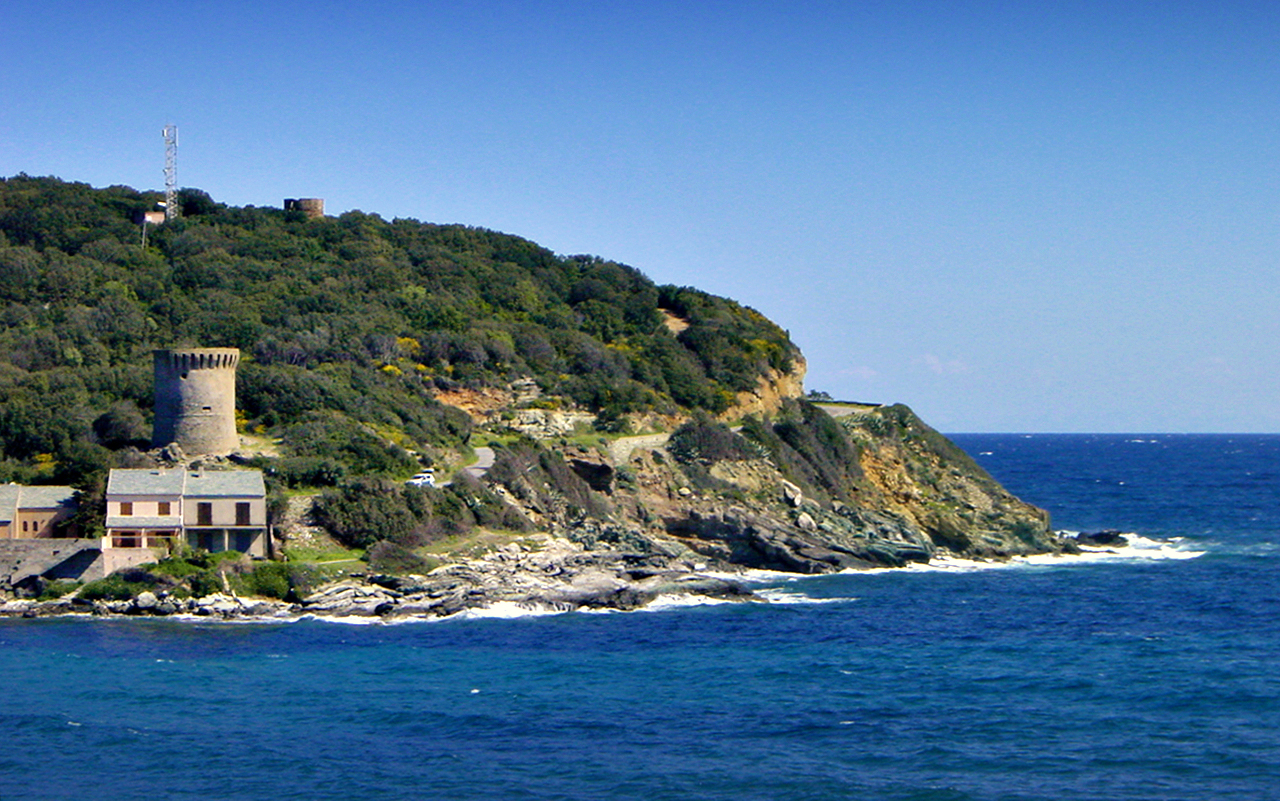

- Location within Corsica
- 42°56′5″N 9°28′2″E

History
- Built: Second half 16th century

The Tower of Meria (Corsican: Torra di Meria) is a ruined Genoese tower in Corsica located in the commune of Meria on the east coast of Cap Corse.

The tower was one of a series of coastal defences constructed by the Republic of Genoa between 1530 and 1620 to stem the attacks by Barbary pirates.

== See also ==
- List of Genoese towers in Corsica
