= Paul Natali =

French politician (1933–2020)

Mayor of Borgo
- In office 1986–1998

General Councillor for the Canton of Borgo
- In office 1998–2005

Member of the French Senate for Haute-Corse
- In office 27 September 1998 – 19 March 2005
- Preceded by: Jean-Baptiste Montroni
- Succeeded by: François Vendasi

Personal details
- Born: 13 November 1933 Saint-Geniès-de-Malgoirès, France
- Died: 31 March 2020 (aged 86) Bastia, France
- Party: RPR; UMP
- Occupation: Politician

Paul Natali (13 November 1933 – 31 March 2020) was a French politician.

== Biography ==
An entrepreneur, Natali was President of CCI Bastia. He served as General Councillor for the Canton of Borgo, and as a Senator for Haute-Corse. He died on 31 March 2020 at the age of 86.
