= Macinaggio =

- Village
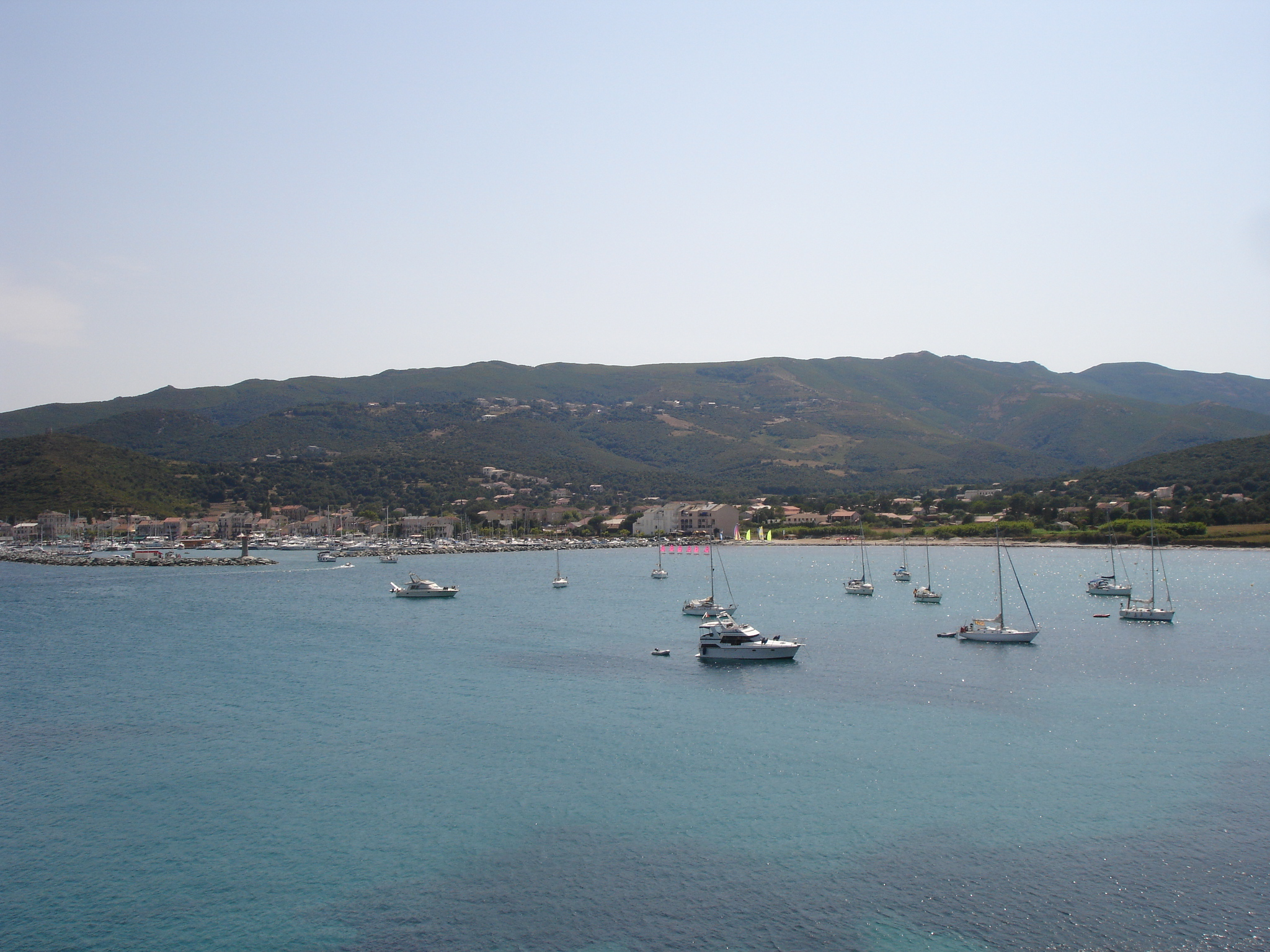
- View of Macinaggio bay and Rogliano (on the hill) in background

- Locator map of Macinaggio in France
- Coordinates: 42°57′32.2″N 9°27′11.09″E
- Country: France
- Region: Corsica
- Department: Haute-Corse
- Arrondissement: Bastia
- Canton: Capobianco
- Municipality: Rogliano
- Elevation: 5 m (16 ft)
- Time zone: UTC+1 (CET)
  - Summer (DST): UTC+2 (CEST)
- Postal code: 20247
- Area code: (+33) ...
- Demonym: Macinagjinchi (in Corsican)

Macinaggio (Corsican: Macinaghju) is a French village, part of the municipality (commune) of Rogliano, in the department of Haute-Corse, Corsica. It also represents the marina of its municipality.

== History ==
Pasquale Paoli landed on July 14, 1790, at the Port of Macinaggio, where he was welcomed by the inhabitants of Rogliano. The local port is also where Napoleon Bonaparte landed on his return from the exile on the island of Elba, in 1814.

== Geography ==
Macinaggio is situated on the north-eastern side of the Cap Corse, by the Tyrrhenian Sea. It is 4,5 km far from Rogliano, 3 from Tomino, 36 from Bastia and lies on the edge of a natural reserve part of "Natura 2000" network, that includes the neighboring islets of Finocchiarola. In south of its urban area is located Maninca, a sea village part of Tomino.

== Transport ==
The village is crossed by the national road D80 and counts a touristic harbor, one of the most actives on the Cap Corse. Nearest airport (Bastia-Poretta) and railway station (Bastia) are located in the town of Bastia.
