= Vignale, Haute-Corse =

Vignale
- Commune
- Location of Vignale
- Location within France Location within Corsica
- Coordinates: 42°32′20″N 9°22′56″E
- Country: France
- Region: Corsica
- Department: Haute-Corse
- Arrondissement: Bastia
- Canton: Borgo

Government
  - Mayor (2020–2026): Charlotte Terrighi
- Area^{1}: 10.69 km^{2} (4.13 sq mi)
- Elevation: 400 m (1,300 ft)
- Highest elevation: 1,151 m (3,776 ft)
- Lowest elevation: 27 m (89 ft)
- Population (2023): 222
  - Density: 20.8/km^{2} (53.8/sq mi)
- Time zone: UTC+01:00 (CET)
  - Summer (DST): UTC+02:00 (CEST)
- INSEE/Postal code: 2B350 /20290
- ^{1} French Land Register data, which excludes lakes, ponds, glaciers > 1 km^{2} (0.386 sq mi or 247 acres) and river estuaries.

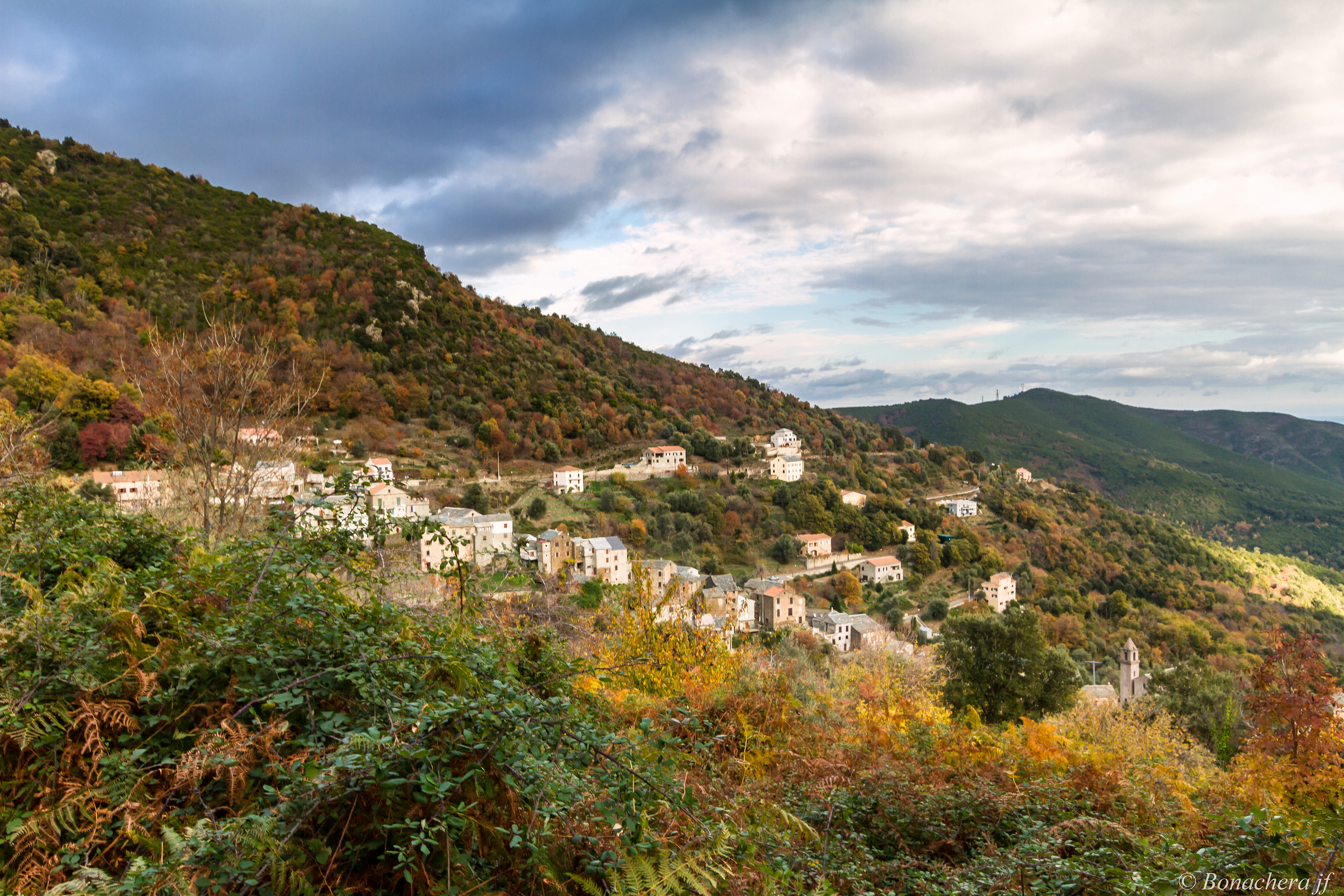
Vue du village de Vignale

Vignale is a commune in the Haute-Corse department of France on the island of Corsica.

== Population ==
Historical population
Year	Pop.	±% p.a.
1968	213	—
1975	210	−0.20%
1982	200	−0.69%
1990	176	−1.59%
1999	165	−0.71%
2007	174	+0.67%
2012	184	+1.12%
2017	160	−2.76%
2023	222	+5.61%
Source: INSEE

== See also ==
- Communes of the Haute-Corse department
