= Torra di Negru =

Genoese coastal defence tower in Corsica

Tower of Negru
- Torra di Negru (Corsican)
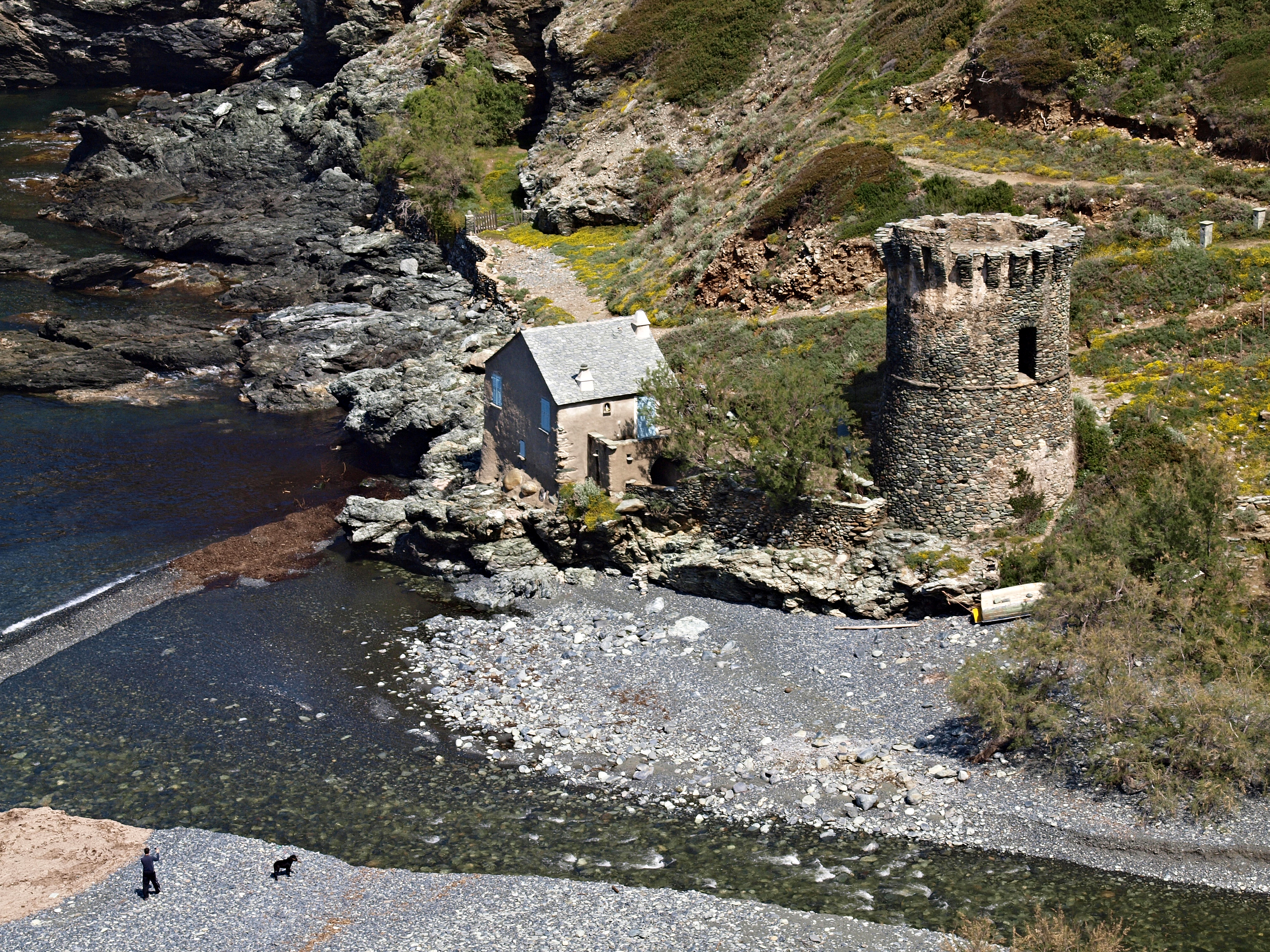

- Location within Corsica
- 42°45′40″N 9°20′25″E

History
- Built: before 1617

Monument historique
- Designated: 27 October 1992
- Reference no.: PA00099285

The Tower of Negru (Corsican: Torra di Negru) is a Genoese tower located in the commune of Olmeta-di-Capocorso (Haute-Corse) on the coast of the Corsica. The tower sits on the shore on the west coast of Capicorsu.

The tower was one of a series of coastal defences built by the Republic of Genoa between 1530 and 1620 to stem the attacks by Barbary pirates. The tower was built in around 1560. It is included in a list compiled by the Genoese authorities in 1617 where it is recorded as being guarded by two men but only at night.

In 1992 the tower was listed as one of the official historical monuments of France.

== See also ==
- List of Genoese towers in Corsica
