= Arrondissement of Bastia =

Coordinates: 42.7008°N 9.4503°E

Bastia
- Arrondissement
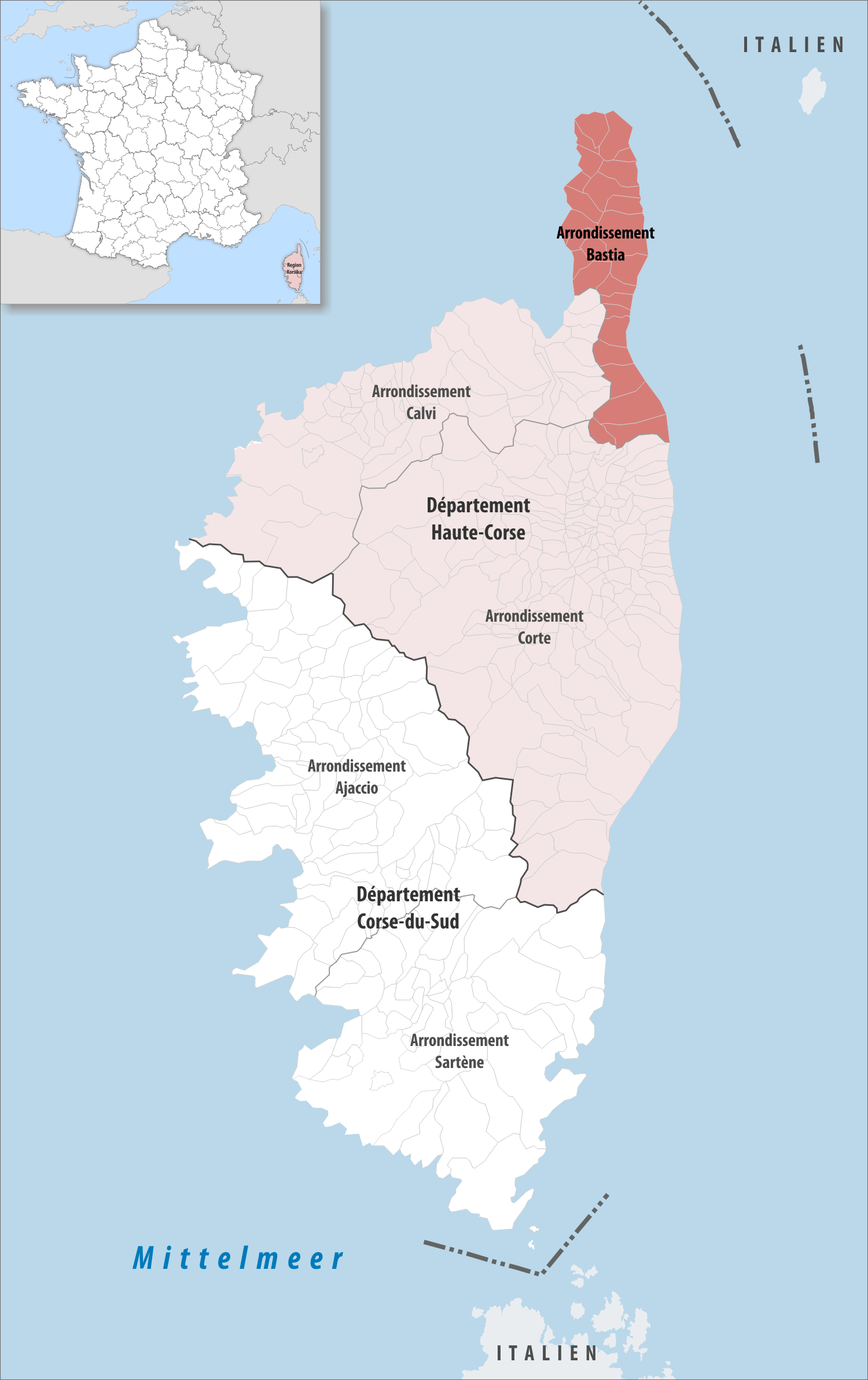
- Location within the region Corsica
- Country: France
- Region: Corsica
- Department: Haute-Corse
- No. of communes: {{{nbcomm}}}
- Area: 473.8 km^{2} (182.9 sq mi)
- Population (2023): 93,433
  - Density: 197.2/km^{2} (510.7/sq mi)
- INSEE code: 2B2

The arrondissement of Bastia (French: arrondissement de Bastia; Corsican: circundariu di Bastìa) is an arrondissement of France in the Haute-Corse department in the territorial collectivity of Corsica. It has 27 communes. Its population is 93,200 (2021), and its area is 473.8 km^{2} (182.9 sq mi).

== Composition ==
The communes of the arrondissement of Bastia, and their INSEE codes, are:

1. Barrettali (2B030)
2. Bastia (2B033)
3. Biguglia (2B037)
4. Borgo (2B042)
5. Brando (2B043)
6. Cagnano (2B046)
7. Canari (2B058)
8. Centuri (2B086)
9. Ersa (2B107)
10. Furiani (2B120)
11. Lucciana (2B148)
12. Luri (2B152)
13. Meria (2B159)
14. Morsiglia (2B170)
15. Nonza (2B178)
16. Ogliastro (2B183)
17. Olcani (2B184)
18. Olmeta-di-Capocorso (2B187)
19. Pietracorbara (2B224)
20. Pino (2B233)
21. Rogliano (2B261)
22. San-Martino-di-Lota (2B305)
23. Santa-Maria-di-Lota (2B309)
24. Sisco (2B281)
25. Tomino (2B327)
26. Vignale (2B350)
27. Ville-di-Pietrabugno (2B353)

== History ==
The arrondissement of Bastia was created as part of the department Golo in 1800. Between 1811 and 1976 it was an arrondissement of the department Corse, since 1976 it has been an arrondissement of the department Haute-Corse. On 1 January 2010, the four cantons of Alto-di-Casaconi, Fiumalto-d'Ampugnani, Campoloro-di-Moriani and Vescovato that previously belonged to the arrondissement of Bastia were added to the arrondissement of Corte, and the two cantons of Le Haut-Nebbio and La Conca-d'Oro to the arrondissement of Calvi.

As a result of the reorganisation of the cantons of France which came into effect in 2015, the borders of the cantons are no longer related to the borders of the arrondissements. The cantons of the arrondissement of Bastia were, as of January 2015:

1. Bastia-1
2. Bastia-2
3. Bastia-3
4. Bastia-4
5. Bastia-5 (Lupino)
6. Bastia-6 (Furiani-Montésoro)
7. Borgo
8. Capobianco
9. Sagro-di-Santa-Giulia
10. San-Martino-di-Lota

== Sub-prefects ==
- Robert Miguet : 1972-1974 : sub-prefect of Bastia
