= Meria, Haute-Corse =

Meria
- Commune
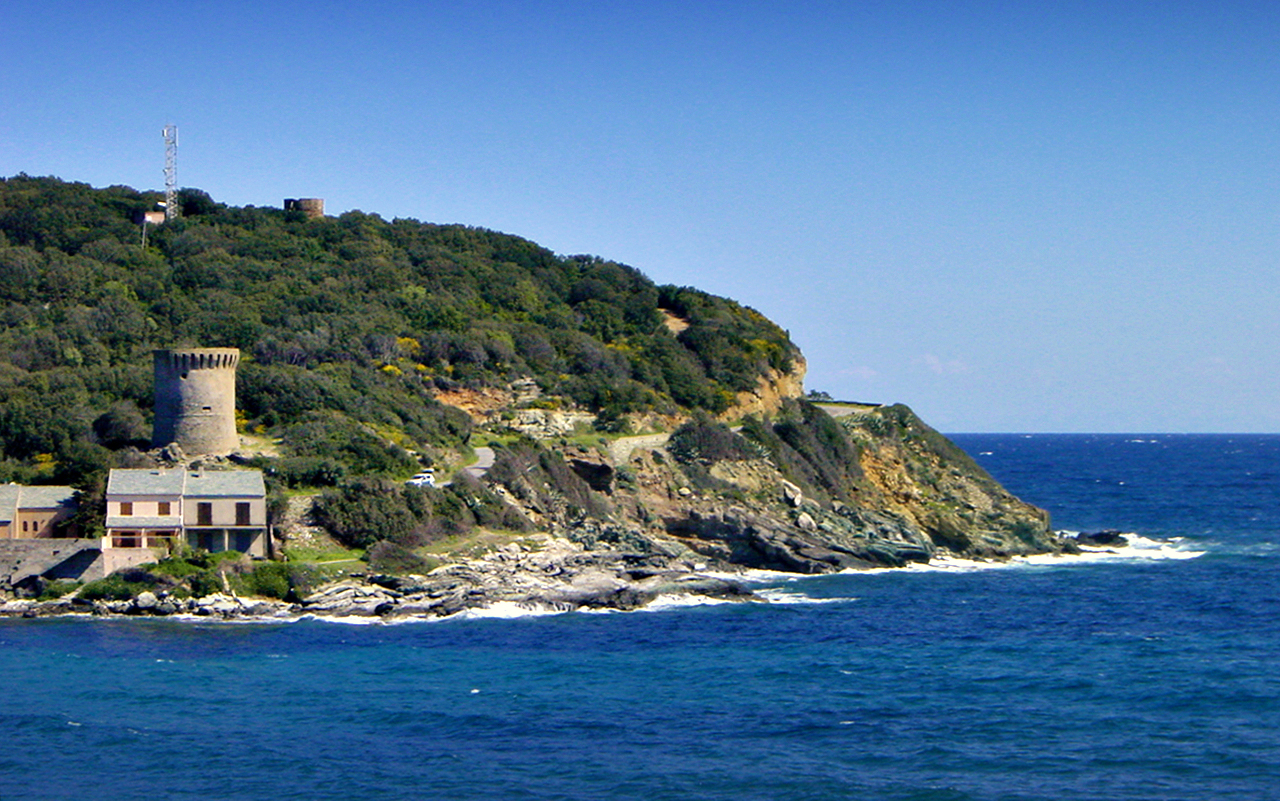
- The Genoese tower in Meria
- Location of Meria
- Location within France Location within Corsica
- Coordinates: 42°55′40″N 9°27′12″E
- Country: France
- Region: Corsica
- Department: Haute-Corse
- Arrondissement: Bastia
- Canton: Cap Corse
- Intercommunality: Cap Corse

Government
  - Mayor (2020–2026): Laurence Piazza
- Area^{1}: 20.43 km^{2} (7.89 sq mi)
- Elevation: 200 m (660 ft)
- Highest elevation: 604 m (1,982 ft)
- Lowest elevation: 0 m (0 ft)
- Population (2023): 81
  - Density: 4.0/km^{2} (10/sq mi)
- Time zone: UTC+01:00 (CET)
  - Summer (DST): UTC+02:00 (CEST)
- INSEE/Postal code: 2B159 /20287
- ^{1} French Land Register data, which excludes lakes, ponds, glaciers > 1 km^{2} (0.386 sq mi or 247 acres) and river estuaries.

Meria is a commune in the Haute-Corse department of France on the island of Corsica.

== Population ==
Historical population
Year	Pop.	±% p.a.
1968	108	—
1975	111	+0.39%
1982	79	−4.74%
1990	76	−0.48%
1999	85	+1.25%
2007	99	+1.92%
2012	99	+0.00%
2017	98	−0.20%
2023	81	−3.13%
Source: INSEE

== See also ==
- Communes of the Haute-Corse department
- Torra di Meria
