= Morsiglia =

- Commune
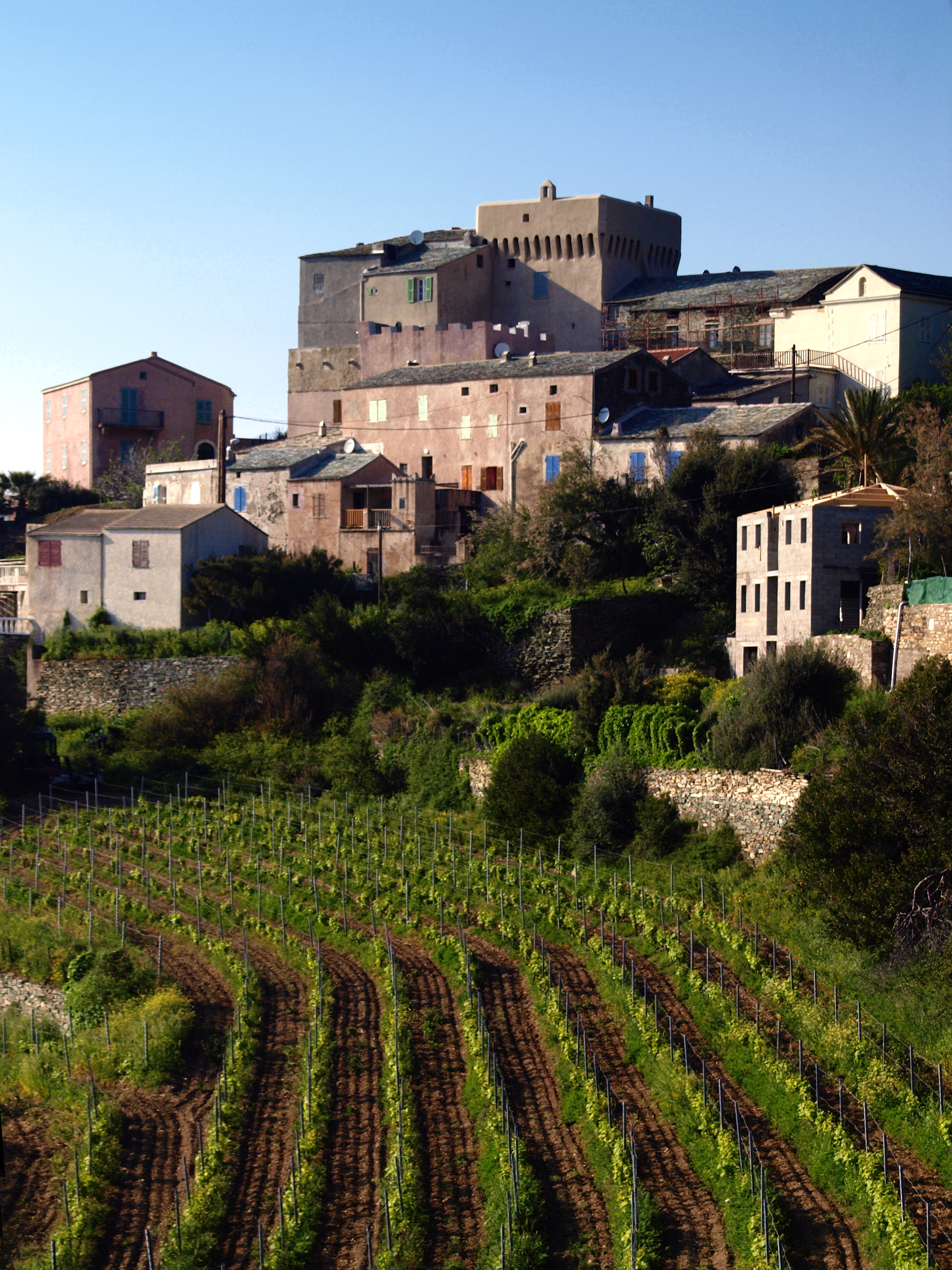
- A view of the hamlet of Stanti, in Morsiglia
- Location of Morsiglia
- Location within France Location within Corsica
- Coordinates: 42°56′47″N 9°21′54″E
- Country: France
- Region: Corsica
- Department: Haute-Corse
- Arrondissement: Bastia
- Canton: Cap Corse
- Intercommunality: Cap Corse

Government
  - Mayor (2020–2026): Marie-Josée Pieralli
- Area^{1}: 13.34 km^{2} (5.15 sq mi)
- Elevation: 200 m (660 ft)
- Highest elevation: 604 m (1,982 ft)
- Lowest elevation: 0 m (0 ft)
- Population (2023): 109
  - Density: 8.17/km^{2} (21.2/sq mi)
- Time zone: UTC+01:00 (CET)
  - Summer (DST): UTC+02:00 (CEST)
- INSEE/Postal code: 2B170 /20238
- ^{1} French Land Register data, which excludes lakes, ponds, glaciers > 1 km^{2} (0.386 sq mi or 247 acres) and river estuaries.

Morsiglia (Corsican: Mursiglia) is a commune in the Haute-Corse department of France on the island of Corsica.

== History ==
From the 9th century to 1197, Morsiglia belonged to the lords of Pevere.lli, then belonging to the Avogari from 1198 to 1248 who ceded the land to Ansaldo da Mare. In 1348, after the death of Galeotto da Mare, known as "Giachetto", who was the great grandson of Ansaldo, his fief was divided between his children Babiano, Bartolomeo, and Nicolas, son of Crescione. Nicolas eventually inherited Morsiglia. The small fiefdom of Morsiglia only lasted for a short time until 1358, when a popular revolt led by Sambucuccio d'Alando expelled the lords from their fiefdoms and replaced them with Caporali.

Morsiglia possessed a castle which was taken in 1558 by the Genoese with their defender Jean d'Ortinola, who was a supporter of France. The castle was almost completely destroyed. Around 1563 to 1583, Morsiglia was ravaged by Barbary pirates.

== Population ==
Historical population
Year	Pop.	±% p.a.
1968	137	—
1975	125	−1.30%
1982	119	−0.70%
1990	110	−0.98%
1999	123	+1.25%
2007	144	+1.99%
2012	138	−0.85%
2017	119	−2.92%
2023	109	−1.45%
Source: INSEE

== See also ==
- Communes of the Haute-Corse department
