= Canari, Haute-Corse =

Canari
- Commune
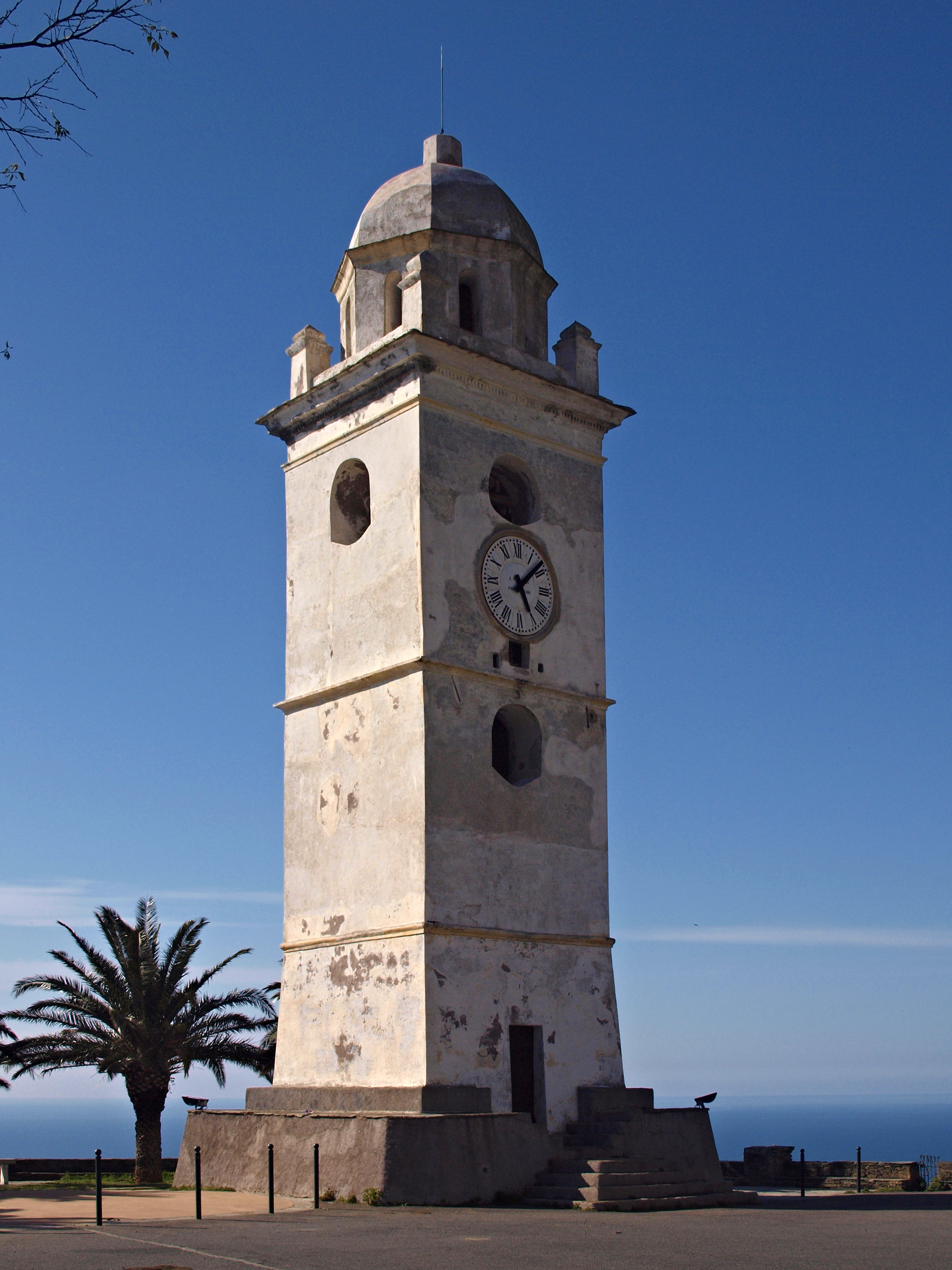
- Bell tower
- Location of Canari
- Location within France Location within Corsica
- Coordinates: 42°50′47″N 9°19′51″E
- Country: France
- Region: Corsica
- Department: Haute-Corse
- Arrondissement: Bastia
- Canton: Cap Corse
- Intercommunality: Cap Corse

Government
  - Mayor (2024–2026): Simon Gassmann
- Area^{1}: 16.67 km^{2} (6.44 sq mi)
- Elevation: 360 m (1,180 ft)
- Highest elevation: 1,268 m (4,160 ft)
- Lowest elevation: 0 m (0 ft)
- Population (2023): 305
  - Density: 18.3/km^{2} (47.4/sq mi)
- Time zone: UTC+01:00 (CET)
  - Summer (DST): UTC+02:00 (CEST)
- INSEE/Postal code: 2B058 /20217
- ^{1} French Land Register data, which excludes lakes, ponds, glaciers > 1 km^{2} (0.386 sq mi or 247 acres) and river estuaries.

Canari (Corsican: Cànari) is a commune in the Haute-Corse department of France on the island of Corsica.

== Population ==
Historical population
Year	Pop.	±% p.a.
1968	583	—
1975	358	−6.73%
1982	331	−1.11%
1990	291	−1.60%
1999	323	+1.17%
2007	325	+0.08%
2012	314	−0.69%
2017	312	−0.13%
2023	305	−0.38%
Source: INSEE

== See also ==
- Communes of the Haute-Corse department
