= Cagnano =

- Commune
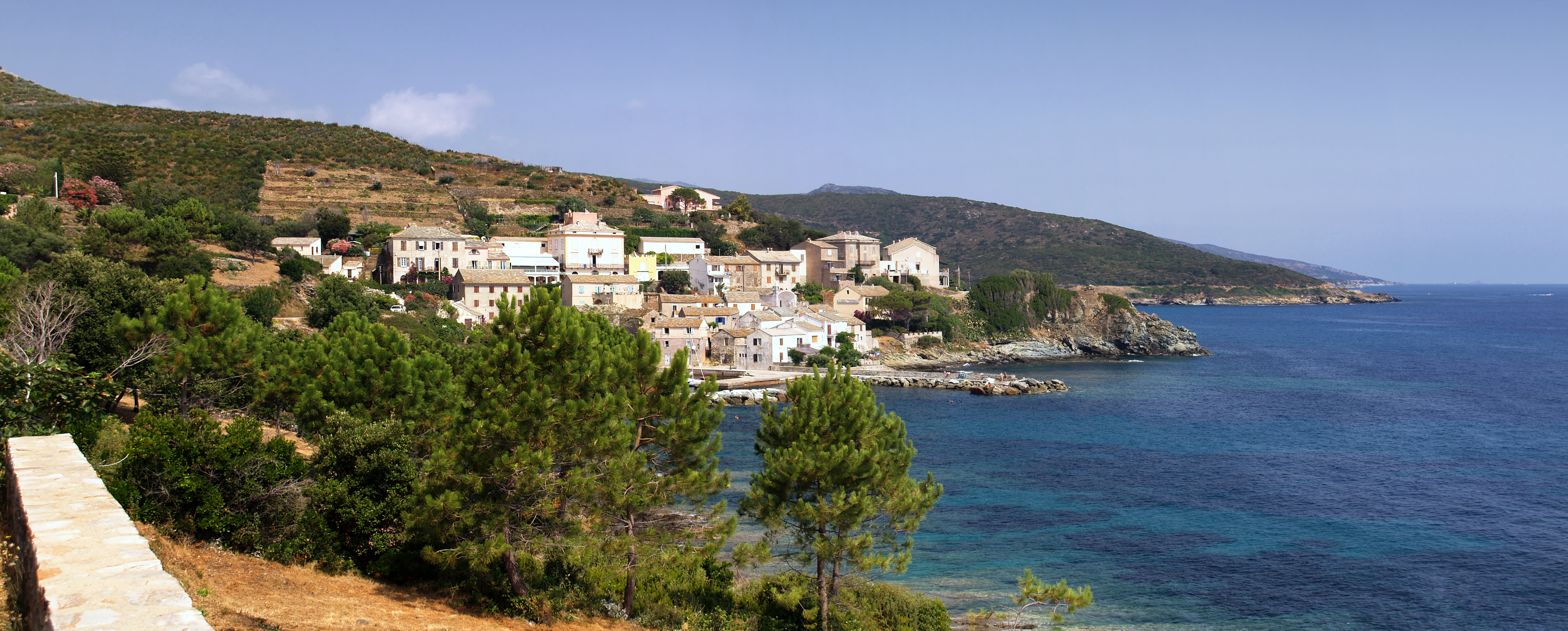
- A view of Cagnano and the coastline
- Location of Cagnano
- Location within France Location within Corsica
- Coordinates: 42°52′34″N 9°25′50″E
- Country: France
- Region: Corsica
- Department: Haute-Corse
- Arrondissement: Bastia
- Canton: Cap Corse
- Intercommunality: Cap Corse

Government
  - Mayor (2020–2026): Catherine Catoni
- Area^{1}: 14.72 km^{2} (5.68 sq mi)
- Elevation: 300 m (980 ft)
- Highest elevation: 1,068 m (3,504 ft)
- Lowest elevation: 0 m (0 ft)
- Population (2023): 148
  - Density: 10.1/km^{2} (26.0/sq mi)
- Time zone: UTC+01:00 (CET)
  - Summer (DST): UTC+02:00 (CEST)
- INSEE/Postal code: 2B046 /20228
- ^{1} French Land Register data, which excludes lakes, ponds, glaciers > 1 km^{2} (0.386 sq mi or 247 acres) and river estuaries.

Cagnano (French pronunciation: [kaɲano]; Corsican: Cagnanu) is a commune in the Haute-Corse department of France on the island of Corsica.

== Population ==
Historical population
Year	Pop.	±% p.a.
1968	245	—
1975	239	−0.35%
1982	183	−3.74%
1990	156	−1.98%
1999	179	+1.54%
2007	196	+1.14%
2012	184	−1.26%
2017	169	−1.69%
2023	148	−2.19%
Source: INSEE

== See also ==
- Communes of the Haute-Corse department
- Torra di l'Osse
