= Ange Leccia =

French artist and filmmaker

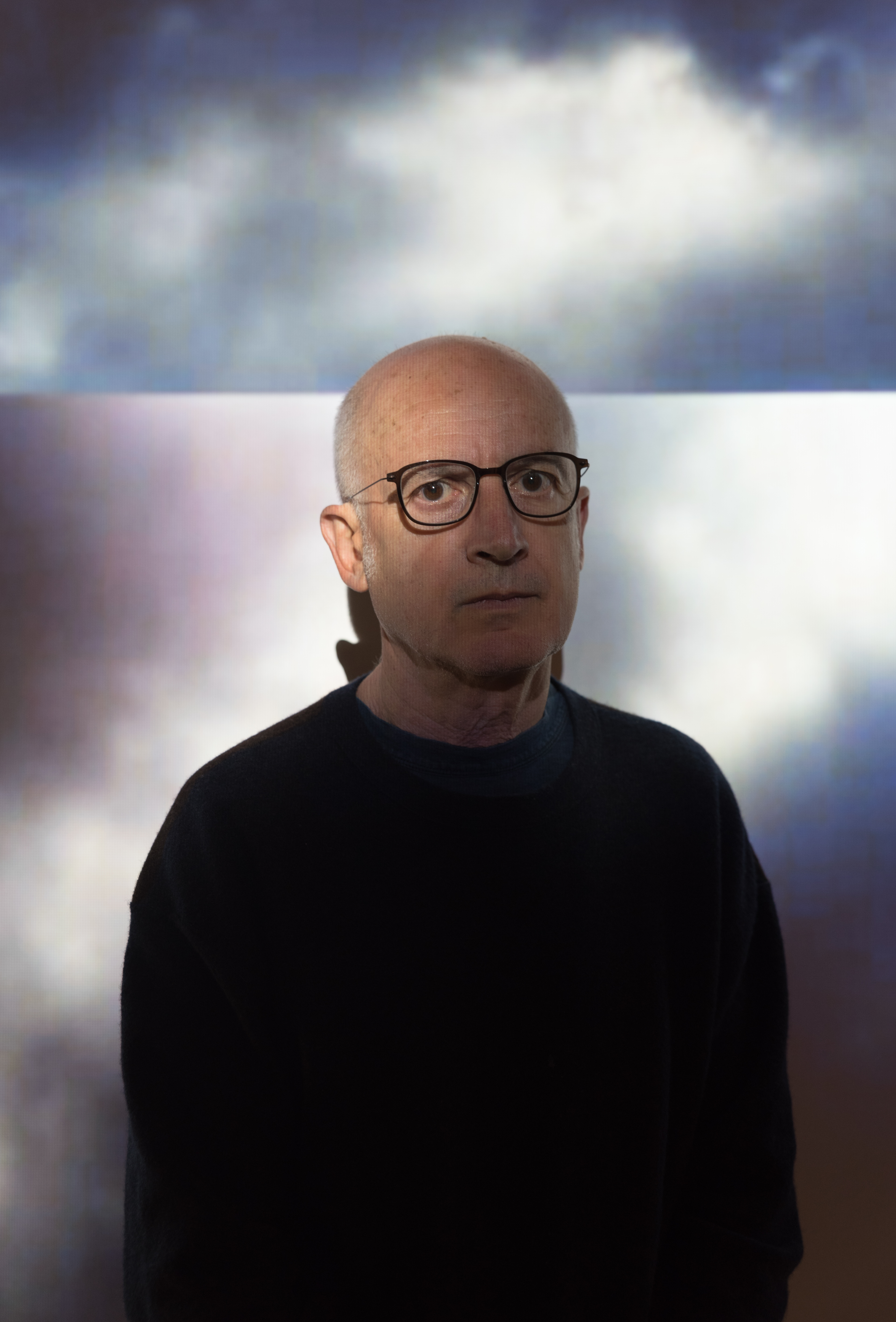
Ange Leccia

Ange Leccia (born 19 April 1952) is a contemporary French painter, photographer and film-maker. He works in Paris primarily with photography and video.

== Life and career ==
Leccia was born in Minerbio, Barrettali commune, in Corsica, and studied fine arts. Initially he was engaged in both painting and photography, but as time passed he devoted himself more to photography and video as his chosen media.

Leccia is a lecturer at the École nationale supérieure d'arts de Cergy-Pontoise (ENSAPC). He also directs research for young artists at the Palais de Tokyo in Paris.

Leccia's first film was the short, Stridura, in 1980. In December 2004, his film Azé, made in 1999, was released. Like his earlier work, such as the shorts Île de beauté (Island of Beauty) (1996) and Gold (2000), both co-produced with Dominique Gonzalez-Foerster, in Azé Ange Leccia continued to stress the light and sound effects.

== Selected exhibitions ==
- 2004 : Chateau de Tours, France
- 2003 : Galerie Almine Rech, Paris, France
- 1999 : National Museum of Contemporary Art, Oslo, Norway
- 1998 : Musée Nicéphore Nièpce, Chalon-sur-Saône, France
- 1996 : Villa Medici, Rome, Italy
- 1995 : Art at the Edge, Atlanta, USA
- 1992 : Contemporary Art Museum, Houston, USA
- 1990 : Le Magasin, CNAC, Grenoble, France
- 1985 : ARC / Musée d'Art Moderne de la Ville de Paris, France
