= Sisco, Haute-Corse =

Sisco
- Commune
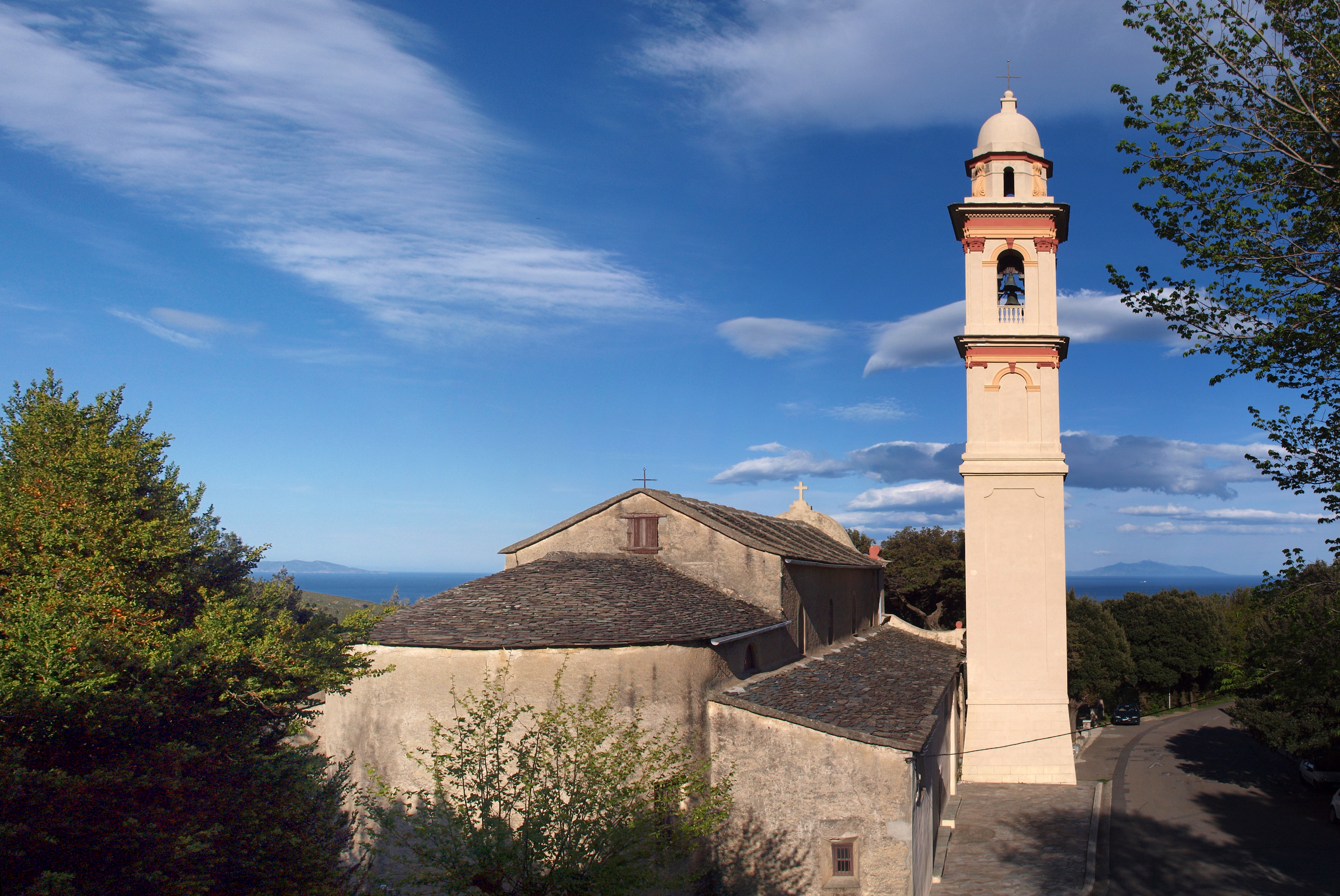
- The church of Saint-Martin, in Sisco
- Location of Sisco
- Location within France Location within Corsica
- Coordinates: 42°49′01″N 9°26′12″E
- Country: France
- Region: Corsica
- Department: Haute-Corse
- Arrondissement: Bastia
- Canton: Cap Corse
- Intercommunality: Cap Corse

Government
  - Mayor (2020–2026): Ange-Pierre Vivoni
- Area^{1}: 24.96 km^{2} (9.64 sq mi)
- Elevation: 500 m (1,600 ft)
- Highest elevation: 1,324 m (4,344 ft)
- Lowest elevation: 0 m (0 ft)
- Population (2023): 1,182
  - Density: 47.36/km^{2} (122.7/sq mi)
- Time zone: UTC+01:00 (CET)
  - Summer (DST): UTC+02:00 (CEST)
- INSEE/Postal code: 2B281 /20233
- ^{1} French Land Register data, which excludes lakes, ponds, glaciers > 1 km^{2} (0.386 sq mi or 247 acres) and river estuaries.

Sisco (French pronunciation: [sisko]; Corsican: Siscu) is a commune in the Haute-Corse department of France on the island of Corsica. It takes its name from the Ruisseau de Sisco, which flows through the commune and enters the Tyrrhenian Sea in the village of Sisco.

== Geography ==
=== Climate ===
Sisco has a hot-summer mediterranean climate (Köppen climate classification Csa). The average annual temperature in Sisco is 17.1 °C (62.8 °F). The average annual rainfall is 772.3 mm (30.41 in) with October as the wettest month. The temperatures are highest on average in August, at around 25.4 °C (77.7 °F), and lowest in February, at around 10.3 °C (50.5 °F). The highest temperature ever recorded in Sisco was 36.0 °C (96.8 °F) on 6 August 2017; the coldest temperature ever recorded was −3.0 °C (26.6 °F) on 1 February 1979.

Climate data for Cape Sagro, Sisco (1991–2020 averages, extremes 1979−present)
Month	Jan	Feb	Mar	Apr	May	Jun	Jul	Aug	Sep	Oct	Nov	Dec	Year
Record high °C (°F)	21.2 (70.2)	22.9 (73.2)	25.0 (77.0)	25.7 (78.3)	30.6 (87.1)	34.3 (93.7)	36.0 (96.8)	36.0 (96.8)	31.0 (87.8)	29.0 (84.2)	26.0 (78.8)	23.4 (74.1)	36.0 (96.8)
Mean daily maximum °C (°F)	13.2 (55.8)	13.2 (55.8)	15.0 (59.0)	17.3 (63.1)	21.1 (70.0)	25.0 (77.0)	28.0 (82.4)	28.7 (83.7)	25.2 (77.4)	21.3 (70.3)	17.1 (62.8)	14.3 (57.7)	20.0 (68.0)
Daily mean °C (°F)	10.6 (51.1)	10.3 (50.5)	12.1 (53.8)	14.4 (57.9)	18.1 (64.6)	21.8 (71.2)	24.8 (76.6)	25.4 (77.7)	22.1 (71.8)	18.6 (65.5)	14.6 (58.3)	11.8 (53.2)	17.1 (62.8)
Mean daily minimum °C (°F)	8.0 (46.4)	7.4 (45.3)	9.2 (48.6)	11.5 (52.7)	15.0 (59.0)	18.7 (65.7)	21.6 (70.9)	22.2 (72.0)	19.0 (66.2)	15.9 (60.6)	12.1 (53.8)	9.3 (48.7)	14.2 (57.6)
Record low °C (°F)	−3.0 (26.6)	−2.5 (27.5)	−0.5 (31.1)	2.5 (36.5)	5.0 (41.0)	7.0 (44.6)	11.0 (51.8)	14.0 (57.2)	9.8 (49.6)	5.6 (42.1)	1.5 (34.7)	−2.0 (28.4)	−3.0 (26.6)
Average precipitation mm (inches)	56.2 (2.21)	61.8 (2.43)	62.2 (2.45)	71.4 (2.81)	52.4 (2.06)	38.2 (1.50)	11.5 (0.45)	22.5 (0.89)	70.0 (2.76)	110.6 (4.35)	123.9 (4.88)	89.6 (3.53)	772.3 (30.41)
Average precipitation days (≥ 1.0 mm)	6.5	7.0	7.0	7.1	5.4	3.2	1.4	2.1	5.3	8.2	10.0	8.3	71.4
Source: Météo-France

== Population ==
Historical population
Year	Pop.	±% p.a.
1968	497	—
1975	501	+0.11%
1982	514	+0.37%
1990	616	+2.29%
1999	743	+2.10%
2007	923	+2.75%
2012	1,030	+2.22%
2017	1,169	+2.56%
2023	1,182	+0.18%
Source: INSEE

== See also ==
- Communes of the Haute-Corse department
