= Canton of Bastia-6 =

French canton

Coordinates: 42°42′03″N 9°27′01″E

The Canton of Bastia-6 (Furiani-Montésoro) is a former canton of the arrondissement of Bastia, in the Haute-Corse department, France. It had 14,541 inhabitants (2012). It was disbanded following the French canton reorganisation which came into effect in March 2015.

The canton comprised the following communes:

- Bastia (partly)
- Furiani
