= Barrettali =

Barrettali Corsican: Barettali
- Commune
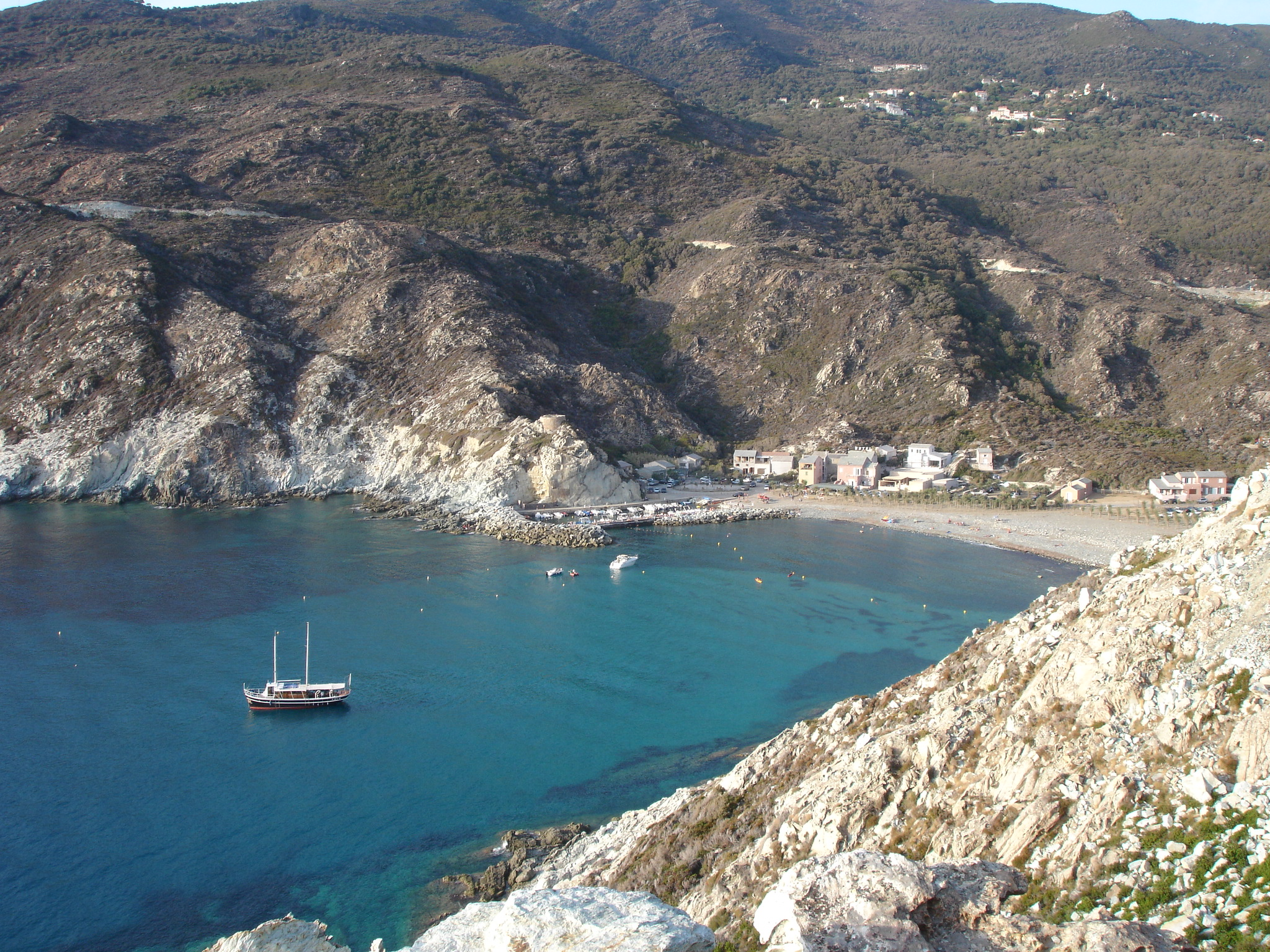
- The bay at Conchiglio
- Location of Barrettali
- Location within France Location within Corsica
- Coordinates: 42°52′41″N 9°21′21″E
- Country: France
- Region: Corsica
- Department: Haute-Corse
- Arrondissement: Bastia
- Canton: Cap Corse
- Intercommunality: Cap Corse

Government
  - Mayor (2020–2026): Dominique Baccarelli
- Area^{1}: 18.07 km^{2} (6.98 sq mi)
- Elevation: 300 m (980 ft)
- Highest elevation: 1,160 m (3,810 ft)
- Lowest elevation: 0 m (0 ft)
- Population (2023): 174
  - Density: 9.63/km^{2} (24.9/sq mi)
- Time zone: UTC+01:00 (CET)
  - Summer (DST): UTC+02:00 (CEST)
- INSEE/Postal code: 2B030 /20228
- ^{1} French Land Register data, which excludes lakes, ponds, glaciers > 1 km^{2} (0.386 sq mi or 247 acres) and river estuaries.

Barrettali (French pronunciation: [baʁɛtali]; Corsican: Barettali; Italian: Barrettali) is a commune in the Haute-Corse department of France on the island of Corsica.

Among the villages in the commune is the hamlet of Minerbio.

== Population ==
Historical population
Year	Pop.	±% p.a.
1968	232	—
1975	186	−3.11%
1982	145	−3.49%
1990	138	−0.62%
1999	131	−0.58%
2007	159	+2.45%
2012	131	−3.80%
2017	133	+0.30%
2023	174	+4.58%
Source: INSEE

== Personalities ==
- Ange Leccia (b. 1952 in Minerbio), photographer and video artist;
- Jean-Pierre Santini, writer and editor autonomist clandestine (editions A Fior di Carta);
- Alexandre Bodak, a doctor, a composer and a virtuoso pianist.

== See also ==
- Communes of the Haute-Corse department
