= Canton of Bastia-5 =

Coordinates: 42°42′03″N 9°27′01″E

The Canton of Bastia-5 (French: canton de Bastia-5; Corsican: cantone di Bastìa-5), also known as Lupino or Lupinu, is a former canton of the arrondissement of Bastia, in the department of Haute-Corse, Corsica France. It had 8,144 inhabitants (2012). It was disbanded following the French canton reorganisation which came into effect in March 2015. It comprised part of the commune of Bastia.
