= Torra di Scalu =

Genoese coastal defence tower in Corsica

Tower of Scalu
- Torra di Scalu (Corsican)
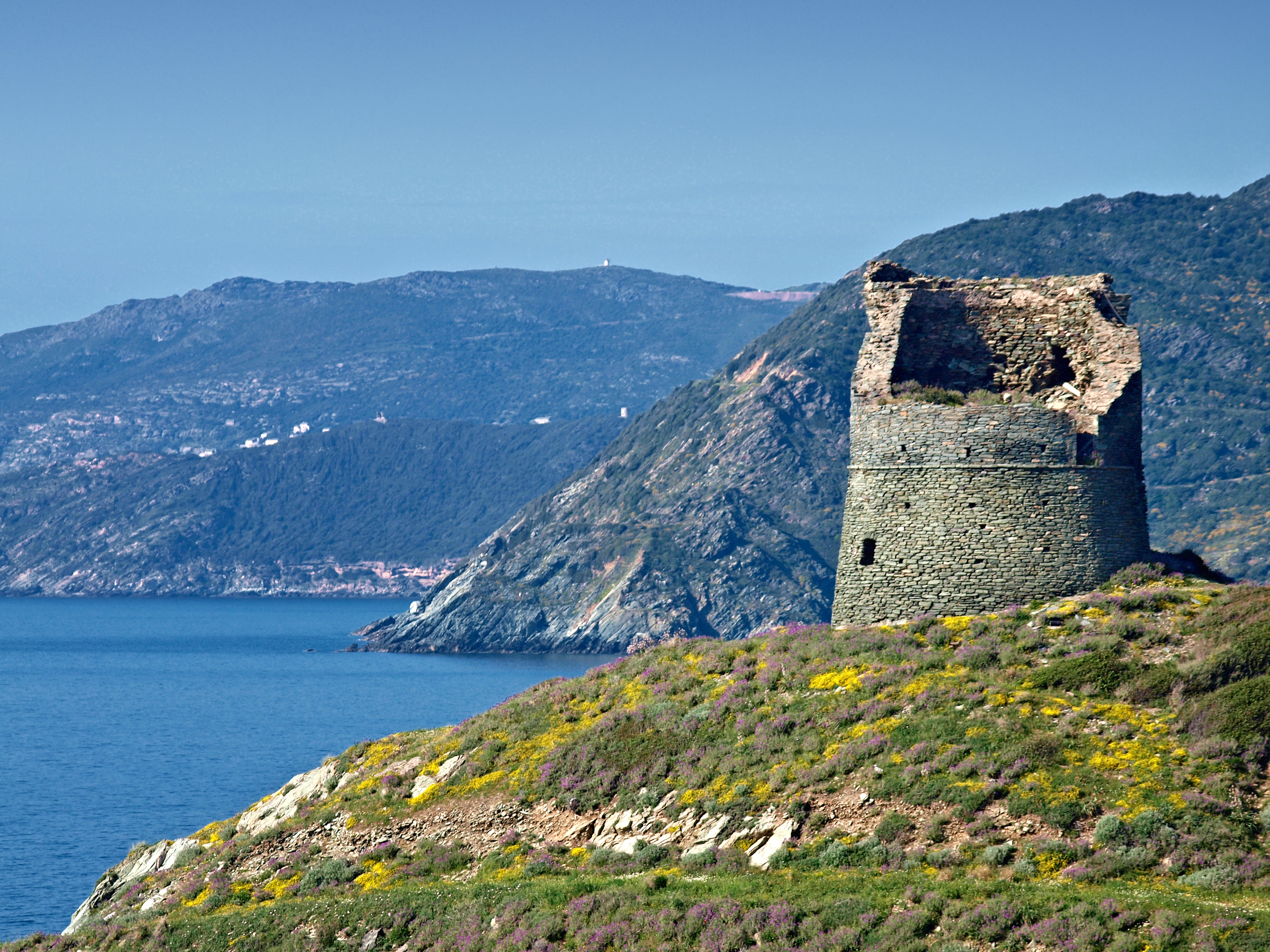

- Location within Corsica
- 42°54′42″N 9°20′41″E

History
- Built: Second half of 16th century

The Tower of Scalu or Tower of Pino (Corsican: Torra di Scalu) is a ruined Genoese tower located in the commune of Pino, Haute-Corse on the west coast of Corsica.

The tower was one of a series of coastal defences constructed by the Republic of Genoa between 1530 and 1620 to stem the attacks by Barbary pirates.

== See also ==
- List of Genoese towers in Corsica
