= Olmeta-di-Capocorso =

Olmeta-di-Capocorso Olmeta di Capicorsu (Corsican)
- Commune
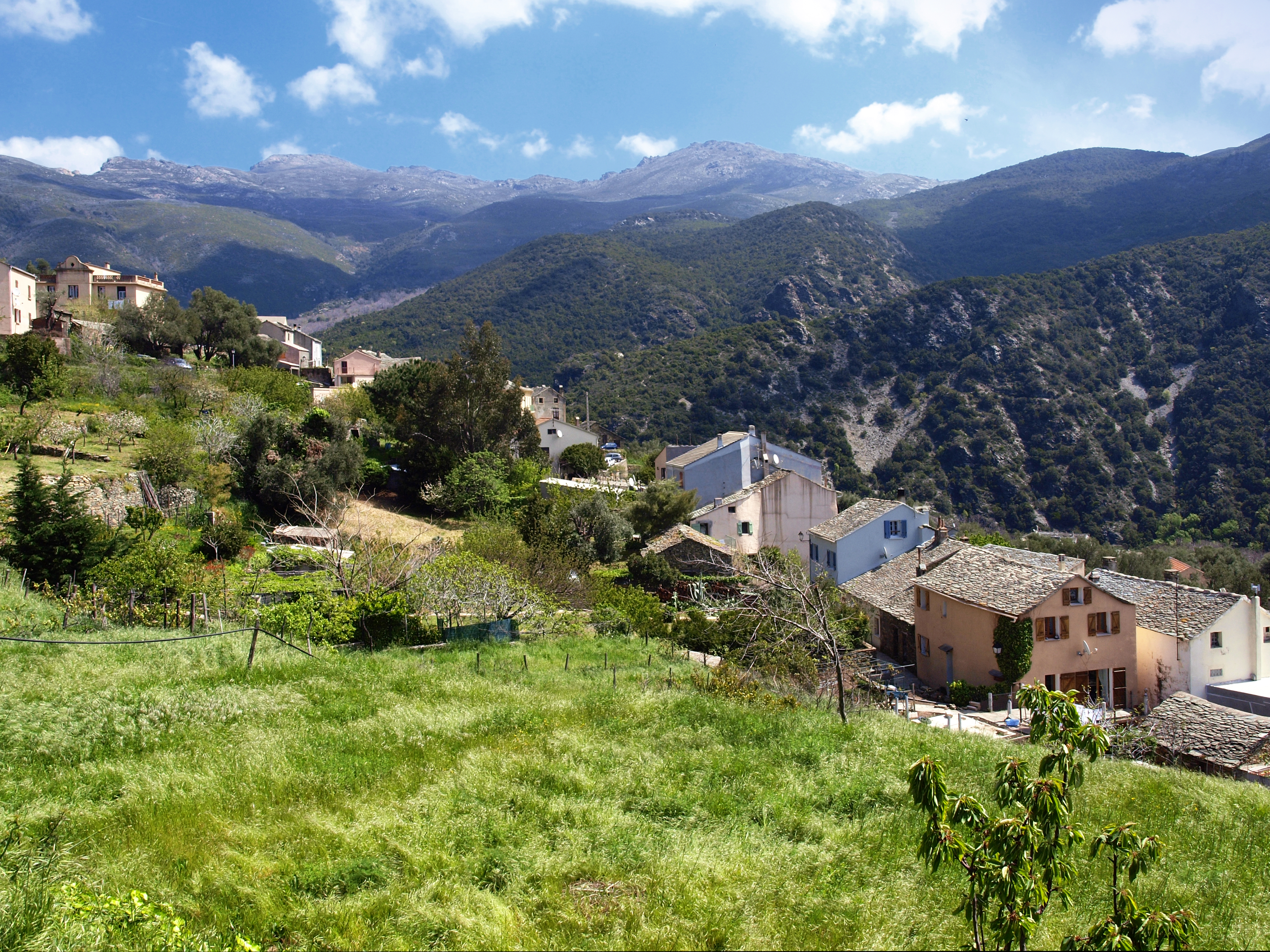
- The hamlet of Piazze, in Olmeta-di-Capocorso
- Location of Olmeta-di-Capocorso
- Location within France Location within Corsica
- Coordinates: 42°46′10″N 9°22′19″E
- Country: France
- Region: Corsica
- Department: Haute-Corse
- Arrondissement: Bastia
- Canton: Cap Corse
- Intercommunality: Cap Corse

Government
  - Mayor (2020–2026): Mireille Boncompagni
- Area^{1}: 21.57 km^{2} (8.33 sq mi)
- Elevation: 200 m (660 ft)
- Highest elevation: 1,306 m (4,285 ft)
- Lowest elevation: 0 m (0 ft)
- Population (2023): 123
  - Density: 5.70/km^{2} (14.8/sq mi)
- Time zone: UTC+01:00 (CET)
  - Summer (DST): UTC+02:00 (CEST)
- INSEE/Postal code: 2B187 /20217
- ^{1} French Land Register data, which excludes lakes, ponds, glaciers > 1 km^{2} (0.386 sq mi or 247 acres) and river estuaries.

Olmeta-di-Capocorso (Corsican: Olmeta di Capicorsu) is a commune in the Haute-Corse department of France on the island of Corsica.

The commune is on the west coast of the Cap Corse peninsula. The Olmeta river flows through the commune and enters the sea in the village of Negru.

== Population ==
Historical population
Year	Pop.	±% p.a.
1968	210	—
1975	175	−2.57%
1982	126	−4.58%
1990	104	−2.37%
1999	112	+0.83%
2007	129	+1.78%
2012	144	+2.22%
2017	142	−0.28%
2023	123	−2.37%
Source: INSEE

== See also ==
- Communes of the Haute-Corse department
- Torra di Negru
