= Ogliastro =

- Commune
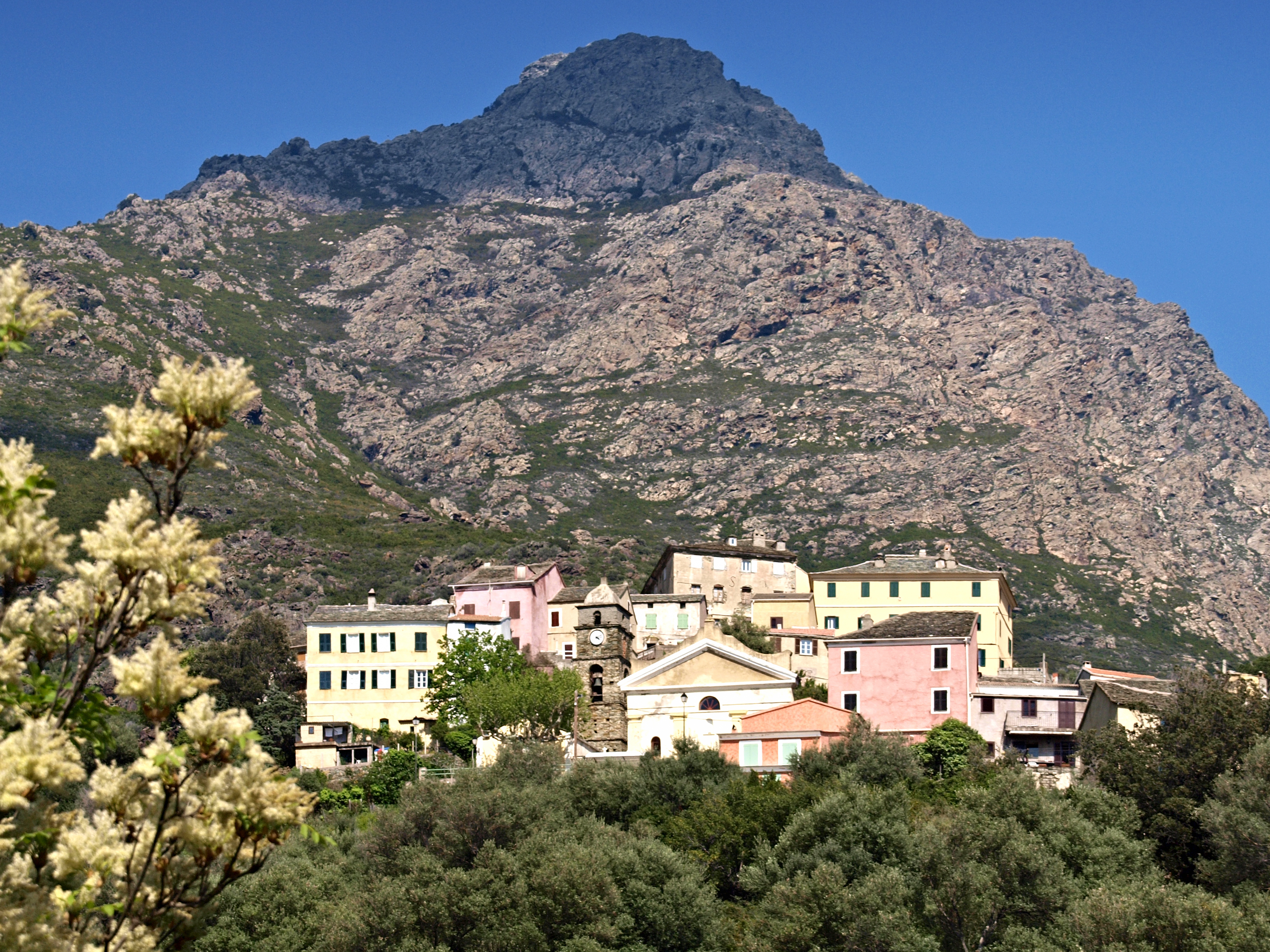
- A view of the village of Ogliastro
- Location of Ogliastro
- Location within France Location within Corsica
- Coordinates: 42°49′09″N 9°21′02″E
- Country: France
- Region: Corsica
- Department: Haute-Corse
- Arrondissement: Bastia
- Canton: Cap Corse
- Intercommunality: Cap Corse

Government
  - Mayor (2020–2026): Jean Toussaint Morganti
- Area^{1}: 9.49 km^{2} (3.66 sq mi)
- Elevation: 130 m (430 ft)
- Highest elevation: 1,324 m (4,344 ft)
- Lowest elevation: 0 m (0 ft)
- Population (2023): 90
  - Density: 9.5/km^{2} (25/sq mi)
- Time zone: UTC+01:00 (CET)
  - Summer (DST): UTC+02:00 (CEST)
- INSEE/Postal code: 2B183 /20217
- ^{1} French Land Register data, which excludes lakes, ponds, glaciers > 1 km^{2} (0.386 sq mi or 247 acres) and river estuaries.

Ogliastro is a commune in the Haute-Corse department of France on the island of Corsica.

== Population ==
Historical population
| Year | Pop. | ±% p.a. |
|---|---|---|
| 1968 | 218 | — |
| 1975 | 146 | −5.57% |
| 1982 | 100 | −5.26% |
| 1990 | 78 | −3.06% |
| 1999 | 96 | +2.33% |
| 2007 | 107 | +1.37% |
| 2012 | 104 | −0.57% |
| 2017 | 99 | −0.98% |
| 2023 | 90 | −1.58% |
Source: INSEE

== See also ==
- Communes of the Haute-Corse department
- Tour d'Albo
