= Tomino, Haute-Corse =

Tomino
- Commune
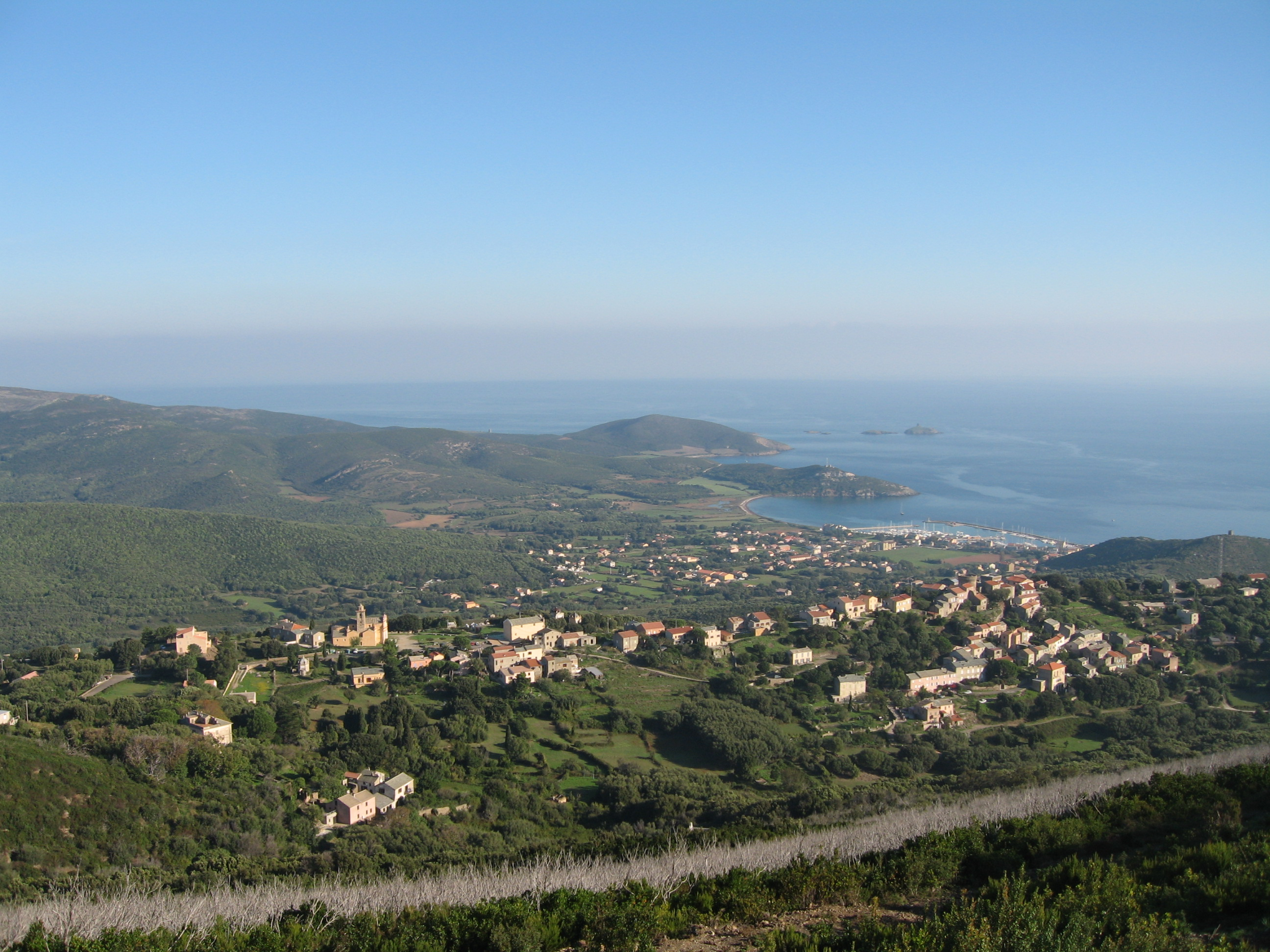
- A view of Tomino, overlooking the port of Macinaggio
- Location of Tomino
- Location within France Location within Corsica
- Coordinates: 42°56′48″N 9°26′36″E
- Country: France
- Region: Corsica
- Department: Haute-Corse
- Arrondissement: Bastia
- Canton: Cap Corse
- Intercommunality: Cap Corse

Government
  - Mayor (2020–2026): François Orlandi
- Area^{1}: 5.8 km^{2} (2.2 sq mi)
- Elevation: 200 m (660 ft)
- Highest elevation: 414 m (1,358 ft)
- Lowest elevation: 0 m (0 ft)
- Population (2023): 184
  - Density: 32/km^{2} (82/sq mi)
- Time zone: UTC+01:00 (CET)
  - Summer (DST): UTC+02:00 (CEST)
- INSEE/Postal code: 2B327 /20248
- ^{1} French Land Register data, which excludes lakes, ponds, glaciers > 1 km^{2} (0.386 sq mi or 247 acres) and river estuaries.

Tomino (French pronunciation: [tɔmino]; Corsican: Tuminu) is a commune in the Haute-Corse department of France on the island of Corsica.

== Population ==
Historical population
| Year | Pop. | ±% p.a. |
|---|---|---|
| 1968 | 130 | — |
| 1975 | 147 | +1.77% |
| 1982 | 178 | +2.77% |
| 1990 | 193 | +1.02% |
| 1999 | 186 | −0.41% |
| 2007 | 218 | +2.00% |
| 2012 | 202 | −1.51% |
| 2017 | 208 | +0.59% |
| 2023 | 184 | −2.02% |
Source: INSEE

== See also ==
- Macinaggio
- Communes of the Haute-Corse department
