= Pino, Haute-Corse =

Pino
- Commune
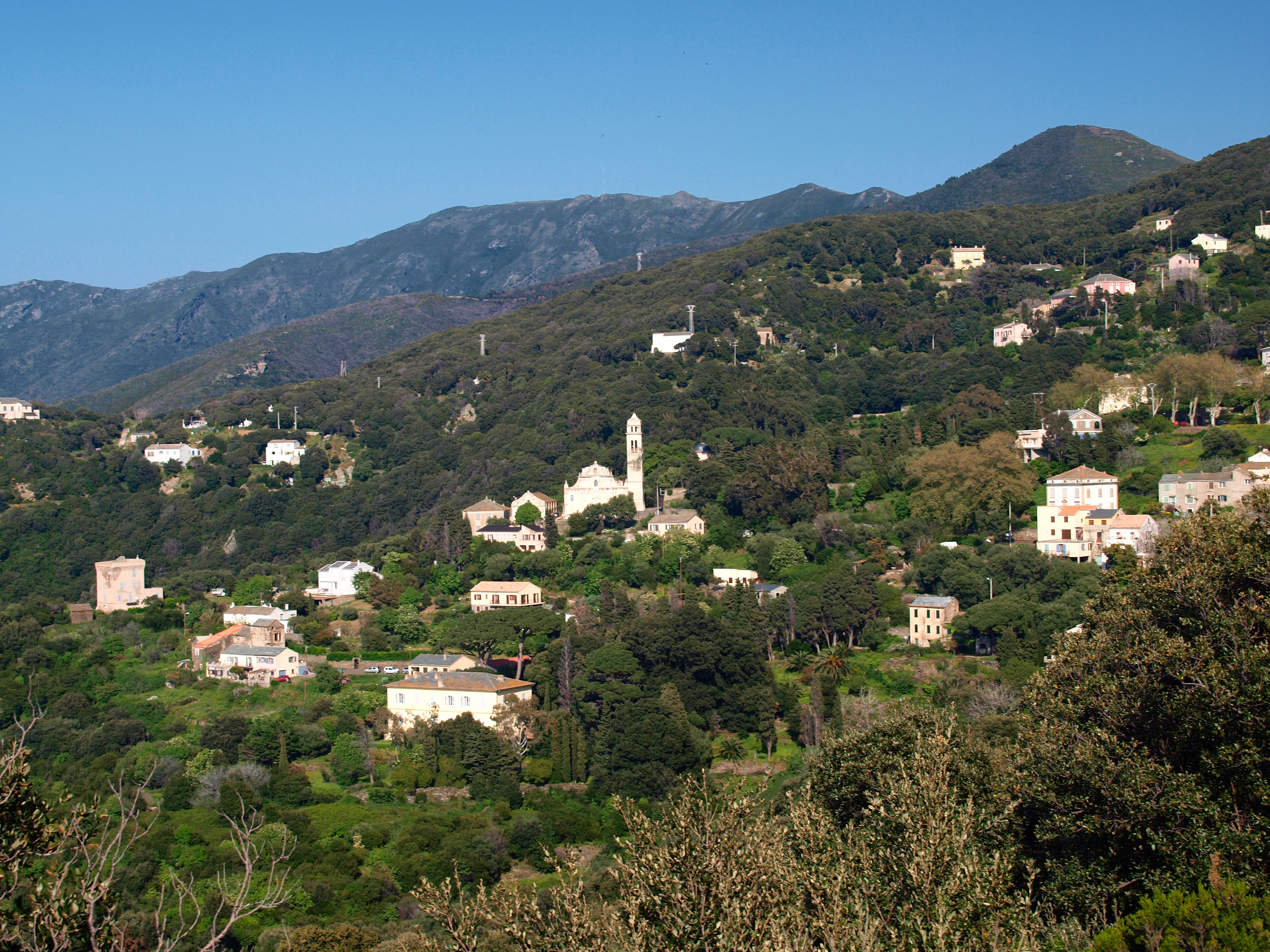
- The church and surrounding buildings in Pino
- Location of Pino
- Location within France Location within Corsica
- Coordinates: 42°54′32″N 9°21′06″E
- Country: France
- Region: Corsica
- Department: Haute-Corse
- Arrondissement: Bastia
- Canton: Cap Corse
- Intercommunality: Cap Corse

Government
  - Mayor (2020–2026): Francis Mazotti
- Area^{1}: 7.04 km^{2} (2.72 sq mi)
- Elevation: 250 m (820 ft)
- Highest elevation: 836 m (2,743 ft)
- Lowest elevation: 0 m (0 ft)
- Population (2023): 148
  - Density: 21.0/km^{2} (54.4/sq mi)
- Time zone: UTC+01:00 (CET)
  - Summer (DST): UTC+02:00 (CEST)
- INSEE/Postal code: 2B233 /20228
- ^{1} French Land Register data, which excludes lakes, ponds, glaciers > 1 km^{2} (0.386 sq mi or 247 acres) and river estuaries.

Pino (French pronunciation: [pino]; Corsican: Pinu) is a commune in the Haute-Corse department of France on the island of Corsica.

== Geography ==
The town of Pino is located in the Eastern "Alpine Corsica", a distinction limited to the northeast of the island, composed of various terrains, originating from a former oceanic crust called Liguro-Piedmontese (a Tethys Ocean whose age is between -170 to -60 Ma) and its continental margins. In this part of Corsica, it is distinguished that the metamorphic schists or "lustrous schists" and the ophiolites of Cap Corse are of Jurassic and Cretaceous age.

The commune occupies an "alveolus" in the western Cap Corse, a valley surrounded by mountains to the north, east, and south, which are also its territorial limits. Starting from the coast south of the Anse d'Aliso, its boundaries follow a ridge line from Punta d'Alisgia (155 m), Punta Pastricciola (305 m), to Monte Popolu (520 m). It then follows the Cape ridge southwards over the Bocca di Santa Lucia pass (387 m), beneath which lies the Santa Lucia chapel, past the Tour de Sénèque (566 m), Monte Rotto (630 m - Luri), Punta Rasiccia (714 m), and Monte Ventigliole (712 m) towards Monte Grofilieta (836 m). From there, it heads back west towards the sea, passing Monte Cupieta (756 m), Punta di Caterraggio (514 m), Punta di Piestrone (430 m), and follows the course of the small river, fiume di Mare Morto, to the coast.

=== Hydrography ===
On Pino's seafront are the mouths of six small rivers, all of which rise from the heights of the Pino Valley. From North to South, they are: the di Marinascu, the di Fichetu, the di Sorbinca, the di A Pietra, the di Cucchiara, and the di Mare Morto.

=== Climate and vegetation ===
Pino's geographical location on the Cape's western coastline means it is subject to the prevailing westerly winds. The soil is covered with tall holm oak trres and dense scrubland that conceal the ancient cultivation terraces, developing on a soil composed partly of silky, wrinkled sericite schists, and partly of very resistant ophiolites composed of volcanic rocks, causing sharp, abrupt reliefs in the ground. Many roads are cut into the rock, and feature prasinites on the walls, tinted green by epidote minerals.

The Santa Lucia Chapel is surrounded by laricio pines. On the rocky coastal slopes, are the numerous agave and prickly pear trees that originated in Mexico and have become widespread around the Mediterranean.

== Population ==
Historical population

| Year | Pop. | ±% p.a. |
|---|---|---|
| 1800 | 507 | — |
| 1821 | 405 | −1.06% |
| 1846 | 426 | +0.20% |
| 1872 | 512 | +0.71% |
| 1901 | 575 | +0.40% |
| 1926 | 529 | −0.33% |
| 1946 | 331 | −2.32% |
| 1962 | 273 | −1.20% |
| 1968 | 269 | −0.25% |

| Year | Pop. | ±% p.a. |
|---|---|---|
| 1975 | 200 | −4.15% |
| 1982 | 137 | −5.26% |
| 1990 | 143 | +0.54% |
| 1999 | 150 | +0.53% |
| 2007 | 176 | +2.02% |
| 2012 | 148 | −3.41% |
| 2017 | 164 | +2.07% |
| 2023 | 148 | −1.70% |

Source: EHESS and INSEE (1968-2023)

== Etymology ==
Pino derives from the Latin word pinus, meaning umbrella pine, a species of tree endemic to the commune.

== See also ==
- Torra di Scalu
- Communes of the Haute-Corse department
