= Olcani =

- Commune
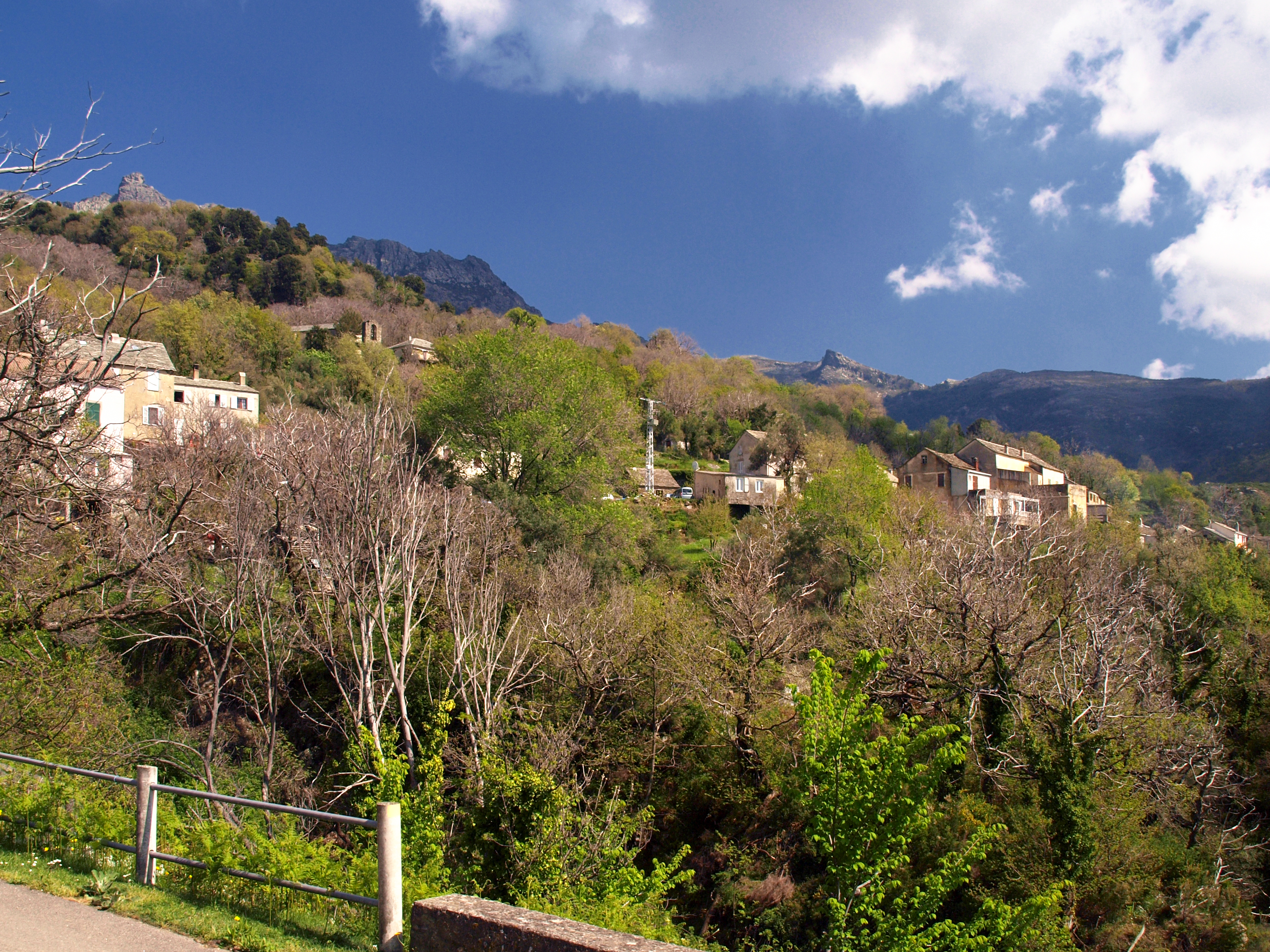
- Farraginni, part of Orcani
- Location of Olcani
- Location within France Location within Corsica
- Coordinates: 42°48′39″N 9°22′15″E
- Country: France
- Region: Corsica
- Department: Haute-Corse
- Arrondissement: Bastia
- Canton: Cap Corse
- Intercommunality: Cap Corse

Government
  - Mayor (2020–2026): Julia Labadie
- Area^{1}: 14.25 km^{2} (5.50 sq mi)
- Elevation: 350 m (1,150 ft)
- Highest elevation: 1,324 m (4,344 ft)
- Lowest elevation: 120 m (390 ft)
- Population (2023): 96
  - Density: 6.7/km^{2} (17/sq mi)
- Time zone: UTC+01:00 (CET)
  - Summer (DST): UTC+02:00 (CEST)
- INSEE/Postal code: 2B184 /20217
- ^{1} French Land Register data, which excludes lakes, ponds, glaciers > 1 km^{2} (0.386 sq mi or 247 acres) and river estuaries.

Olcani (French pronunciation: [ɔlkani]; Corsican: Olchini) is a commune in the Haute-Corse department of France on the island of Corsica.

== Population ==
Historical population
Year	Pop.	±% p.a.
1968	124	—
1975	96	−3.59%
1982	80	−2.57%
1990	65	−2.56%
1999	55	−1.84%
2007	58	+0.67%
2012	84	+7.69%
2017	82	−0.48%
2023	96	+2.66%
Source: INSEE

== See also ==
- Communes of the Haute-Corse department
