= Canton of Cap Corse =

Canton of France

Coordinates: 42.73°N 9.45°E

The Canton of Cap Corse (French: canton du Cap Corse, Corsican: cantone di u Capicorsu) is an administrative division of the French department of Haute-Corse, Corsica. It was created at the French canton reorganisation which came into effect in March 2015. Its seat is in San-Martino-di-Lota.

It consists of the following communes:

1. Barrettali
2. Brando
3. Cagnano
4. Canari
5. Centuri
6. Ersa
7. Farinole
8. Luri
9. Meria
10. Morsiglia
11. Nonza
12. Ogliastro
13. Olcani
14. Olmeta-di-Capocorso
15. Patrimonio
16. Pietracorbara
17. Pino
18. Rogliano
19. Sisco
20. San-Martino-di-Lota
21. Santa-Maria-di-Lota
22. Tomino
