= San-Martino-di-Lota =

- Commune
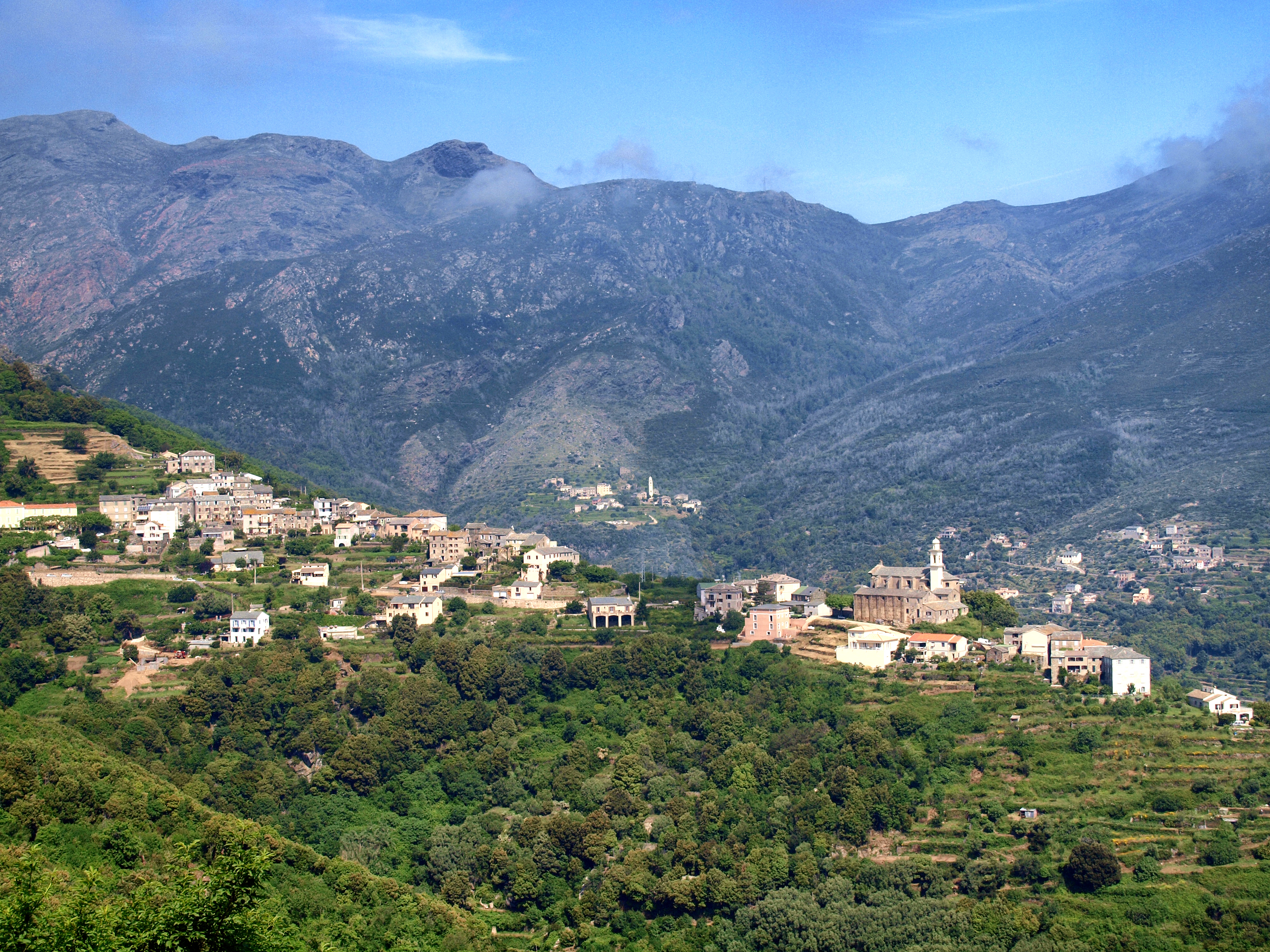
- The village of San-Martino-di-Lota

- Coat of arms
- Location of San-Martino-di-Lota
- Location within France Location within Corsica
- Coordinates: 42°43′26″N 9°27′21″E
- Country: France
- Region: Corsica
- Department: Haute-Corse
- Arrondissement: Bastia
- Canton: Cap Corse
- Intercommunality: CA Bastia

Government
  - Mayor (2020–2026): Marie-Hélène Padovani
- Area^{1}: 9.54 km^{2} (3.68 sq mi)
- Elevation: 260 m (850 ft)
- Highest elevation: 984 m (3,228 ft)
- Lowest elevation: 0 m (0 ft)
- Population (2023): 3,056
  - Density: 320/km^{2} (830/sq mi)
- Time zone: UTC+01:00 (CET)
  - Summer (DST): UTC+02:00 (CEST)
- INSEE/Postal code: 2B305 /20200
- ^{1} French Land Register data, which excludes lakes, ponds, glaciers > 1 km^{2} (0.386 sq mi or 247 acres) and river estuaries.

San-Martino-di-Lota (French form) or San Martino di Lota (Italian form; Corsican: San Martinu di Lota), is a commune in the French department of Haute-Corse, collectivity and island of Corsica.

== Population ==
Historical population
Year	Pop.	±% p.a.
1968	1,649	—
1975	2,132	+3.74%
1982	2,183	+0.34%
1990	2,466	+1.54%
1999	2,530	+0.29%
2007	2,726	+0.94%
2012	2,882	+1.12%
2017	2,901	+0.13%
2023	3,056	+0.87%
Source: INSEE

== See also ==
- Communes of the Haute-Corse department
- Tour de Miomo
