= Santa-Maria-di-Lota =

- Commune
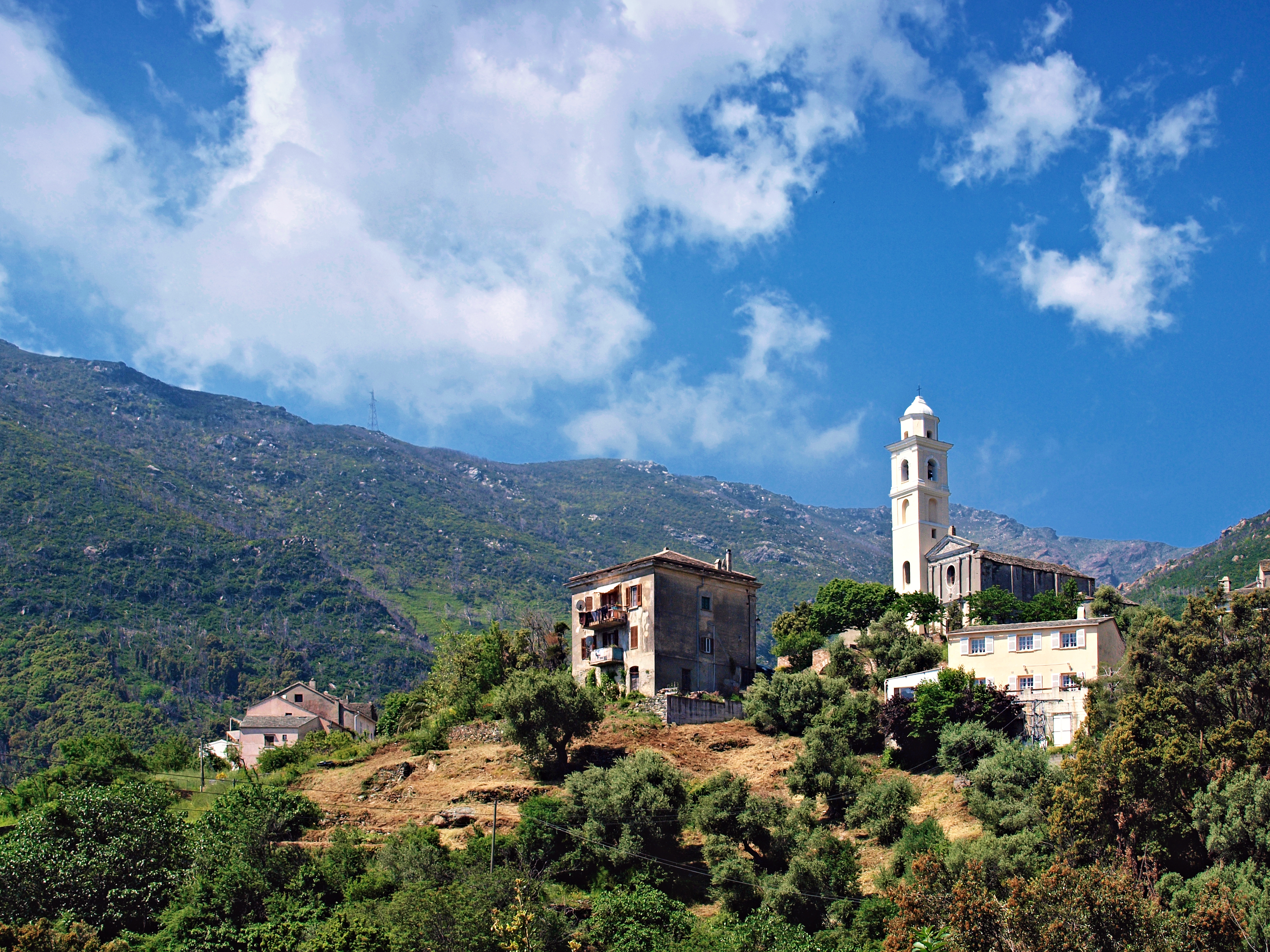
- The Church of Santa-Maria Assunta and the Santa-Croce Brotherhood Chapel, in the village of Mandriale in Santa-Maria-di-Lota
- Location of Santa-Maria-di-Lota
- Location within France Location within Corsica
- Coordinates: 42°44′52″N 9°26′01″E
- Country: France
- Region: Corsica
- Department: Haute-Corse
- Arrondissement: Bastia
- Canton: Cap Corse
- Intercommunality: CA Bastia

Government
  - Mayor (2020–2026): Guy Armanet
- Area^{1}: 13.20 km^{2} (5.10 sq mi)
- Elevation: 300 m (980 ft)
- Highest elevation: 1,198 m (3,930 ft)
- Lowest elevation: 0 m (0 ft)
- Population (2023): 1,973
  - Density: 149.5/km^{2} (387.1/sq mi)
- Demonym: Miumesi
- Time zone: UTC+01:00 (CET)
  - Summer (DST): UTC+02:00 (CEST)
- INSEE/Postal code: 2B309 /20200
- ^{1} French Land Register data, which excludes lakes, ponds, glaciers > 1 km^{2} (0.386 sq mi or 247 acres) and river estuaries.

Santa-Maria-di-Lota or Santa Maria di Lota is a commune in the Haute-Corse department of France on the island of Corsica.

== Demographics ==
=== Population ===
Historical population
Year	Pop.	±% p.a.
1968	987	—
1975	1,583	+6.98%
1982	1,566	−0.15%
1990	1,826	+1.94%
1999	1,791	−0.21%
2007	1,938	+0.99%
2012	2,005	+0.68%
2017	1,722	−3.00%
2023	1,973	+2.29%
Source: INSEE

=== Religion ===
The principal religion practiced is Catholicism.

== History ==
Santa-Maria-di-Lota was once called Santa Maria del Mandriale.

== Politics ==
Guy Armanet has been mayor of the town since 2008. Before him, Henri Sisco, of the Radical Party of the Left, served as mayor from 1978 to 2008.

== See also ==
- Communes of the Haute-Corse department
