= Cap Corse =

Peninsula at the northern tip of Corsica

- Communauté de communes
- Location within the geographical area
- Coordinates: 42°50′N 9°25′E
- Country: France
- Region: Corsica
- Department: Haute-Corse
- No. of communes: {{{nbcomm}}}
- Established: 2014
- Area: 305.7 km^{2} (118.0 sq mi)
- Population (2018): 6,706
  - Density: 21.94/km^{2} (56.82/sq mi)
- Website: www.comcomabc.fr

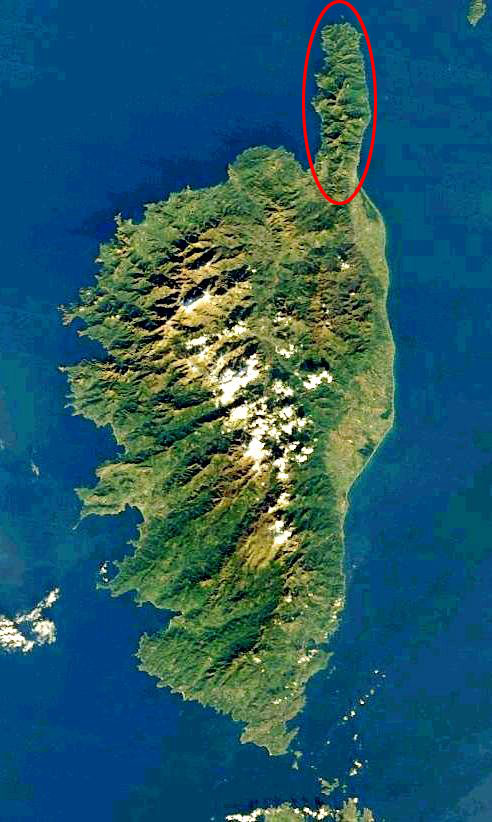
Cap Corse is the peninsula at the north of the island.

Cap Corse (French pronunciation: [kap kɔʁs]; Corsican: Capicorsu, [kapiˈkɔrsu]; Italian: Capo Corso, [ˈkaːpo ˈkɔrso]; lit. 'Corsican Cape'), a geographical area of Corsica, is a 40 kilometres (25 mi) long peninsula located at the northern tip of the island. At the base of it is the second largest city in Corsica, Bastia. Cap Corse is also a communauté de communes comprising 18 communes. The area of the communauté de communes is 305.7 km^{2}, and its population was 6,706 in 2019. Cap Corse may also refer to a wine made in the region.

== The communes ==
Starting on the west side and working north around the peninsula the communes are:

- Olmeta-di-Capocorso
- Nonza
- Olcani
- Ogliastro
- Canari
- Barrettali

- Pino
- Morsiglia
- Centuri
- Ersa
- Rogliano
- Tomino

- Meria
- Luri
- Cagnano
- Pietracorbara
- Sisco
- Brando

The canton of Cap Corse is slightly larger, and also includes the communes Farinole, Patrimonio, San-Martino-di-Lota and Santa-Maria-di-Lota.

== History ==
Numerous historians have termed Cap Corse "the Sacred Promontory" and have gone so far as to suppose the name came from a high concentration of early Christian settlements. This is a folk etymology.

The term comes from the geographer Ptolemy, who called his first and northernmost location on Corsica the hieron akron in ancient Greek, translated by the Romans as sacrum promontorium. This is not the only point of land to be so called; there were many others in the classical world, none of them Christian. The meaning is somewhat ambiguous, whether it was called that because of a temple placed there or whether as the end of the land it was sacred to the god of the sea. If the date of the Geography is taken arbitrarily to be 100 AD, and Ptolemy was working from earlier sources, a Christian association is highly unlikely. There is no evidence either that Corsica was converted earlier than the 6th century AD, or of any Christian communities in the area in Ptolemy's time, and the concentration of later Christian edifices is no greater than they are in any populated region of Corsica.

Ptolemy's interpretation of promontory also is not clear. It has been taken to mean the entire Cap Corse, the Pointe du Cap Corse, or some one of the small promontories on it. Sometimes it is associated with Macinaggio, but the problem remains unsolved.

There is some geographic justification for associating Ptolemy's entire tribe, the Vanacini, who are described as "more to the north", with Cap Corse, as it is a distinct geophysical environment. The Vanacini appear in a bronze tablet found in northern Corsica repeating a letter from the emperor Vespasian to "the magistrates and senators of the Vanacini" written about 72 AD, in Ptolemy's time. The Vanacini had bought some land from Colonia Mariana, a Roman colony in the vicinity of Bastia, and complained about the borders fixed by the procurator from whom they had bought it. The emperor, on receiving the complaint, appointed another procurator to arbitrate and wrote informing the complainants. The inscription is documentary evidence of the historicity of the Vanacini.

== The Apértif Wine ==
Cap Corse is also the name of an aromatized apéritif wine named for its point of origin on the northern Corsican peninsula. The wine was developed by Louis-Napoléon Mattei in 1872 and has been in production ever since. Similar to vermouth, Mattei Cap Corse is produced in blanc and rouge versions and may be used as an ingredient in cocktails. Its distinctive flavor comes from the Vermentino and Muscat Blanc à Petits Grains grapes infused with Cap Corse area botanicals, including cedrat, a citrus fruit specific to Corsica, and the bark of the Cinchona tree. Anthony Powell mentions Cap Corse in his novel The Military Philosophers as a popular drink with the Free French forces in London during World War II when French wines were scarce.

== See also ==
- Macinaggio (village)
