= Canton of Borgo =

Coordinates: 42.56°N 9.44°E

The canton of Borgo is an administrative division of the Haute-Corse department, southeastern France. Its borders were modified at the French canton reorganisation which came into effect in March 2015. Its seat is in Borgo.

It consists of the following communes:

1. Borgo
2. Lucciana
3. Vignale

== Municipalities ==
The canton consists of three municipalities with a total population of 17,456 (as of January 1, 2023) and a total area of 77.63 km².

Prior to the 2015 nationwide reorganization of the cantons, the canton of Borgo comprised four municipalities: Biguglia, Borgo, Lucciana, and Vignale. It covered an area of 99.90 km². Before 2015, it held a different INSEE code than it does today—specifically, 2B08.
