= Graines de star =

French television talent show

Graines de star (transl. Stardust) is a French television talent show created by Thierry Ardisson, presented by Laurent Boyer.

Highlighting emerging talent, this variety show was broadcast on the French TV channel M6 on between 1996 and 2004.

Notable performers who appeared on the show have included Anastacia, Alizée and Willy Denzey.

Graines de stars is a talent show that aimed to discover young talents. At its launch, the competition consisted of five categories: "Graines de Top," "Graines d’animateur," "Graines de comique," "Graines d’imitateur," and "Graines de chanteur."

According to the initial entertainment format, three candidates compete in each category. All the young people are sponsored by a star (Greg Hansen for the "Tops" in the first episode). As they take the stage, the guests reflect on their beginnings, sharing anecdotes and archival footage.

Over time, new categories have been created such as « Graines de danseur » (dancer) (at the request of the public) and "Graines de comédiens » (comedian).

== Candidates ==
The following personalities have appeared on this show several times:

- Poetic Lover (11 times, those who appeared the most)
- Jérôme Commandeur (8 times)
- Jean Dujardin, Ève Angeli, Alizée, Leslie (7 times)
- Bruno Salomone (6 times)
- Sandy Valentino (5 times)

The following personalities have appeared at least once on this show (non-exhaustive list):

- Éric Collado
- Pierre-Yves Noël
- Frédérica Sorel
- Nâdiya
- Nathan Lee
- Alexandra Lucci
- Lucie Bernardoni
- Willy Denzey
- Justine Lynn
- Sally bat des ailes
- Cécilia Cara
- Katia Markosy
- Alexia Melotto
- Tilly Key
- Christophe Maé
- Eva Chemouni
- Jenifer
- Grégory Lemarchal
- Kathy
- Emma Daumas
- Romain Cortese
- Melissa M
- Laura
- Sarah Lou
- Cylia
- Lise Darly
- Bintou Dembélé
- Gilles Souteyrand
- Maxime
- Danny Mauro
- Erick Baert
- Michaël Gregorio
- Myriam Abel
- Stefan Mills
- Priscilla Betti
- Denis Maréchal
- Sabrina Lonis.
