= Église Sainte-Croix =

Église Sainte-Croix may refer to:

- Church of the Holy Cross, Bordeaux, Gironde, France
- Église Sainte-Croix, Kaysersberg, Haut-Rhin, France
- Église Sainte-Croix de Bastia, Haute-Corse, Corsica, France
