= Saint-Jean-Baptiste, Bastia =

Church located in Bastia (Haute-Corse, France)

Coordinates: 42°41′49″N 9°27′01″E

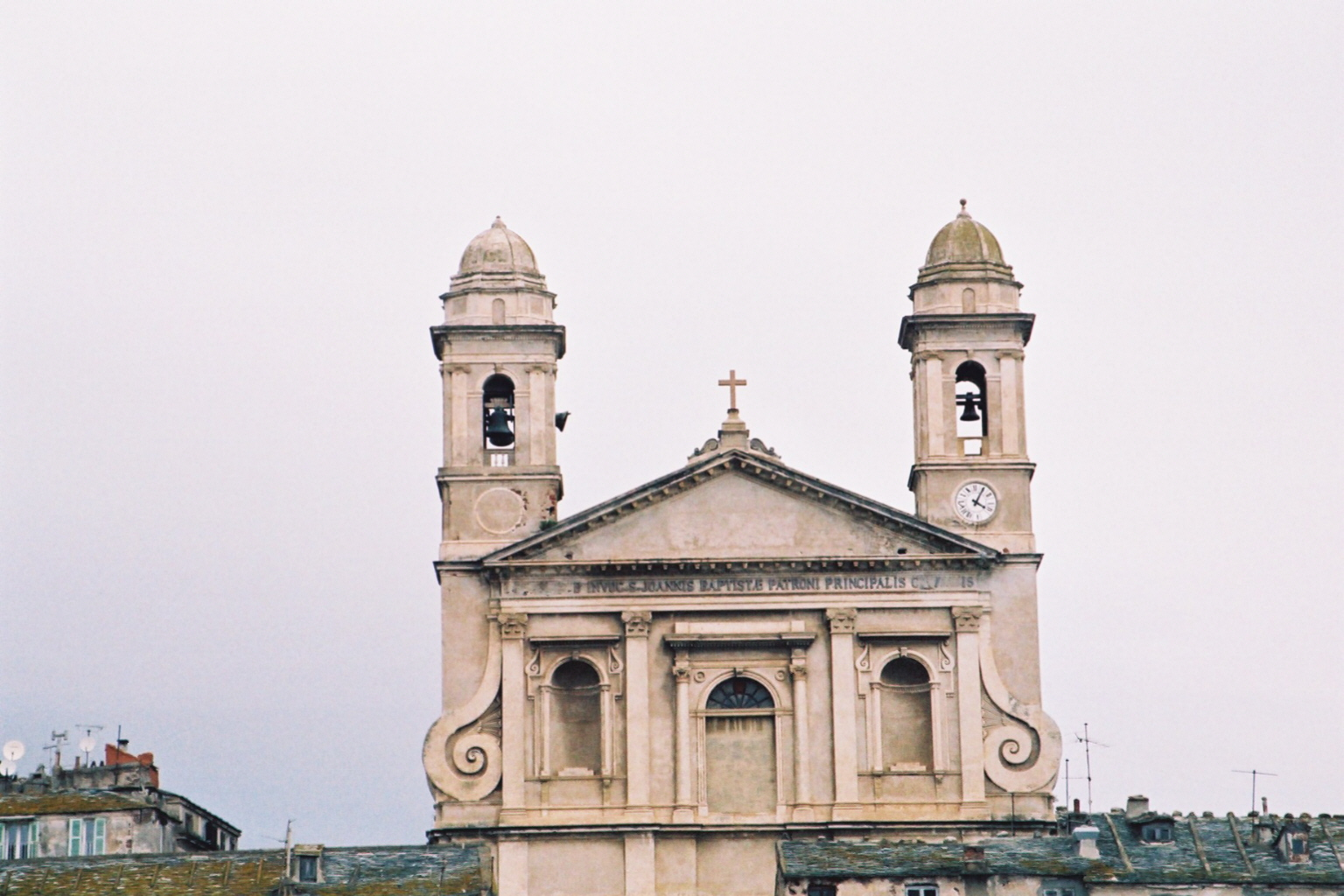
Église Saint-Jean-Baptiste de Bastia

Saint-Jean-Baptiste de Bastia (Corsican: San Ghjuvanni Battista di Bastìa; English: St. John Baptist of Bastia) is a church in Bastia, Haute-Corse, Corsica. The building was classified as a Historic Monument in 2000.

St Jean is the largest church in Bastia but is not the cathedral of Bastia. The cathedral of Bastia is St Marie.
