= Cantons of the Haute-Corse department =

The following is a list of the 15 cantons of the Haute-Corse department, in France, following the French canton reorganisation which came into effect in March 2015:

- Bastia-1
- Bastia-2
- Bastia-3
- Bastia-4
- Biguglia-Nebbio
- Borgo
- Calvi
- Cap Corse
- Casinca-Fumalto
- Castagniccia
- Corte
- Fiumorbo-Castello
- Ghisonaccia
- Golo-Morosaglia
- L'Île-Rousse
