= Hôtel de Ville, Bastia =

Town hall in Bastia, France

Hôtel de Ville
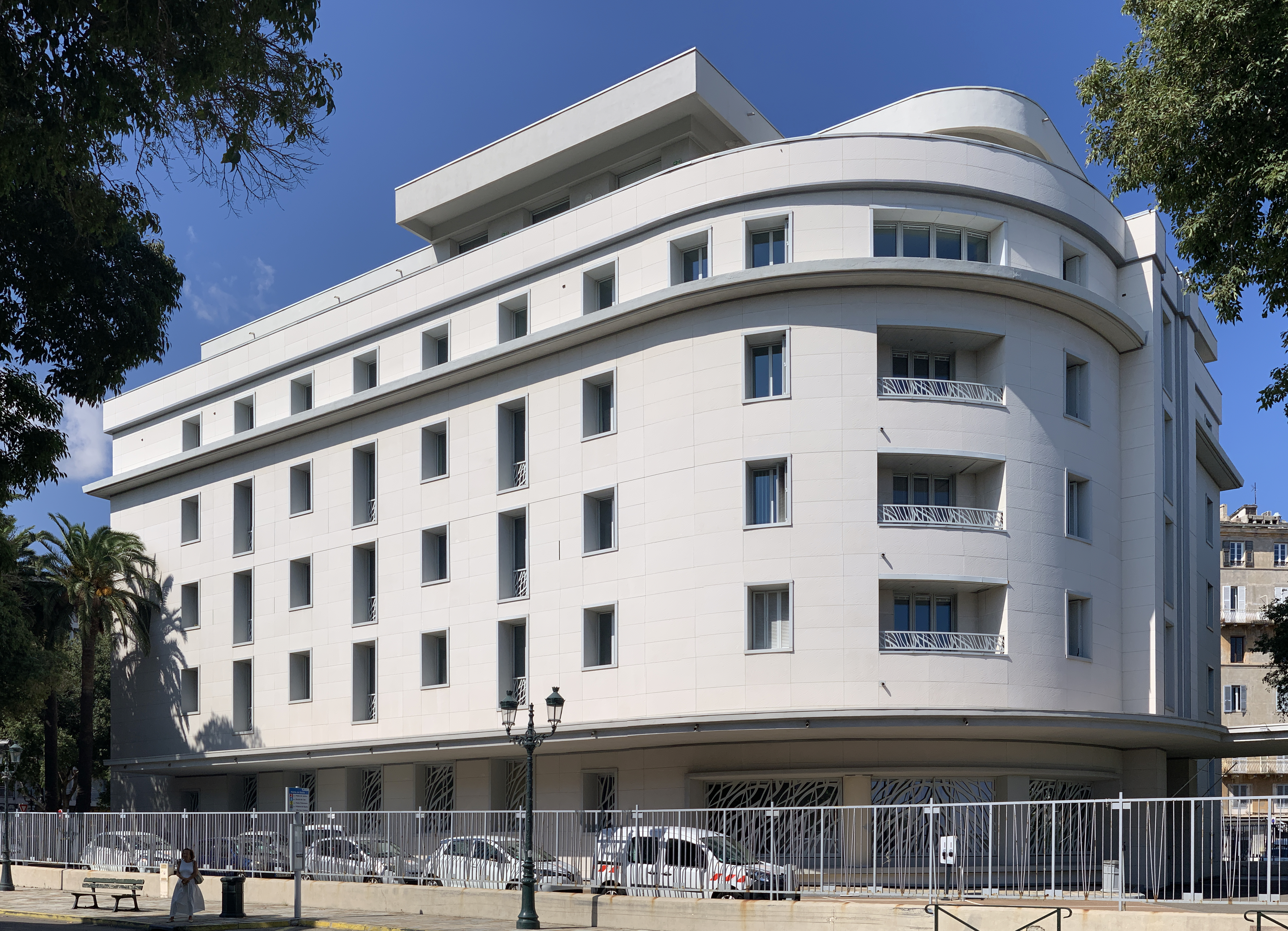
- The main frontage of the Hôtel de Ville in September 2021
- Interactive map of the Hôtel de Ville area

General information
- Type: City hall
- Architectural style: Modern style
- Location: Bastia, France
- Coordinates: 42.7023°N 9.4519°E
- Completed: c.1965

The Hôtel de Ville (French pronunciation: [otɛl də vil], City Hall) is a municipal building in Bastia, Haute-Corse, in northeastern Corsica, standing on Place Saint-Nicolas.

== History ==
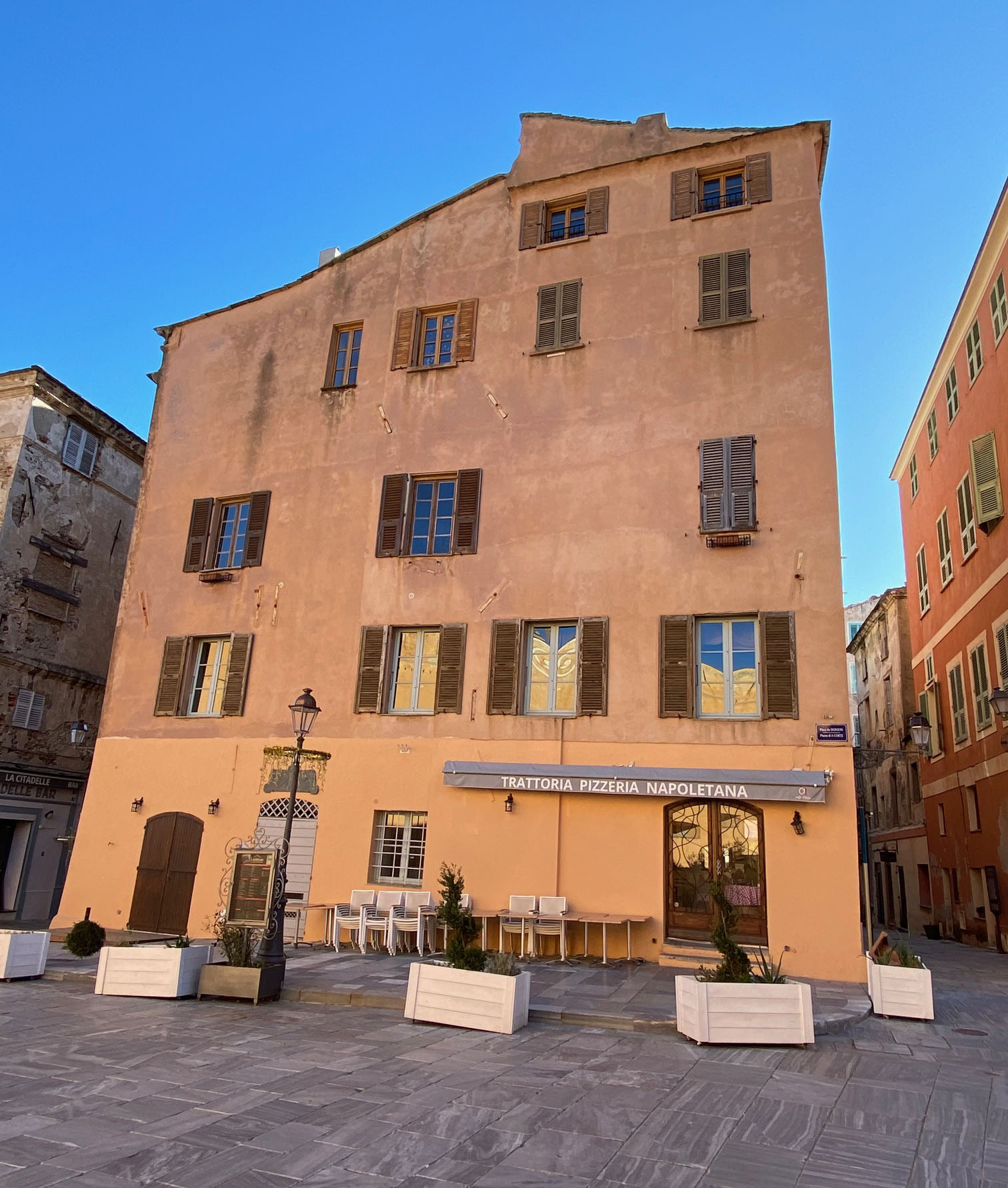
The Casetta

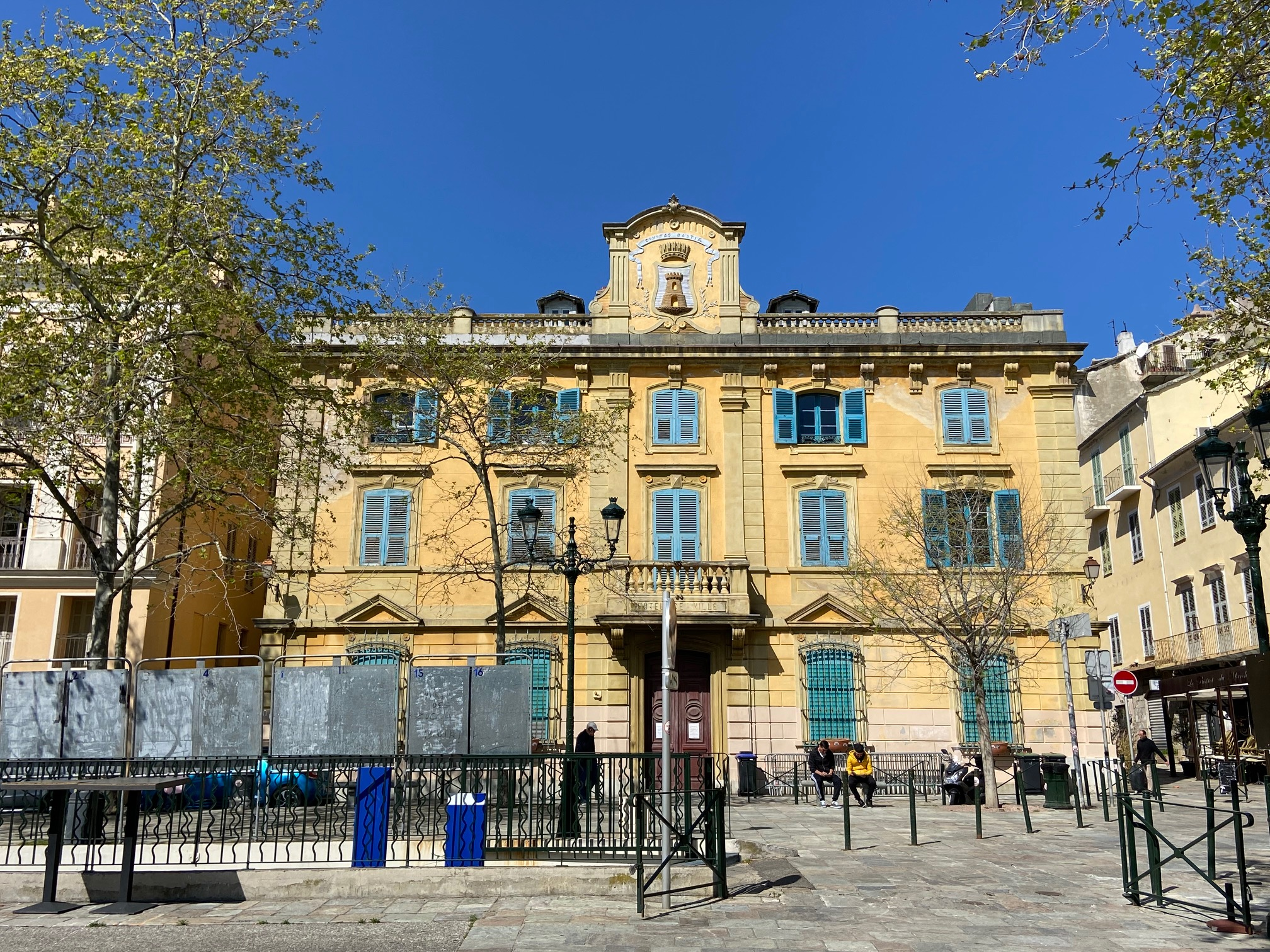
The old town hall

The first municipal building in Bastia was the Casetta in the Place du Donjon, which dated from the 15th century. The podestà and other local officials who met there continued to have influence after the French conquest of Corsica in 1768.

Following the French Revolution, there was an elected town council. In 1811, the council relocated to the convent of the Lazarists and, a few years later, it moved to the convent of the Jesuits. It then transferred to Maison Vidau on Rue du Chanoine Letteron in 1838 and, finally, to Pavillon Favalleli on Rue Favalleli in 1854. In the mid-19th century, the council decided to commission a permanent meeting place. The site they selected was an old barracks on the Place du Marché (the old market place) in the Merria Vechja (the old town).

Although the council entered discussions with the French Army to acquire the site in 1855, the initial plans for the new building were unaffordable and it was two decades before the project got underway. The new building was designed by Andrea Scala in the neoclassical style, built by Pascal Firbi in ashlar stone and was officially opened in time for a council meeting held on 17 May 1877. The design involved a symmetrical main frontage of five bays facing onto the market place. The central bay featured a doorway with a moulded surround flanked by brackets supporting a balcony. There was a French door on the first floor and a segmental headed window with shutters on the second floor. The central bay was flanked by Doric order pilasters which spanned the first and second floors and supported a cornice and a panel bearing the coat of arms of the town. The outer bays were fenestrated in a similar style and surmounted by a balustraded parapet. Internally, the principal room was the Salle des Mariages (wedding room) which continues to be used for weddings and civil ceremonies.

On 9 September 1943, during the Second World War, the resistance leaders, Raoul Begnini and Etienne Léo Micheli, seized the town hall. German troops regained control later in the day but the town was eventually liberated on 4 October 1943.

In the 1970s, following a significant increase in the population, the council decided to acquire a more substantial town hall. The site they selected was on the north side of Place Saint-Nicolas. This site had been occupied by the Hôtel Cyrnos, which was designed by Simon-François Fratacci in the Art Nouveau style and completed in 1911. The Hôtel Cyrnos was destroyed by American bombing in October 1943 during the Second World War. After the war, a new building, the Hôtel Impérial, was commissioned for the site. It was designed by Gaston Castel in the modern style, faced in white concrete panels and completed in around 1965. The design involved a prominent curved façade, which incorporated the main entrance on the corner of Avenue Pierre Giudicelli and Rue Adolphe Landry. The upper floors, which featured fine balconies above the entrance, were jettied out over the pavement. The building was acquired by the French Government in 1970 and, after being raised by an extra floor, it served as the sub-prefecture for Bastia and then as the main prefecture building for Haute-Corse. After the prefecture relocated to Rond point Maréchal Leclerc de Hautecloque, the building was made available to the town council for municipal use in 1982.

A monument sculpted by Noël Bonardi, intended to commemorate the lives of local members of the French Resistance who died during the Second World War, was unveiled to the east of the town hall in 1990.
