= Gérard Mannoni =

French sculptor (1928–2020)

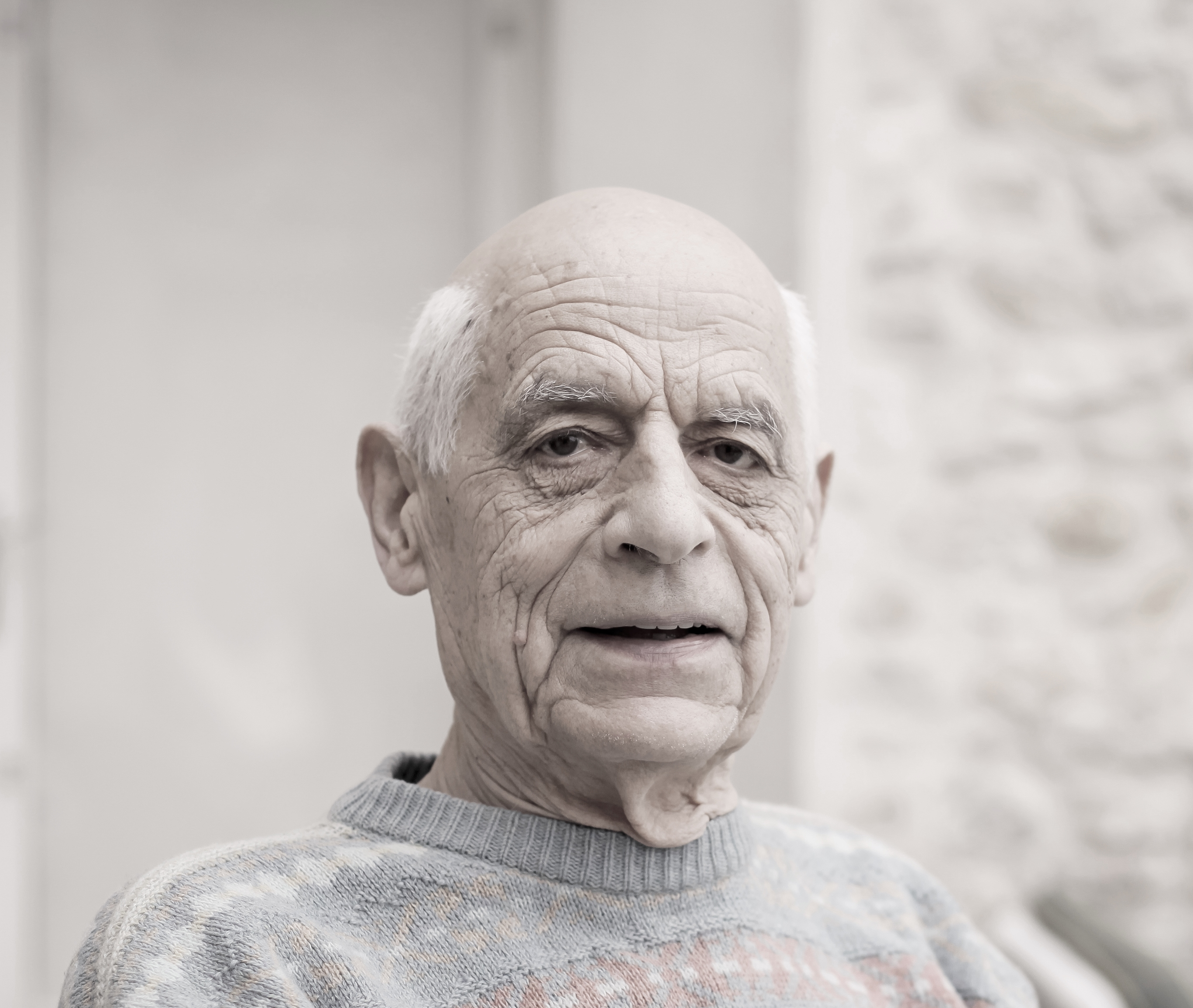
- Gérard Mannoni
- Born: 1 January 1928; Bastia, France
- Died: 1 April 2020 (aged 92); Viry-Châtillon, France
- Occupation: Sculptor

Gérard Mannoni (1 January 1928 – 1 April 2020) was a French sculptor.

== Biography ==
Born in Bastia, Mannoni spent his childhood in Paris. He studied at the École des Métiers d'Art, the École nationale supérieure des beaux-arts, the Académie Julian, and the Académie de la Grande Chaumière. He worked in the workshops of Marcel Gimond, Hubert Yencesse, and Ossip Zadkine.

Mannoni made his first group exhibition at the Galerie Breteau in a group with André Bloc, Robert Jacobsen, Marino Di Teana, Claude Parent, and others.

Gérard Mannoni died on 1 April 2020 in Viry-Châtillon at the age of 92 due to COVID-19.

== Exhibitions ==
- Galerie Colette Allendy, Paris (1958)
- Biennale de Paris (1959)
- Venice Biennale (1970)
- "Sculpture française contemporaine", Australia, New Zealand, Mexico (1973)
- Metal sculptures at the town hall of La Rochelle (1981)
- Fountain at Place Jacques Brel, Guyancourt (1985)
- Musée de la ville à Montigny-le-Bretonneux (2014)
