= Vincent Seatelli =

French footballer (born 1971)

Personal information
- Full name: Vincent Seatelli
- Date of birth: 26 November 1971 (age 54)
- Place of birth: Bastia, France
- Height: 1.80 m (5 ft 11 in)
- Position: Striker

Senior career*
Years	Team	Apps	(Gls)
1989–1995	FC Martigues	71	(4)
1995–1997	Olympique Alès	40	(6)
1997–1998	FC Rouen	17	(7)
1998	Greenock Morton	1	(0)
1998–1999	ES Fréjus	27	(4)
1999–2003	Gazélec Ajaccio	95	(9)
- * Club domestic league appearances and goals

Vincent Seatelli (born 26 November 1971) is a French former professional footballer who played as a striker. He made one appearance for Scottish club Greenock Morton during the 1997–98 season.
