= Canton of Bastia-3 =

Coordinates: 42.683°N 9.444°E

The Canton of Bastia-3 is one of the 15 cantons of the Haute-Corse department, France. Since the French canton reorganisation which came into effect in March 2015, the communes of the canton of Bastia-3 are:

- Bastia (partly)
