= Owen Simonin =

French YouTuber, Entrepreneur

- Born: 10 May 1997 (age 29); Bastia
- Other name: Hasheur

YouTube information
- Channel: Hasheur
- Years active: 2016–present
- Subscribers: 682 thousand
- Views: 32.2 million
- Last updated: September 2, 2024

Owen Simonin (born in May 1997 in Bastia), known as Hasheur, is a French entrepreneur, influencer, YouTuber and speaker specializing in blockchain and cryptocurrency technologies.

== Biography ==
=== Career ===
As an advocate of cryptocurrencies and blockchain, he created the educational YouTube channel, "Hasheur" in 2016. In May 2017, he founded the fintech Just Mining with his brother William Simonin, to make investing in cryptocurrency mining accessible and offer investment solutions (staking, masternodes). At the end of 2017, he released a video, "the scam of the century" to denounce BitConnect, a ponzi scheme that collapsed a few months later. In 2018, he criticizes the Minister of Economy, Bruno Lemaire in a video that calls out the factual errors made by the person concerned during an interview on bitcoin. His response is widely taken up and praised on the networks. In 2018, he co-founded Deskoin, a French cryptocurrency exchange platform, which in 2019 became a partner of the software publisher Global POS allowing more than 25,000 physical points of sale, to accept payment in cryptocurrencies. From 2017 to 2021, he communicates as during the TedX Rive de Moselle, and joins the projects Waltio (taxation of cryptomoins), Ngrave (hardware wallet), Cruxpool (mining pool), and Ternoa (blockchain). He also collaborates with Idriss Aberkane, Alexandre Dreyfus, Pierre Person, Romain Lanery, YohViral, and Amixem. Since 2021, he hosts the show "Les Pros de Crypto" at BFM Business and participates in charity events.
