= Canton of Bastia-1 =

Coordinates: 42.704°N 9.451°E

The Canton of Bastia-1 is one of the 15 cantons of the Haute-Corse department, France. Since the French canton reorganisation which came into effect in March 2015, the communes of the canton of Bastia-1 are:

- Bastia (partly)
- Ville-di-Pietrabugno
