= Bastia =

Bastia Bastìa (Corsican)
- Prefecture and commune
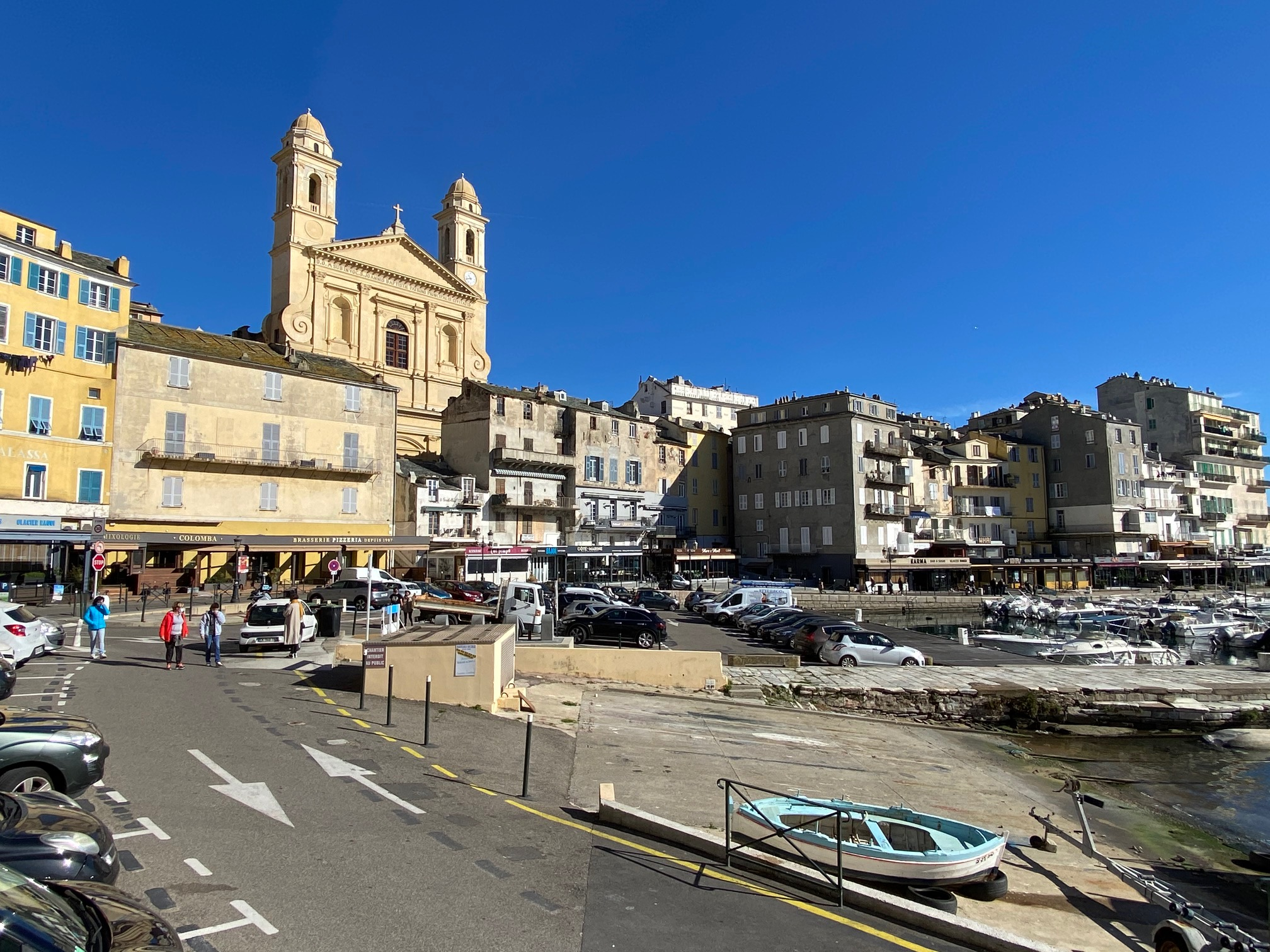
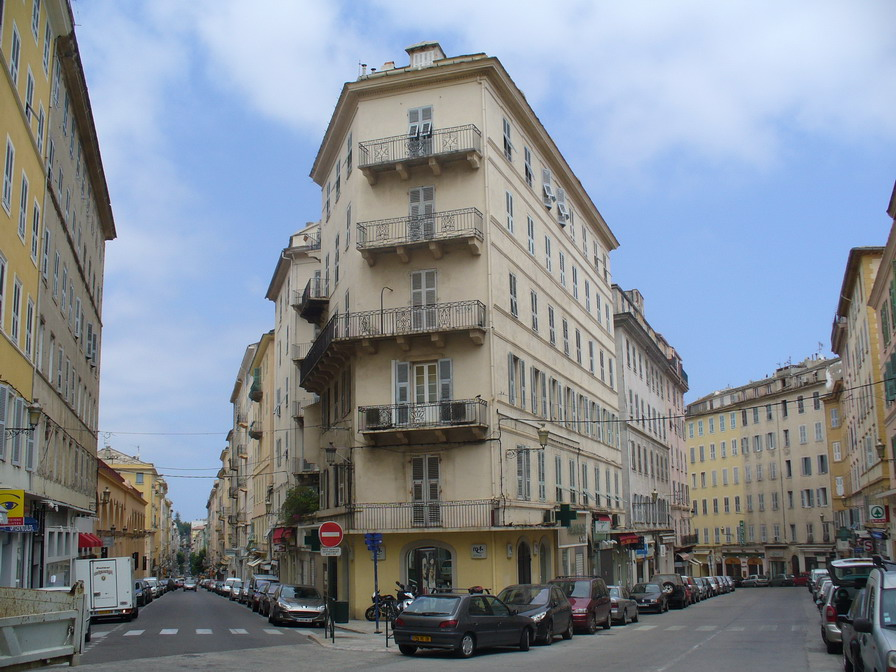
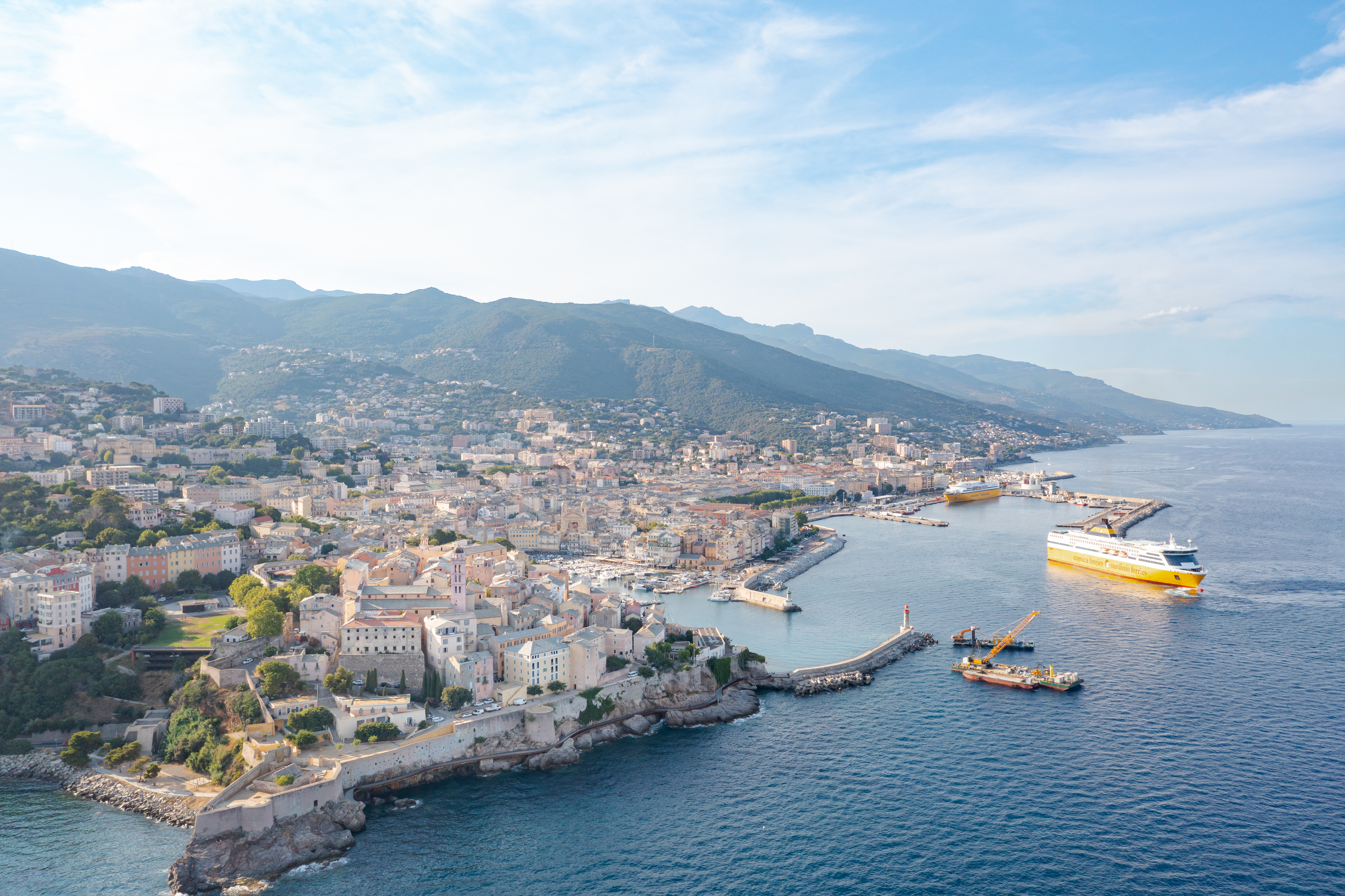
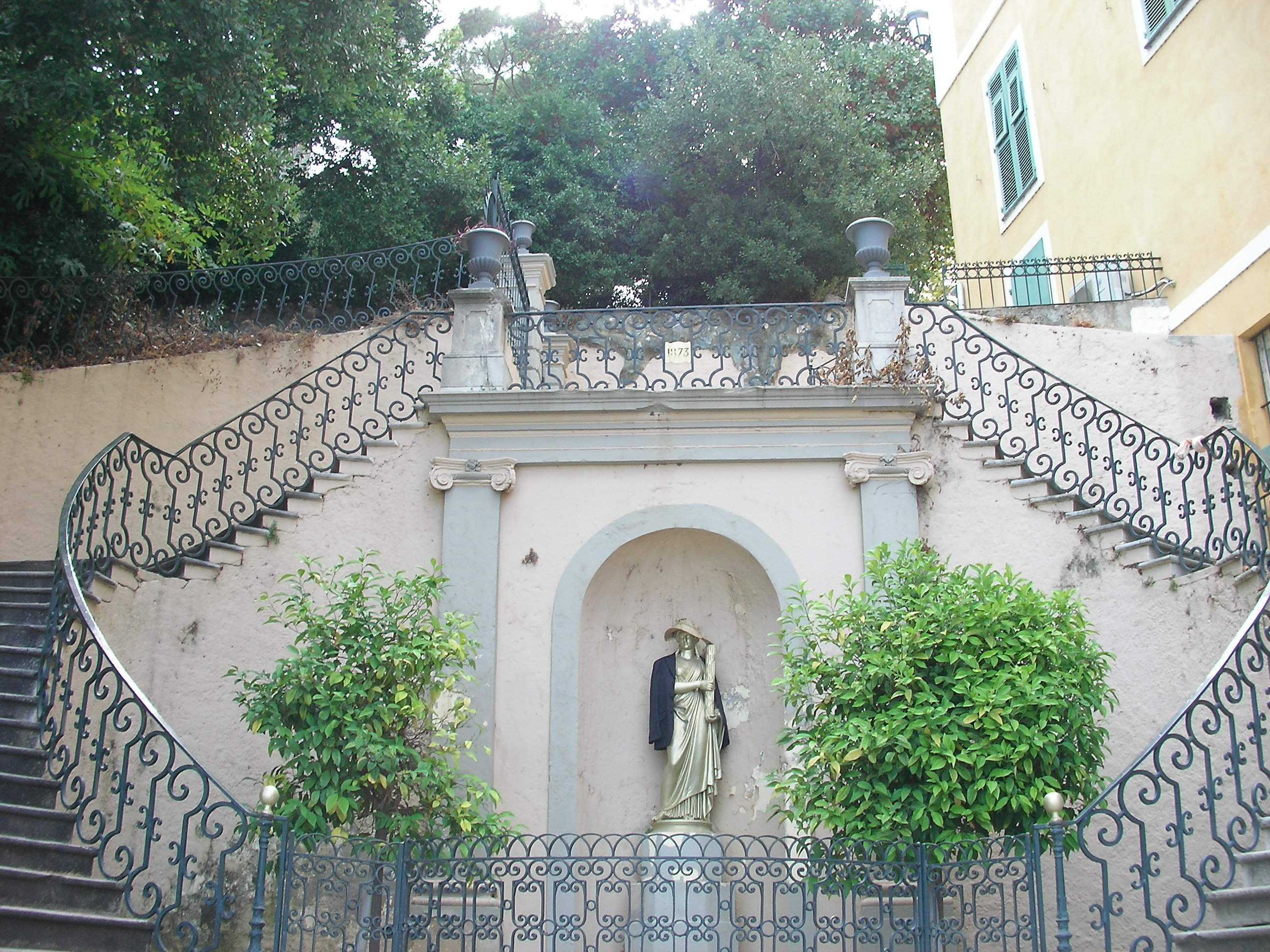
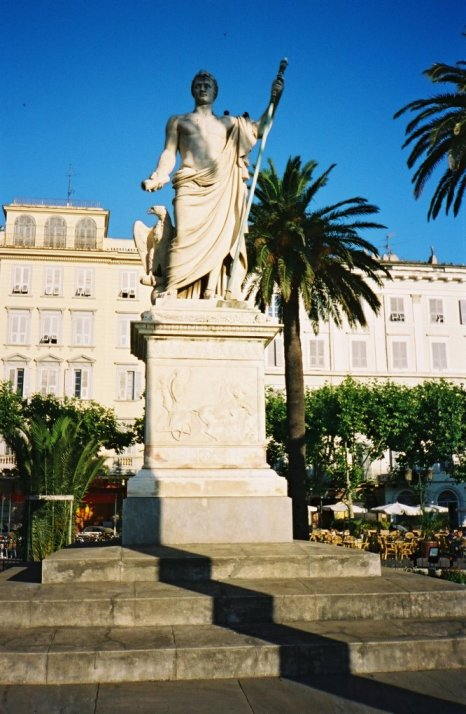
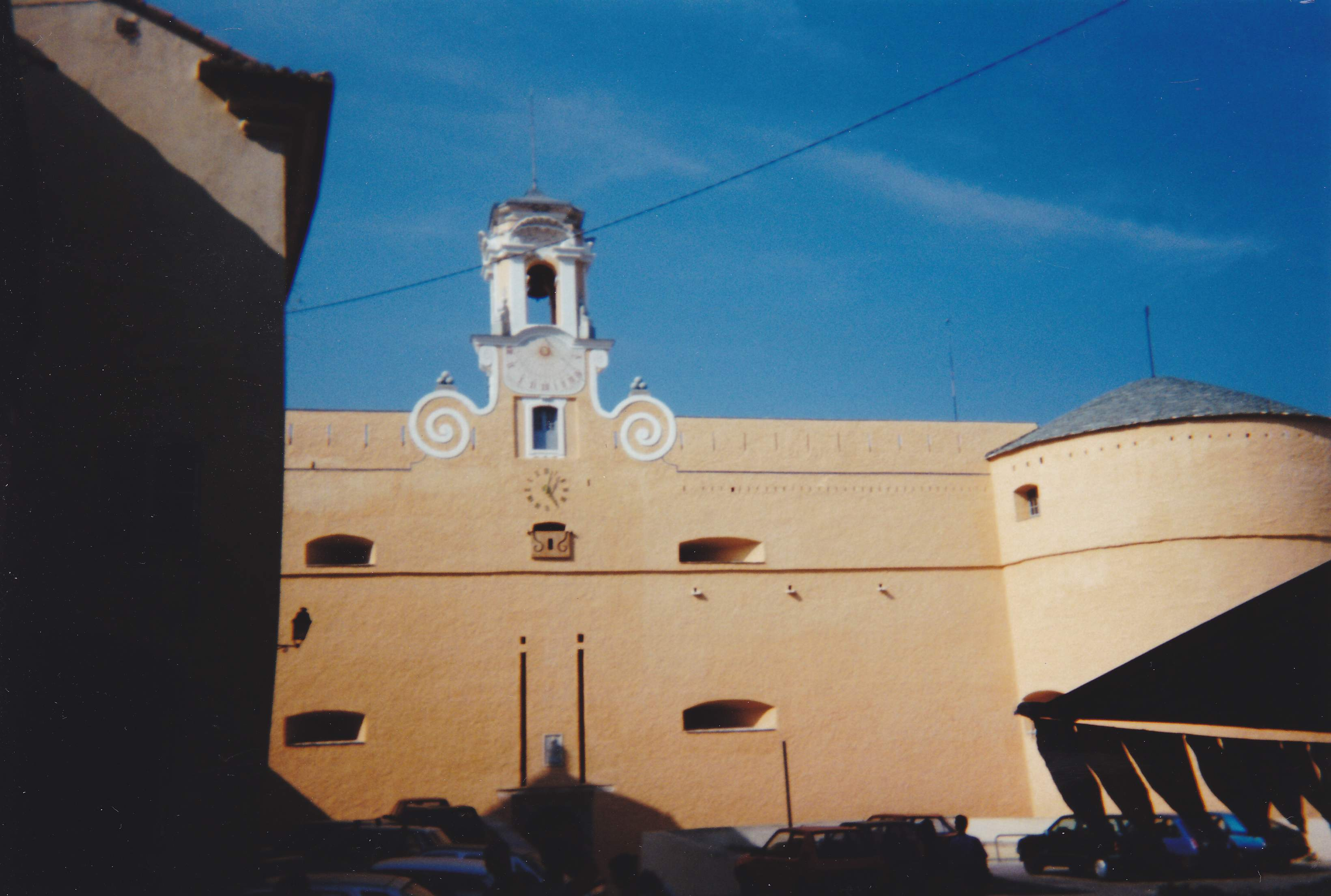
- From top, left to right: View of St Jean Baptiste Cathedral from the city's port, Boulevard Paoli, aerial view of the port and Bastia's citadel to the left, Romieu Stairs in Romieu Garden, Place Saint-Nicolas with Napoleon Bonaparte statue, Governor's Palace.

- Flag Coat of arms
- Location of Bastia
- Location within France Location within Corsica
- Coordinates: 42°42′03″N 9°27′01″E
- Country: France
- Region: Corsica
- Department: Haute-Corse
- Arrondissement: Bastia
- Canton: Bastia-1, 2, 3 and 4
- Intercommunality: CA Bastia

Government
  - Mayor (2026–32): Gilles Simeoni (FC)
- Area^{1}: 19.38 km^{2} (7.48 sq mi)
- Elevation: 30 m (98 ft)
- Highest elevation: 963 m (3,159 ft)
- Lowest elevation: 0 m (0 ft)
- Population (2023): 46,867
  - Density: 2,418/km^{2} (6,263/sq mi)
- Demonym(s): Bastiais, Bastiaise (FR) bastìacciu, bastìaccia (CO), bastiese (IT)
- Time zone: UTC+01:00 (CET)
  - Summer (DST): UTC+02:00 (CEST)
- INSEE/Postal code: 2B033 /20200
- ^{1} French Land Register data, which excludes lakes, ponds, glaciers > 1 km^{2} (0.386 sq mi or 247 acres) and river estuaries.

Bastia (UK: /ˈbæstjə, ˈbɑːs-/ BA(H)SS-tyə, US: /ˈbɑːstiə, ˈbæs-, bɑːˈstiːə/ BA(H)SS-tee-ə, bahss-TEE-; French: [bastja], Italian: [baˈstiːa]; Corsican: Bastìa [baˈsti.a]) is a commune in the department of Haute-Corse, Corsica, France. It is in the northeast of the island of Corsica at the base of Cap Corse. It also has the second-highest population of any commune on the island after Ajaccio and is the capital of the Bagnaja region and of the department.

Bastia is the principal port of the island and its principal commercial town and is known for its wines. The inhabitants of the commune are known as Bastiais or Bastiaises. The commune has been awarded three flowers by the National Council of Towns and Villages in Bloom in the Competition of cities and villages in Bloom.

== History ==
=== Ancient times ===
During the Roman Empire, the site of Cardo with the north-eastern district of the current commune of Bastia and Pietrabugno formed a Pieve: the oldest known administrative division. This territory was occupied by the Vanacimi people. Bastia did not exist. Neither Ptolemy, Strabo, or Pliny in the descriptions they made of the island mentioned Bastia.

=== Middle Ages ===
At the end of the 9th century, the territory or pieve of Mantino depended on the lords Loretesi. (Note: Alberto de Loreto was one of the companions of Oberto I, a descendant of Boniface, Marquis of Tuscany, in his military expedition to conquer the north-east of Corsica) They were driven out in 1072 by the Da Furiani, Aschesi or Laschesi, aided by the Marquis of Massa.

In 1370, the Republic of Genoa sent two governors to Corsica: Leonello Lomellino and Aluigi Toriorino. Shortly afterwards, considering the great expense and little profit in Corsica, the Republic decided to withdraw and no longer intervene in the affairs of the island. Nevertheless some Genoese gentlemen formed a partnership known as the Maona to try and manage the economy on the island on behalf of the Republic of Genoa. The five partners were: Leonello Lomellino, Giovanni da Balagnera, Aluigi Tortorino, Andreolo Ficone, and Cristoforo Maruffo. They all came with the title of Governor and brought with them a thousand soldiers.

After an expedition to Cinarca followed by a short period of peace, Leonello Lomellino returned as governor and to gain an advantage over the Count Arrigo della Rocca with whom he would have to fight, he began by fortifying Aléria. "Then Count Arrigo and his allies once again crossed the mountains and made incursions against Cap Corse: having met no resistance, they went to besiege Aléria which capitulated after four months. Leonello, deprived of all support, returned to Biguglia and from there he went to build the castle of Bastia to maintain his sea communications". (Note: In a footnote (p. 233) to History of Corsica – Vol. I, Abbot Letteron wrote: "The foundation of Bastia is generally fixed on the year 1378 but The Bastia was not built until a few years later as there were several wars between that event and the institution of the Maona" (in French))

"Between the second half of the 12th century and the middle of the 13th century the feudal system was in place at all levels of society and new links were created between the elite of the aristocracy and the Maritime republics, between representatives of the island's nobility, and between them and the poor. At the same time castles multiplied. They were then owned by fifteen noble families of local or peninsular origin, sometimes fragmented into independent lordships or even [sic] rivals: Bagnaia, Amondaschi, Cortinchi, Pinaschi de Coasini, Lotreto de Nebbio, Loreto de Casinca, Orezza, Avogari, Camilla, Turca, Pevere, de Mari (from the mid-13th century only), and the Marquis de Massa and Corsica".

– Daniel Istria – Powers and fortifications in northern Corsica 11th – 14th Century, p. 145

According to Giovanni della Grossa, the "seigneurialisation" of Loreto would have been, as with Genoese families of the Cape, usurping the County title acquired during the "people's government". Small lordships that emerged from the courts of the Bishop of Nebbio, probably sometime in the second half of the 12th century or the beginning of the 13th century, were partly absorbed by the lords of Bagnaia before 1247. Then, before 1289, they were recovered and absorbed, like many others in the new lordship of Giovanninello de Loreto. Taking advantage of the Genoese-pisano rivalries, he extended his possessions to the east and west.

Written documentation illustrates the business of territorial conquest conducted by Giovanninello during the years 1260–1280. After raiding the castles of Nebbio and Pureto in the Ostriconi, he went on to the conquest of the pieve of Orto, which was then under the control of Bagnaia, and he built two new fortifications: Montebello and Petra di Bugno. These were intended not only to dominate and control the northern part of Bagnaia, whose Cerlino Lake had a certain economic interest, but probably also to neutralise Porto Cardo, which occupied a strategic military position as well as having businesses. It was here that the fortress of Bastia was erected, the residence of the Genoese governors from the 15th century. The agreements between Giovanninello and the commune of Genoa in 1289 demonstrated the importance of this baronial control of land routes and anchorages, a major source of revenue and a guarantee of the security of the territory.

=== Originally Cardo ===
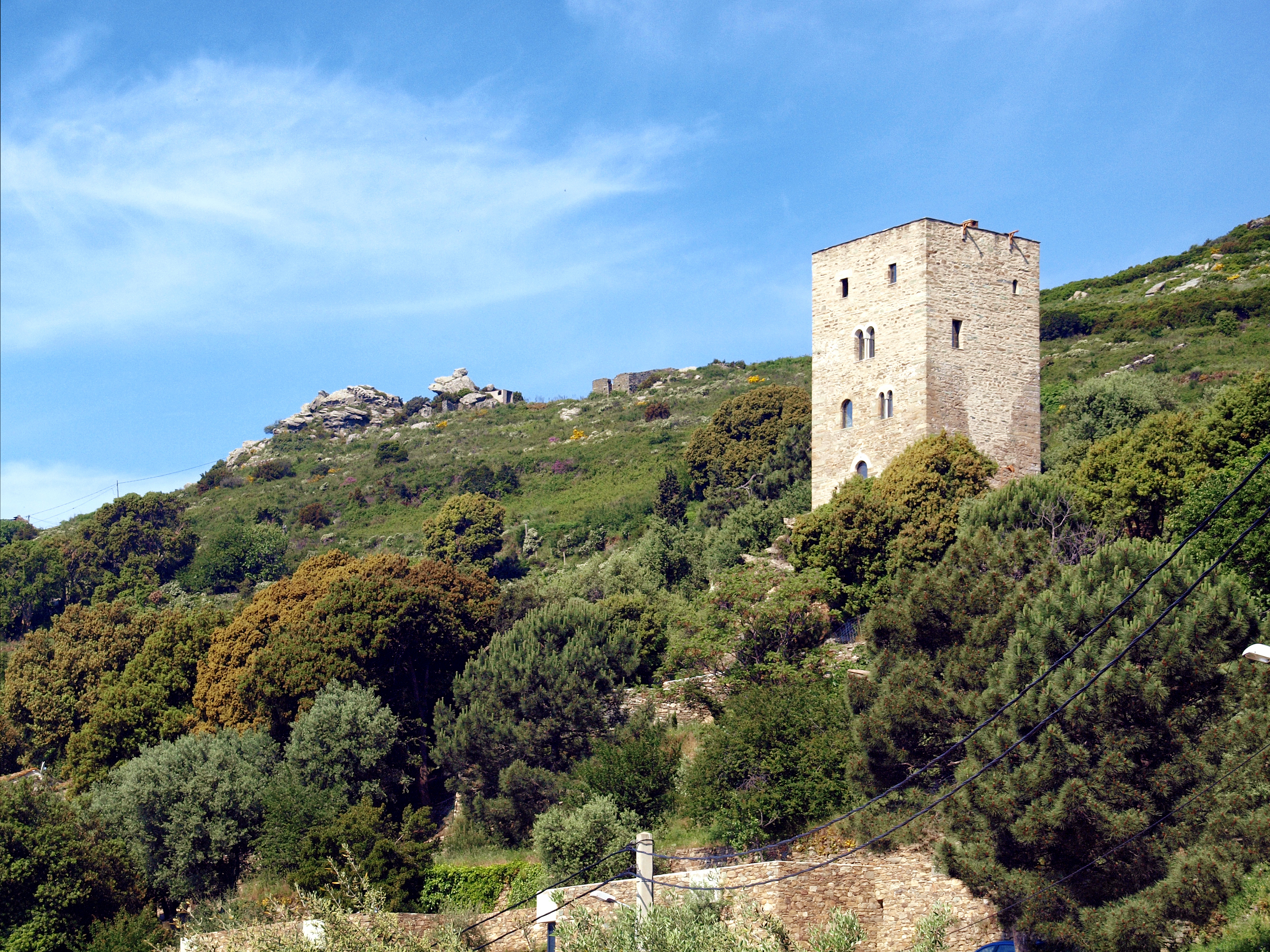
La Vetrice Tower

Before the occupation of Corsica by the Genoese there were several communities of the pieve of Orto: Soverta, La Vetrice, Belgodere, Astima, and Le Corbaia. All these villages have today almost disappeared. On the coast there was a small hamlet inhabited by fishermen called Porto Cardo which means "Cardo Port".

=== Modern times ===
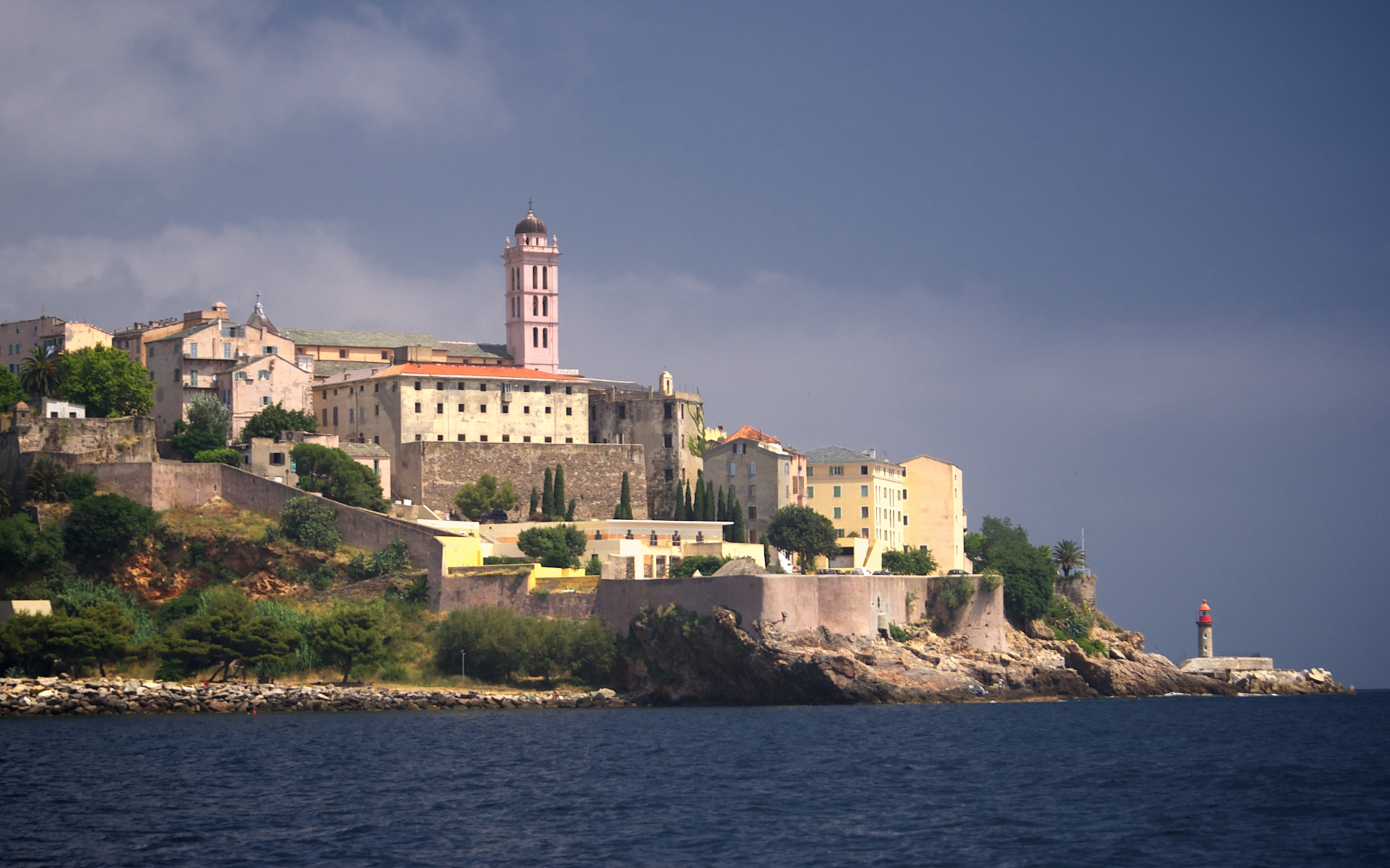
The citadel, built by the Genoese

In the 16th and 17th centuries, the Franciscans settled in the Pieve of Orto.

At the beginning of the 16th century, Monseigneur Agostino Giustiniani, Bishop of Nebbio, described in his Dialogo nominato Corsica:

"[...] The pieve of Orto is almost ruined; it contains 340 fires. In this piève is Biguglia with a convent of Friars Minor [...]. With Biguglia there are still these pièves: Furiani, Belgodere, Soverta, La Vetrice, and Corbaia; nowadays, all these villages have almost disappeared."

– Agostino Giustiniani in Description of Corsica, translation by Lucien Auguste Letteron in History of Corsica, Bulletin of the Society for Historical and Natural Sciences of Corsica – Volume I – 1888, p. 50. (in French)

Continuing, he writes:

"It is in this piève Bastia lies, home to the Bishop and Governor of Corsica. Before the last war this city had 700 houses divided into two districts: Terranova and Terravecchia. There was formerly in this place a castle or tower, or rather a fortress of the kind called on the continent Bastie [...]. Terravecchia was an open area which is now burned and ruined largely as a result of the war. The land is very steep on the lower slopes and walking is very painful; on the other hand the Terranova area is generally flat, with fairly wide streets and many modern houses. It is surrounded not only by a solid wall, which forms a continuous enclosure, but a wide and deep moat and magnificent bastions. The wall was begun in the time of Tomasino de Campofregoso, then lord of the island, and completed later through the efforts of the Bank of Saint George. The bastions and the moat were made by that same bank and by the Genoese government during the last war. The bank has added a very beautiful citadel but the benefits do not match the expense it required during its construction; it cost, in fact, 25,000 ducats. Bastia has two convents of Friars Minor, one of Recollects, and the other Capuchin. This city, being the governor's residence, prospered greatly but it also had much to suffer in recent wars. Although the main centre on the island many people were of the opinion that its importance will hardly increase. The first reason they give is that the population of the city is composed of Genoese and Corsicans: the Genoese, from Rivières, belong to the lower class. Most Corsicans also belonged in this class. There is a jealousy and rivalry between the inhabitants of Bastia so great that few mind the interests of the city: they apply themselves only to deceit and to oust each other and that is where we get all the evil. The second reason is that the city has no port. It has in fact a small bay where it is possible to relax on small boats. On the other hand, houses, until now, have been very poorly distributed. There is not one that has a stable nor even a well or a cistern, so that it is necessary to fetch water from the fountain outside. Also in summer the water is very hot because it comes from far away via an aqueduct.

The cellars are far from being good. Bastia is built on a rocky ground, where ducts and sewers can be dug only with great difficulty. The city has no pleasant walks and is also very exposed to the West Wind which sometimes lasts for eight or ten days, so we can not leave home because the wind is so strong that it shakes the houses. What is more advantageous for Bastia is to be near fertile country that produces some wine, such as at Cap Corse, and elsewhere wheat, as on the higher pièves. There is a at the doorstep and only a short distance from Piombino and other mainland locations. It is for these reasons, and not for others, that the Board has chosen Bastia to make the residence of its governors: because there is nowhere on the island where the governor would be better off than at Bastia".

– Agostino Giustiniani in Description of Corsica, translation by Lucien Auguste Letteron in History of Corsica. (in French)

He ends his description as follows:

"There were still in the piève of Orto two small villages with the main pieve church dedicated to Saint Mary. These two villages and the church were ruined after the last plague and also because of the negligence of the piévans. After Porraggia comes Punta d'Arco and the Chiurlino Lake, about ten miles long, which can be entered only by very small boats. In this lake is an island, where there is good hunting for wild boar. This place is called the island. There are also two other small islands where fishermen stay: one is called Ischia nova which became famous in the recent wars and the other is called Ischia Vacchia. There is fishing in this lake for cephalic (cefalu or mazzardi), mullet (muggini), and other fish that make excellent Botargo. These fish and eels are taken in large quantities and serve as ordinary food for the inhabitants of Bastia, not to mention the fish that comes from the pièves of Orto, Mariana and Mercurio. Then comes the Port of Lo Pino then the Gulf of Bastia, which is called Portocardo by the sailors. There is then the Ruisseau de S. Nicolas, then successively the Port of Toga, Grigione, the port and Ruisseau di Pietranera where there is a tower."

– Agostino Giustiniani in Description of Corsica, translation by Lucien Auguste Letteron in History of Corsica. (in French)

=== The Genoese era ===
The Genoese soon felt the need to protect Bastia from invasions coming from the sea and began to build a bastiglia (moat) and a citadel in the time of governor Leonello Lomellini.

Over time, the Bastiglia (Bastia) has grown, become prosperous, and become more important than Cardo.

Its history is in its "bastiglia" or citadel which was originally a walled city. Here it was the sea and the mountains that determined the location of habitations as well as the relief of the island. Bastia was the capital at the time of the Genoese domination. It spread to the slopes later, drawn toward the water in the Place Saint-Nicolas.

Created by the Genoese patrician Leonello Lomellini in 1353 to liaise with Genoa, the city originated on the roack where a tower was built (a bastiglia, hence its name) and, a hundred years later, was surrounded by walls.

At the beginning of the 18th century, many improvements were made in the Punta district, where many shops were built. Bastia and the whole island came under French military domination on 8 May 1769.

In 1794, during a war with Revolutionary France, British troops under Admiral Nelson and Lieutenant-General David Dundas briefly captured Bastia.

In 1848, Bastia took 44 hectares from Ville-di-Pietrabugno.

=== Heraldry ===
Arms of Bastia	Blazon: Azure, a fortress Argent, turreted, masoned, windows, and port of Sable on a terrace in base Vert.

== Geography ==
Located in the northeast of Corsica at the base of the Cap Corse, between the sea and the mountain, Bastia is the principal port of the island. The city is 35 km (22 mi) from the northern tip of the Cap Corse, 50 km (31 mi) west from Elba, an Italian island, and 90 km (56 mi) away from continental Italy which can be seen a few days per year when visibility is excellent.

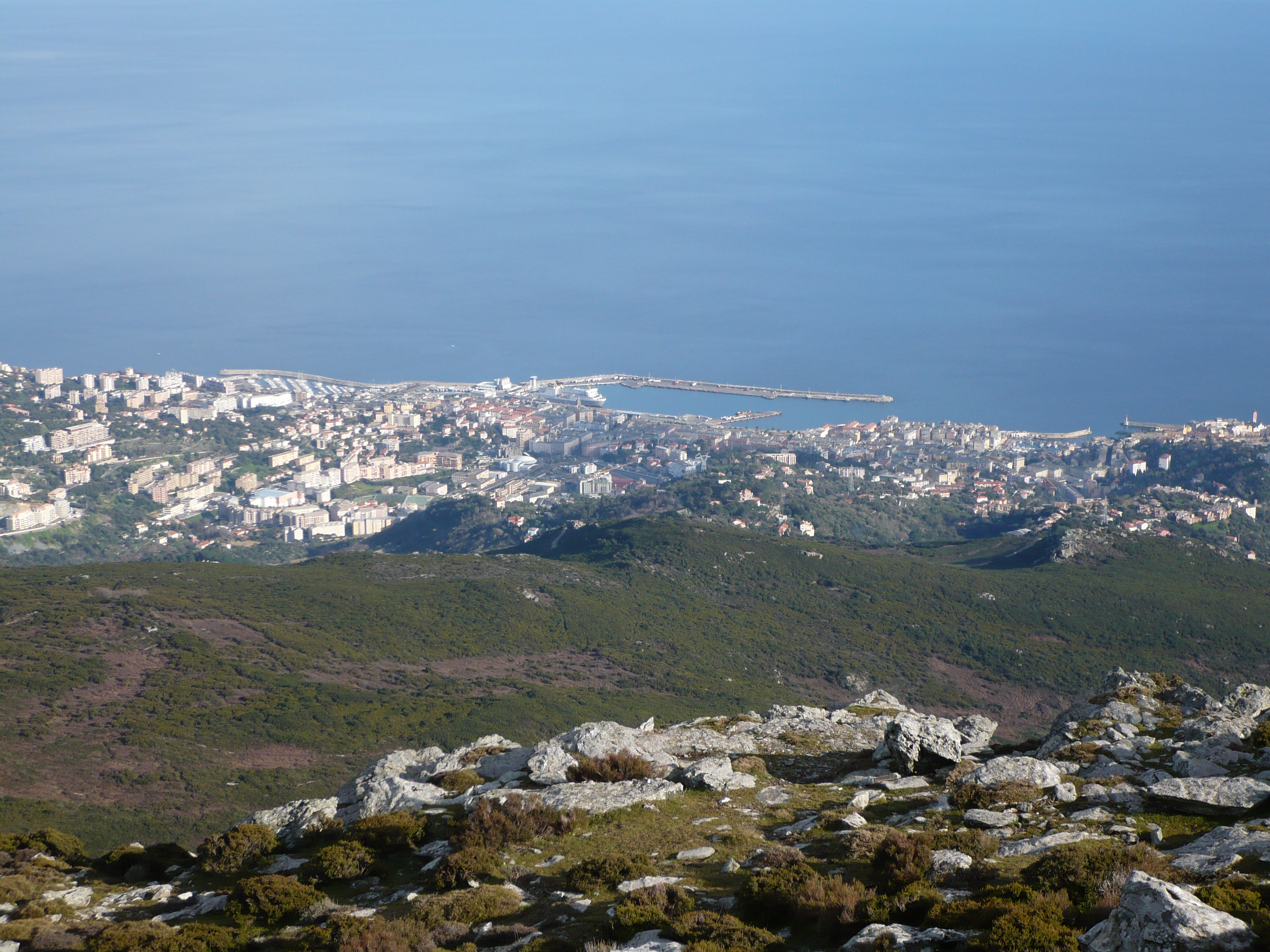
The city of Bastia as seen from the "Pigno": notice the lack of constructions in the foreground and the city along the coast in the background

In terms of geography, Bastia is defined by its position between the sea and the mountain. The city is on the Eastern side of the "Serra di Pignu", a 960 m (3,150 ft) mountain (see photo opposite). This steep mountain and several hills in the city shape a relief typical of the Cap Corse. This pronounced landscape caused the city to develop mostly on a coastal band about 1.5 km (1 mi) wide, which is a very limited part of the 19.38 km^{2} (7.48 sq mi) that the commune has.

Above all, Bastia is a port, and the sea has of course a significant role in the spatial organization of the city. Bastia possesses nowadays three different ports. The old port ("Vieux Port" in French and "Portu Vechju" in Corsican), in a remarkable and narrow cove, offers good natural shelter against the climatic hazards of the Mediterranean Sea. Thus, it was at the core of the initial development of the city. Nowadays, many pleasure and fishing boats are still there, but it is not as economically vital than the other more modern ports, although its touristic and aesthetic charm almost makes the old port the official emblem of the city. In fact, many cafés, bars and restaurants have moved to its docks to which access is now pedestrian.

A bit more to the north is the commercial and ferry port. As a major economic asset of the city, the "port de commerce" is the pulse of the city. It is even more so during the summer when ferry arrivals and departures of thousands of passengers and cars can sometimes cause long traffic jams along the north–south axis, the national road RN193. In front of the commercial port, the large Saint-Nicolas square represents the heart of the city. Just north of the commercial port, the Toga marina, named after a city neighborhood, is a harbor for leisure boating activities like sailing and yachting. There are also some bars, restaurants and night clubs on its docks.

Thus, Bastia is organized on a relatively narrow north–south axis which can make access to the city centre difficult under particular circumstances. Nowadays, the city centre is mainly composed of the "citadelle", the stronghold, also called Terra-Nova, with the Genoese Governors' Palace, the old port and port quarter and the market plaza, and finally the ensemble of buildings along the "Boulevard Paoli", the main commercial street of the city, which lies from the Justice Court to the Avenue Maréchal Sebastiani.

During the last few decades, Bastia and its region have experienced a strong demographic growth, which has caused somewhat of a suburban crawl in the south of the city, because of the congestion of the city center.

=== Geology and relief ===
The commune is in the Alpine Eastern Corsica region. (Note: This region consists of a range of terrain resulting from a vanished ocean called Liguro-Piedmont (in the Tethys Ocean whose age is between 170 to 60 Million years old) and its continental margins. The age of the Alpine Corsica region ranges from Triassic to recent.) which is formed from "a succession of autochthons (fixed terrain), para-autochtons (weakly displaced terrain) and especially allochthons (highly displaced terrain). The first two coincide roughly with the central depression. The allochhtons are mainly in the area of lustrous schists and ophiolites corresponding to the eastern relief (Cap Corse and Castagniccia)".

Its base rests on a granite bedrock (Felsic granites from the Hercynian, plain rocks), which has been covered with oceanic layers of:

- Sedimentary rocks (Miocene to Quaternary) on the east coast, ranging from the mouth of the Ruisseau de Lupino north to the south bank of the mouth of the Travo
- lustrous schists along the entire eastern side of Cap Corse,
- ophiolite deposited in eastern Corsica during the Eocene period.

Note the presence of copper ore in Cardo which was once the subject of a concession.

Geographically, Bastia is characterized by its location between the sea and the mountains. The commune lies on the eastern flank of the "Serra di Pignu" a mountain which rises to 960 m above sea level. This steep mountain with other hills around Bastia forms the typical terrain of Cap Corse. This pronounced relief largely explains the development of the city on a coastal strip of about 1.5 km in width which is a very limited proportion of the 19.38 km2 of the whole commune.

=== Hydrography ===
The river network is sparse. There are three small streams (or fiumes) flowing from west to east:

- in the north the Ruisseau Fiuminale rises in the north-west of the commune 400 m north-east of Monte Muzzone (920 m). Along its length of 4.3 kilometres it forms the border between the communes of Bastia and Ville-di-Pietrabugno from its source to the roundabout of the Annunciation. Part of its course is covered in the city from the path of the Annunciation to the port where it empties into the Tyrrhenian Sea. It is fed by the Ruisseau de Cardo. (Note: The Ruisseau de Cardo is not mentioned in the Sandre database)
- in the centre, the Ruisseau de Lupino is also 4.3 kilometres long with its source in the commune near the Cima Orcaio (769 m). The stream is covered from the Abbatoir crossroad to its mouth.
- in the south the Ruisseau de Corbaia, 5.3 kilometres long. Its source is in the old quarry near the Col de Teghime.

=== Climate and vegetation ===
Bastia possesses a Mediterranean climate. The average annual temperature is 16.3 °C (61 °F) and the average coldest night of the year barely goes below freezing. Winds are frequent and violent, precipitation copious, but there are also 240 sunny days on average per year.

Climate data for Bastia (1991–2020 averages, extremes 1947–present)
Month	Jan	Feb	Mar	Apr	May	Jun	Jul	Aug	Sep	Oct	Nov	Dec	Year
Record high °C (°F)	25.1 (77.2)	26.6 (79.9)	27.1 (80.8)	25.4 (77.7)	30.7 (87.3)	35.7 (96.3)	36.7 (98.1)	38.3 (100.9)	34.3 (93.7)	29.7 (85.5)	28.0 (82.4)	24.0 (75.2)	38.3 (100.9)
Mean maximum °C (°F)	18.4 (65.1)	18.5 (65.3)	20.5 (68.9)	22.4 (72.3)	27.0 (80.6)	30.6 (87.1)	32.6 (90.7)	33.3 (91.9)	30.1 (86.2)	26.3 (79.3)	22.1 (71.8)	19.9 (67.8)	34.1 (93.4)
Mean daily maximum °C (°F)	13.8 (56.8)	13.9 (57.0)	15.8 (60.4)	18.3 (64.9)	22.4 (72.3)	26.4 (79.5)	29.4 (84.9)	29.8 (85.6)	26.0 (78.8)	22.0 (71.6)	17.7 (63.9)	14.8 (58.6)	20.9 (69.6)
Daily mean °C (°F)	9.6 (49.3)	9.5 (49.1)	11.3 (52.3)	13.7 (56.7)	17.5 (63.5)	21.4 (70.5)	24.4 (75.9)	24.8 (76.6)	21.4 (70.5)	17.7 (63.9)	13.6 (56.5)	10.6 (51.1)	16.3 (61.3)
Mean daily minimum °C (°F)	5.4 (41.7)	5.1 (41.2)	6.8 (44.2)	9.1 (48.4)	12.6 (54.7)	16.4 (61.5)	19.4 (66.9)	19.8 (67.6)	16.7 (62.1)	13.4 (56.1)	9.5 (49.1)	6.4 (43.5)	11.7 (53.1)
Mean minimum °C (°F)	1.1 (34.0)	0.9 (33.6)	2.4 (36.3)	4.6 (40.3)	8.6 (47.5)	12.4 (54.3)	15.9 (60.6)	16.4 (61.5)	12.6 (54.7)	8.8 (47.8)	4.4 (39.9)	1.2 (34.2)	−0.4 (31.3)
Record low °C (°F)	−4.6 (23.7)	−5.0 (23.0)	−3.8 (25.2)	0.5 (32.9)	3.1 (37.6)	8.2 (46.8)	10.2 (50.4)	11.8 (53.2)	7.6 (45.7)	2.8 (37.0)	−0.5 (31.1)	−3.3 (26.1)	−5.0 (23.0)
Average precipitation mm (inches)	67.3 (2.65)	63.5 (2.50)	63.7 (2.51)	71.6 (2.82)	53.7 (2.11)	38.8 (1.53)	13.8 (0.54)	21.1 (0.83)	74.5 (2.93)	126.5 (4.98)	134.3 (5.29)	88.1 (3.47)	816.9 (32.16)
Average precipitation days (≥ 1.0 mm)	5.8	6.2	6.7	6.9	5.3	3.1	1.5	2.2	5.3	7.1	9.3	8.0	67.3
Average snowy days	0.9	0.7	0.3	0.0	0.0	0.0	0.0	0.0	0.0	0.0	0.1	0.4	2.5
Average relative humidity (%)	73	73	72	74	76	73	70	71	75	76	75	74	73.5
Mean monthly sunshine hours	139.2	159.1	196.4	220.1	269.9	305.6	347.3	314.0	237.9	182.1	134.4	139.0	2,644.9
Source 1: Météo France
Source 2: Infoclimat.fr (humidity 1961–1990)

Comparison of local Meteorological data with other cities in France
Town	Sunshine (hours/yr)	Rain (mm/yr)	Snow (days/yr)	Storm (days/yr)	Fog (days/yr)
National average	1,973	770	14	22	40
Bastia	2,602.9	771.3	1.6	33.3	2.7
Paris	1,661	637	12	18	10
Nice	2,724	767	1	29	1
Strasbourg	1,693	665	29	29	56
Brest	1,605	1,211	7	12	75

The commune has two levels of vegetation as a result of its climate but also the flora:

- Thermo-mediterranean level: from 1 to 100 metres altitude on the south-facing slope. This level is characterized by a dry summer season from two to three months that promotes wild olives, white asparagus, Mastics, Tree Spurges, Clematis, etc.
- Meso-Mediterranean level: from 100 to 1000 m above sea level on the south-facing slope and 0 to 700m on the north slope. This level, with cooler temperatures, is characterized mainly by the holm oak, Maquis shrubland and arbutus but also by cork oak and maritime pine (on the sunny side), the downy oak (on the shady side), chestnut, lavender, broom, cistus, and lentisk. On the heights, between bare rocks, vegetation is stubbly – swept by frequent and violent westerly and south-westerly winds (the Libeccio) which become stronger after crossing the ridge of the Serra di Pigno and blow down along the valleys to the sea. The winds form remarkable lenticular clouds off Bastia.

== Transport ==
=== Road transport ===
There are three main access roads to Bastia:

- from the South: by the Route nationale N193. A portion of about 23 km is 2×2 lanes between Arena and Vescovato since the inauguration of the "expressway Borgo-Vescovato" in January 2013. This is the major road axis into the Bastia region because it connects the city of Bastia directly or indirectly to all other Corsican towns (Ajaccio, Corte, Porto-Vecchio, Calvi etc.) while also passing through the main cities of the peripheral region of Bastia such as Furiani, Biguglia, Borgo, and Lucciana where Bastia Poretta Airport is. This road is also called the Waterfront Route from the Montesoro district because it runs along the seafront up to the Old Port Tunnel which runs under the citadel and the Old Port. This road ultimately ends at Ajaccio.
- from the West:, by the D81, a road which goes to Saint-Florent via the Col de Teghime.
- from the North: by the D80, which goes in a loop around Cap Corse (the road between Bastia and Pietranera was opened in 1829).

=== Bus transport ===
The urban area of Bastia is served by a bus network with 14 routes operated by the Autobus Bastiais company.

=== Rail transport ===
Bastia railway station belongs to Chemins de fer de la Corse, and is in the city centre. There are services to Ajaccio and Calvi. There are also 7 other Bastia rail stops for suburban services to Casamozza: Lupino, Rivoli, Bassanese, Arinella, Montesoro, Sole-Meo, Erbajolo.

=== Sea transport ===
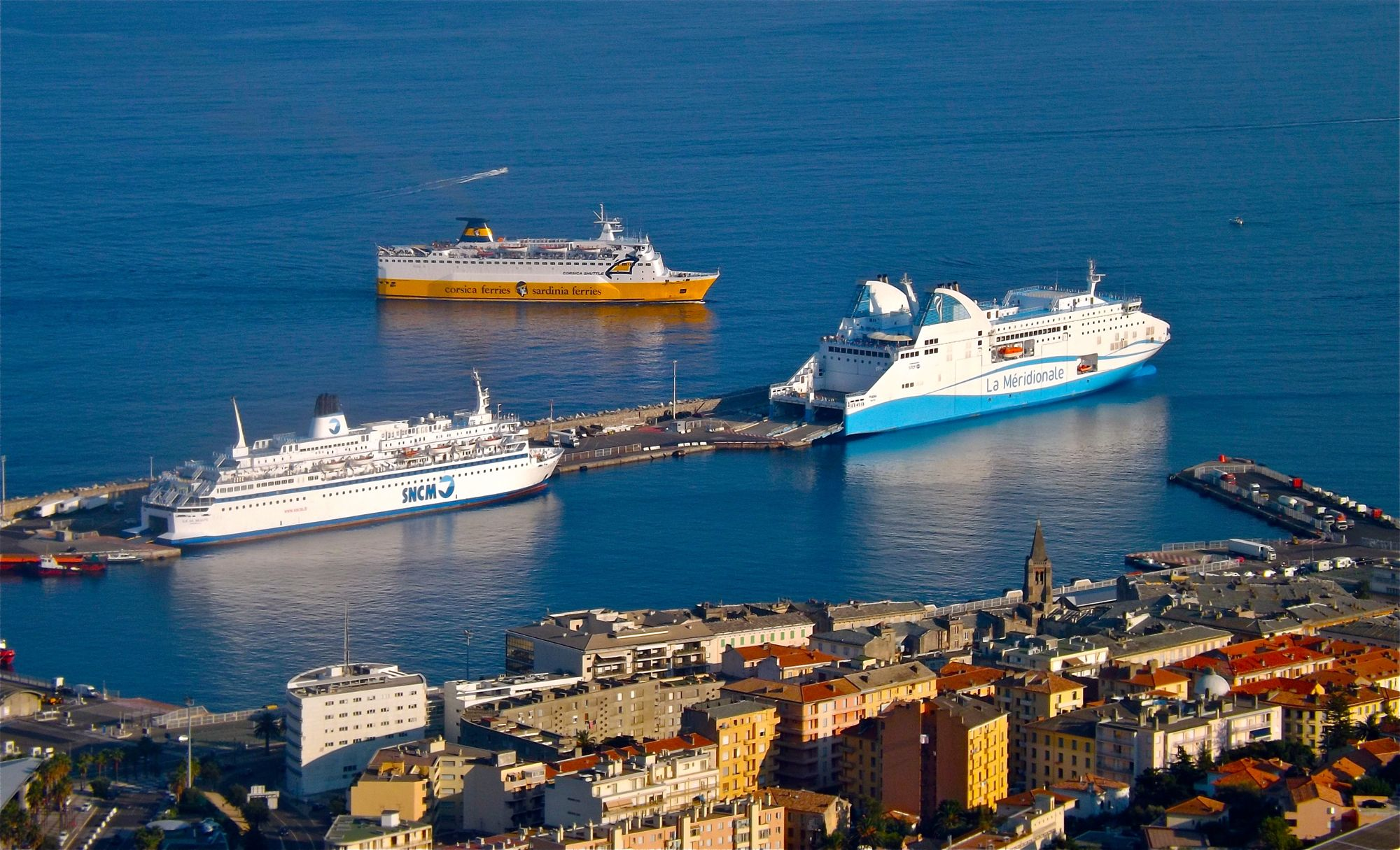
Port of Bastia

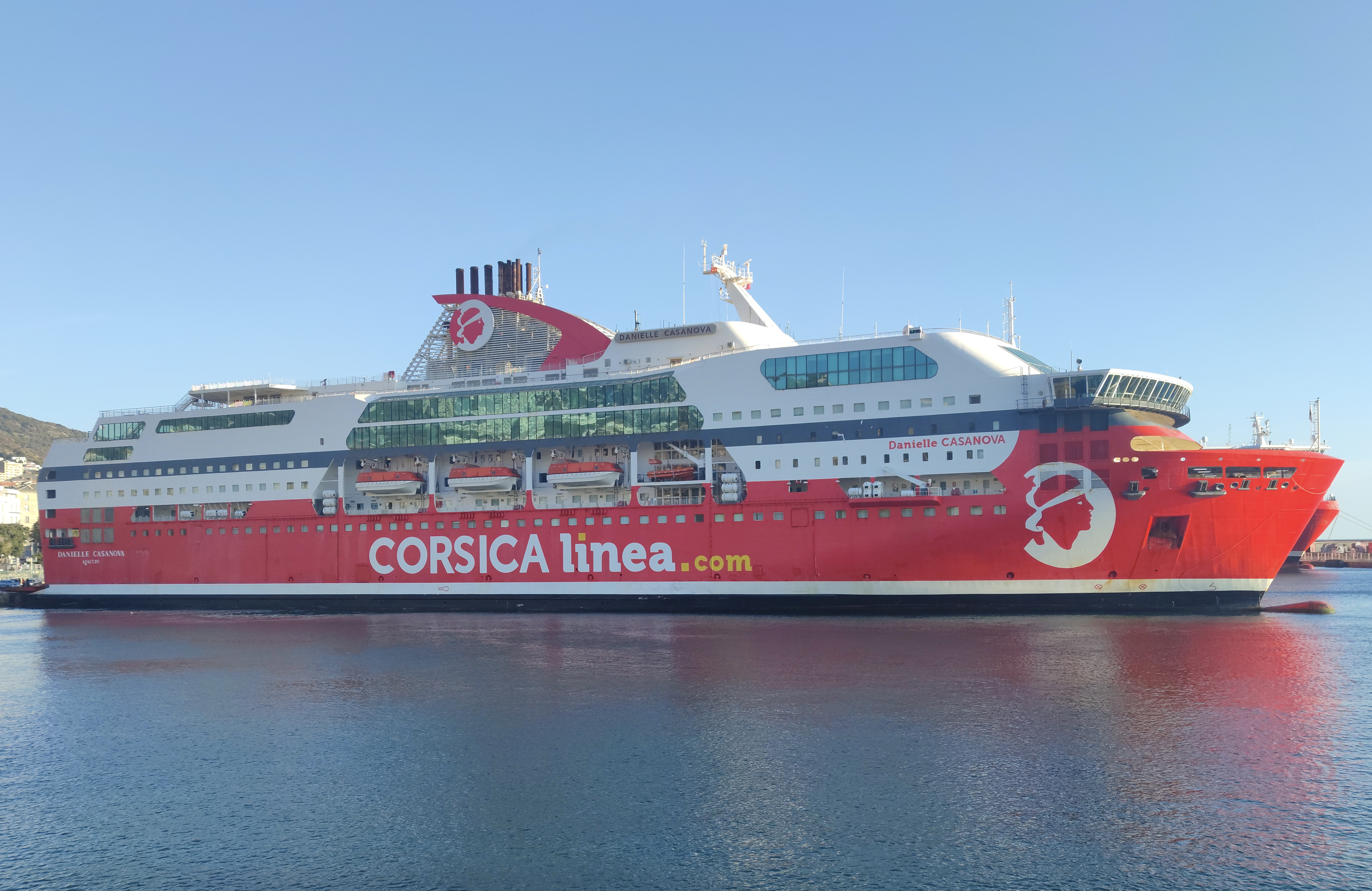
Ferry MS Danielle Casanova.

Despite its small size the port of Bastia is the busiest French port on the Mediterranean Sea with 2,291,944 passengers in 2011.

This makes it the second busiest French port behind Calais (about 15 million passengers).

Ports served from Bastia are:

Port	No. of Passengers in 2014	%age
Toulon	548,071	25.6%
Livorno (Italy)	529,822	24.7%
Marseille	253,899	11.9%
Nice	340,007	15.9%
Savona (Italy)	324,512	15.2%
Genoa (Italy)	110,997	5.2%
Other routes	19,790	0.9%
Portoferraio (Italy)	14,283	0.6%
Total	2,141,381	100%

Source: CCI Haute Corse – Port Statistics 2014 (p. 12)

Domestic traffic is 47.4% against 52.6% international traffic.

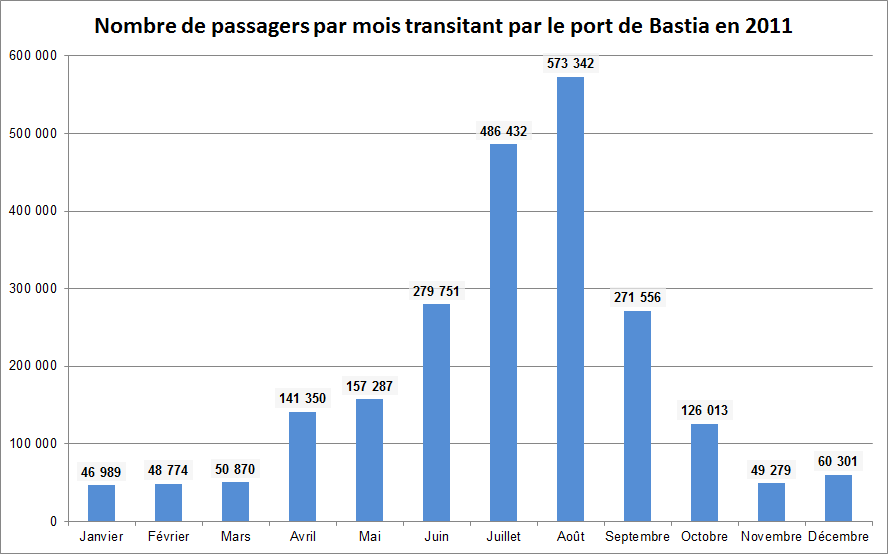
No. of passengers per month transiting the port of Bastia in 2011

Port Seasonality

As shown in the adjacent diagram, shipping and passenger traffic is characterized by a very marked seasonality. This is explained by the importance of summer tourism for the economy of Corsica. Thus the traffic is multiplied by eleven in the high season (July–August). This seasonality has a very strong impact on the city of Bastia, as on all Corsica. The city must be equipped with the necessary infrastructure to be able to accommodate such numbers of passengers even though it is for a short time each year.

Port Passenger Market share

There is a clear dominance by Corsica Ferries:

Shipping Company	No. of passengers transported in 2014	Market share
Corsica Ferries	5,611,350	74.0%
SNCM	854,204	11.3%
Moby Lines	840,000	11.1%
La Méridionale	281,700	3.7%
Total	7,587,254	100%

=== Air transport ===
The Bastia – Poretta Airport is 16 kilometres (9.9 mi) south of the city in the commune of Lucciana. It is the second-largest airport in Corsica by passenger numbers after Ajaccio Napoleon Bonaparte Airport.

It serves several French airports including Paris-Orly, Paris-Charles de Gaulle, Marseille-Provence, Nice-Côte d'Azur, and Lyon-Saint-Exupery.

There are also some European routes such as London, Geneva, and Cologne. The main airlines are Air Corsica, Air France, EasyJet, Luxair, British Airways, and Volotea.

== Administration ==
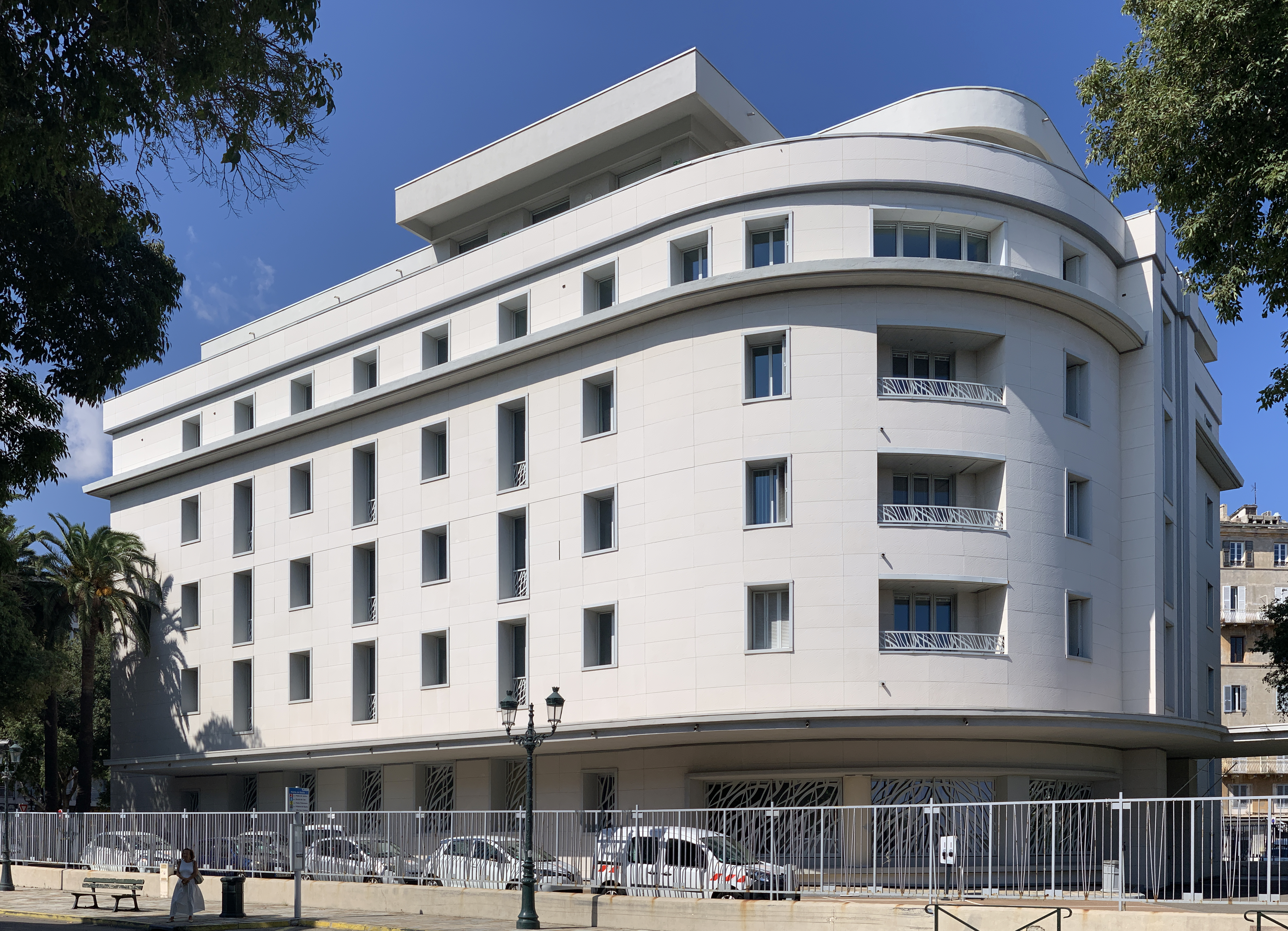
The Hotel de Ville

=== Lists of mayors ===
Mayors from 1770 to 1941

From	To	Name
1770	1778	Pierre Poggi
1779	1789	Pierre-François Rigo
1789	1791	B. Carrafa
1791	1794	Jean-Baptiste Galeazzini
1794	1795	Casimir Poggi
1795	1796	Pierre-Antoine Casella
1796	1798	Jean Benedetti
1798	1798	Dominique Bozio
1798	1798	Paul-Louis Stefanini
1798	1799	Jean-Baptiste Ristori
1799	1800	Pierre-Antoine Casella
1800	1800	Ignace Agostini
1800	1808	Pierre Giovellina
1808	1814	Charles Cecconi
1814	1815	Charles Vanucci
1815	1815	Pierre Antoni
1815	1816	Romuald Ficarella
1816	1818	Antoine Carbuccia
1818	1820	Joseph Graziani
1821	1827	Jean-Antoine Didau
1828	1831	Antoine-Hyacinthe Lota
1831	1833	Antoine-Pierre Lota
1833	1840	Antoine-Hyacinthe Lota
1840	1843	Antoine-Joseph Casevecchie
1843	1848	Antoine-Sébastien Lazarotti
1848	1848	Philippe Caraffa
1848	1851	Horace Carbuccia
1851	1854	François Lota
1854	1858	Vincent Piccioni
1858	1865	François-Hyacinthe d'Angelis
1865	1870	Antoine Piccioni
1870	1871	Antoine Fabiani
1871	1879	Ignace Bonelli
1871	1871	Patrice de Corsi
1879	1881	Jean-Jacques Ajaccio
1881	1882	Auguste Etretti
1882	1888	Ignace Bonelli
1888	1912	Auguste Gaudin
1912	1917	Jean-Baptiste de Caraffa
1917	1919	Lucien Dupello
1919	1937	Emile Sari
1937	1941	Hyacinthe de Montera

Mayors from 1941

From	To	Name	Party
1941	1943	Joseph Gerardi	
1943	1945	Jacques Faggianelli	
1945	1947	Hyacinthe de Montera	
1947	1968	Jacques Faggianelli	Radical
1968	1989	Jean Crucien Zuccarelli	MRG
1989	1997	Emile Pierre Dominique Zuccarelli	PRG
1997	2000	Albert Calloni	
2000	2014	Émile Zuccarelli	
2014	2016	Gilles Simeoni	
2016	2026	Pierre Savelli	

The Hotel de Ville was completed in around 1965.

=== Subdivisions ===
The Agglomeration Community of Bastia includes 5 communes with a total population of 57,276 in 2010.

Bastia is divided into four cantons, Canton of Bastia-1, Canton of Bastia-2, Canton of Bastia-3, and Canton of Bastia-4.

=== Twinning ===
Bastia has twinning associations with:

- Erding (Germany) since 1980.
- Viareggio (Italy) since 1980.

== Demographics ==
Historical population

Year	Pop.	±% p.a.
1800	11,336	—
1806	7,922	−5.80%
1821	9,316	+1.09%
1831	9,531	+0.23%
1836	13,610	+7.39%
1841	14,568	+1.37%
1846	15,004	+0.59%
1851	15,985	+1.27%
1856	16,002	+0.02%
1861	19,304	+3.82%
1866	21,535	+2.21%
1872	17,850	−3.08%
1875	17,572	−0.52%
1876	20,100	+14.39%
1880	20,765	+0.82%
1885	23,397	+2.42%
1890	22,552	−0.73%
1895	25,425	+2.43%

Year	Pop.	±% p.a.
1900	27,338	+1.46%
1905	39,412	+7.59%
1910	33,094	−3.43%
1926	36,376	+0.59%
1931	44,628	+4.17%
1936	52,208	+3.19%
1946	49,327	−0.57%
1954	42,729	−1.78%
1962	31,375	−3.79%
1968	38,746	+3.58%
1975	42,810	+1.44%
1982	44,020	+0.40%
1990	37,845	−1.87%
1999	37,884	+0.01%
2007	43,315	+1.69%
2012	43,479	+0.08%
2017	45,715	+1.01%
2023	46,867	+0.42%

Source: EHESS and INSEE

=== Education ===
The commune has 10 kindergartens, 13 primary schools, 5 colleges (middle schools), and 7 High schools.

There is also a research institute of the engineering school of Arts et Métiers ParisTech (ENSAM). This institute was opened in 2000 and offers doctoral programs and specialized Masters in the field of renewable energy.

Bastia is the location of one of five regional institutes of administration (IRA) in France for the training of future administrative officials.

== Health ==
Bastia has a hospital in the Paese Novu district (Falconaja Hospital) and a clinic (Maymard Clinic) in the city centre as well as another clinic specializing in ophthalmology (Filippi clinic) in the Saint-Antoine district.

Around the city there is also the Zuccarelli Clinic (Toga district) and a polyclinic 2 km from the centre of town at Furiani.

== Sports ==
SC Bastia is the football club for Bastia. The Armand-Cesari Stadium is in the neighbouring commune of Furiani. The club was a finalist in the UEFA Cup competition in 1978 and winner of the Coupe de France in 1981. They were also finalists in the Coupe de France in 1972 and 2002, Champion of France in Ligue 2 in 1968 and 2012, as well as National Champion of France in 2011. In 2015 SC Bastia played and lost the final of the League Cup against PSG, 20 years after playing them in the same competition in 1995. The club currently plays in the Championnat National, following their demotion from Ligue 2 in the 2016–17 season.

Besides SC Bastia there are two other amateur football clubs: ÉF Bastia and another club which used to be known as CA Bastia. CA's highest point was playing in Ligue 2 during the 2013–14 season, however immediate relegation from Ligue 2, and further relegation from the Championnat National in 16–17 led them to merge with fellow lower league club Borgo, and form FC Bastia-Borgo, who currently play in the Championnat. A fourth club, the Football Corsica Club Bastiais (FCCB) disappeared after playing in six amateur championships in Corsica in the 1950s Historically each of these four clubs was supported by a different part of the city: the Place Saint-Nicolas district were blue (SC Bastia), the Old Port was black (CA Bastia), the citadel and the Saint Joseph district were white (EF Bastia), and the market area was red (FCCB). Sporting dominance has overshadowed other clubs in Bastia over time. At the end of the 2012/2013 season there were for the first time two professional clubs in Bastia: SC Bastia in Ligue 1 and the CA Bastia promoted from National, for a total of four Corsican professional football clubs (with AC Ajaccio in Ligue 1 and GFC Ajaccio, at that point in Ligue 2).

Bastia was also a city-stage in the Tour de France 2013: the arrival point of the first stage from Porto-Vecchio and starting point for the second to Ajaccio.

Bastia was formerly the headquarters for the French round of the FIA World Rally Championship.

== Town planning ==
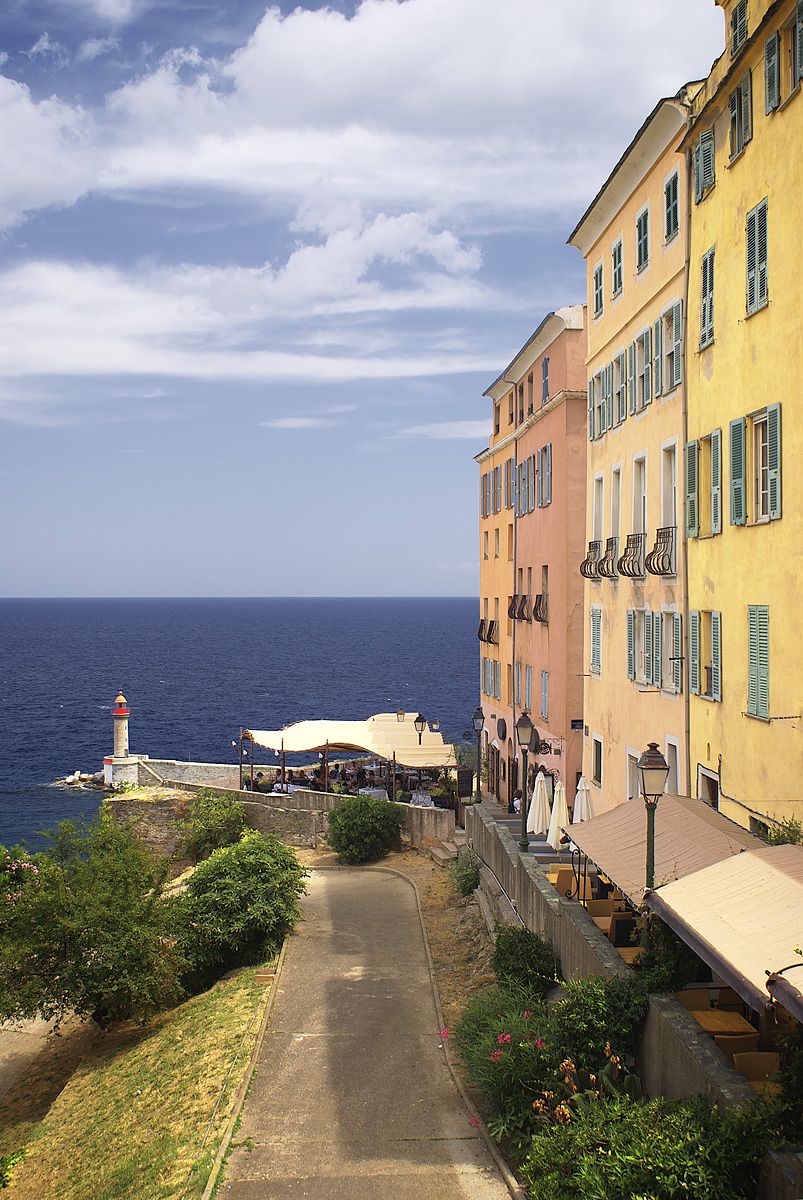
View from the Citadel

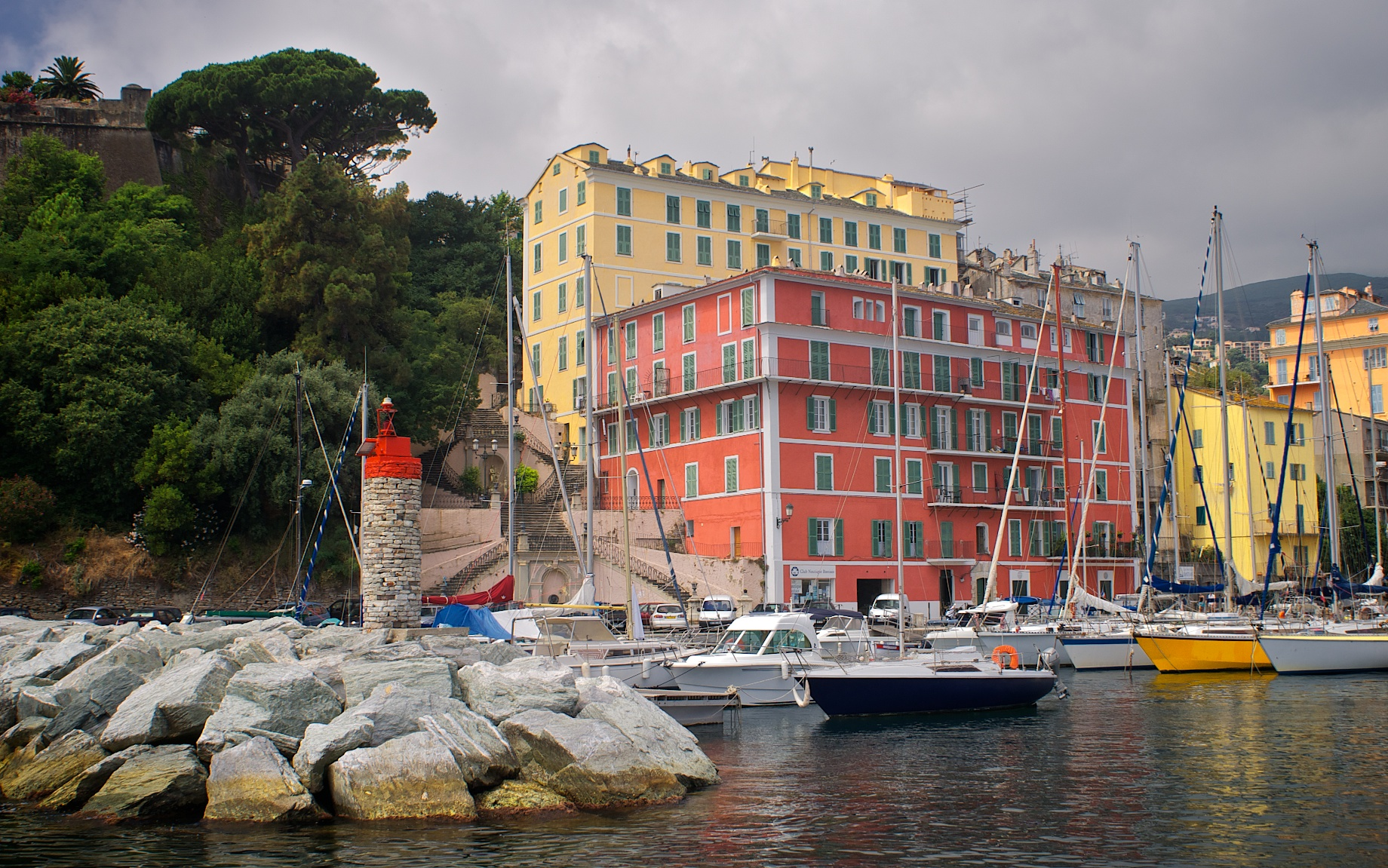
Coloured façades in the Old Port

Bastia is primarily a port city so the sea has a predominant place in the spatial organization of the city. Nowadays Bastia has three different ports.

- The Old Port: is in a narrow cove that gives good protection against the Mediterranean weather. It was therefore at the heart of the initial development of the city. Today it still is home to many yachts and fishing boats but it is not so economically vital for the city than the other modern ports, although its tourism and aesthetic appeal makes it an almost official emblem of Bastia. Many bar-cafes and restaurants have opened on its quays whose streets are pedestrian access only in the summer.
- The Commercial Port: a little north of the Old Port, it is the major economic asset of the city. This is especially true in the summer period when thousands of arrivals and departures of passengers and vehicles can sometimes cause long traffic jams along Route nationale N193 despite the existence of a tunnel under the Old Port. Opposite the commercial port is the vast Place Saint Nicolas which is the heart of the city.
- The Toga Marina: north of the commercial port partly in Ville-di-Pietrabugno is occupied by many sailboats and yachts. There are also several bars, restaurants and nightclubs on its quays.

=== The city centre and outlying urban areas ===
Today the city centre consists mainly of the citadel (also called Terra Nova), the Palace of the Governors, the Old Port with its surrounding neighbourhood and the market place, and finally all the buildings along the Paoli Boulevard – the main commercial street of the city which stretches from the courthouse to the Avenue Maréchal Sebastiani.

In recent decades Bastia and its region have had strong demographic growth which has now grown beyond the municipal boundaries.

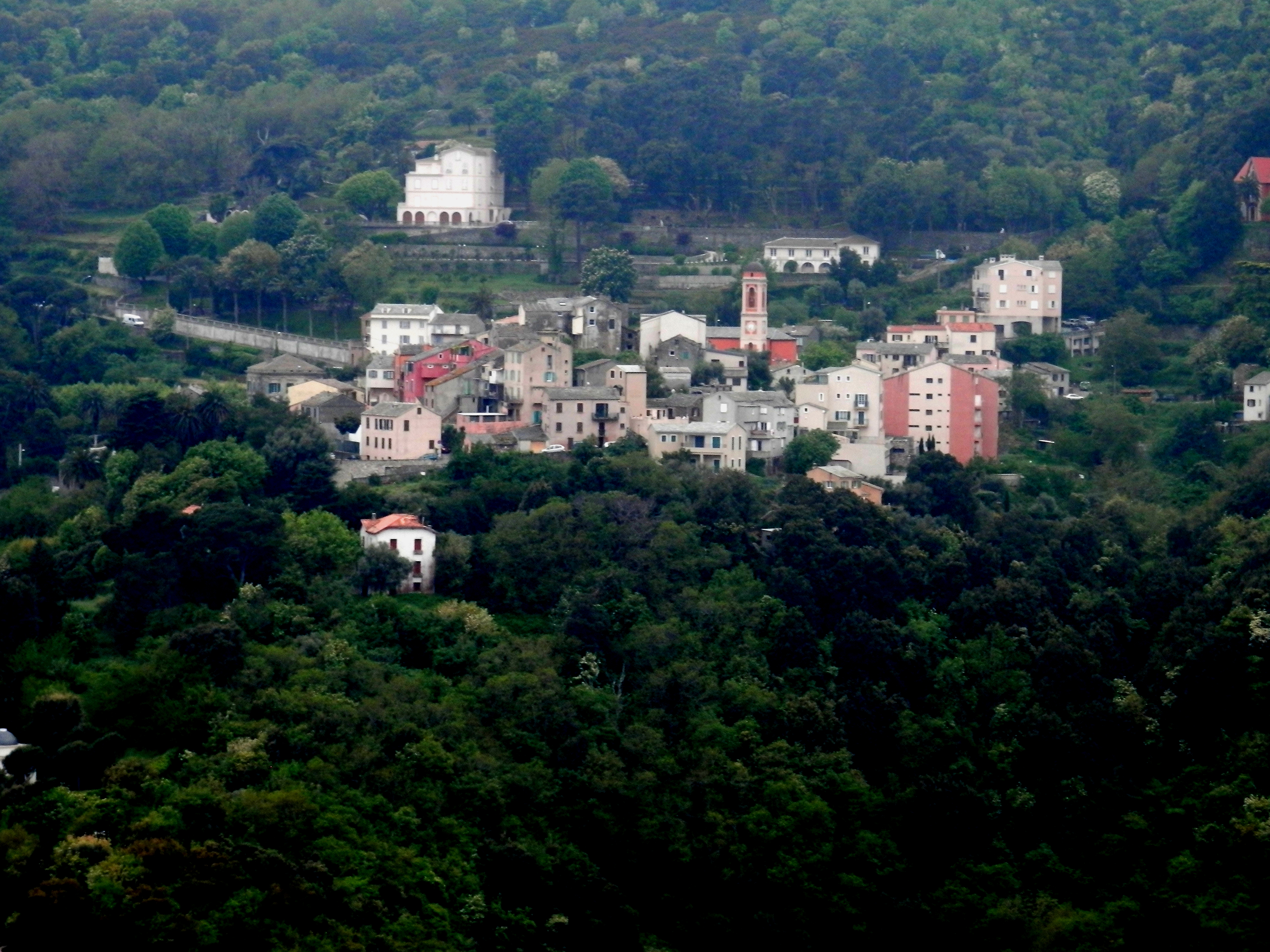
The Village of Cardo

Bastia has several hamlets and districts that are, from north to south:

- Cardo: a village northeast of the city, Cardo was one of the first inhabited places in the area.
- Le Fango: an area which has developed recently on the mountainside. It includes in particular the prefecture of Haute-Corse, Bastia railway station, and the Lycée Giocante de Casabianca.
- Gradiccia
- Saint Antoine
- Fort Lacroix
- La Citadelle
- Saint Joseph
- Monserato
- Lupino: a district south of the city, the first to be developed mainly with social housing.
- Paese Novo: a residential district overlooking Montesoro on the old "Imperial road" that bypasses the town via the heights. Bastia Hospital is in this district.
- Montesoro: another residential district south of Bastia. It has large groups of new buildings with many shops. Montesoro also has large schools: technical and vocational schools, and a secondary education college.
- Erbajolo: another district at the southern end of town. It marks the beginning of the industrial zone south of Bastia agglomeration. It has the largest commercial area in the city (Hyper U) and a football stadium.

== Economy ==
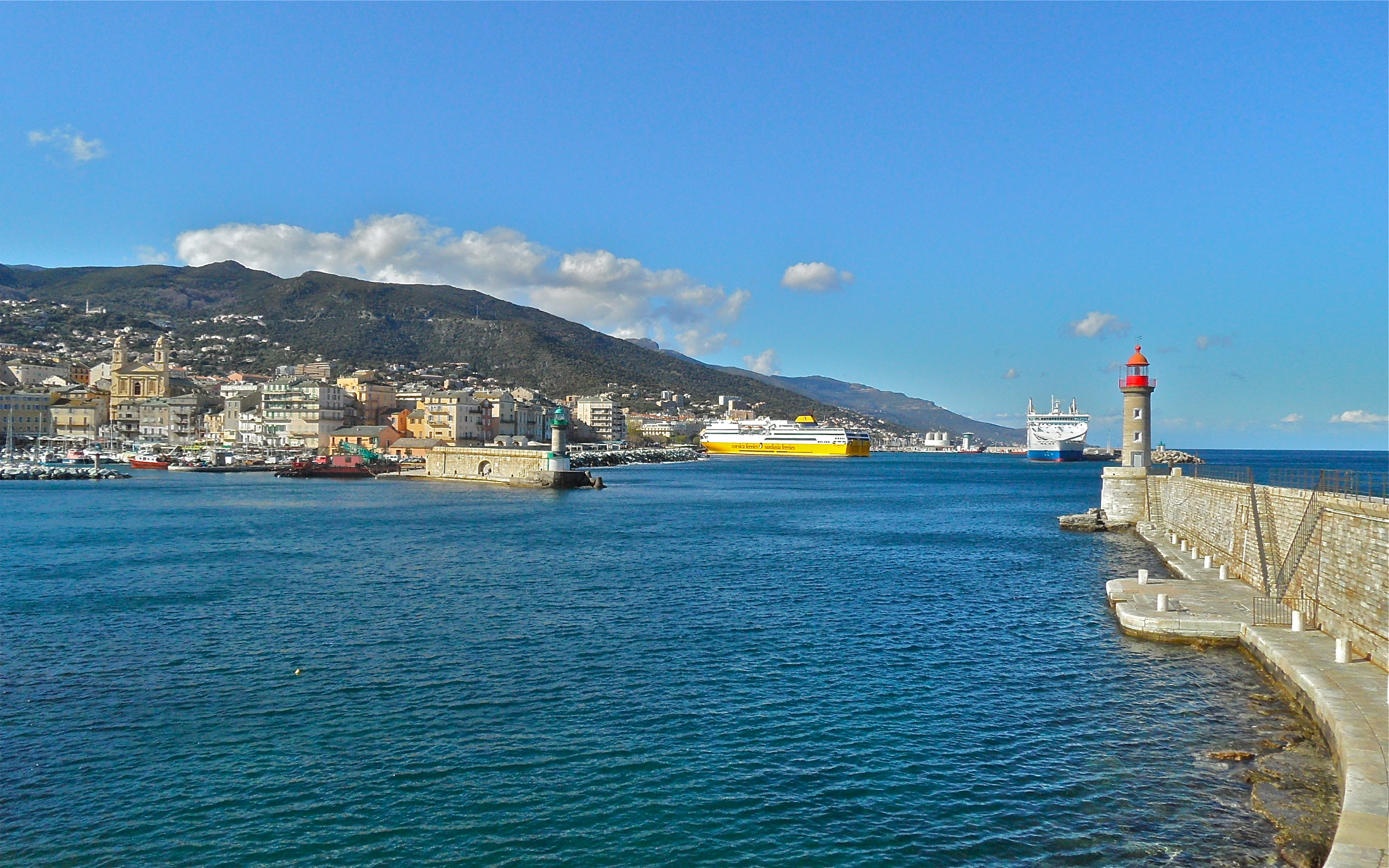
The entry to the old port with the commercial port behind

The bastiaise agglomeration contains most of the few industries that exist in Corsica. However, the unemployment rate in the commune has persistently been one of the highest in France, standing at over 20% in 2004. Bastia is the seat of the Chamber of Commerce and Industry of Bastia and Upper Corsica.

In the Bastia region the Chamber of Commerce and Industry manages the following facilities:

- Bastia Commercial Port: the port can accommodate eight large vessels (6 passenger ships and two others) simultaneously as well as pilot boats and tugs. It is the second largest port in France in terms of passenger traffic after Calais.
- Bastia – Poretta Airport is south of Bastia agglomeration, in the communes of Borgo and Lucciana.

== Culture and heritage ==
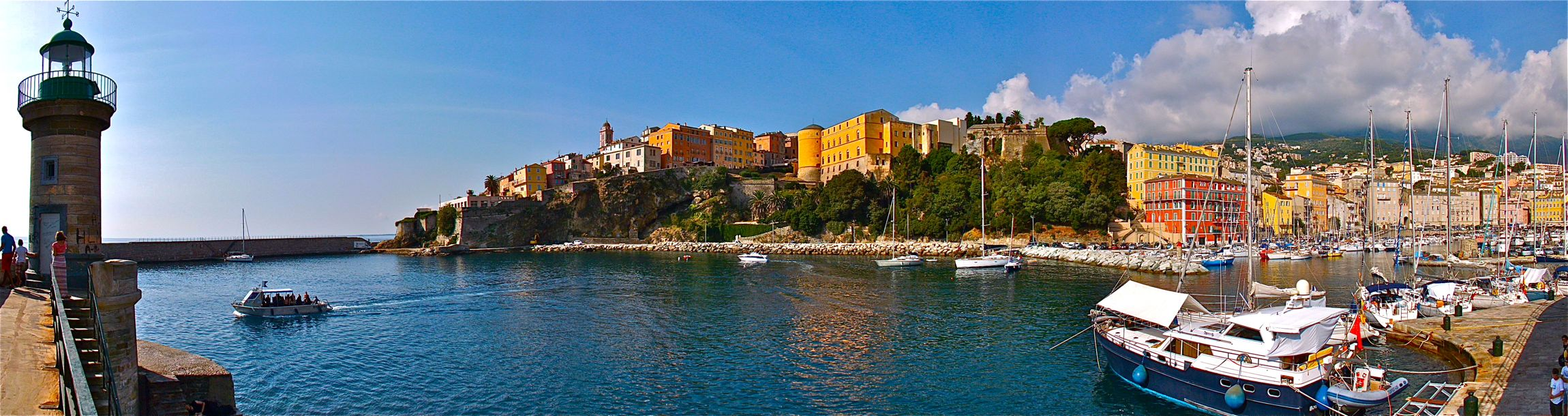
View from the Old Port

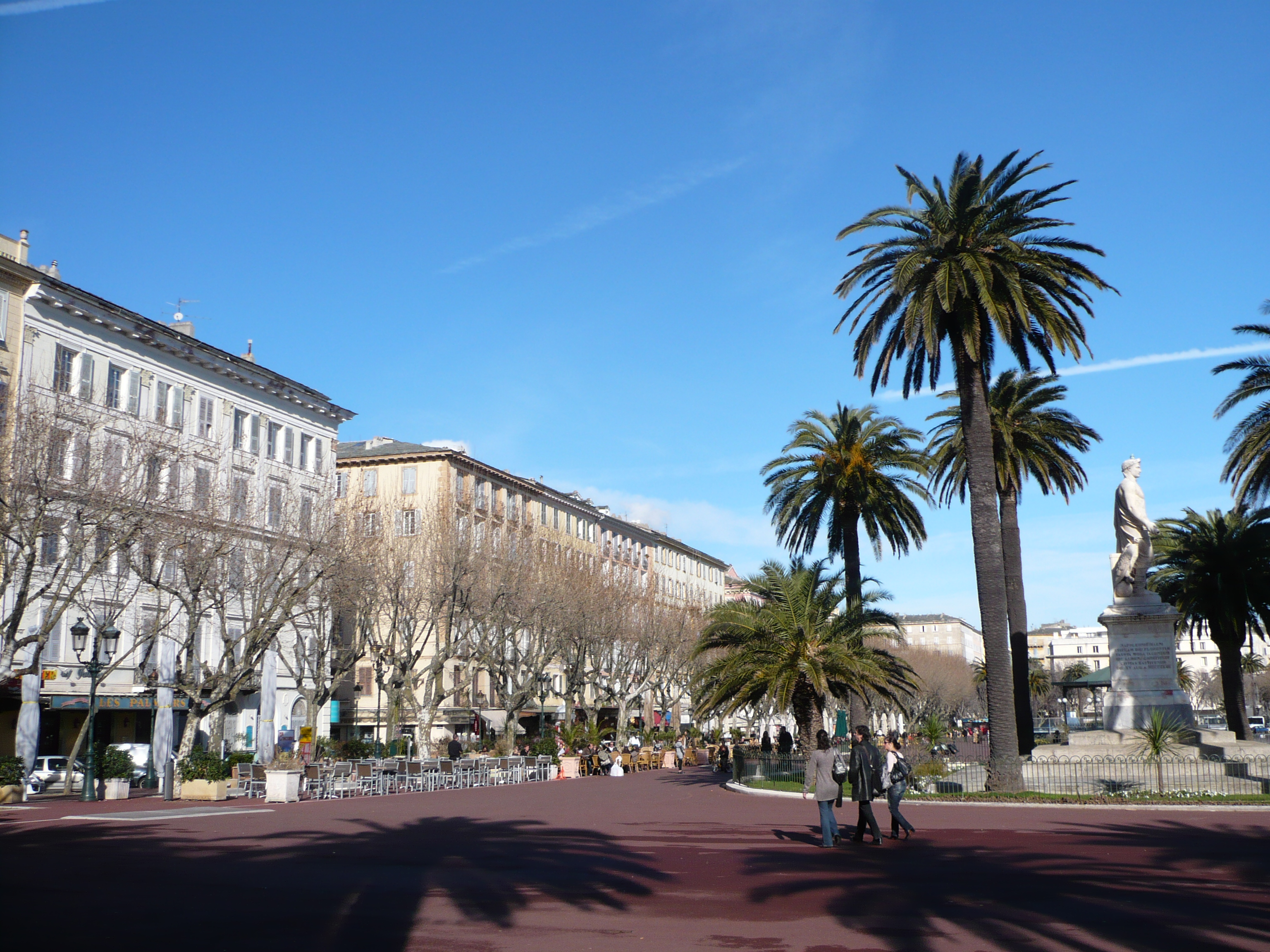
The Place Saint-Nicolas.

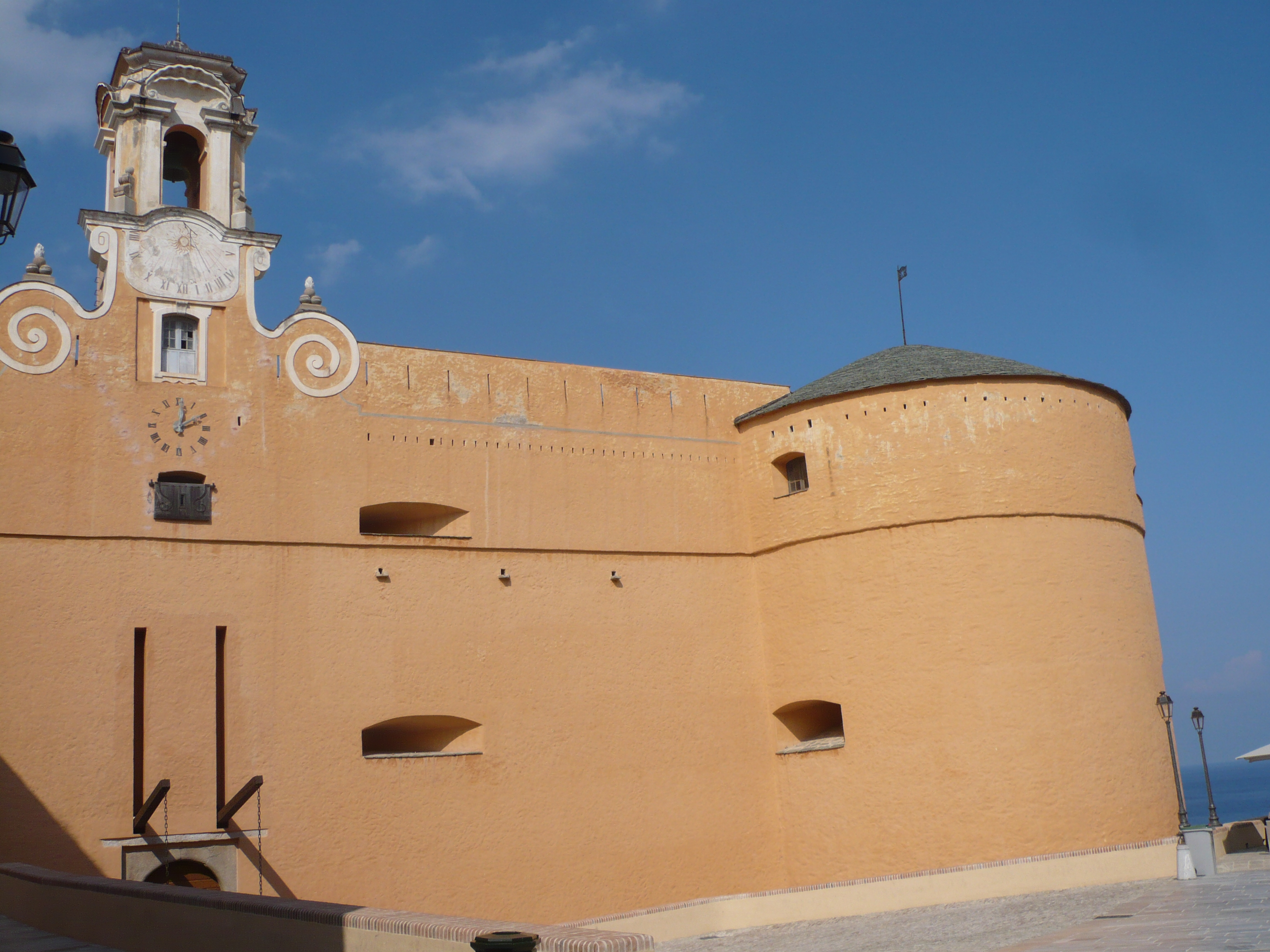
The Palace of Governors.

=== Civil heritage ===
The commune has a large number of buildings and sites that are registered as historical monuments:

- The Romieu Public Garden (1874)
- The Joan of Arc Garden
- The Law Courts (1856)
- The Old Town Hall Garden (19th century)
- The Villayet Saint-Dominique Garden (19th century)
- The Saint-Antoine Convent Garden (19th century)
- The Napoleon Monument (1813)
- The Donati Pleasure Garden
- The Providence Garden (19th century)
- The Flach Garden (19th century)
- The Bon Pasteur Courtyard Garden
- The Villa Fumarolli Pleasure Garden (19th century)
- The Sainte-Victoire Public Garden
- The Maison Castagnola (17th century)
- The Maison de Caraffa (17th century)
- The Governor's Citadel and Palace (14th century) The former palace of the Genoese governors houses the municipal museum, formerly the Ethnology Museum of Corsica. Abutting the old fortress tower and decorated with a 14th-century campanile, the Palace of Governors over the centuries guarded Terra Nova and beyond the ramparts of the Old Port. The city has undertaken a program of renovation of the palace under the direction of architects Cléris Daniel and Jean-Michel Daubourg. Besides the renovation of the palace the work helped to rebuild the part of the monument that was destroyed in 1943 during the fighting for the liberation of Corsica. The new museum was inaugurated in June 2010. The museum collections are organized into four themes: birth and urban growth, centre of power, cultural centre, and the Palace of Governors. The turret of the submarine Casabianca was preserved in the courtyard until the renovations.
- The Mattei Terraces
- The Villa Lota Garden (20th century)
- The Cardo Cemetery Garden (20th century)
- The German Cemetery Garden (20th century)
- The Bosquet Pecunia Green Area
- A Foundry (1870)
- The Cardo Copper Mine (1868)
- The Toga Iron Works (1842)

=== Religious heritage ===
The commune has many religious buildings and sites that are registered as historical monuments:

- The Old Church at Cardo (13th century)
- The Church of Saint Charles (1612)
- The Church or Oratory of Saint Roch (1604)
- The Parish Centre of Notre-Dame des Victoires (20th century)
- The Church of Notre-Dame de Montserato (18th century)
- The Church of Saint-Étienne de Cardo (1838)
- The Church of Sainte-Marie (17th century) a former Cathedral built in 1495 but heavily remodeled in the early 17th century, is in the heart of the citadel.
- The Church of Saint-Croix (18th century)
- The Church of Saint John the Baptist (1636), one of the most emblematic monuments of the city of Bastia. Overlooking the Old Port, it was built from 1583 but experienced many additional worksjobs through the ages. It features a high classical façade, largely hidden by neighbouring buildings and a baroque interior from the 18th century.
- The Church of the Conception (1611)

The churches contain a very large number of items which are registered as historical objects. In total (including civil heritage) there are more than 200 historical objects in Bastia.

=== Gastronomy ===
Some culinary specialties from Bastia and its region:

- Sardines au brocciu: fresh sardines stuffed with Brocciu cheese made from sheep milk;
- Baccalà: from cod; this dish was long considered the dish of the poor in Corsica because its price was affordable and it kept easily due to being heavily salted.

=== Films made in Bastia ===
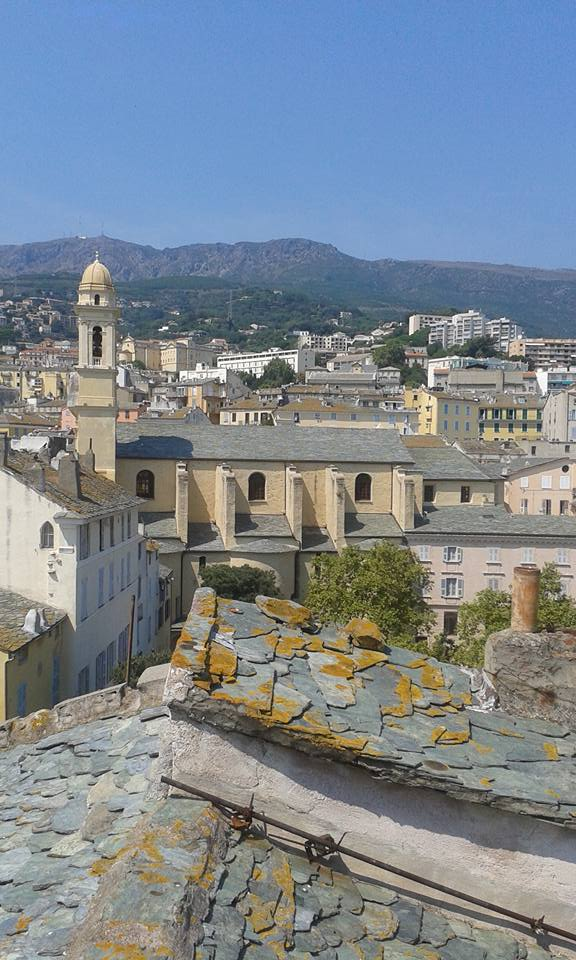
View over the rooftops of Bastia

- Cela s'appelle l'aurore, French-Italian film by Luis Buñuel in 1955.
- Rosebud, American film by Otto Preminger in 1975.
- Forza Bastia, French documentary by Jacques Tati and Sophie Tatischeff in 1978.
- Les Déracinés, French television film by Jacques Renard broadcast in 2000.
- L'Enquête Corse, French film by Alain Berbérian in 2004.
- The Man from London, British-German-Hungarian film by Béla Tarr based on a novel by Georges Simenon.
- Mafiosa, French television series filmed mainly around Bastia and in Haute-Corse during the third season.

== Notable people ==
- Romain Achilli (born 1993), footballer
- Jean-Félix Acquaviva (born 1973), politician
- Dominique Agostini (born 1989), footballer
- Hugo Aine (born 1995), footballer
- Louis Ferdinand Antoni (1872–1940), painter and sculptor
- Benjamin Basteres (born 1984), rugby union player
- Jean Bastia (1919–2005), film director, screenwriter and film producer
- Léo Battesti (born 1953), politician and chess enthusiast
- Chaouki Ben Saada (born 1984), footballer
- Vincent Benedetti (1817–1900), diplomat, main architect of the declaration of the Franco-Prussian War of 1870.
- Patrick Beneforti (born 1980), footballer
- Julien Benhaim (born 1996), footballer
- John Bernard (1893–1983), American politician, representing Minnesota in the House of Representatives
- Pierre Bianconi (born 1962), footballer
- Gian Paolo Borghetti (1816–1897), writer, poet and politician
- Victor Bourret (1877–1949), general and military administrator
- Eva Colas (born 1996), model and beauty pageant titleholder
- Juan Bertoli Calderoni (1820–1885), architect
- Pascal Camadini (born 1972), footballer
- Pierre Campana (born 1985), rally driver
- César Campinchi (1882–1941), lawyer, minister and French man of state, Minister of Marine and Minister in the Daladier and Reynaud governments in 1939 and 1940.
- Louis Capazza (1862–1928), bassoonist
- Jean-Luc Carbuccia (1808–1854), general and archaeologist
- Michel Castellani (born 1945), politician
- Charles Ceccaldi-Raynaud (1925–2019), lawyer and politician
- Antoine Cervetti (born 1961), footballer
- Gilles Cioni (born 1984), footballer
- Paul-André Colombani (born 1967), politician
- Gary Coulibaly (born 1986), footballer
- Jacques Cristofari (born 1978), footballer
- Clothilde de Bernardi (born 1994), tennis player
- Paul de Casabianca (1839–1916), lawyer and politician
- Jean-Marie De Zerbi (born 1959), footballer
- John Filippi (born 1995), racing driver
- Rino Corso Fougier (1894–1963), general of the Italian Royal Air Force
- Jean Baptiste, baron Franceschi, (1766–1813), general
- Christophe Gaffory (born 1988), footballer
- Baptiste Giabiconi (born 1989), male model and pop singer
- Matthieu Gianni (born 1985), footballer
- Jean César Graziani (1859–1932), army general
- Paul-André Guérin (born 1997), footballer
- Pierre Huard (1901–1983), professor of medicine
- Tilly Key (born 1984), singer
- Jean-Christophe Lamberti (born 1982), footballer
- André Lanata (born 1961), fighter pilot and Chief of Staff of the French Air Force
- Jean-Louis Leca (born 1985), footballer
- Louis Leschi (1893–1954), historian
- Cécile Lignot-Maubert (born 1971), hammer thrower
- Anthony Lippini (born 1988), footballer
- Laurent Lokoli (born 1994), tennis player
- Grégory Lorenzi (born 1983), footballer
- Pierre-Louis Loubet (born 1997), rally driver
- José Luccioni (1903–1978), operatic tenor singer
- Julien Maggiotti (born 1995, footballer
- Jean-Jacques Mandrichi (born 1984), footballer
- Gérard Mannoni (1928–2020), sculptor
- Henri Martelli (1895–1980), composer
- Franck Matelli (born 1991), racing driver
- Marc'Andria Maurizzi (born 2007), chess grandmaster
- François Modesto (born 1978), footballer
- Michel Moretti (born 1989), football manager and former player
- Xavier Musca (born 1960), economist
- Henry Padovani (born 1952), first guitarist of the musical group The Police
- Olivier Pantaloni (born 1966), football manager and former player
- José Pasqualetti (born 1956), footballer
- Henriette Perrin-Duportal (1869–1938), French writer, historian, author of children's books and school textbooks
- Guillaume Pianelli (born 1998), footballer
- François Piétri (1882–1966), politician
- Louis Poggi (born 1984), footballer
- Henriette Puig-Roget (1910–1992), pianist and organist
- Ottaviano Raggi (1592–1643), Catholic cardinal
- Mehdi Rahmouni (born 1988), assistant football referee
- Adil Rami (born 1985), footballer
- Marie Reynoard (1897–1945), member of French resistance
- Angelo Rinaldi (born 1940), novelist and literary critic
- Jean-Jacques Rocchi (born 1989), footballer
- Bruno Rodriguez (born 1972), footballer
- Julien Romain (born 1996), footballer
- Anthony Roncaglia (born 2000), footballer
- Stéphane Rossi (born 1964), football manager and former player
- Anthony Salis (born 1988), footballer
- Benjamin Santelli (born 1991), footballer
- Vincent Seatelli (born 1971), footballer
- Gilles Simeoni (born 1967), lawyer and politician
- Owen Simonin (born 1997), entrepreneur and influencer
- Patrice Sorbara (born 1985), footballer
- Domenico Maria Spinola (1666–1743), Doge of the Republic of Genoa and king of Corsica.
- Paul Squaglia (born 1964), footballer
- Pierre Tardi (1897–1972), geophysicist, astronomer, and geographer
- Jean Joseph Valéry (1828–1879), shipowner and politician
- César Vezzani (1888–1951), one of the most famous singers of the 20th century. "Emperor of Tenors" according to Tsar Nicolas II.
- Michele Viale-Prelà (1798–1860), Catholic priest
- Paul Vincensini (1896–1978), mathematician
- Thomas Vincensini (born 1993), footballer
- Émile Zuccarelli (born 1940), politician

== See also ==
- Gang de la Brise de Mer – one of the most powerful Corsican mafia organisations
- SC Bastia – football club
- Railway stations in Corsica

== Bibliography ==
- Corsica – and its Romanesque chapels, Stéphane Massiani, May 1991, A. Robert, 13011 Marseille, Bastia: Chapelle San Sarorio, p. 45 (in French)
- Dictionary of Chateaux and Fortifications of France in the Middle Ages, éditions Publitotal, Charles-Laurent Salch, 1978, reprint 1991, Strasbourg, 1287 pages, ISBN 2-86535-070-3, p. 109 : Bastia: City Walls of "Terra Nova" (in French)
- Power and Fortifications in the north of Corsica 11th – 14th century, éditions Alain Piazzola, Daniel Istria, May 2005, Ajaccio, ISBN 2-915410-14-3 (in French)
