= Canton of Bastia-4 =

Coordinates: 42.67°N 9.44°E

The Canton of Bastia-4 is one of the 15 cantons of the Haute-Corse department, France. Since the French canton reorganisation which came into effect in March 2015, the communes of the canton of Bastia-4 are:

- Bastia (partly)
- Furiani
