= Laurent Boyer =

French radio and television host

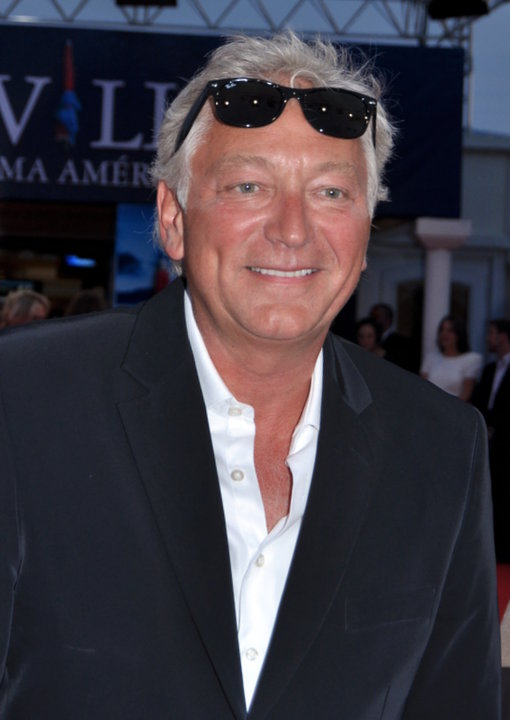
- Laurent Boyer in 2010
- Born: 23 January 1958 (age 67); Paris, France
- Occupation: Television presenter

Laurent Boyer (born on 23 January 1958 in Paris) is a French radio and television host. He is the companion of singer Alice Dona.

He worked on M6 since its creation and presented programs such as Graines de star, Nos meilleurs Moments, Jour J and Fréquenstar.

On radio, Laurent Boyer was a host on Kiss Fm, 95.2, and Europe 1 (C'est pour rire, Top 50, Espace Rêve...) and Europe 2 (Le Brunch...). He currently hosts the show Tête dans les étoiles on RTL in which he daily receives a celebrity. He also appeared, playing his own role in the H sitcom, episode 18, season 2.

On 14 April 2005, he had a serious road accident, but survived.
