= Benjamin Basteres =

French rugby union player

Benjamin Bastères (also known as Benji), born 9 December 1984 in Bastia (Corsica), is a French rugby union player who plays as left prop for RC Toulonnais (1.83 m, 105 kg).

== Career ==
- Until 2001 : Bastia
- Since 2001 : RC Toulon

== Honours ==
- Pro D2 Champions : 2005, 2008
- Semi-finalist of Championnat de France Espoirs : 2006
- Championnat de France Reichel Finalist: 2005
