= Tilly Key =

Tilly Key, born Latissia Pizano, is an R&B/pop singer from the Island of Corsica. She currently lives in Los Angeles, California.

== Biography ==
Tilly Key was born Latissia Pizano in Bastia, Corsica, March 1, 1984.

Key started singing at age six and gained recognition in France. She released seven records in Europe, frequently accompanying herself on guitar, piano, and percussion. Her music styles vary between pop, soul and R&B.

After moving to the United States in 2003, Key worked with Jimmy Jam and Terry Lewis to produce a single for the Hotel Rwanda soundtrack album. Both film and soundtrack were nominated for awards at the Oscars, World Soundtrack Awards, and Golden Globes in 2005.

In 2004 Key released a single in Europe "Hot vibes baby" feat French artists, Tragedie, Calvin Scott and STill.

In 2005 Key toured the US with 13 piece live band for album "Tilly Key".

In 2009 Key signed a record contract with Mayweather Music, record label from Boxer Floyd Mayweather. Key releases a singled "Higher".

She re-recorded Jealous of My Boogie by RuPaul in 2010. Dubbed "J.O.M.B. 2.0" off the remix album "Drag Race".

In 2010, Key participated in Usher's "Mon Star" in a song produced by Jimmy Jam & Terry Lewis and written by singer Miguel.

From 2011 to 2013, Key participated in the production and writing of many French and US artists as well as writing for her next album.

More recently, she was working at Subliminal studios with songwriter and producer London Taylor.

== Personal life ==
In February 2014, Columbus Short's ex-wife, Tanee McCall-Short, assaulted Key, "pounding on her", in which Key "suffered a concussion, a cervical sprain, multiple contusions, a lumbar strain, and a lumbar sprain." Key said that McCall-Short also threatened her, "I'm gonna slit your throat, I'm gonna kill you, gonna break your neck"; Short recorded the battery on video but didn't intervene in the attack.

== Discography ==
singles:
1993: "Je veux m'envoler"

1994: "Mama"

1996: "Histoire d'oser" Polygramm

1997: "Exces" Polygramm

1998: "Juste pour une nuit" E.M.I

2000: L'ombre et LA lumiere Sony/M6

2001: "Ou que j'aille" Sony/M6

2004: "Hot vibes baby" WARNER UP MUSIC

2005: "Somebody Special" KINDRED ENT.

2006: "In his hands" KINDRED ENT.

2009: "higher" MAYWEATHER MUSIC

2010: "J.O.M.B.2" (featuring Rupaul)

2012: "2day" (featuring Shawn Stackz)

=== Albums ===
2005: Tilly Key (Kindred Entertainment)

2010: participation in Usher's album "Mon Star"

2010: participation in Rupaul's album Drag Race

=== Soundtrack contributions ===
2005: Hotel Rwanda Original Soundtrack: "Ne Me Laisse Pas Seule Ici (Don't Leave Me Here by Myself)"
