= Église Sainte-Croix de Bastia =

Church in Haute-Corse, France

Coordinates: 42°41′33″N 9°27′08″E

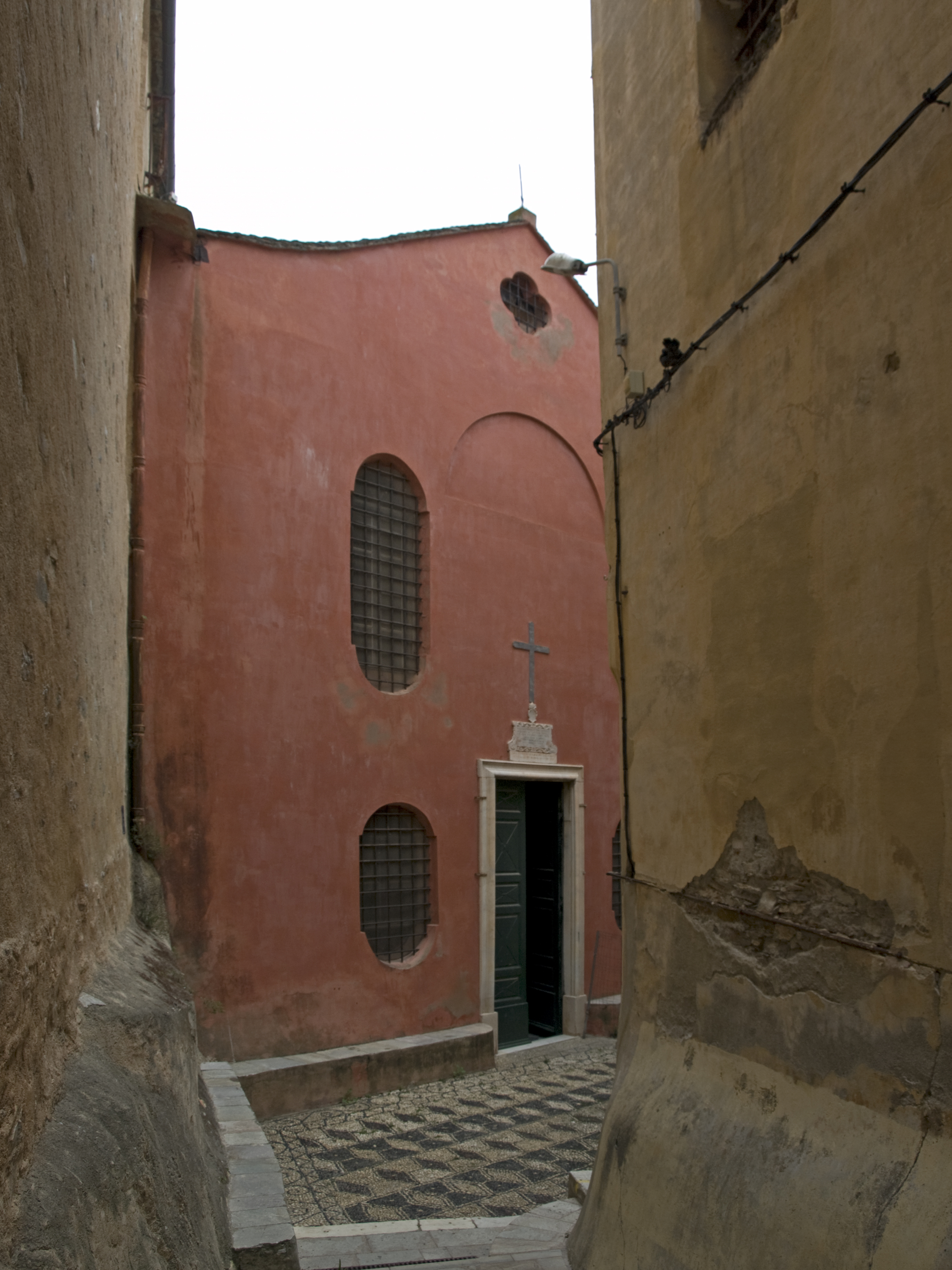
The southern portal

Église Sainte-Croix de Bastia (Oratoire de la Confrerie de Sainte Croix) is a Catholic church in Bastia, Haute-Corse, Corsica. The building was classified as a Historic Monument in 1931. The church is located in the citadel of Bastia (Terra-Nova), in the historic center of the city, next to the Church of the Assumption of St. Mary.

The church was founded in 1542 to host the statue of the Black Christ, found in the sea by fishermen. Most of the current building originates in the 18th century. Only the interior of the church is protected.
