= Beppe Croce =

Italian sailor (1914–1986)

Andrea Giuseppe Croce
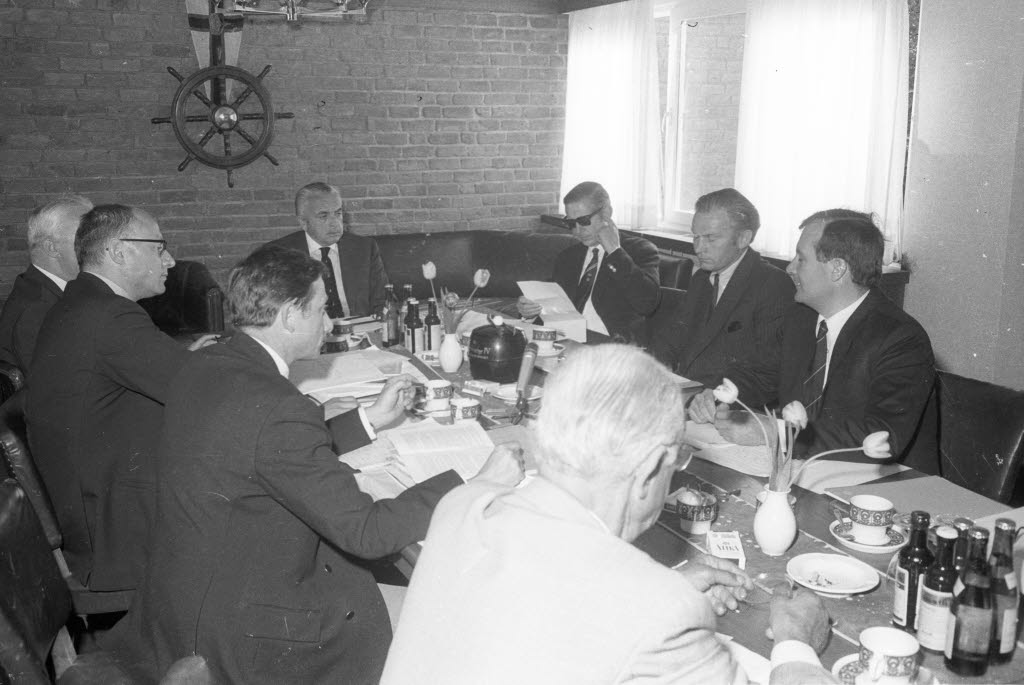
- Beppe Croce chairing a meeting in Kiel on sailing at the 1972 Summer Olympics
- Born: 11 December 1914; Genoa, Italy
- Died: 16 September 1986 (aged 71); Portofino, Italy
- Occupations: Sailor, yachtsman
- Spouse: Countess Umberta Raggio (before 1986)
- Children: Luigi, Carlo, and Manuela
- Military career
- Allegiance: Italy

Andrea Giuseppe "Beppe" Croce (11 December 1914 – 16 September 1986) was an Italian sailor and yachtsman from Genoa.

== Biography ==
In 1939, Croce won the Italian University Star Class championship. He also won the 1969 5.50 class Italian Championship on Lake Garda, where three years earlier he had won the Centomiglia regatta (finished by only three out of fifty participant boats, due to very severe weather conditions).

Beppe served as an army officer during World War II. After the 1943 armistice, he remained faithful to the King Vittorio Emanuele III and fought the Nazis as a liberal partisan.

From 1946 to 1980, Beppe served as president of Lloyd Italico, an insurance company founded by his grandfather.

Croce also competed in the 6 metre class at the 1948 Summer Olympics and contributed organizing the 1960 Naples sailing Olympics as the president of the Olympic Committee.

In 1952, together with his friend René Levainville, Croce founded the famous Giraglia Cup, a regatta between St. Tropez and Genova organized by the Yacht Club Italiano in collaboration with the Yacht Club de France, which nowadays involves hundreds of sailors and maxi yachts.

Croce also played a key role in the organization of the 1982 Azzurra America's Cup Challenge, the first Italian America's Cup challenge. Financed by his friend and former Fiat president, Gianni Agnelli, the boat competed under the patronage of the Yacht Club Costa Smeralda.

From 1969 to his death in 1986, Croce was the first non-British president of the International Sailing Federation. Croce was also the president of the Italian Sailing Federation (Federazione Italiana Vela) from 1957 to 1981, and of the Yacht Club Italiano from 1958 to 1986. He was also the longtime vice president of the Comitato Olimpico Nazionale Italiano (CONI).

In memory of Beppe Croce, since 1989, the International Sailing Federation annually awards its ISAF Beppe Croce Trophy to an individual who has made an outstanding voluntary contribution to the sport of sailing.

During his life, Croce assembled a unique collection of Yacht Portrait Paintings from 1800, which adorned the walls of his house in Portofino, where he also owned the Hotel Splendido. His family later donated to the Galata Museo del Mare more than 100 paintings from such collection, which are now permanently displayed at the museum's Beppe Croce Gallery.

=== Personal life ===
Married to Countess Umberta Raggio, Croce had three sons, Luigi, Carlo and Manuela and several grandsons and great-grandsons.

Following in his father's footsteps, Beppe's son Carlo has been President of the ISAF - International Sailing Federation from 2013 to 2016, of the Fiv - Italian Sailing Federation from 2009 to 2016. He was President of the Yacht Club Italiano (since 1997).
