= Acqua Tignese =

Stream in the Haute-Corse department of Corsica

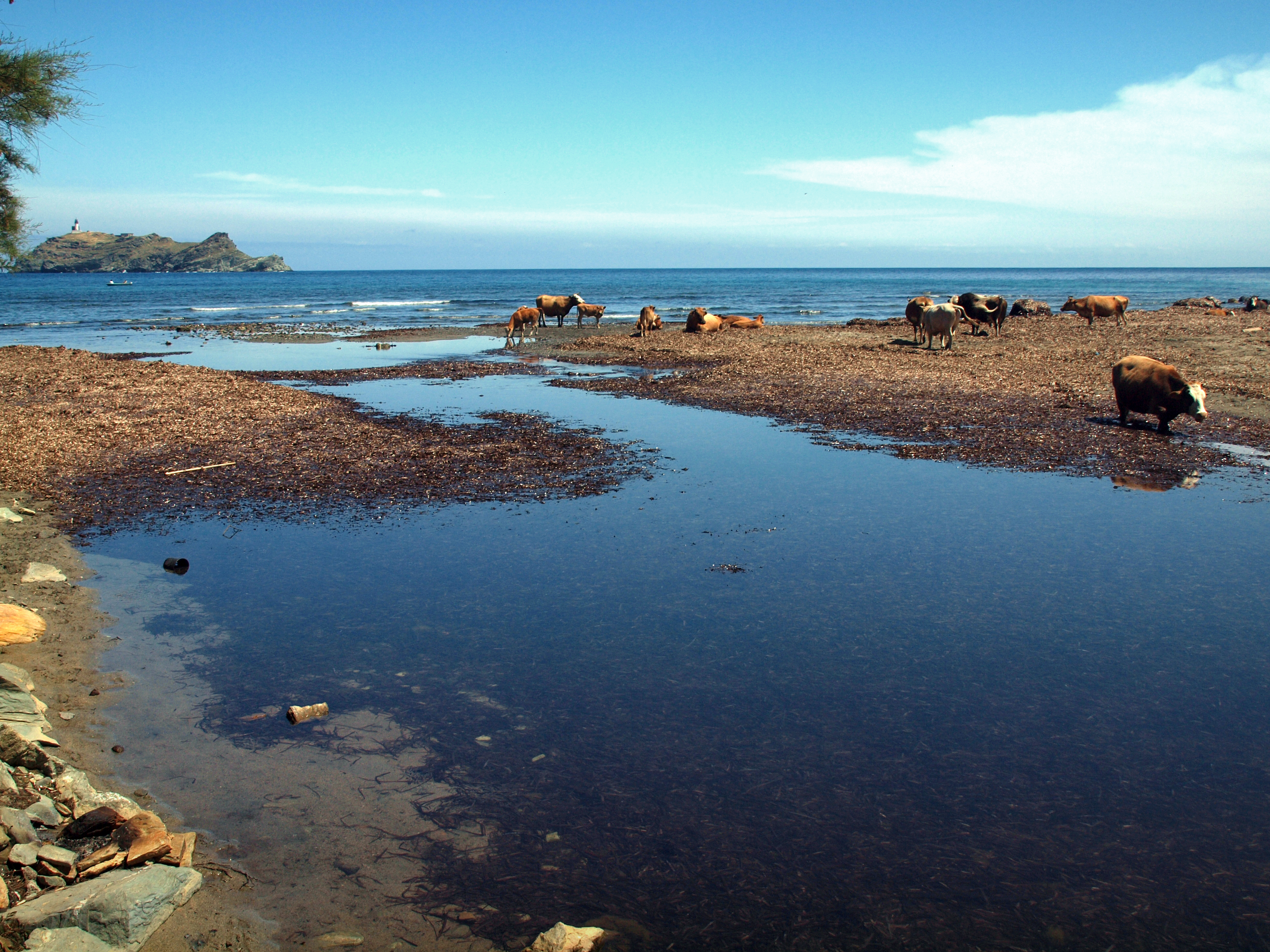
- Mouth of the Acqua Tignese

- Location within Corsica

Location
- Country: France
- Region: Corsica
- Department: Haute-Corse
- Canton: Capobianco

Physical characteristics
- Source: Monte di e Castelle
  - location: Rogliano
  - coordinates: 42°56′45″N 9°23′41″E
  - elevation: 500 metres (1,600 ft)
- Mouth: Ligurian Sea
  - location: between Rogliano and Ersa
  - coordinates: 43°00′20″N 9°24′17″E
  - elevation: 0 metres (0 ft)
- Length: 9 kilometres (5.6 mi)

The Acqua Tignese is a stream in the Haute-Corse department of the Corsica region that has its mouth north of Cap Corse, in the Ligurian Sea.

== Geography ==
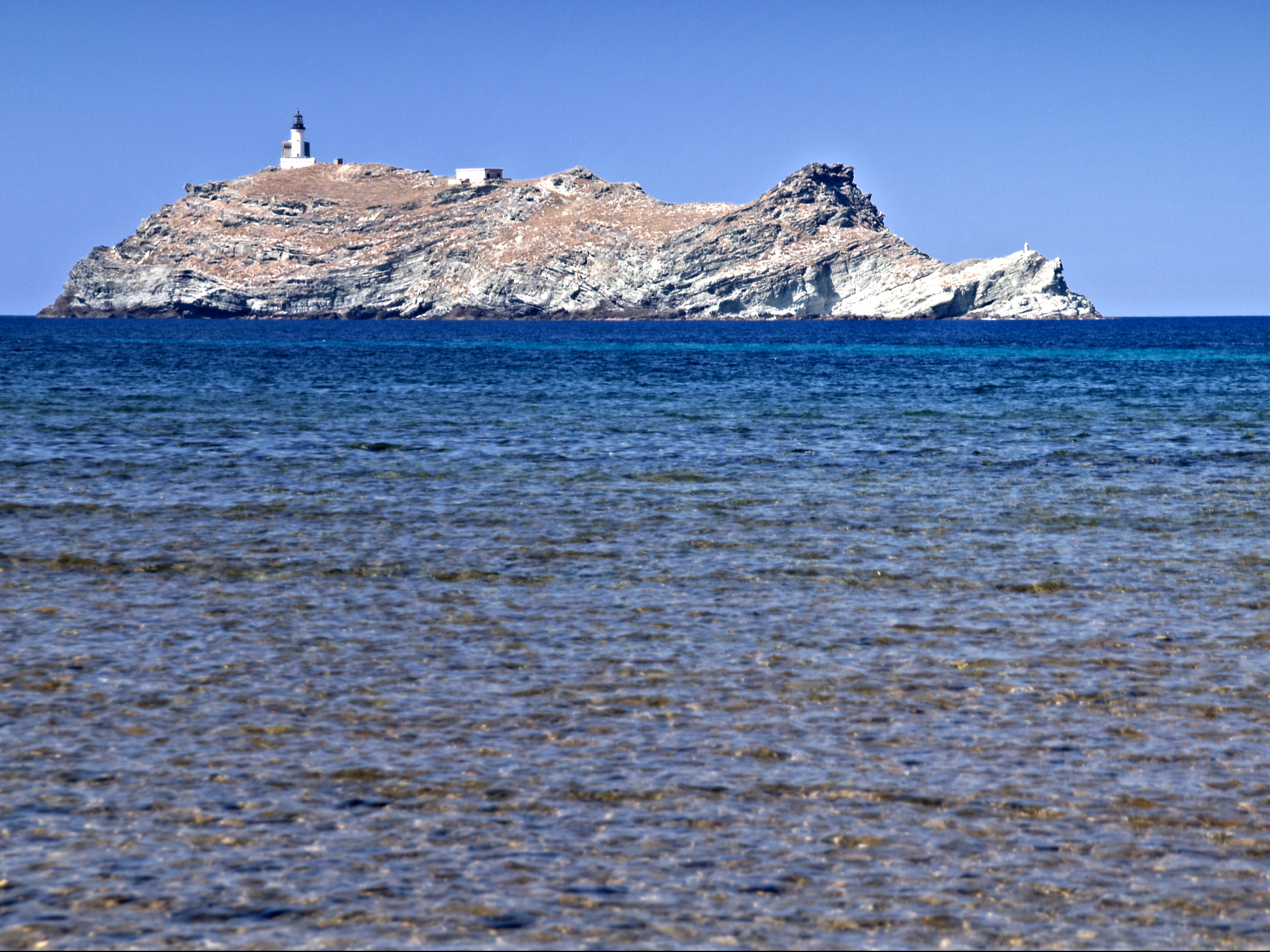
The island of Giraglia opposite the river mouth to the north of Cap Corse

The Acqua Tignese has a length of 9 kilometres (5.6 mi). It has its source in the municipality of Rogliano at an altitude of 500 metres (1,600 ft). The source is 200 meters west of Monte di e Castelle (602 metres (1,975 ft) high).

The river flows generally from the south to the north of Cap Corse.

It has its mouth on the Ligurian Sea between the municipalities of Ersa and Rogliano. Its mouth is between the port of Barcaggio to the west and the beach of Cala to the east, opposite the island of Giraglia.

The neighboring rivers are to the south, the Luri.

== Communes and cantons crossed ==
The Acqua Tignese crosses four communes in the Haute-Corse department. From upstream to downstream they are Rogliano (source), Morsiglia, Centuri and Ersa (mouth). The Acqua Tignese flows entirely within the former canton of Capobianco in the arrondissement of Bastia.

== Watershed ==
The area of the "Coastal stream of Pietracorbara with Granaggilo included" watershed is 113 square kilometres (44 sq mi).

== Managing body ==
The managing body since the Corsican law of 22 January 2002 has been the Corsican Basin Committee (Comité de bassin de Corse).

== Tributaries ==
The Acqua Tignese has no referenced tributaries. The Strahler number is therefore one.

== Hydrology ==
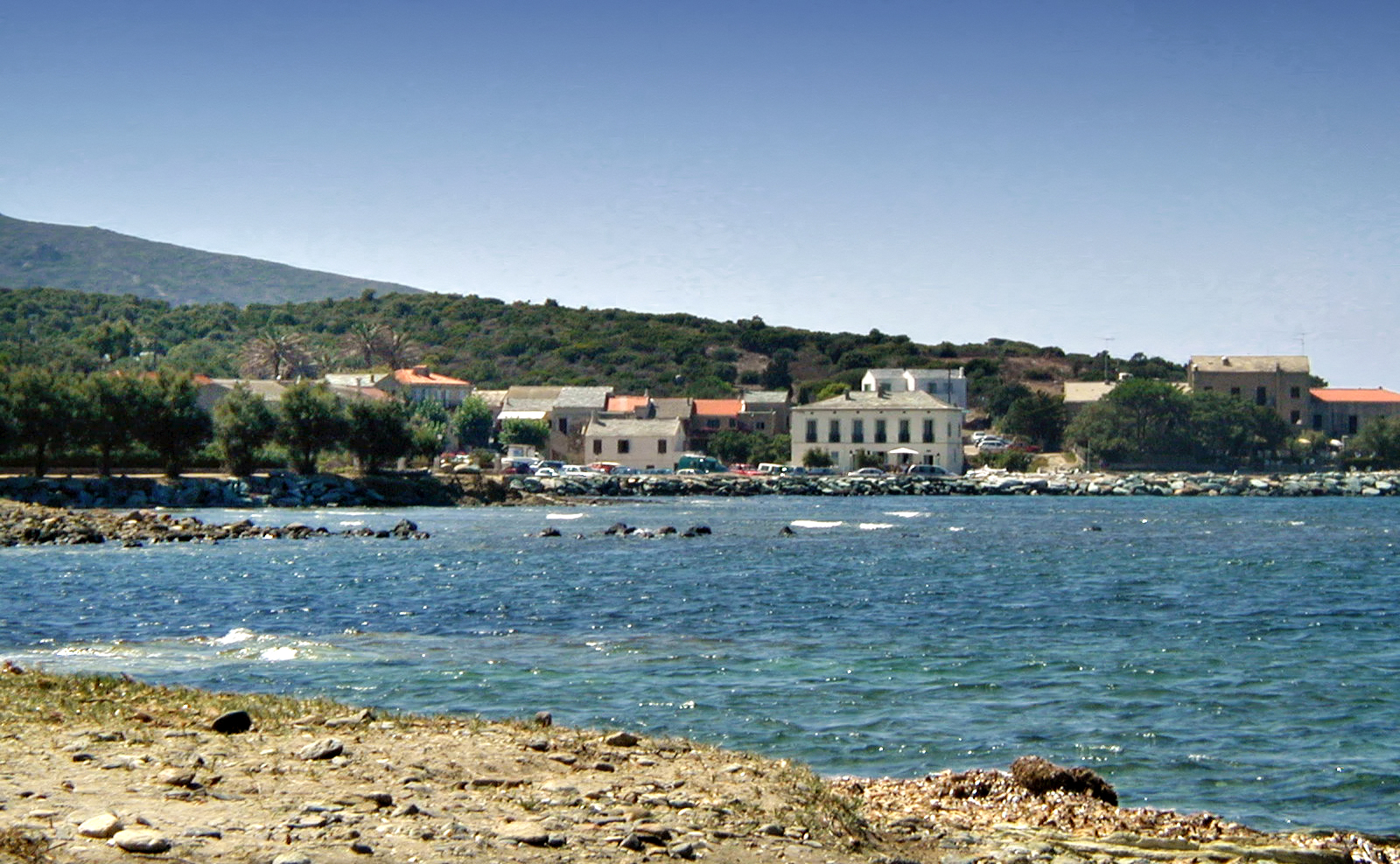
The Acqua Tignese at its mouth, near the port of Barcaggio (Ersa)

An AEP monitoring station in the town of Ersa, at an altitude of 100 metres (330 ft) and a catchment area of 4.9 square kilometres (1.9 sq mi), studied its hydrology from 1979 to 1999. The average flow was 0.032 cubic metres per second (1.1 cu ft/s).

Average flow (cubic meters per second) by month for the period 1979 to 1999
Month	Flow
Jan	0.059
Feb	0.052
Mar	0.053
Apr	0.035
May	0.033
Jun	0.016
Jul	0.007
Aug	0.004
Sep	0.006
Oct	0.015
Nov	0.050
Dec	0.052

At low water the VCN3, or minimum flow rate of the watercourse recorded for three consecutive days in a month, in the case of a five-year dry period is 0.001 cubic metres per second (0.035 cu ft/s) or 1 litre per second (0.035 cu ft/s).

Over this short observation period, the maximum daily flow was observed on 5 November 1993 at 1.21 cubic metres per second (43 cu ft/s). The maximum instantaneous flow was observed at 06:31 on 5 November 1993 at 12.21 cubic metres per second (431 cu ft/s). At that time the maximum instantaneous height was 193 centimetres (76 in).

QIX 2 is 1.8 m3/s, QIX 5 is 3.6 m3/s, QIX 10 is 4.8 m3/s and QIX 20 is 5.9 m3/s.

The rainfall in this part of the river's catchment area is 205 millimetres (8.1 in) per year, which is a third less than French average of 300 millimetres (12 in) per year. The specific flow rate (Qsp) reaches 6.5 liters per second / per square kilometer of basin.

== Human presence ==
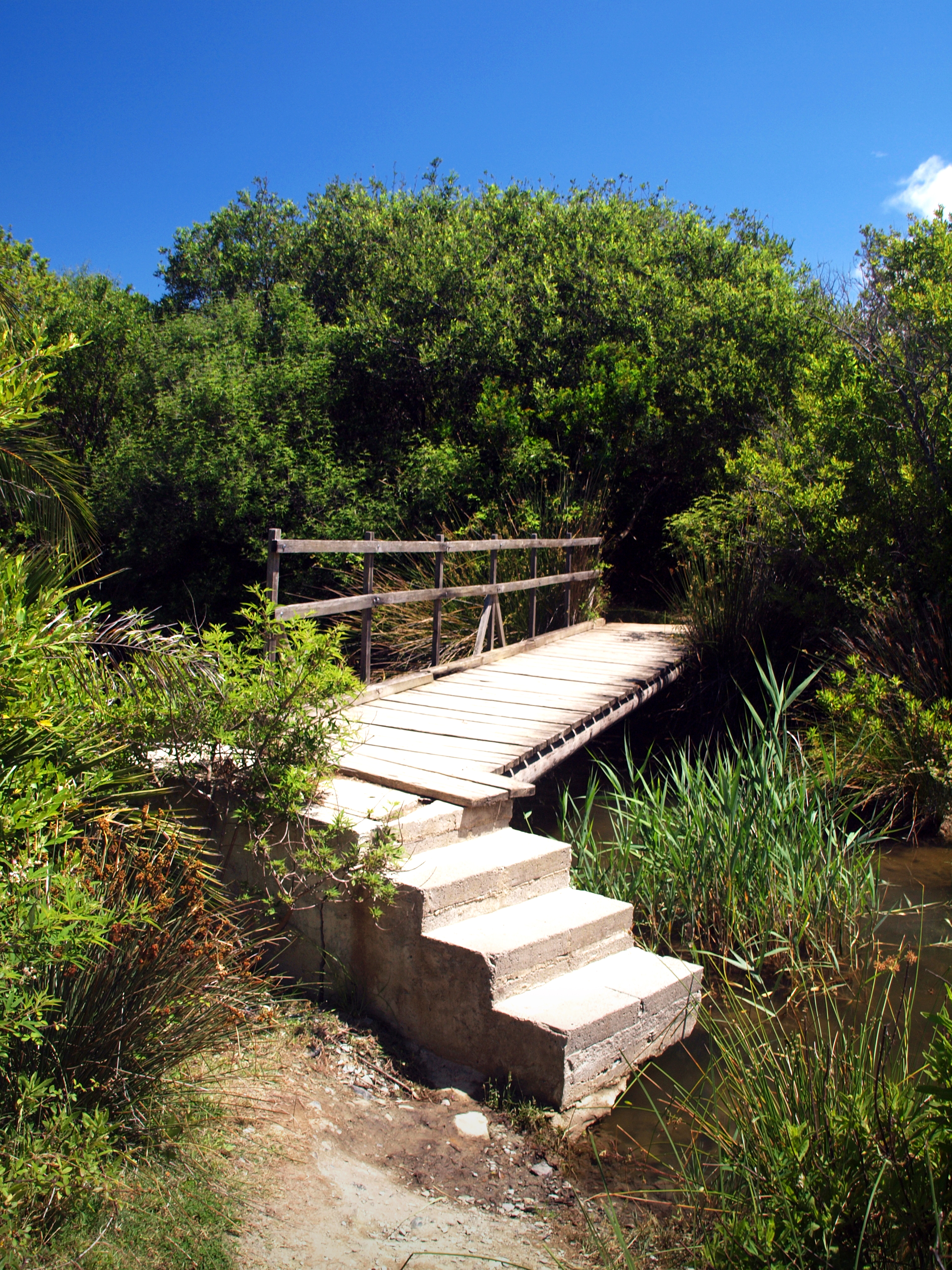
Footbridge near the mouth

Since 1979 there has been a project to build a dam on the Acqua Tignese.

The hydraulic problems of the municipalities of the northern part of Cap Corse being more and more worrying, on 21 July 1988, the Corsican Assembly adopted the motion relating to the construction of the Acqua Tignese dam. The Acqua Tignese, "an undisturbed Mediterranean river (the Corsican brook salamander lives in the Acqua Tignese, would this be the case if the dam had been built?)".

A footbridge crosses the river built about fifty meters from its mouth and is used by hikers along the sentier des douaniers and visitors going to the beach of Cala.

== Ecology ==
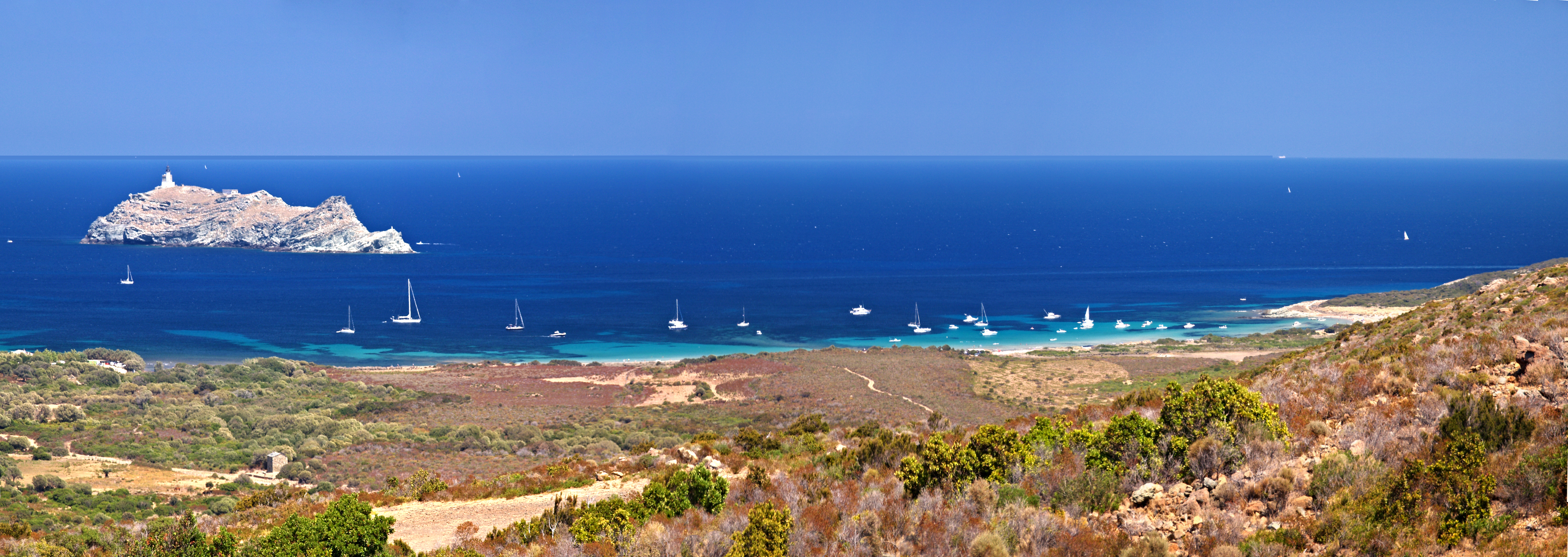
Cala beach

The Pointe du Cap Corse site of the Conservatoire du littoral, managed by the Association Finocchiarola-Pointe du Cap Corse, adjoins a good part of the lower course of the Acqua Tignese, especially near its mouth.

=== Fauna ===
The stagnant, brackish and salty waters of the stream near its mouth are home to many protected animal species, amphibians from the anuran (without a tail) and urodela (with tail) groups: the Corsican fire salamander (Salamandra corsica) marginally present on the coast, and the Corsican brook salamander (Euproctus montanus) which are endemic, the Tyrrhenian painted frog (Discoglossus sardus) and the Sardinian tree frog (Hyla sarda) endemic to Corsica, Sardinia, Capraia and Elbe, the Italian pool frog (Pelophylax bergeri) which is expanding from the Pointe du Cap estuarine marshes into the upper course of the streams, finally the European green toad (Bufotes viridis) of the West Mediterranean which lives mainly on the coast, in the marshes and puddles of back dunes.

The Corsican euprocte lives in Acqua Tignese where adults and larvae take refuge in the basins during the dry season.

=== Flora ===
Some twenty-one rare threatened or endemic plants are present in the lagoon of Barcaggio and at the mouth of Acqua Tignese:

- Lippia nodiflora: a single locality in France, the Barcaggio lagoon
- Cressa cretica very threatened in mainland France, vulnerable in Corsica: lagoon of Barcaggio
- Vitex agnus-castus or the chaste tree grows at the mouths of streams. It is in sharp decline in mainland France. The mouth of Acqua Tignese is one of the 3 most beautiful settlements on the island

== Sources ==
- "Batraciens", Journal de la Pointe du Cap Corse (in French), Association Finocchiarola pour la gestion des espaces naturels de la Pointe du Cap Corse, 2009
- Cap Corse (in French), Conservatoire du littoral
- FR1100048 - Pointe du Cap Corse (in French), Inventaire national du patrimoine naturel (INPN)
- L'Acqua Tignese à Ersa [Station AEP] (in French), Ministère de l'Ecologie, du Développement Durable et de l'Energie, 2015
- L'Acqua Tignese Y7410600 (in French), Sandre
- Le comité de bassin de Corse (in French), Agence de l'eau Rhône Méditerranée Corse
- "Portail national de la connaissance du territoire", Géoportail (in French), IGN
