= André Tarallo =

French businessman (1927–2018)

- Born: André Antoine Charles Napoléon Tarallo; April 5, 1927; Centuri, Haute-Corse, France
- Died: April 24, 2018 (aged 91); Paris, France
- Other names: Monsieur Africa, Corsica Uncle
- Education: École nationale d'administration
- Employer: Elf Aquitaine
- Criminal charges: Misuse of funds
- Criminal penalty: 4 years prison + €2 million fine Later increased to 7 years
- Spouse: Colette Tarallo

André Tarallo (1927 in Centuri, Haute-Corse – 24 April 2018 in Paris), commonly known as Monsieur Africa, was a French businessman who worked as the top manager of African affairs for French petroleum company Elf Aquitaine from the late 1970s until his arrest in the 1990s for embezzlement.

== Early life ==
Tarallo was born at Centuri, Haute-Corse, the son of a tax collector. He studied at the École nationale d'administration.

== Career ==
For thirty years, Tarallo managed Elf's interests in Africa, surrounding himself with a team of fellow Corsicans in the higher echelons of the organisation. His connections and role as a negotiator in the region made him indispensable to Elf. In 1989 CEO Loïk Le Floch-Prigent, himself later indicted during the Elf fraud investigation, attempted to remove Tarallo from his position by forcing him to retire, but was largely unsuccessful. Tarallo remained with the titles of Chairman of Elf-Congo, Elf-Gabon and Elf Trading, a financial subsidiary in Geneva.

During his time at the head of Elf's African operations, he obtained the nicknames "Mister Africa" and "Corsican Uncle".

== Legal troubles ==
Tarallo was temporarily detained in 1997, when the investigation Elf Aquitaine reached him. Several subsequent investigations revealed further financial improprieties, including a 1999 Swiss investigation exposing his use of bank accounts maintained by Elf for bribing African governments, including the heads of state of Angola, Cameroon, the Republic of Congo and Gabon.

Prosecution found that Tarallo maintained several bank accounts with names such as Tomato, Salad, Langouste, Colette (the name of his wife), or Centuri in tax havens around the world, including Panama, Switzerland and Liechtenstein and accused him of stealing at least 50 million dollars. During a 2000 trial, he admitted the existence of the slush fund.

In November 2013 he was found guilty of misusing funds and was sentenced him to four years in prison and a €2 million fine. Tarallo maintained that bribing officials had not been not a misuse of funds, since it led to business deals for Elf. Less than two months later, he was released for health reasons and suffered an emergency heart surgery. In October 2004, following the appeal trial, his sentence was increased to seven years' imprisonment.

== Death ==
André Tarallo died on 24 April 2018 in Paris.

== See also ==
- Angola-France relations
- Angolagate
