= Ersa, Haute-Corse =

Ersa
- Commune
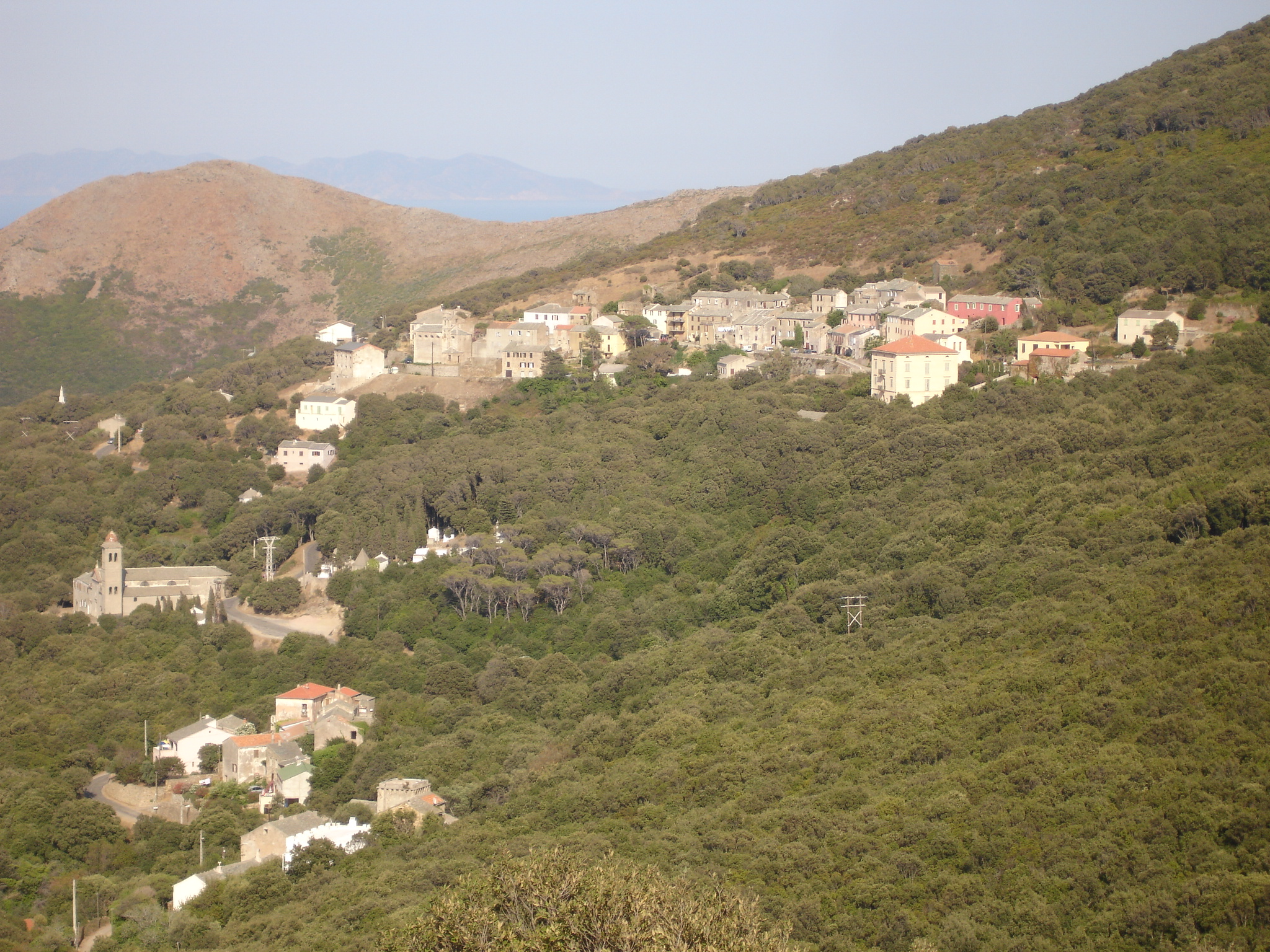
- Boticella, part of Ersa
- Location of Ersa
- Location within France Location within Corsica
- Coordinates: 42°58′34″N 9°22′51″E
- Country: France
- Region: Corsica
- Department: Haute-Corse
- Arrondissement: Bastia
- Canton: Cap Corse
- Intercommunality: Cap Corse

Government
  - Mayor (2020–2026): Thomas Micheli
- Area^{1}: 20.45 km^{2} (7.90 sq mi)
- Elevation: 260 m (850 ft)
- Highest elevation: 562 m (1,844 ft)
- Lowest elevation: 0 m (0 ft)
- Population (2023): 124
  - Density: 6.06/km^{2} (15.7/sq mi)
- Time zone: UTC+01:00 (CET)
  - Summer (DST): UTC+02:00 (CEST)
- INSEE/Postal code: 2B107 /20275
- ^{1} French Land Register data, which excludes lakes, ponds, glaciers > 1 km^{2} (0.386 sq mi or 247 acres) and river estuaries.

Ersa (French pronunciation: [ɛʁsa]) is a commune of the Haute-Corse department of France on the island of Corsica.

== Geography ==
Ersa is the northernmost commune of Corsica. It extends from Centuri to the West, to Rogliano to the East. Ersa is covered with shrubs and arid summits. The coast, which is carved to the West by the Cape Grossu (Cape Grosso) and the Punta of Corno of Becco, has beaches of sand and pebbles. The commune is watered by the streams Acqua Tignese and Granaghjulu on its undulating slopes of the Mount Maghjore (364 m).

== History ==
The ancient Latin name of Ersa is Arsia. Human occupation predated Roman conquest.

The commune experienced Turkish occupation during 1555 to 1571. In 1592 the Republic of Genoa annexed Ersa, which allied itself to Pasquale Paoli in 1757.

Until the 17th century, the Cape Corse was the target of frequent incursions of barbaric pirates. When Corse joined France at the end of the 17th century there were 1130 inhabitants, highly involved in the cultivation of grapes for wine. Since then the population has dropped to about 135 inhabitants.

== Villages ==
The villages of the commune of Ersa lie between the two summits. They are connected by the departmental route D80.

- 'Rota'
- 'Boticella' - this dominant village is grouped of the chapel Saint Jean-Baptiste, the Moulin Mattei is located nearby;
- 'Cucincu' - in the small hamlet discovers itself the chapel Saint-Peters
- 'Granaghjulu' - the mansions are perched and the lanes compact - the church Saint Andrew and its steeple are historic monuments.
- 'Guadellu'- the vast church Saint Andrew, today ruined, is the intermediate of the chapel of confraternity Santa-Croce.
- 'Gualdu' - this hamlet in the middle of Piazza raises itself to a square tower and the chapel Sainte- Anne
- 'Piazza': Chief town—an ancient convent of Capucins dating to the 17th century and sheltering the town hall, the school and the room of functions - the ancient church of the convent, Santa-Maria-Assunta, is today a parish - with the likewise chapel Saint-Antonie
- 'Poghju'- one discovers here a round tower, hence the chapels Saint-Joseph and Saint-Roch
- 'Suertu'- this village abandon to the ? San Nicolau is always dominated by the ruined chapel of the same name.

The ancient small port of Barcaghju, situated at the rear of the bay, near to the mouth of river Acqua Tignose, offers a panorama of the island of Giraglia. It occupies the location of a pre-Roman village. Nearby is a chapel dedicated to Saint Peter and 2 km (1.2 mi) to the south is the wrecked chapel of Saint-Lucie. Its beach has a large sand-dune. Near the commune of Rogliano, is the Genoese tower of Agnello, framing on the headland of Cape Agnello.

The second sea-front, Tollare, at the mouth of the River Granaghjulu, extends its ancient mansions around that of its chapel Saint-Anne and its round Genoese tower.

== Population ==
Historical population
Year	Pop.	±% p.a.
1968	236	—
1975	148	−6.45%
1982	113	−3.78%
1990	125	+1.27%
1999	132	+0.61%
2007	151	+1.70%
2012	152	+0.13%
2017	154	+0.26%
2023	124	−3.55%
Source: INSEE

== Environment ==
The old garbage dump has been removed. A new garbage recycling site has been created since 1 January 2009.

20 wind turbines (aerogenerators) have been erected (13 on Ersa and 7 on the neighbouring Rogliano). Inquiries of the French justice were undertaken because money was stolen for private and political purpose.

== See also ==
- Tour de Tollare
- Communes of the Haute-Corse department
