= Moulin Mattei =

Tower mill in Ersa, Corsica, France

Origin
- Mill location: Ersa, Haute-Corse, France
- Coordinates: 42.97458°N 9.36486°E

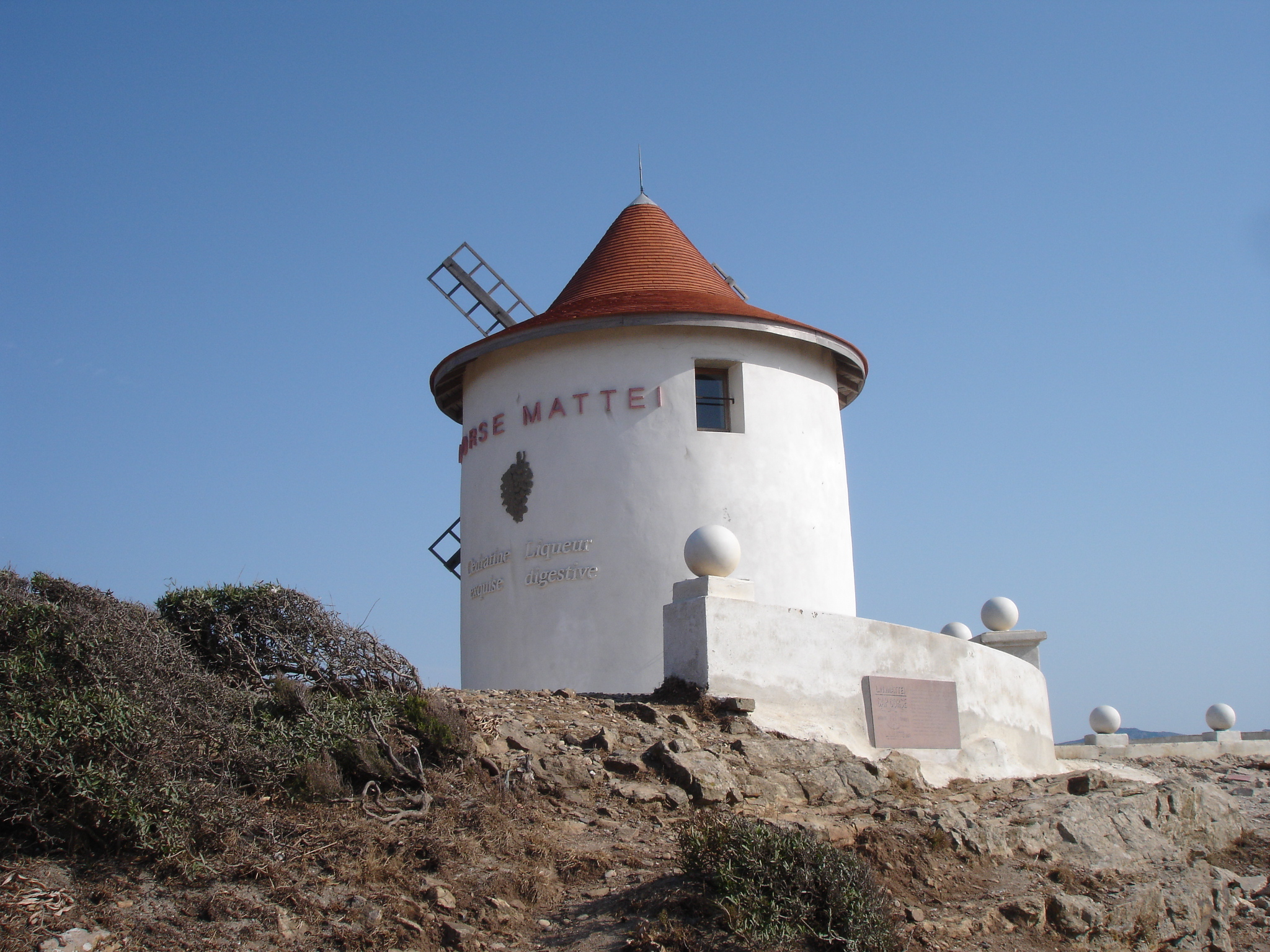
Moulin Mattei

The Moulin Mattei is a tower mill in Ersa, Haute-Corse on Corsica. It is situated at the northwest end of the Cap Corse peninsula between the village of Botticella and Centuri. It is placed on the Col de la Serra which has a height of 365 meters and it is open to tourists.

It was built at the end of the 18th century and had the name Moulin Franceschi. It was hit by lightning in 1836 and did not function anymore afterwards. The windmill was bought by the Mattei family from Bastia (descendants of Louis Napoléon Mattei from Ersa) to make it possible to make their apéritif Cap Corse. The windmill was completely renovated in April 2004.
