= Torra di Giraglia =

Genoese coastal defence tower in Corsica

Giraglia Tower
- Torra di Giraglia (Corsican)
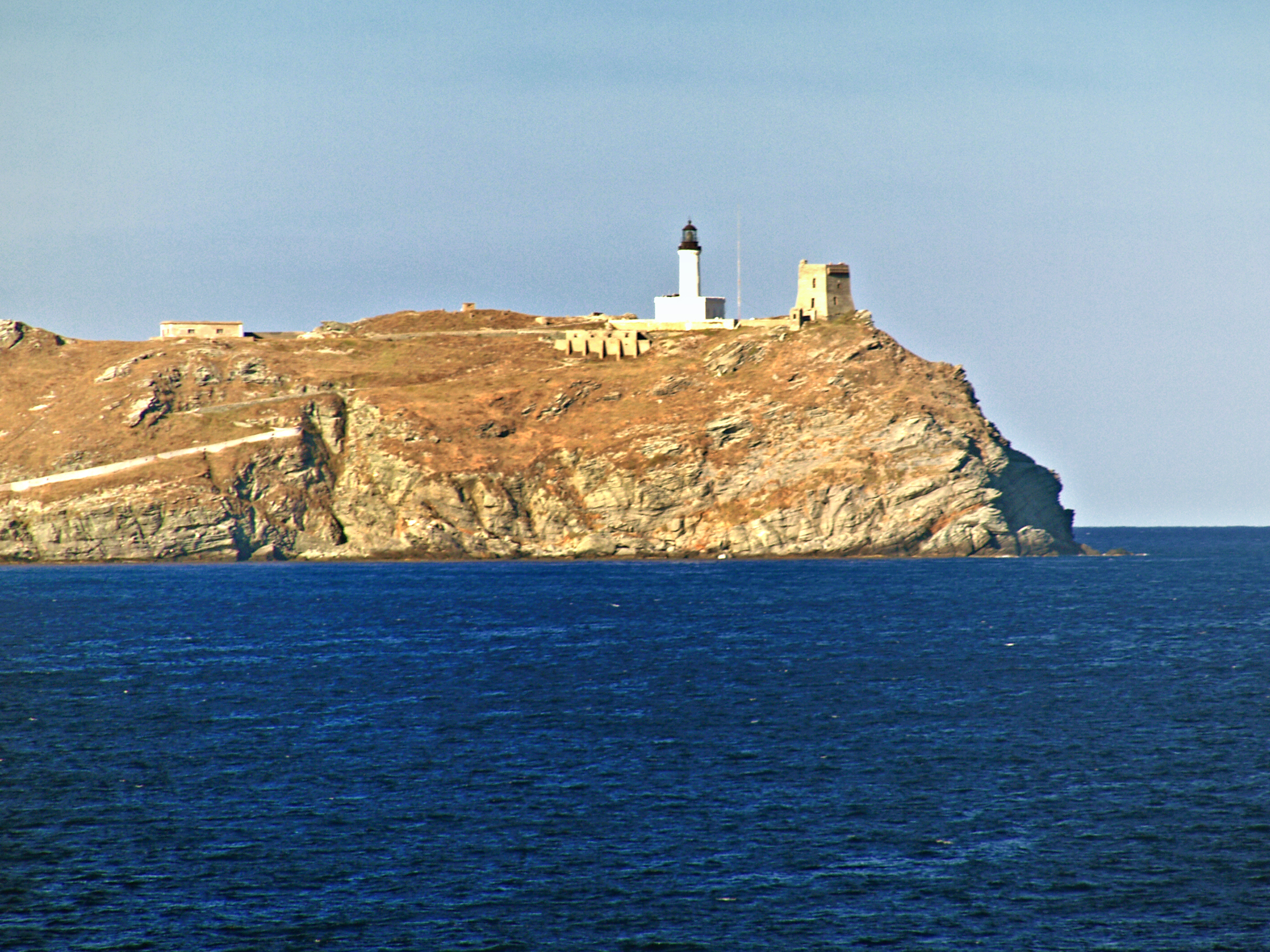

- Location within Corsica
- 43°1′37″N 9°24′20″E

History
- Built: 1584

Monument historique
- Designated: 11 February 2008
- Reference no.: PA2B000015

The Giraglia Tower (Corsican: Torra di Giraglia) is a Genoese tower located in the commune of Ersa (Haute-Corse) on the island of Giraglia near the north coast of Corsica. The tower sits near the northern tip of the island, 40 metres (44 yd) from the lighthouse at a height of 60 metres (200 ft) above the sea.

The construction of the tower began in April 1584. It was one of a series of coastal defences constructed by the Republic of Genoa between 1530 and 1620 to stem the attacks by Barbary pirates. The design of the Giaglia tower is unusual in being square rather than round. The tower is owned by the French state and in 2008 was listed as one of the official Historical Monuments of France.

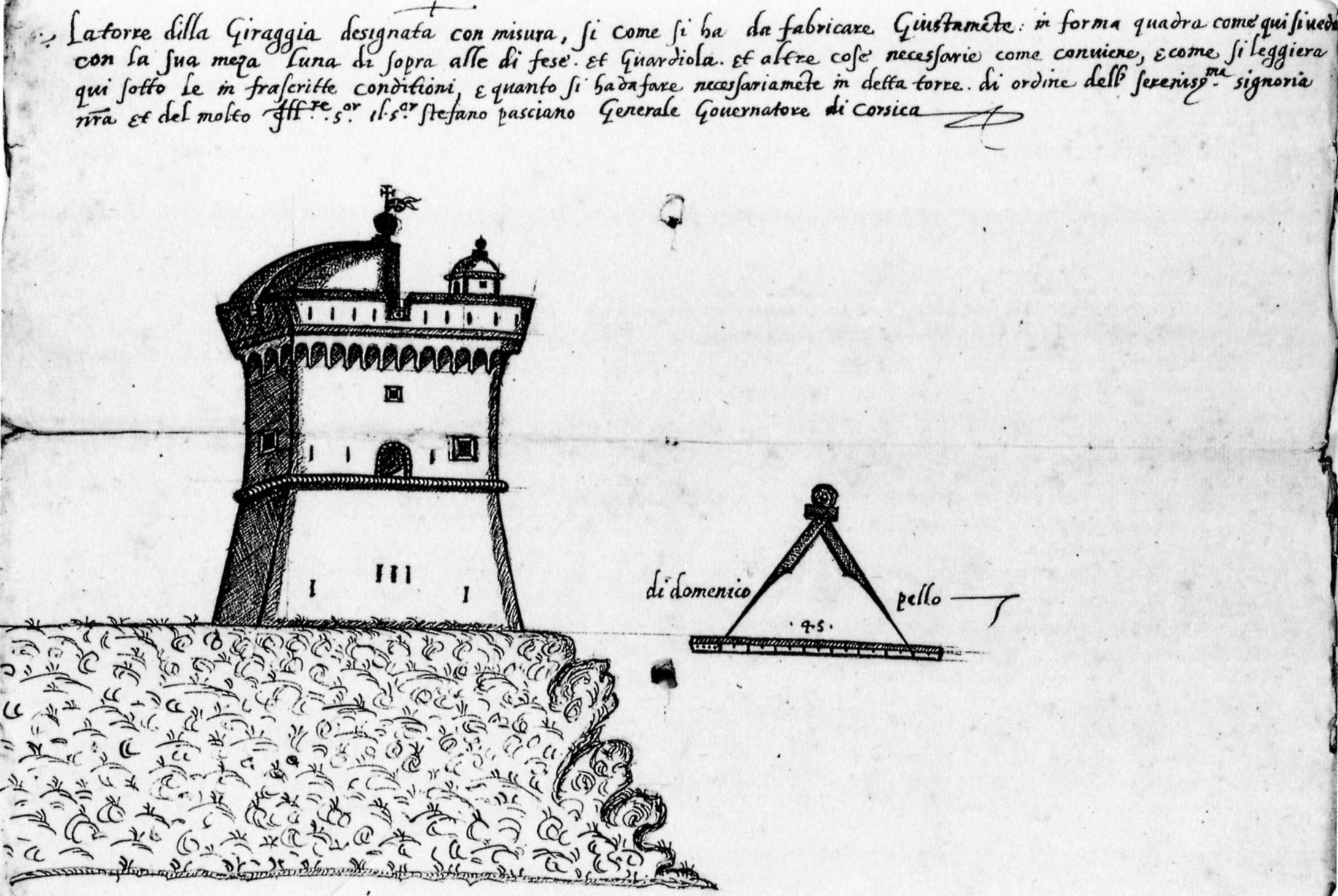
Drawing of the proposed tower from the Genoese archives, 1582.

== See also ==
- List of Genoese towers in Corsica
