= Lloyd Italico =

Italian insurance company

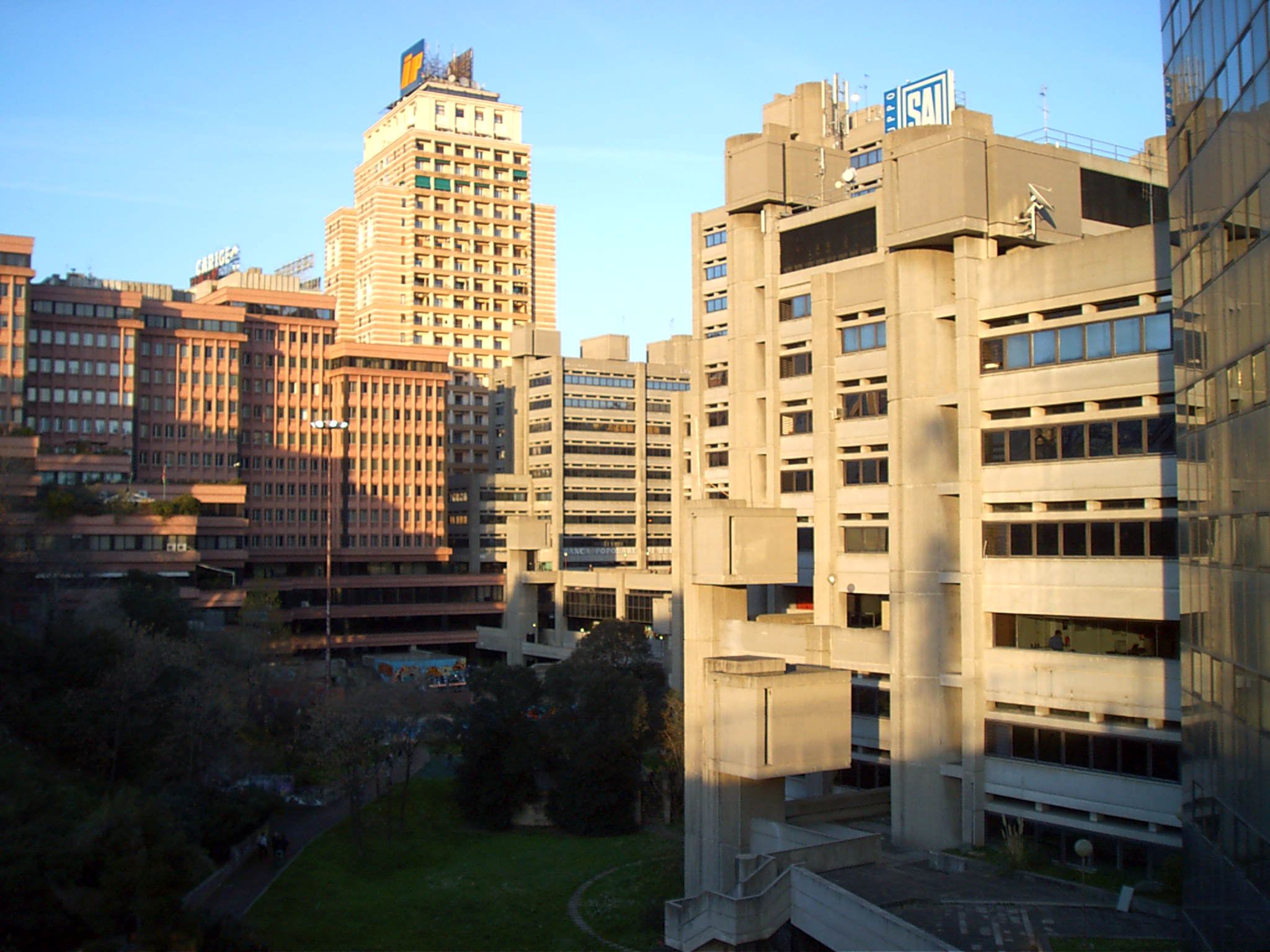
- Industry: Financial services
- Founded: 1917; 109 years ago
- Headquarters: The complex of the Ligurian Center, Genoa, Italy
- Area served: Italy
- Key people: Emilio Borzino; Andrea Giuseppe Croce; Carlo Bonomi
- Owner: Assicurazioni Generali
- Subsidiaries: Lloyd Italico Vita
- Website: www.lloyditalico.it

Lloyd Italico, Compagnia di assicurazioni e riassicurazioni known as Lloyd Italico was an Italian insurance company. It was specialized in maritime insurance. In 2006, the company was acquired by Assicurazioni Generali and maintained its brand until 2016.

== History ==
Lloyd Italico insurance company was founded in Genoa in 1917 by two companies of the Perrone group, Gio. Ansaldo & C. and Società Nazionale di Navigazione.

In 1934 Lloyd Italico acquired other Genoese insurance companies such as L'Ancora, Oceanus and Ermes. In the same year, the Genoese insurance broker Emilio Borzino became president of the company.
In 1946 the presidency passed to Andrea Giuseppe Croce, who later became the president of the Yacht Club Italiano and of the International Sailing Federation. The company further strengthened its presence within the Italian territory and extended its network of agents.

In 1980 Italia Assicurazioni S.p.A. acquired Lloyd Italico & L'Ancora.

In 1982 a merger took place where the company maintained its brand and remained independent in regard to all operations and commercial control.

In 1990 Lloyd Italico Assicurazioni S.p.A. was reconstituted. Royal Insurance Holdings plc acquired 90% of Lloyd Italico Assicurazioni S.p.A. and Lloyd Italico Vita S.p.A., a company specializing in life insurance, was also founded, which was controlled by Lloyd Italico Assicurazioni S.p.A. (80%) and Royal Insurance Holdings plc (20%).

In 2001 Lloyd Italico Assicurazioni S.p.A. and Lloyd Italico Vita S.p.A., were acquired by Toro Assicurazioni of the FIAT group.

In 2004 Lloyd Italico was incorporated into Toro Assicurazioni as an autonomous division which maintained separate management and continued to operate under its own brand.

In 2005 Toro Assicurazioni incorporated the subsidiary Lloyd Italico Vita.
In 2006 Toro Assicurazioni, together with Lloyd Italico and all the other subsidiaries, was purchased by Assicurazioni Generali.

== Name ==
The choice of the name 'Lloyd' was inspired by the Lloyd's of London while the adjective 'Italico' describes its geographical area of belonging.
