= Torra di Roglianu =

Genoese coastal defence tower in Corsica

Tower of Roglianu
- Torra di Roglianu (Corsican)
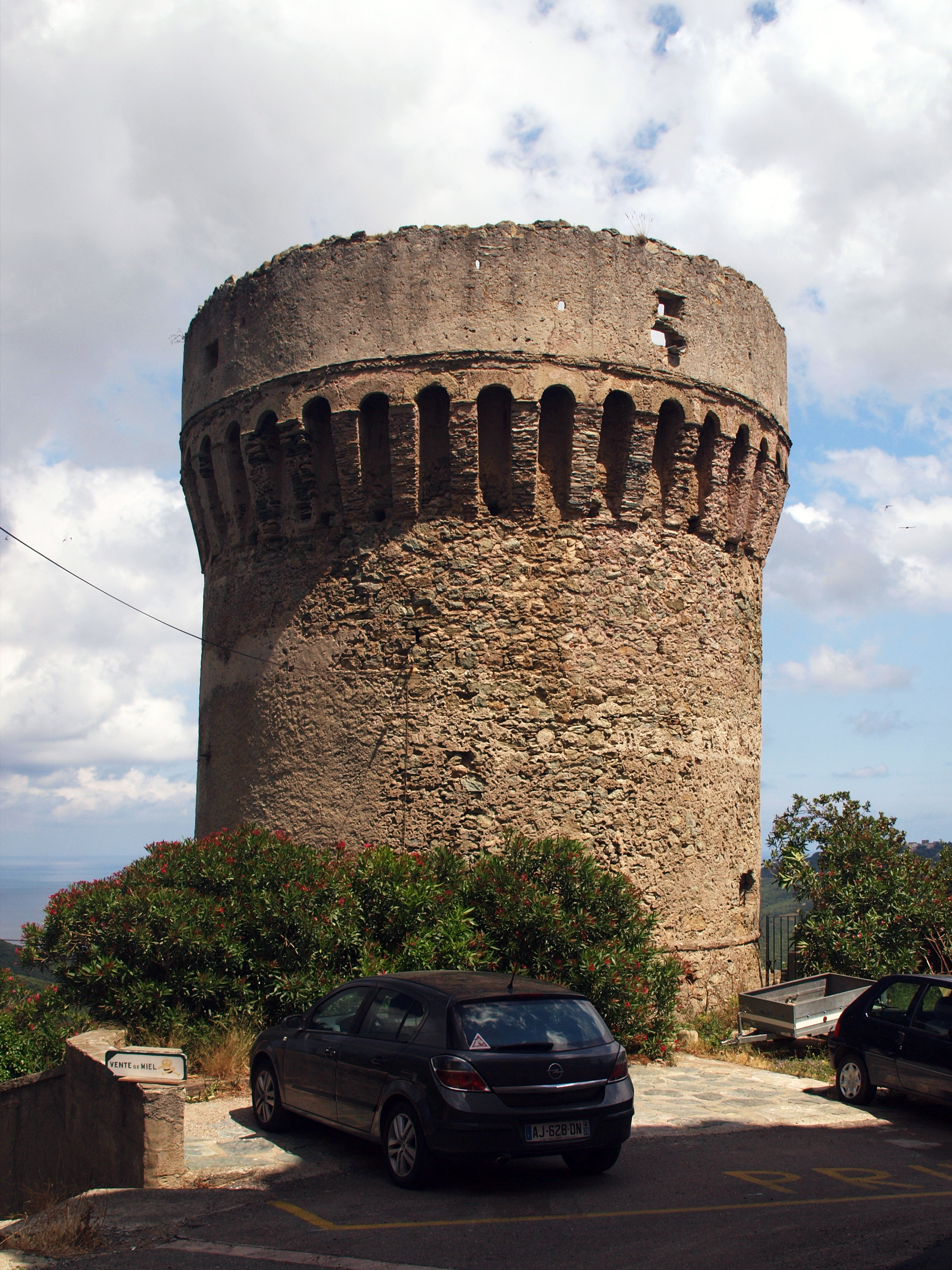

- Location within Corsica
- 42°57′18″N 9°25′08″E

History
- Built: 15th century

Monument historique
- Designated: 4 August 1992
- Reference no.: PA00099240

The Tower of Roglianu or Tower of Parrochia (Corsican: Torra di Roglianu) is a Genoese tower located in the commune of Rogliano in the Cap Corse region of the Corsica.

The tower is within the village of Rogliano at an altitude of 150 metres (490 ft) and not on the coast. It was built in the 15th century and is now privately owned. In 1935 it was listed as one of the official historical monuments of France.

== See also ==
- List of Genoese towers in Corsica
