= Torra di Finochjarola =

Genoese coastal defence tower in Corsica

- Torra di Finochjarola (Corsican)
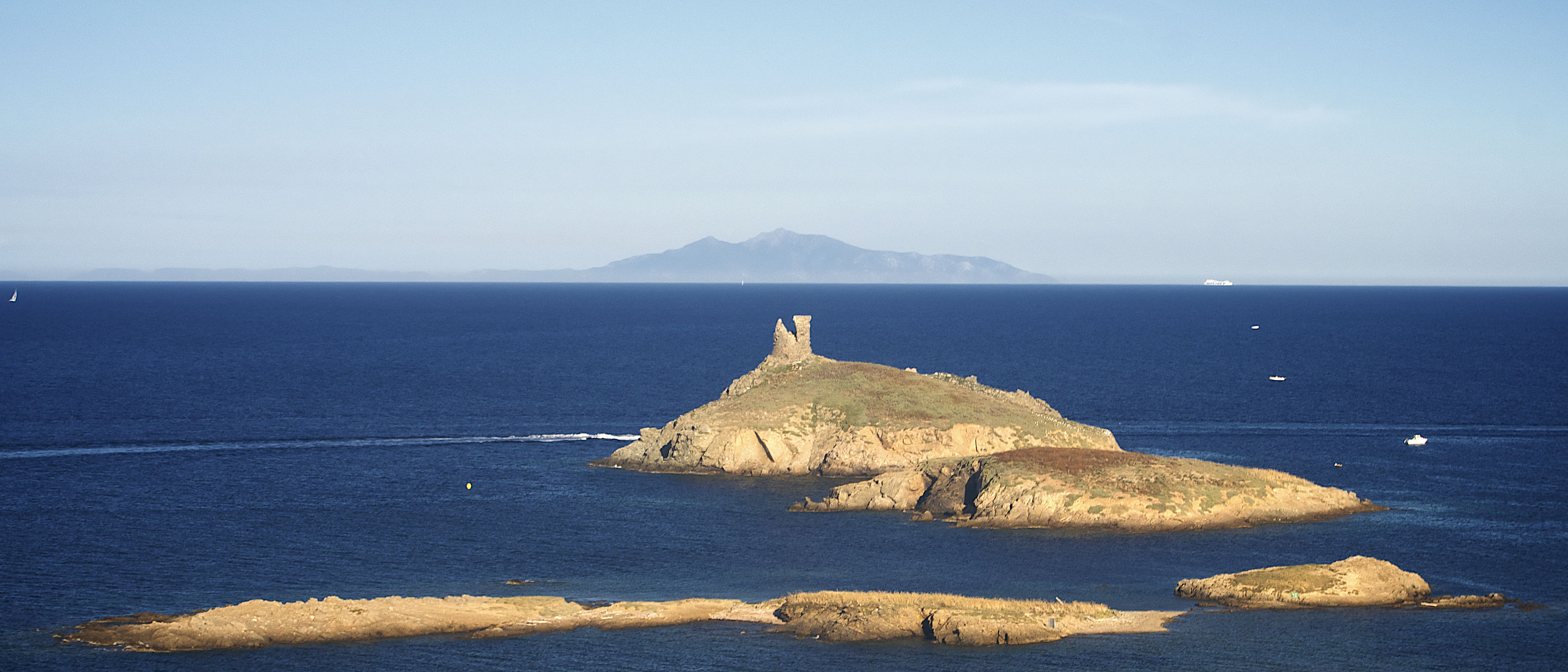

- Location within Corsica
- 42°59′3″N 9°28′16″E

History
- Built: Second half 16th century

The Tower of Finochjarola (Corsican: Torra di Finochjarola) is a ruined Genoese tower in Corsica, located on the island of Finacchiarola, in the commune of Rogliano (Haute-Corse). The Finacchiarola Islands are designated as a nature reserve.

The tower was one of a series of coastal defences constructed by the Republic of Genoa between 1530 and 1620 to stem the attacks by Barbary pirates.

== See also ==
- List of Genoese towers in Corsica
