= Torra di Tòllari =

Genoese coastal defence tower in Corsica

Tower of Tòllari
- Torra di Tòllari (Corsican)
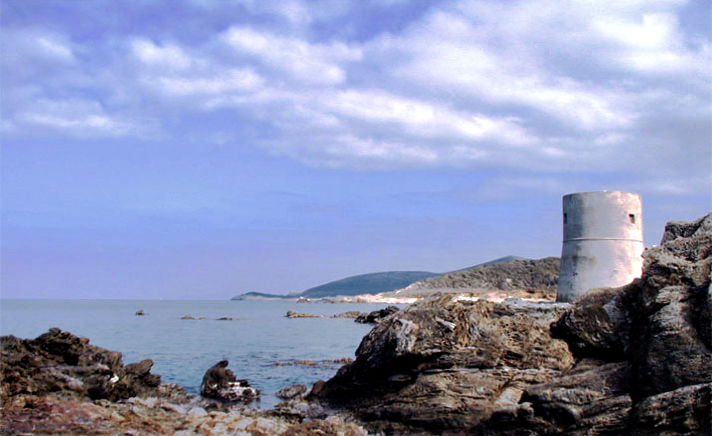

- Location within Corsica
- 43°0′29.5″N 9°23′15.2″E

History
- Built: Second half of 16th century

The Tower of Tòllari (Corsican: Torra di Tòllari) is a Genoese tower located in the commune of Ersa on the north coast of Cap Corse on the Corsica.

The tower was one of a series of coastal defences constructed by the Republic of Genoa between 1530 and 1620 to stem the attacks by Barbary pirates.

== See also ==
- List of Genoese towers in Corsica
