= Giraglia Rolex Cup =

The Giraglia Rolex Cup is a Mediterranean keelboat regatta, named after the island of Giraglia, which has been held annually since 1953. It is jointly organized by the Yacht Club Italiano and the Yacht Club de France, with the help of the Société Nautique de Saint-Tropez. Since 1997, in which year the current name was adopted, the race has been supported by the Rolex luxury wristwatch company.

The regatta consists of a week-long set of races, beginning with inshore races in the St. Tropez Bay followed by the primary event which begins in St. Tropez, France, passes through the Îles d'Hyères near the island of Giraglia, and then finishes off in Genoa, Italy, a total distance of 243 nautical miles (450 km).

The distance has been a constant in the race although the starting and ending points have been adjusted over time. Originally the course was from Sanremo, Italy, past Giraglia to Toulon, France.

== Race results ==
- 2001 Idea beat My Song with 110 entrants
- 2003 Alfa Romeo I (a Supermaxi) Neville Crichton (NZ) won with 170 entrants
- 2006 Alfa Romeo II (a Supermaxi) Neville Crichton (NZ) won in 27 h 48 min 12 s
- 2007 Alfa Romeo II, Neville Crichton (NZ), won again, in 22 h 45 min
