= Tour de Centuri =

Genoese coastal defence tower in Corsica

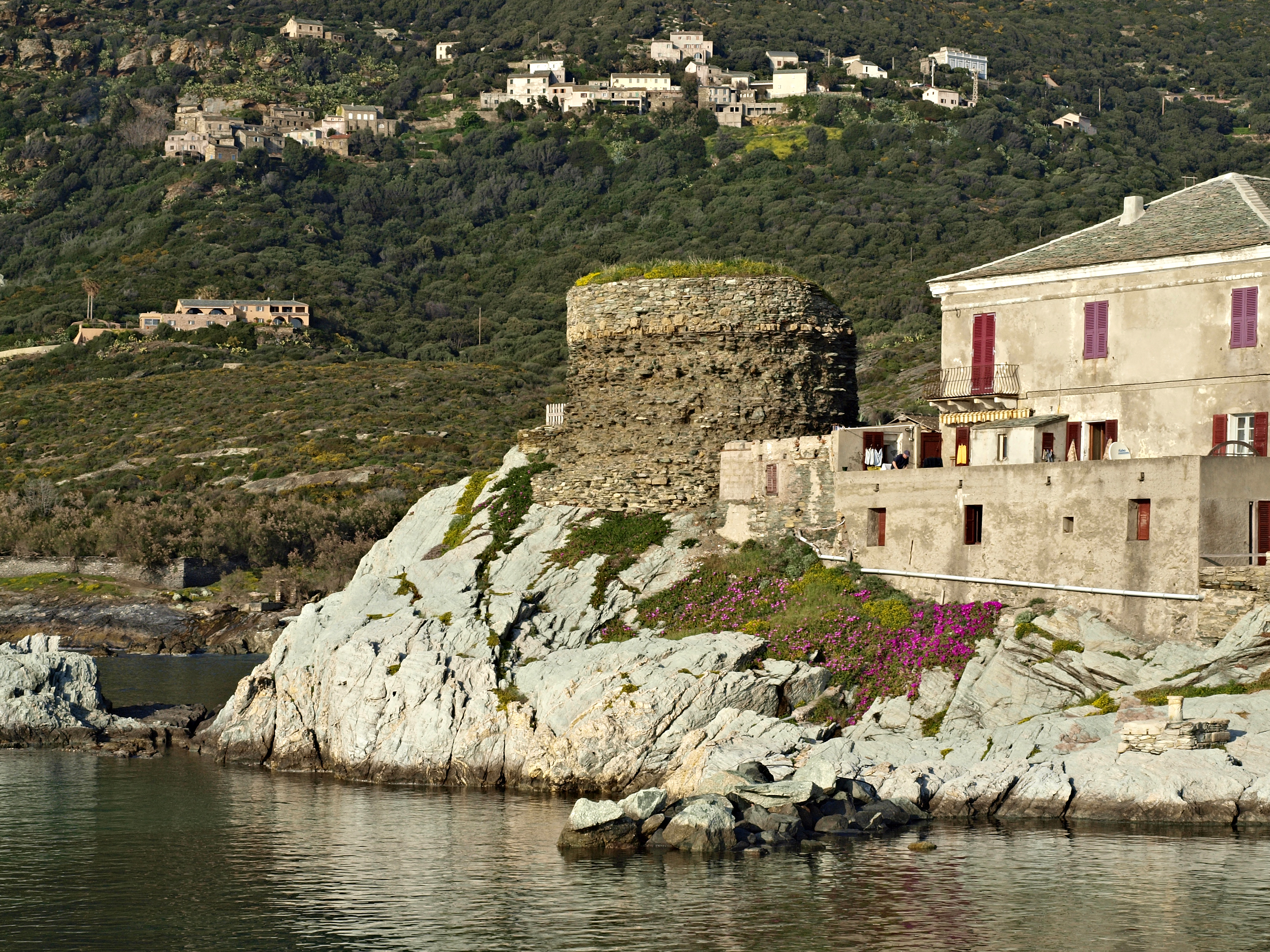

- Location within Corsica
- 42°58′0″N 9°20′59″E

History
- Built: Second half 16th century

The Tour de Centuri (Corsican: Torra di Centuri) is a ruined Genoese tower located in Corsica in the commune of Centuri, on the west coast of Cap Corse. Only the base of the tower survives.

The tower was one of a series of coastal defences constructed by the Republic of Genoa between 1530 and 1620 to stem the attacks by Barbary pirates.
