= Torra di Castelluchju =

Genoese coastal defence tower in Corsica

Tower of Castelluchju
- Torra di Castelluchju (Corsican)
- Location within Corsica
- 41°52′32″N 8°35′16″E

History
- Built: before 1597

The Tower of Castelluchju (Corsican: Torra di Castelluchju) is a ruined Genoese tower located in the commune of Ajaccio (Corse-du-Sud) off the west coast of the Corsica. The tower sits on the southern end of the Grande Sanguinaire, the largest island in the Îles Sanguinaires archipelago.

The tower was one of a series of coastal defences built by the Republic of Genoa between 1530 and 1620 to stem the attacks by Barbary pirates. The exact year when the tower was built is not known, but it is mentioned in a report written in 1597 for the Genoese authorities by the engineer Britio Tramallo and the lawyer Gieronimo Bonaparte. The report gives the dimensions of three structures on the island: a chapel, a round tower and the surviving small square tower. The small tower (la torretta piccola) now known as the Tour de Castelluccio, is recorded as being 5.6 m (18 ft) in height with walls 0.63 m (2.1 ft) thick at the base reducing to 0.31 m (1.0 ft) at the top. The large round tower was 6 m (20 ft) in height and 7.75 m (25.4 ft) in diameter. It sat on the highest point of the Grande Sanguinaire island but was demolished in the 19th century when the existing lighthouse was constructed. In Genoese documents the large round tower was referred to as the Sanguinare di Fuori or the Sanguinare di Mare while the Tour de la Parata was the Sanguinare di Terra.

== See also ==
- List of Genoese towers in Corsica

== Sources ==
- Cubells, Jean-François; et al. (2007). Un site, des monuments La Parata et Les Sanguinaires: Pour une étude pluridisciplinaire du patrimoine historique et naturel de la Corse (PDF) (in French). La Ville d’Ajaccio et le Conseil Général de la Corse-du-Sud. p. 73. ISBN 978-286-620-201-9.
- Graziani, Antoine-Marie (1992). Les Tours Littorales (in French and Italian). Ajaccio, France: Alain Piazzola. pp. 84–85, 135. ISBN 2-907161-06-7.
- Graziani, Antoine-Marie (2000). "Les ouvrages de défense en Corse contre les Turcs (1530-1650)". In Vergé-Franceschi, Michel; Graziani, Antoine-Marie (eds.). La guerre de course en Méditerranée (1515-1830) (in French). Paris: Presses de l'Université Paris IV-Sorbonne. pp. 73–144. ISBN 2-84050-167-8.
