= Yacht Club de France =

Sailing club in France

- Burgee

- Ensign
- Short name: RTYC
- Founded: 1867; 159 years ago
- Location: France
- Website: www.ycf-club.fr

The Yacht Club de France is the senior nautical club in France, and one of the most important yacht clubs in the world.

== History ==
The club was established in 1867, during the Second French Empire. It was bestowed Royal Patronage by Emperor Napoleon III, and its first president was Admiral Charles Rigault de Genouilly.

In 1891, a new club was founded, the Union des Yachts Français, Société d'Encouragement pour la Navigation de Plaisance. In 1907, the two clubs merged and were recognized by the International Yacht Racing Union (now the International Sailing Federation).

In 1993, as part of the Club's 125th celebrations, Maïté Etchechoury wrote Yacht-club de France : sous-série GG7 : répertoire numérique détaillé.

On September 30, 2022 the Union Nationale pour la Course au Large (UNCL) yacht club was merged into the Yacht Club de France.

== Activities ==
Among other competitions, the Yacht Club de France, together with the Yacht Club Italiano, runs the Giraglia Rolex Cup regatta from Saint Tropez, past Giraglia (the northernmost point of Corsica), to Genoa, Italy.
