= Torra di Santa Maria Chjapella =

Genoese coastal defence tower in Corsica

Tower of Santa Maria Chjapella
- Torra di Santa Maria Chjapella (Corsican)
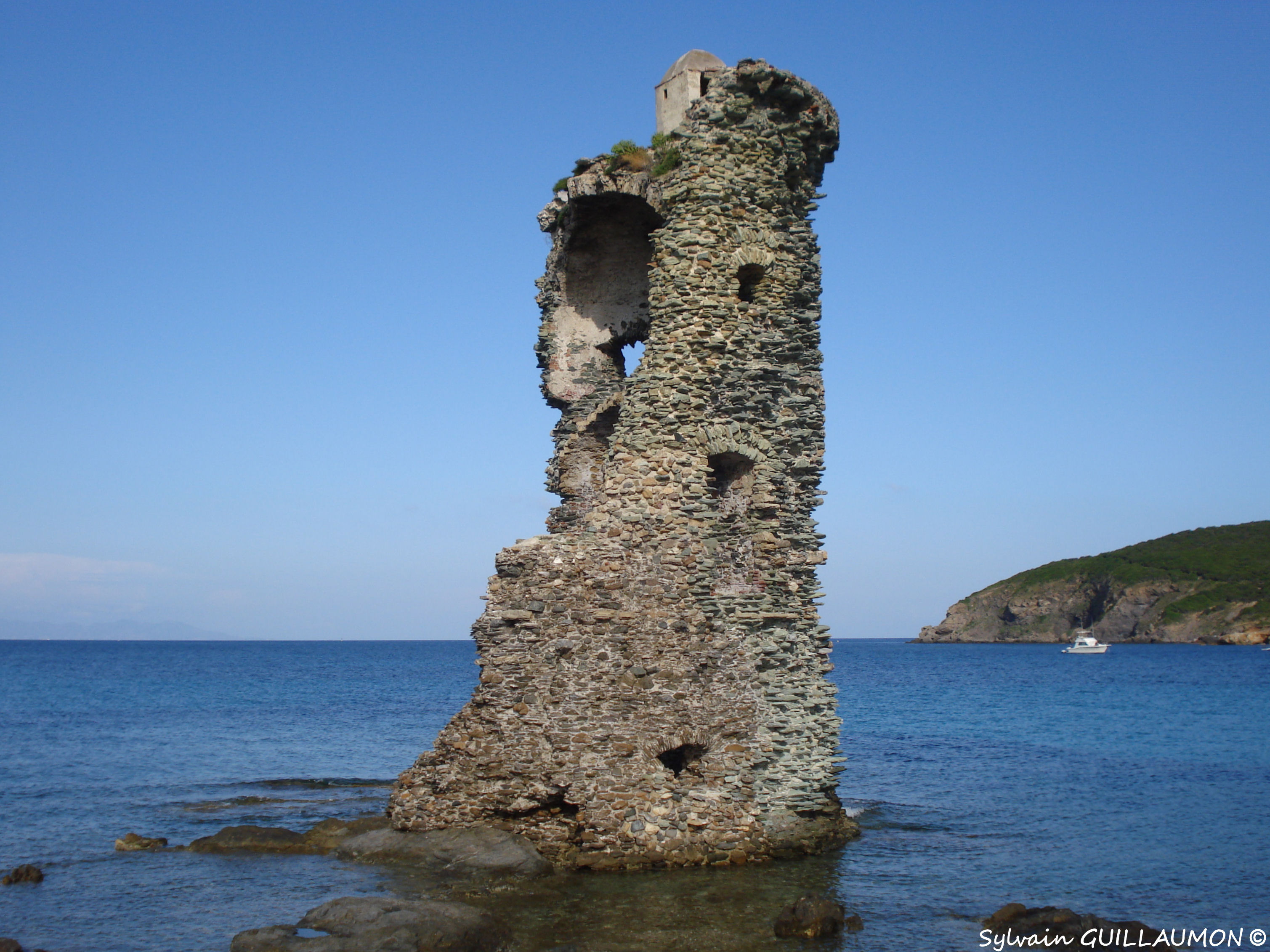

- Location within Corsica
- 42°59′27″N 9°27′06″E

History
- Built: 1548-1549

Monument historique
- Designated: 8 March 1991
- Reference no.: PA00099277

The Tower of Santa Maria Chjapella (Corsican: Torra di Santa Maria Chjapella) is a ruined Genoese tower located in the commune of Rogliano (Haute Corse) on the east coast of the Corsica. Only part of the tower survives.

The tower was built between 1548 and 1549 for Giacomo Santo Da Mare. It was one of a series of coastal defences constructed by the Republic of Genoa between 1530 and 1620 to stem the attacks by Barbary pirates. The tower was partially destroyed in 1794 by British warships under the command of Horatio Nelson during the French Revolutionary Wars.

The tower is unusually tall and contained two internal room, one above the other, similar to the Torra di a Parata near Ajaccio. In 1991 it was listed as one of the official historical monuments of France. It is owned and maintained by the Collectivité Territoriale de Corse in an agreement with the French government agency, the Conservatoire du littoral. The agency plans to purchase 1,147 hectares (2,830 acres) of the surrounding coastline and as of 2017 had acquired 669 hectares (1,650 acres).

== See also ==
- List of Genoese towers in Corsica
