= Torra di a Parata =

Genoese tower/fort in Corsica (built 1550–51)

Parata Tower
- Torra di a Parata (Corsican)
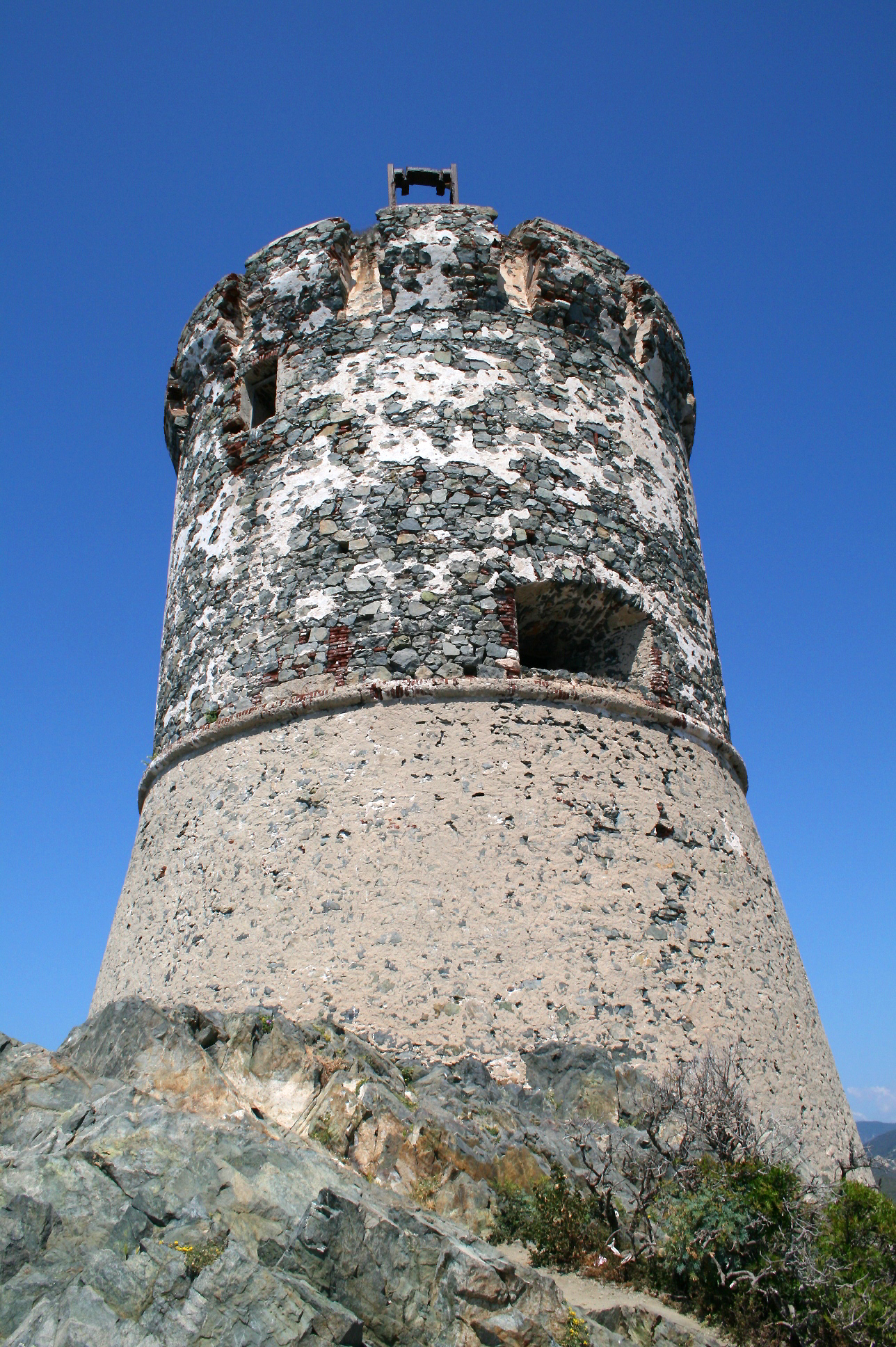

- Location within Corsica
- 41°53′43″N 8°36′30″E

History
- Built: 1550-1551

Site notes
- Architect: Giacomo Lombardo

The Torra di a Parata (English: Parata Tower, French: Tour de Parata) is a ruined Genoese tower located in the commune of Ajaccio, Corse-du-Sud, on the west coast of the island of Corsica, France. The tower sits at an elevation of 55 metres (180 ft) on a rocky promontory, the Pointe de la Parata, to the north-east of the Îles Sanguinaires archipelago.

The tower was built in 1550–1551 by Giacomo Lombardo. It was one of a series of coastal defences constructed by the Republic of Genoa between 1530 and 1620 to stem the attacks by Barbary pirates. The tower is 12 m (39 ft) in height and has a diameter of 7.3 m (24 ft) at the level of the roof platform. It contains two vaulted rooms, one above the other.

In Genoese documents the tower is called the Sanguinera di Terra. A similar tower which once sat on the highest point of the Grande Sanguinaire island was called the Sanguinera di Fuori or the Sanguinera di Mare. The Grande Sanguinaire tower was demolished in the 19th century when the existing lighthouse was constructed. A second small tower at the south-west end of the Grande Sanguinaire island has survived. In a Genoese document it is referred to as the torretta piccola (little tower). It is now called the Torra di Castelluchju.

== Gallery ==
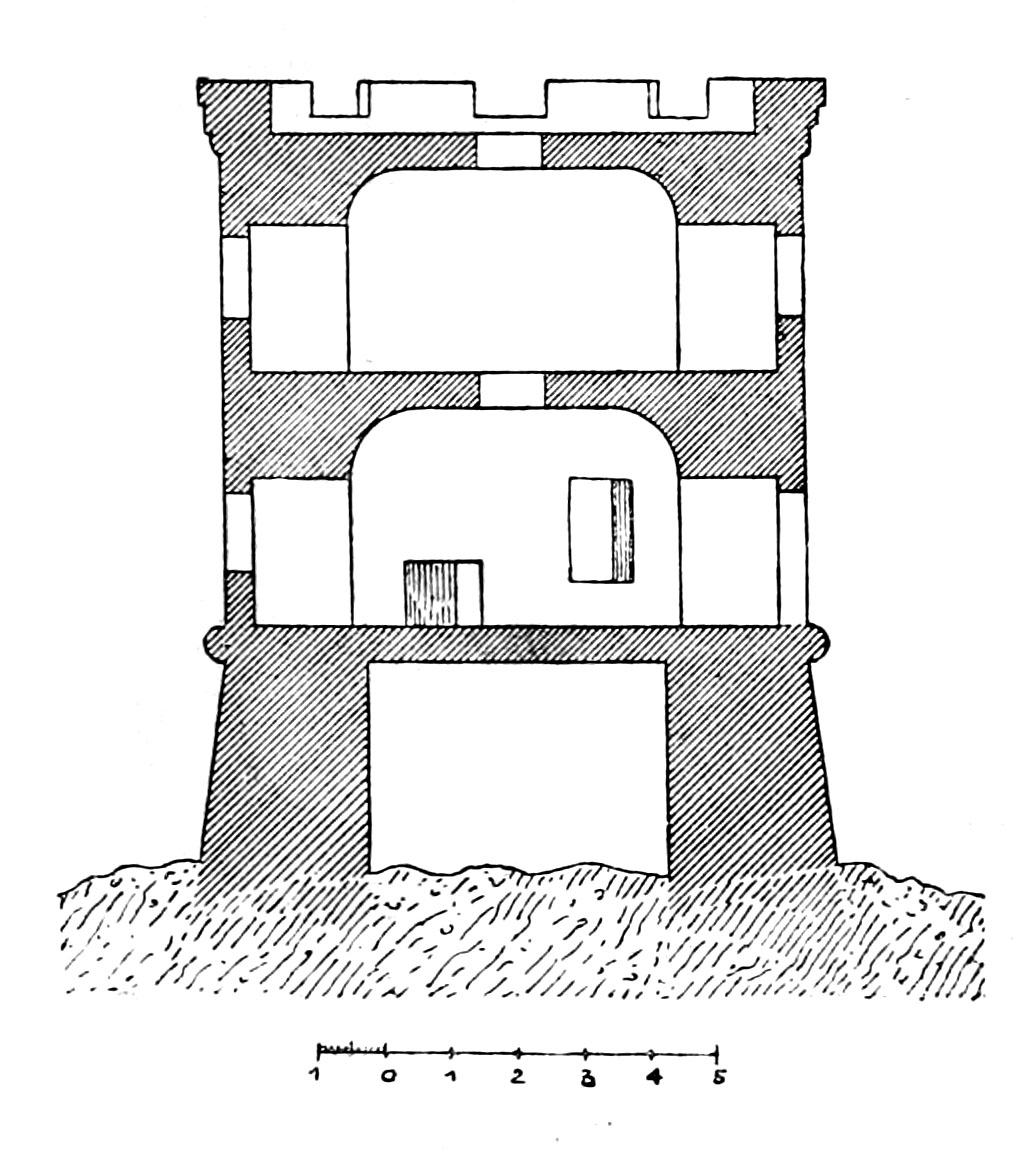
Section through the tower

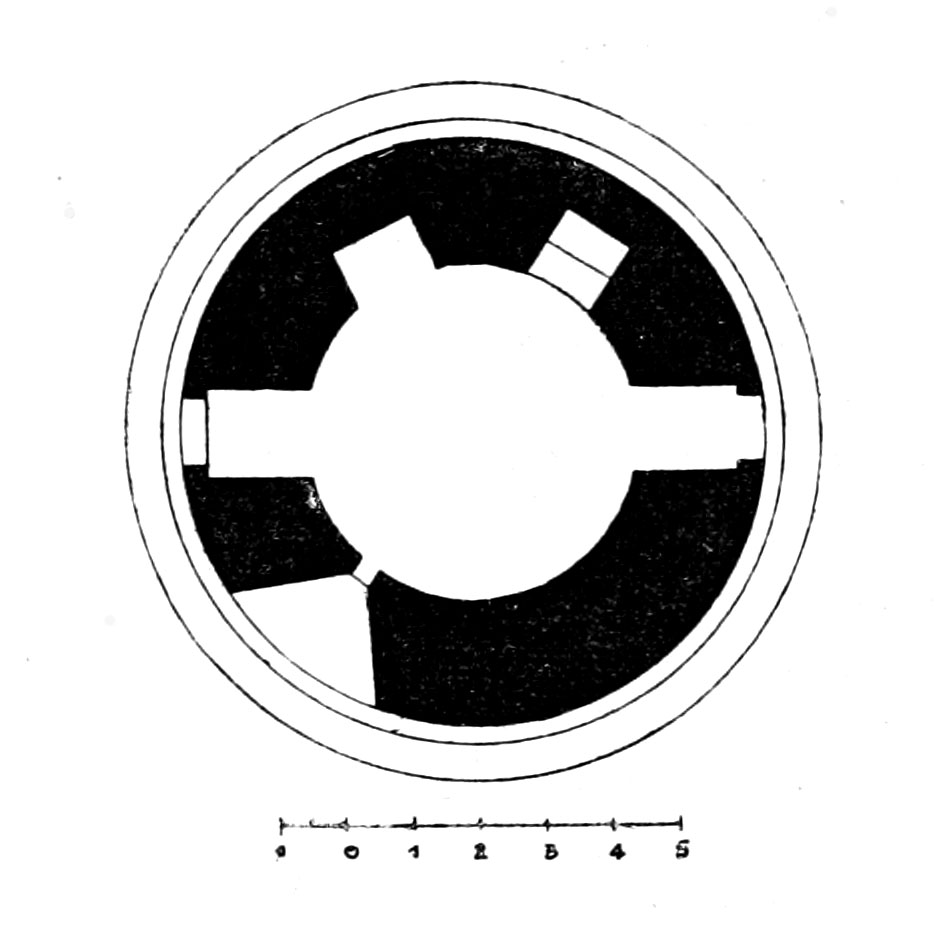
Plan of the lower floor

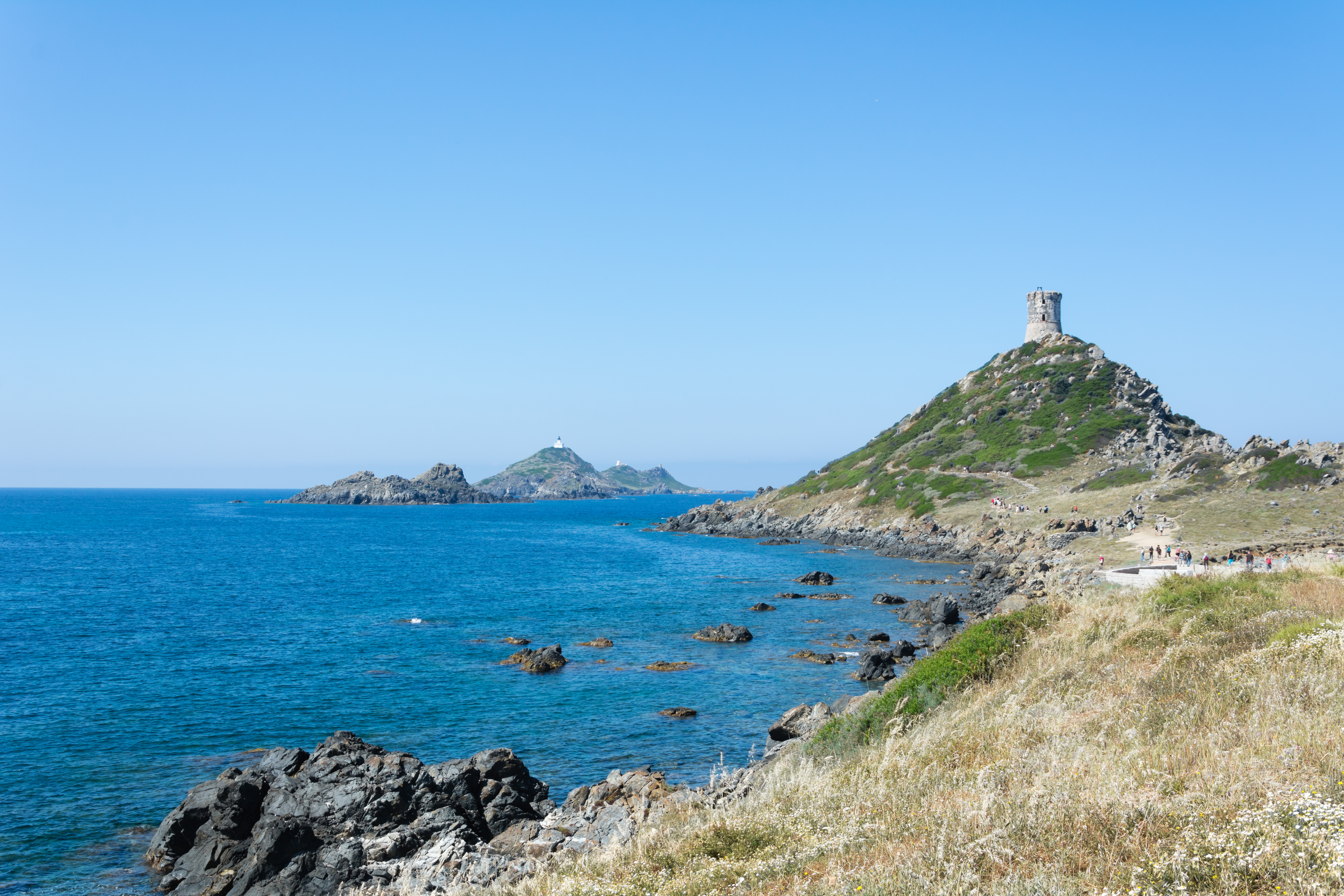
Tower and the Îles Sanguinaires

== See also ==
- List of Genoese towers in Corsica

== Sources ==
- Cubells, Jean-François; et al. (2007). Un site, des monuments La Parata et Les Sanguinaires: Pour une étude pluridisciplinaire du patrimoine historique et naturel de la Corse (PDF). La Ville d’Ajaccio et le Conseil Général de la Corse-du-Sud. ISBN 978-286-620-201-9.
- Fréminville, Joseph de (1894a). "Tours génoises du littoral de la Corse". Bulletin archéologique du Comité des travaux historiques et scientifiques (in French): 47–57.
- Fréminville, Joseph de (1894b). Tours génoises du littoral de la Corse (PDF) (in French). Paris. OCLC 494605587.
- Graziani, Antoine-Marie (1992). Les Tours Littorales (in French and Italian). Ajaccio, France: Alain Piazzola. ISBN 2-907161-06-7.
- Graziani, Antoine-Marie (2000). "Les ouvrages de défense en Corse contre les Turcs (1530-1650)". In Vergé-Franceschi, Michel; Graziani, Antoine-Marie (eds.). La guerre de course en Méditerranée (1515-1830) (in French). Paris: Presses de l'Université Paris IV-Sorbonne. ISBN 2-84050-167-8.
