= Capobianco =

Capobianco is a surname. Notable people with the surname include:

- Andrea Capobianco (born 1966), Italian basketball coach
- Andrew Capobianco (born 1999), American diver
- Bartolomeo Capobianco (died 1547), Italian bishop
- Dean Capobianco (born 1970), Australian sprinter
- Eliane Capobianco (born 1973), Bolivian politician
- Fabrizio Capobianco (born 1970), Italian entrepreneur
- Kyle Capobianco (born 1997), Canadian ice hockey player
- Michael Capobianco (born 1950), American writer
- Pier Antonio Capobianco (1619–1689), Italian bishop
- Pietro Paolo Capobianco (died 1505), Italian bishop
- Richard M. Capobianco (graduated 1979), American philosopher
- Tito Capobianco (1931–2018), Argentine opera director
