= Loïk Le Floch-Prigent =

French engineer and manager (1943–2025)

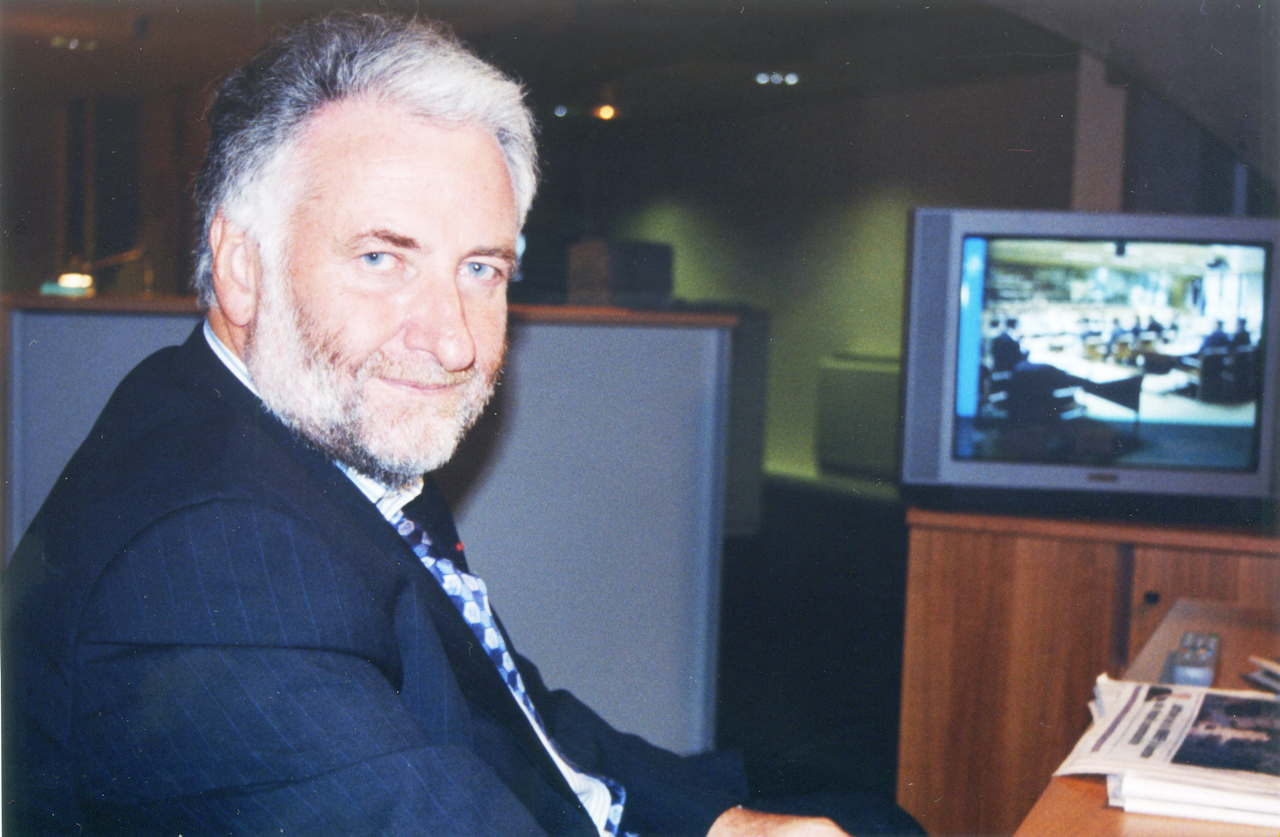
- Le Floch-Prigent in 1999
- Born: Loïk Gérard Henri Marie Joseph Le Floch-Prigent; 21 September 1943; Brest, France
- Died: 15 July 2025 (aged 81); Paris, France
- Education: Grenoble Institute of Technology
- Occupations: Businessman; engineer
- Known for: CEO of Elf Aquitaine and SNCF
- Spouse: Fatima Belaïd
- Relatives: Maodez Glanndour (uncle)

Loïk Gérard Henri Marie Joseph Le Floch-Prigent (21 September 1943 – 15 July 2025) was a French engineer and businessman. He was CEO of Elf Aquitaine between July 1989 and 1993, then president of SNCF from December 1995 to July 1996, when he was indicted in connection with the Elf affair. He is particularly known in the "Françafrique" circles.

In September 2012, Le Floch-Prigent was charged with being an accessory to fraud whilst in Togo after a complaint from an Emirati businessman was filed claiming that he had been manipulated out of $48 million. He was extradited from Ivory Coast and appeared before a judge where he was questioned for three hours in Lomé.

== Personal life and death ==
Le Floch-Prigent was born in Brest on 21 September 1943. He was the nephew of the Catholic priest, writer and poet Maodez Glanndour.

Le Floch-Prigent married Fatima Belaïd. The couple later divorced.

His rise to the head of public companies was initially facilitated by the positions he held in the office of the Minister of Industry and his connections in the political world. He was CEO of the oil company Elf between July 1989 and 1993, then president of the SNCF from December 1995 to July 1996. He was subsequently sentenced by the courts to prison terms for embezzlement in the Elf affair.

As part of the Dumas trial, Loïk Le Floch-Prigent was sentenced on appeal on 29 January 2003, to 30 months in prison and a two million franc fine. He was imprisoned in Fresnes prison (Val-de-Marne) on 31 January 2003. As part of the Elf case.

From 2005 to 2010, on behalf of Pilatus, and as part of his mining expertise, he traveled to Africa, to Congo-Brazzaville, the Democratic Republic of Congo, Mali, Benin, Tanzania, Egypt, but also to Iraq (Iraqi Kurdistan), Oman, the United Arab Emirates, Qatar, Syria, Turkey, Canada and the United States.

Since 2008, he has been accused of being responsible for organizing a Nigerian-style fraud involving Pilatus Energy AG.

In 2021, several media outlets revealed the possibility that he would be Eric Zemmour's possible economic advisor for his potential candidacy in the 2022 presidential election.

Le Floch-Prigent died from cancer, aged 81, in Paris, France, on 15 July 2025.

== Bibliography ==
- (1998) Pour des fonds de pension européens, Éditions Petrelle.
- (2001) Affaire Elf, affaire d'État, édition Le Cherche midi. (ISBN 978-2-86274-926-6)
- (2005) La Crevette et le Champignon, édition Le Cherche-Midi. (ISBN 978-2-7491-0368-6)
- (2006) Une incarcération ordinaire, édition Le Cherche midi, (ISBN 978-2-7491-0501-7)
- (2012) Granit rosse, éditions Coop Breizh.
- (2014) Le Mouton noir : 40 ans dans les coulisses de la République, édition Pygmalion.
- (2016) La Bataille de l’industrie - La France va-t-elle la perdre ? Peut-elle la gagner ?, Jacques Marie Laffont éditeur. (ISBN 978-2-36124-140-7)
- (2017) Carnets de route d'un Africain, éditions Elytel.
- (2018) Il ne faut pas se tromper : pour en finir avec les idées reçues sur l'énergie et l'industrie, éditions Elytel.
- (2019) Le Silence des dolmens, édition De Borée. (ISBN 978-2-8129-2557-3)
- (2020) Pour une France industrielle, éditions Elytel.
- (2020) Repenser la prison, éditions Michalon. (ISBN 978-2-84186-944-2)
- (2022) Capitaines d'industrie : ces Français qui font les succès industriels de la France, éditions Elytel. (ISBN 978-2-917182-19-2)
- (2024) 1997 Année zéro du déclin de la France, éditions Elytel. (ISBN 978-2-917182-23-9)
