= Torra d'Agnellu =

16th-centuey structure on Corsica, France

Tower of Agnellu
- Torra d'Agnellu (Corsican)
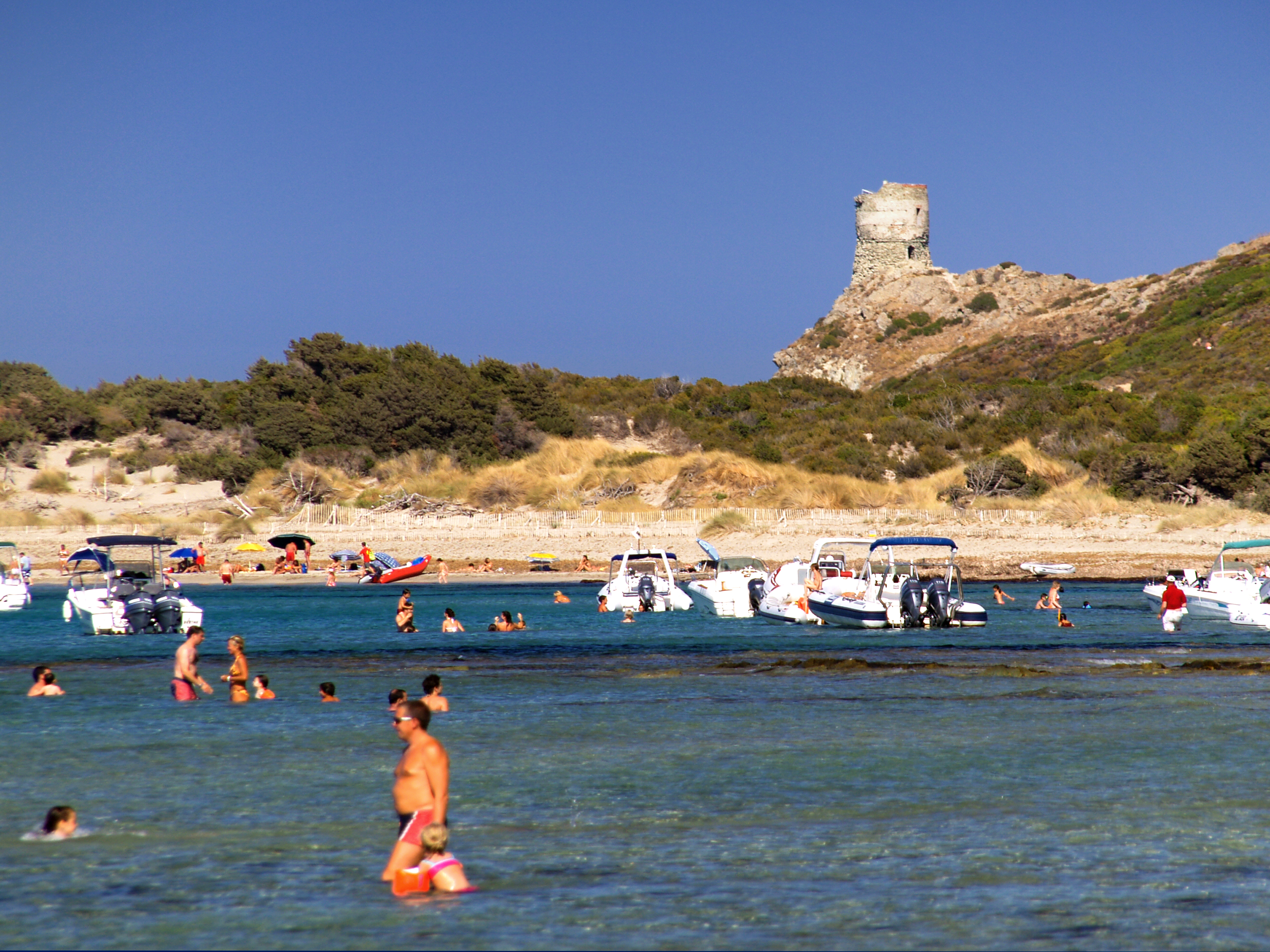

- Location within Corsica
- 43°00′36″N 9°25′38″E

History
- Built: Late 16th century

The Tower of Agnellu (Corsican: Torra d'Agnellu) is a Genoese tower on the French island of Corsica, located in the commune of Rogliano (Haute-Corse).

The tower was built at the end of the 16th century. It is one of a series of coastal defences constructed by the Republic of Genoa between 1530 and 1620 to stem the attacks by Barbary pirates.

== See also ==
- List of Genoese towers in Corsica
