= Rogliano, Haute-Corse =

Rogliano Ruglianu
- Commune
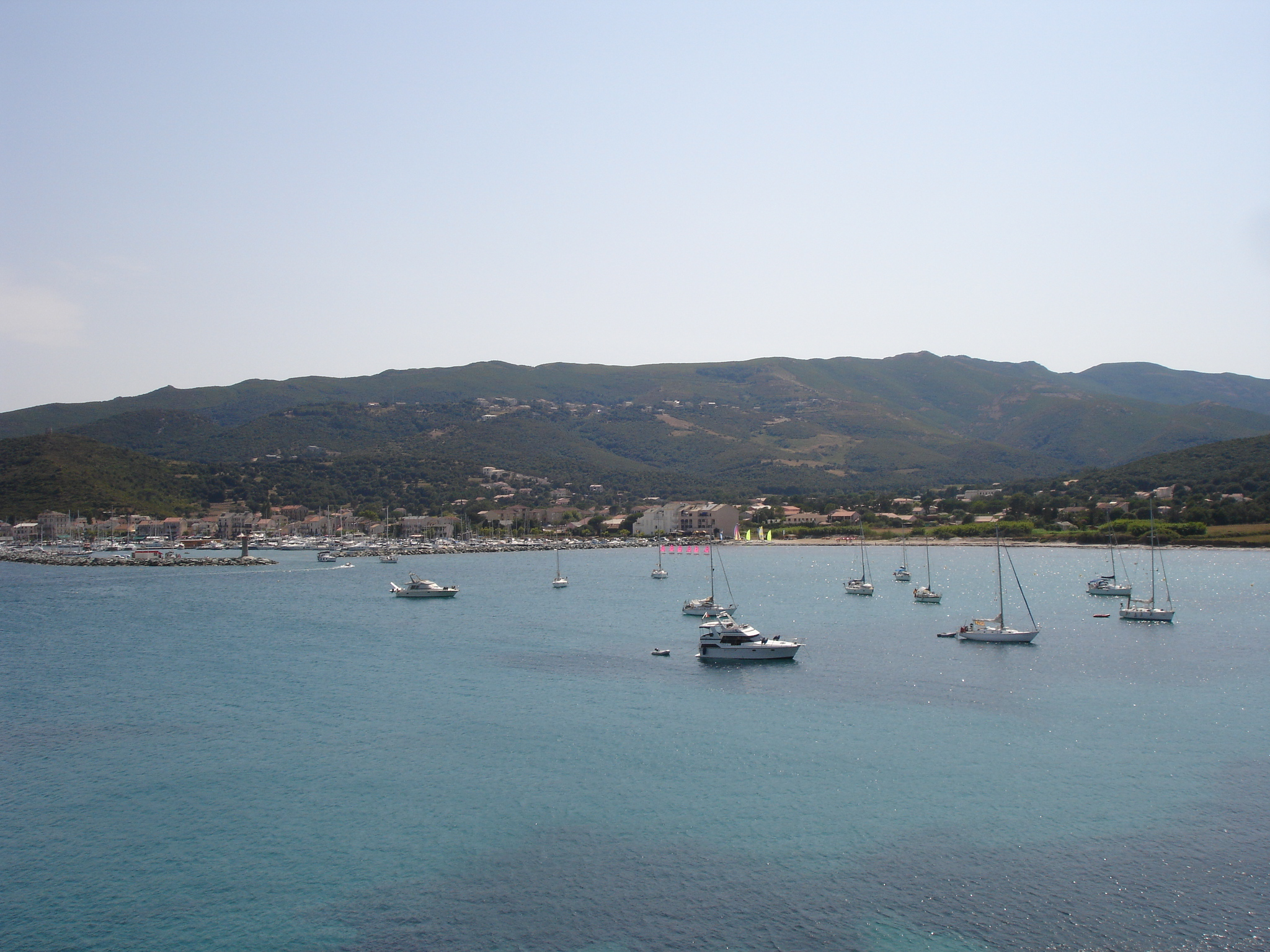
- View from Macinaggio Bay
- Location of Rogliano
- Location within France Location within Corsica
- Coordinates: 42°58′01″N 9°25′25″E
- Country: France
- Region: Corsica
- Department: Haute-Corse
- Arrondissement: Bastia
- Canton: Cap Corse
- Intercommunality: Cap Corse

Government
  - Mayor (2020–2026): Patrice Quilici
- Area^{1}: 26.7 km^{2} (10.3 sq mi)
- Elevation: 200 m (660 ft)
- Highest elevation: 602 m (1,975 ft)
- Lowest elevation: 0 m (0 ft)
- Population (2023): 530
  - Density: 20/km^{2} (51/sq mi)
- Time zone: UTC+01:00 (CET)
  - Summer (DST): UTC+02:00 (CEST)
- INSEE/Postal code: 2B261 /20247
- ^{1} French Land Register data, which excludes lakes, ponds, glaciers > 1 km^{2} (0.386 sq mi or 247 acres) and river estuaries.

Rogliano (French pronunciation: [ʁɔljano]; Italian: [roʎˈʎaːno]; Corsican: Ruglianu or Roglianu) is a commune in the French department of Haute-Corse, Corsica.

It was the seat of the former canton of Capobianco, which consisted of the 10 northernmost communes of Corsica. The people of Rogliano are called Roglianais, feminine Roglianaises.

Administratively, Rogliano replaces two historic communes, San-Columbano in the south and Chiapella in the north.

== Geography ==
Rogliano is 40 kilometers (25 mi) to the north of Bastia at the northeast corner of Cap Corse. The commune is actually a cluster of eight hamlets on the slopes and heights of Monte Poggio above Macinaggio Bay, the one from which the commune takes its name being located 7 kilometers (4 mi) up a winding road from the port, the Chemin de l'Imperatrice (Route D80), which is named after the empress, Eugénie. Forced to stop there by a storm in 1869 she found the road so bad she personally ordered it reconstructed. The other hamlets are Bettolacce, Olivo, Magna, Soprana, Vignale, Sottana and Campiano.

The commune borders the sea to the north and to the east. On the east coast is Macinaggio Bay, including a marina of 585 moorings for pleasure boats (of which 255 are for transients and the others for wintering over), a nautical club and a diving school. A little to the north, Tamarone Bay opens on the small Finocchiarola ("Fennel") Islands. They are protected by the Réserve Naturelle du Conservatoire du Littorala, a nature reserve, especially for safeguarding the rare Audouin's gull and Cory's shearwater, both of which breed there. It occupies about 654 hectares (1,620 acres).

The northeast corner of Cap Corse is accessible only by a footpath, the Sentier des Douaniers, heading north from the Plage de Tamarone. The coast is dotted with Genoese watchtowers: one on the outer Finocchiarola, one in the bay to the north, the Tour de Santa Maria, which sits in the water, and one on the 160 meters (520 ft) Pointe d'Agnello, the Tour d'Agnello, from which Elba can be seen in the distance. Small coves abound, which have traditionally been the entry points of smugglers, hence the name "path of the customs officers".

To the northwest the path traverses the Site Naturel de la Capandula with its sandy beaches and descends finally to the small fishing village of Barcaggio, which is also reached by a winding road. Off its coast is the island of Giraglia, the site of another Genoese watchtower and a modern (from an ancient) lighthouse marking the location of Cap Corse.

== Prehistory ==
North of the beach of Macinaggio at Point Coscia is a partially collapsed, wave-cut grotto, La Grotte de la Coscia, containing dateable sedimentary layers. In one deposit of the Last glacial period, a tumulus of crania and antlers of Cervus cazioti and various lagomorphs, rodents and other remains have been found with pebbles that could be interpreted as flakes and cores, fireplace sites and an ovate structure; that is, the most likely interpretation is that this is a site of the Middle Paleolithic, the first evidence of Early Stone Age occupation.

== History ==
=== The hillside ===
The name of the commune came from the Roman name Pagus Aurelianus, probably named after the good emperor, Aurelian. Macinaggio was a Roman naval base. The vines on the slopes have been shown to descend from Carthaginian ones, which would have predated the Romans, but the presence of the vines does not necessarily indicate the presence of the people.

At the top of the promontory of Trois Pointes on which the hamlets of Rogliano are located, at a height of 603 meters (1,978 ft) is a tower and the remains of Castle Da Mare, home of a Genoese family that ruled the region from the 12th to the 16th centuries. Ansaldo da Mare, a Genoese admiral, was awarded the island of Capraia for his services to Henry VI and Frederick II, becoming the Signor ("Lord") of Capraia and in 1199 obtained Rogliano and started the castle. In 1200 he was made the Count of Corsica. In 1246 he purchased the rights of the Signoria di San Colombano from one of the other Genoese lords and set up the capital at the castle, now the Castello di San Colombano. Ansaldo continued to add villages of Cap Corse to it until his death in 1254. For the next 300 years or so the Da Mare's lived in the castle and provided the Signor di San Colombano.

In 1523, the Genoese nobleman, Marchese Francesco Negrone, Protector of the Bank of Saint George, married Giorgetta, the daughter of Giacomo-Santo da Mare, reigning Signor di San Colombano. Here occurs a historical ambiguity. A descendant of the Negrone's, Héctor Andrés Negroni, a credible American historian, claims that the Signoria passed by dowry to the Negrone family at that point. However, in 1552 King Henry II of France annexed Corsica and in the resulting struggle Signor Giacomo-Santo da Mare di San Columbano brought forces to fight for Sampiero Corso, a Corsican in the employ of the French. When Corsica was returned to the Genoese by treaty in 1559 they struck back at those they considered traitors, destroying the castle at San Columbano, called then by a populace Castellacciu, "evil castle."

Francesco Negrone immediately began to build a new Castello near the old as Signor. Many questions are inherent in these circumstances. The modern Negrone makes no mention of the reason why the castle was destroyed if in fact the Negrone's were in it and were loyal to Genoa. Some accounts mention Giacomo-Santo I and Giacomo-Santo II. Giorgetta is typically made the daughter of Giacomo-Santo I, in which case she would have been the sister of Giacomo-Santo II, and the Negrone's were not sovereign yet as a result of the wedding. Some say she was the daughter of Giacomo-Santo II, but this does not solve the problem. Another account has her the co-Signor with Giacomo-Santo II, an unlikely scenario, as hereditary offices on Corsica were not generally split and the society was partilineal and patriarchal even though women were allowed to vote and to participate in the military. The most likely explanation is perhaps that in addition to burning the castle the Genoese disenrolled the traitor from his position and made Negroni Signor instead as husband of the next heir in line, Giorgetta.

The Negrone's remained loyal to Genoa. Pasquale Paoli was unable to take the place and conducted naval operations from the small coves on the northeast coast. Hence when France purchased Corsica from Genoa and Paoli defeated having gone into exile leaving Corsica to become part of France in 1770, the Negrone's were invited in 1772 to enroll as members of the French nobility. The Signoria lasted until 1789. The Negrone's perhaps because of their isolated location appear to have escaped the terror and resulting massacre that fell on the nobility of France and they even kept their property on the hill but they were no longer signorial. The tower and the castle became of antiquarian interest only. In 1943 the castle burned in a grass fire, but most of the Negrone's had emigrated by then to France or to Yauco, Puerto Rico, whence the American branch.

In the 18th and 19th century a rise in population forced a heavy emigration of people from Cap Corse, including Rogliano, to South America, Central America and the Caribbean. Those who became wealthy excavating for gold or planting and exporting coffee and sugar returned to Cap Corse to build colonial-style summer homes, now called the maisons d'Américains ("American houses").

=== The coastline ===
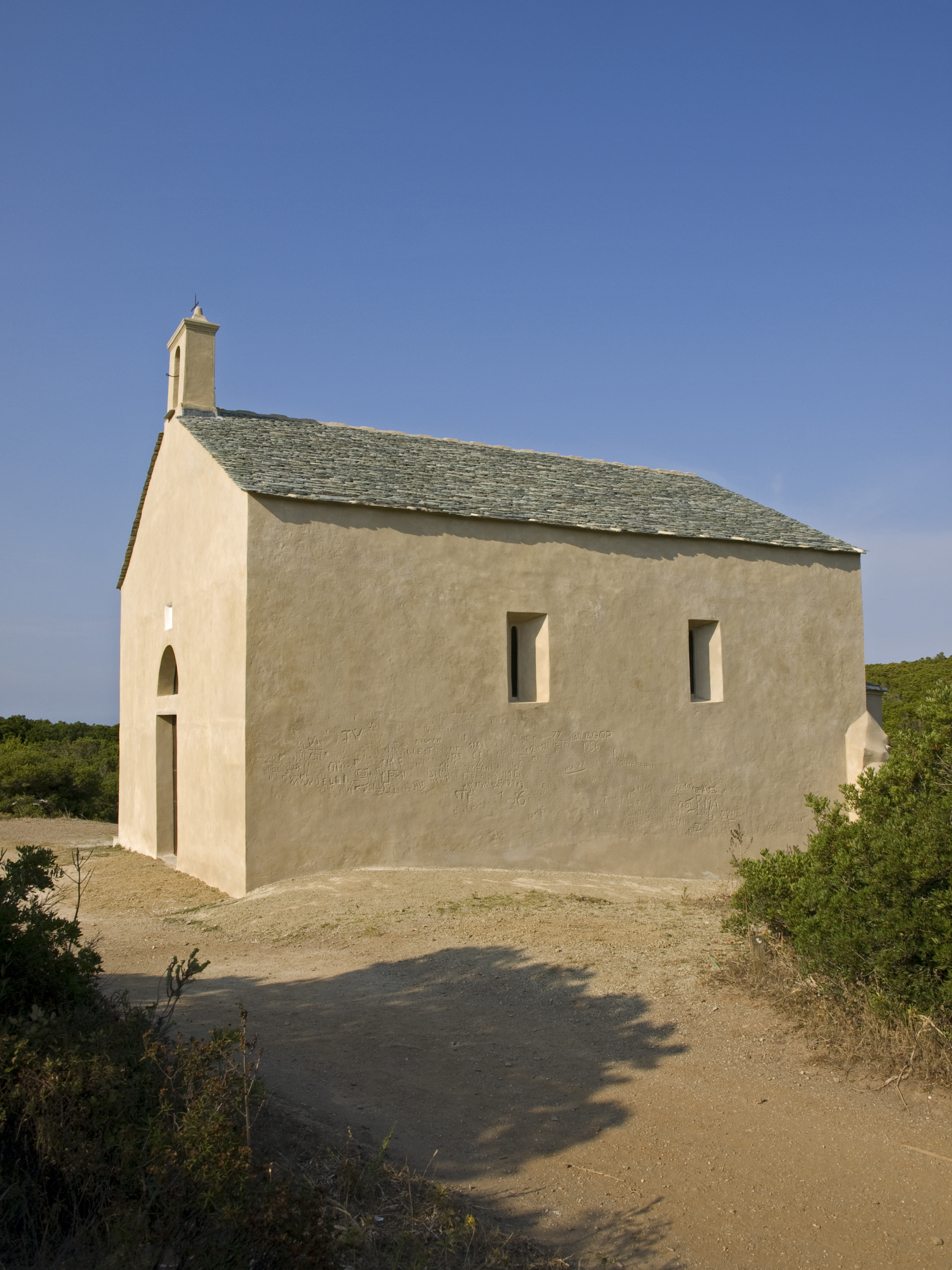
Chapelle Santa Maria

The harbor of Santa Maria features a church, the Chapelle Santa Maria, which was begun in the 6th century AD and rebuilt in the 10th and 12th centuries. The Genoese Tour de Santa Maria with its feet in the water dates to the 16th century. Pasquale Paoli utilized the harbor and the towers after 1761 because he could not capture Macinaggio from the Genoese. He did station his small fleet there and used it to capture the island of Capraia.

On Paoli's return from 21 years of exile in 1790, landing at Macinaggio he is said to have kissed the ground on which he stood and proclaimed that he left a slave but returned a free man. The words and event are commemorated by a plaque. Due to the course of history he was able to retain neither the sentiment nor the island residency.

Rogliano has served also as a commercial port and was the chief fishing port of Corsica in 1865.

== Population ==
Historical population
Year	Pop.	±% p.a.
1968	535	—
1975	495	−1.10%
1982	508	+0.37%
1990	480	−0.71%
1999	458	−0.52%
2007	539	+2.06%
2012	560	+0.77%
2017	563	+0.11%
2023	530	−1.00%
Source: INSEE

== Genoese towers ==
On the territory of Rogliano are four Genoese towers:

- Torra d'Agnellu
- Torra di Finochjarola
- Torra di Roglianu
- Torra di Santa Maria Chjapella

== Economy ==
The commune includes 40 hectares (100 acres) of vines, which are used in the production of wine.

A number of windmills are shared with the neighboring commune of Ersa. Featuring 20 Nordex propellers of 43 meters (141 ft) diameter.

== See also ==
- Communes of the Haute-Corse department
