= Giraglia =

Lighthouse, Corsica

Giraglia Lighthouse Cape Corse
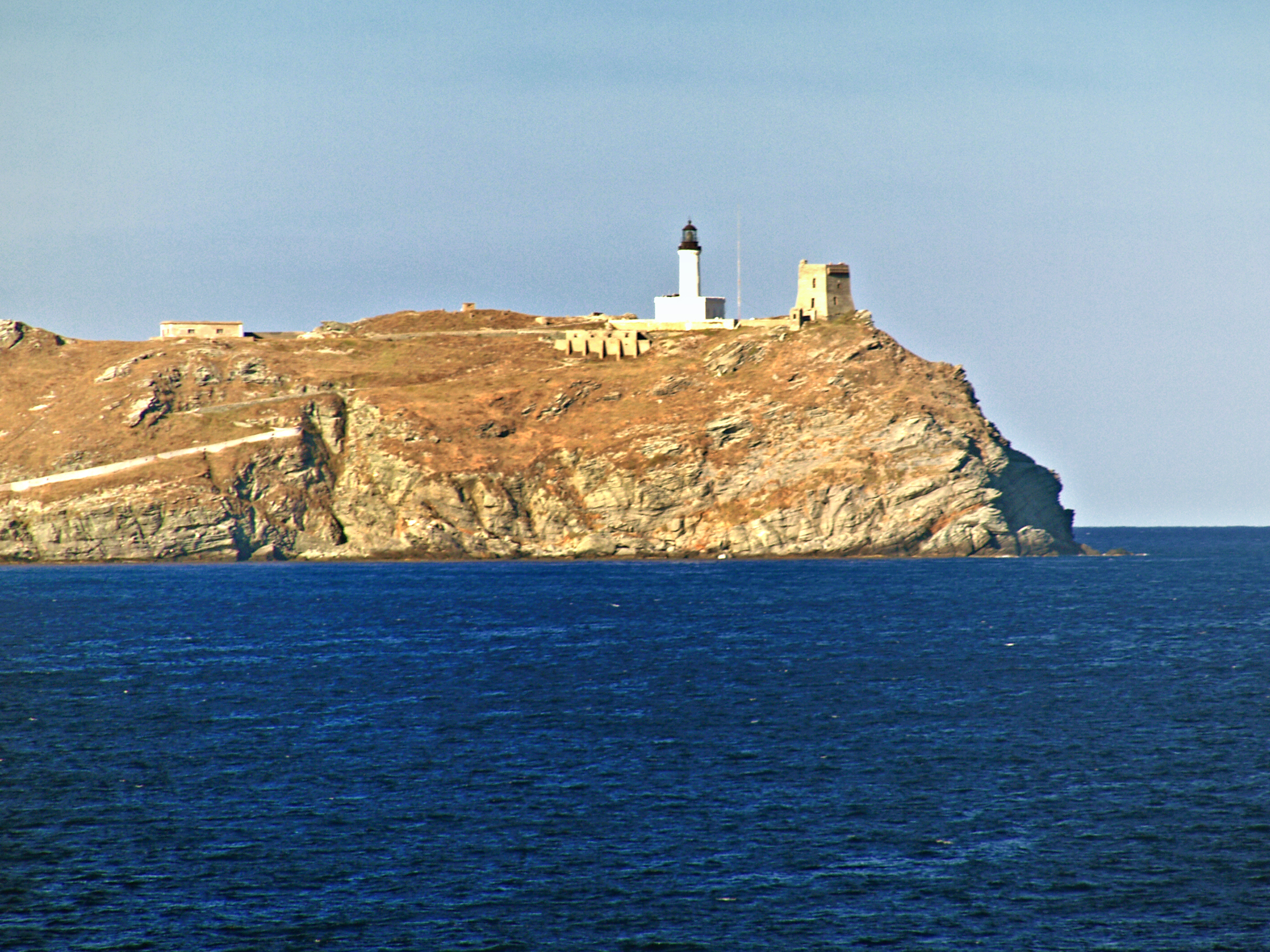
- Location: Giraglia Island, Corse; France
- Coordinates: 43.026804°N 9.405606°E

Tower
- Constructed: 1848
- Construction: stone tower
- Height: 25.80 metres (84.6 ft)
- Shape: cylindrical tower with balcony and lantern centered on a keeper’s house
- Markings: white tower, black balcony and lantern
- Heritage: classified historical monument

Light
- Focal height: 85.20 metres (279.5 ft)
- Range: 26 nautical miles (48 km; 30 mi)
- Characteristic: Fl W 5s.

Giraglia is a French island at the northern tip of Corsica in the Mediterranean Sea, known for its powerful lighthouse and for the Torra di Giraglia, a Genoese tower, both of which are official historical monuments of France.

The island is part of the commune of Ersa, but there are no settlements on the island. The closest settlements are Tollare, Ersa commune, and Barcaggio, Rogliano commune, on the main island of Corsica.

== The lighthouse ==
The Giraglia Lighthouse is an active lighthouse located on Giraglia Island, about one mile off Barcaggio on the northernmost tip of Cap Corse. It is opposite the mouth of the Acqua Tignese river. The lighthouse was first constructed in 1573 by the Genovese and has been rebuilt several times since. The current lighthouse was approved in 1838 based on a proposal by Léonce Reynaud and was inaugurated on January 1, 1848. It consists of a cylindrical tower 25.80 metres (84.6 ft) high, with balcony and lantern, rising from the centre of the keeper's house. Initially the light was a flash every 30 seconds, but since 1904 it is a white flash every 5 seconds. The lighthouse is fully automated and controlled by the Marine nationale in Bastia.

== Torra di Giraglia ==
Construction of this tower began in April 1584. It was one of a series of coastal defences constructed by the Republic of Genoa between 1530 and 1620 to protect against attacks by Barbary pirates. The design of the Giaglia tower is unusual in being square rather than round. The tower is owned by the French state and in 2008 was listed as one of the official Historical Monuments of France.

== Giraglia Rolex Cup ==
The Giraglia Rolex Cup, an annual keelboat regatta, was named for the island. The race starts in St. Tropez, France, passes through the Îles d'Hyères off the French coast near Toulon, then around Giraglia, and finishes off in Genoa, Italy, a total distance of 243 nautical miles (450 km; 280 mi).

== Bird colony ==
The island contains a small colony of Scopoli's shearwaters where around 25–30 pairs of birds breed in old rabbit holes.

== Gallery ==
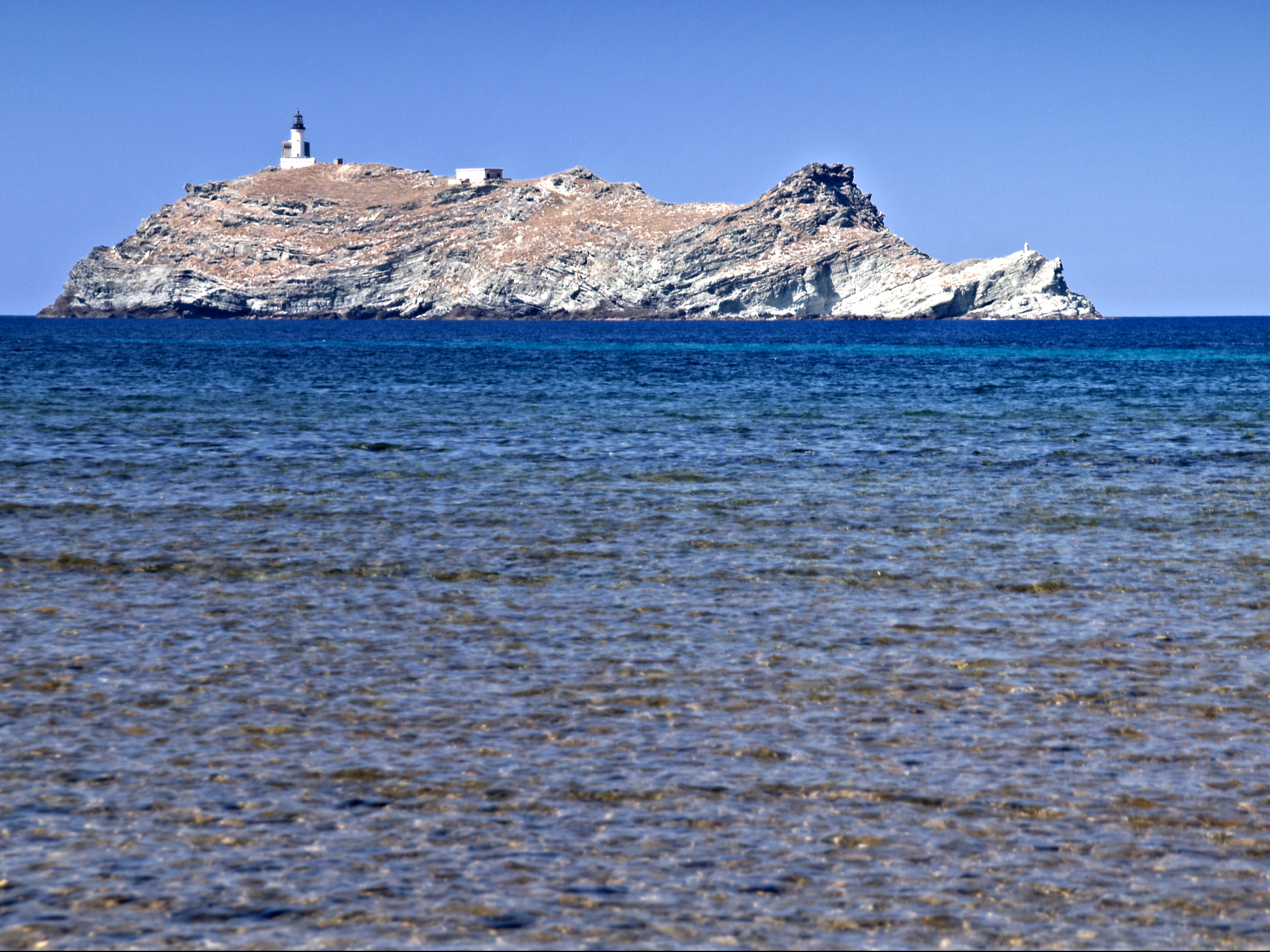
Giraglia

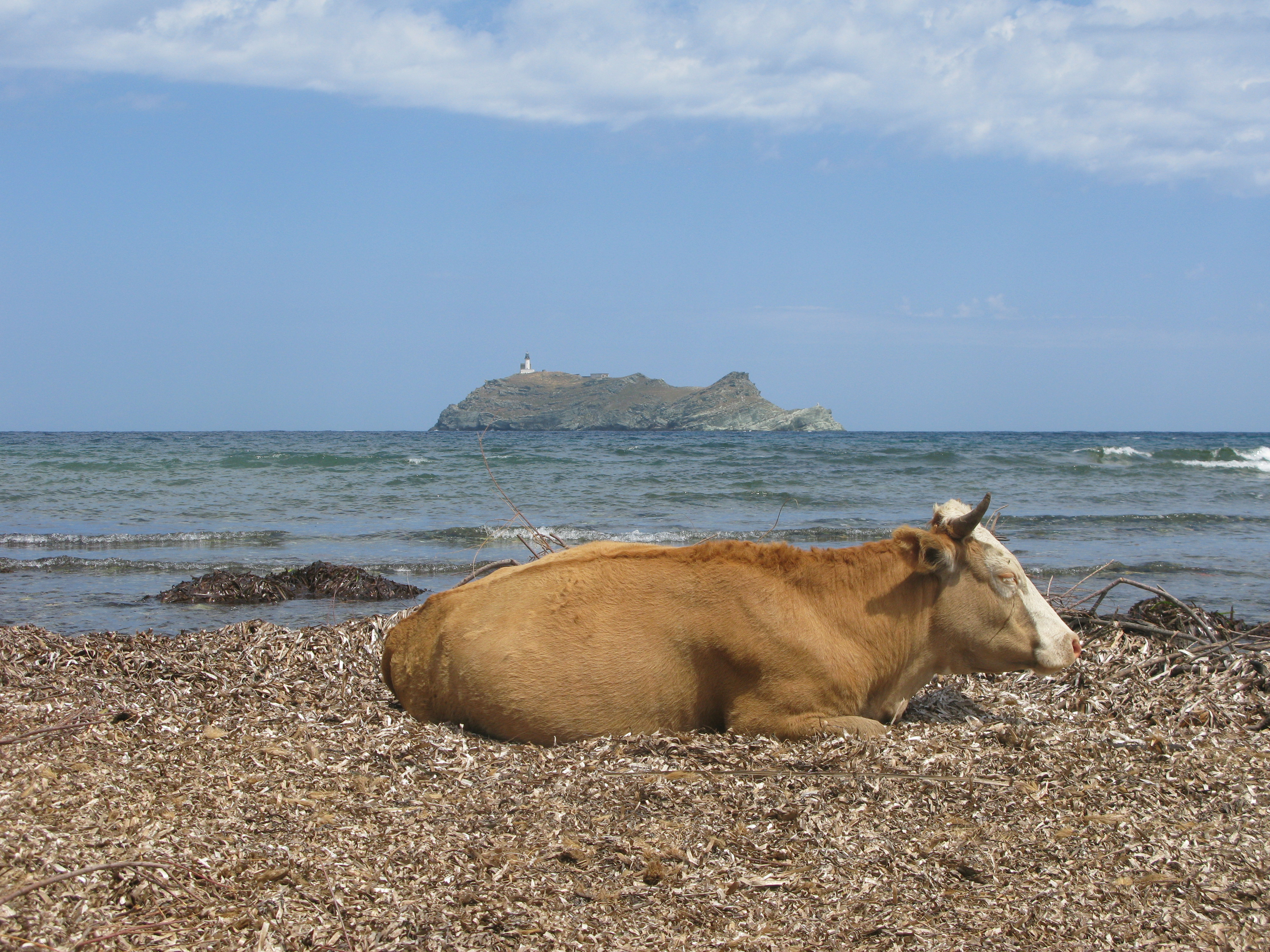
Giraglia seen from Barcaggio's beach

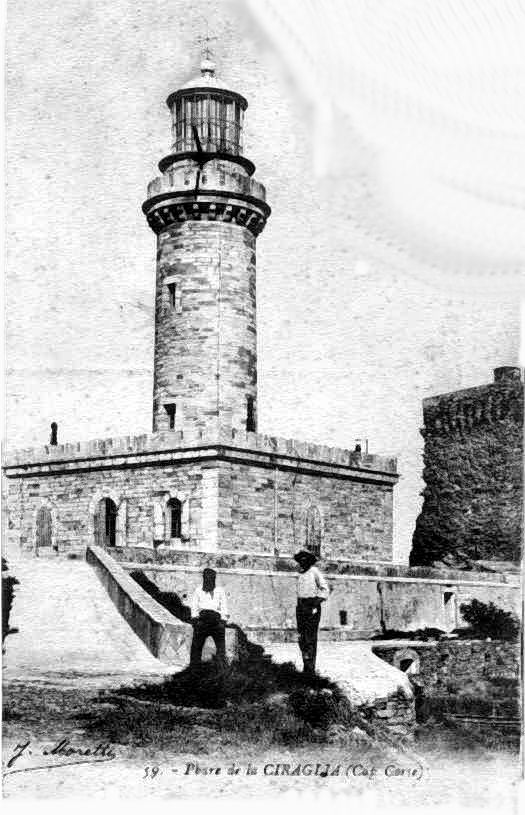
Lighthouse on Giraglia, circa 1900

== See also ==
- List of lighthouses in France
