= Yacht Club Italiano =

Sailing club in Italy

Coordinates: 44°25′N 08°55′E

- Burgee of the Yacht Club Italiano
- Formation: 1879; 147 years ago
- Legal status: active
- Purpose: advocate and public voice, educator and network for Recreational boating, and competitive sailors, coaches, volunteers and events
- Location: Genoa, Italy
- Official language: Italian, English, French
- Affiliations: Yacht Club de France
- Website: Yacht Club Italiano

The Yacht Club Italiano (YCI) is a yacht club in Genoa, Italy. Hosting some of the most prestigious regattas in Italy, it is a benchmark for Italian and international sailing.

== History ==
It was founded in 1879 and is one of the oldest sailing clubs in the Mediterranean. This club was bestowed Royal Patronage by HRH King Umberto I of Italy since its inception. This club has the privilege of the use of a special ensign, the "Bandiera della Marina Militare" (Italian Navy Flag).

Its first regatta took place in 1880 in the Bay of La Spezia with 177 yachts. Today, the club boasts over 1,200 members.

== Affiliation ==
The Yacht Club Italiano, together with the Yacht Club de France, runs the Giraglia Cup regatta from Saint Tropez, past Giraglia, the northernmost point of Corsica, to Genoa.

The club was from 2003 to 2007 the home to Luna Rossa Challenge, a syndicate that competes in America's Cup races.
