= Centuri, Haute-Corse =

Centuri
- Commune
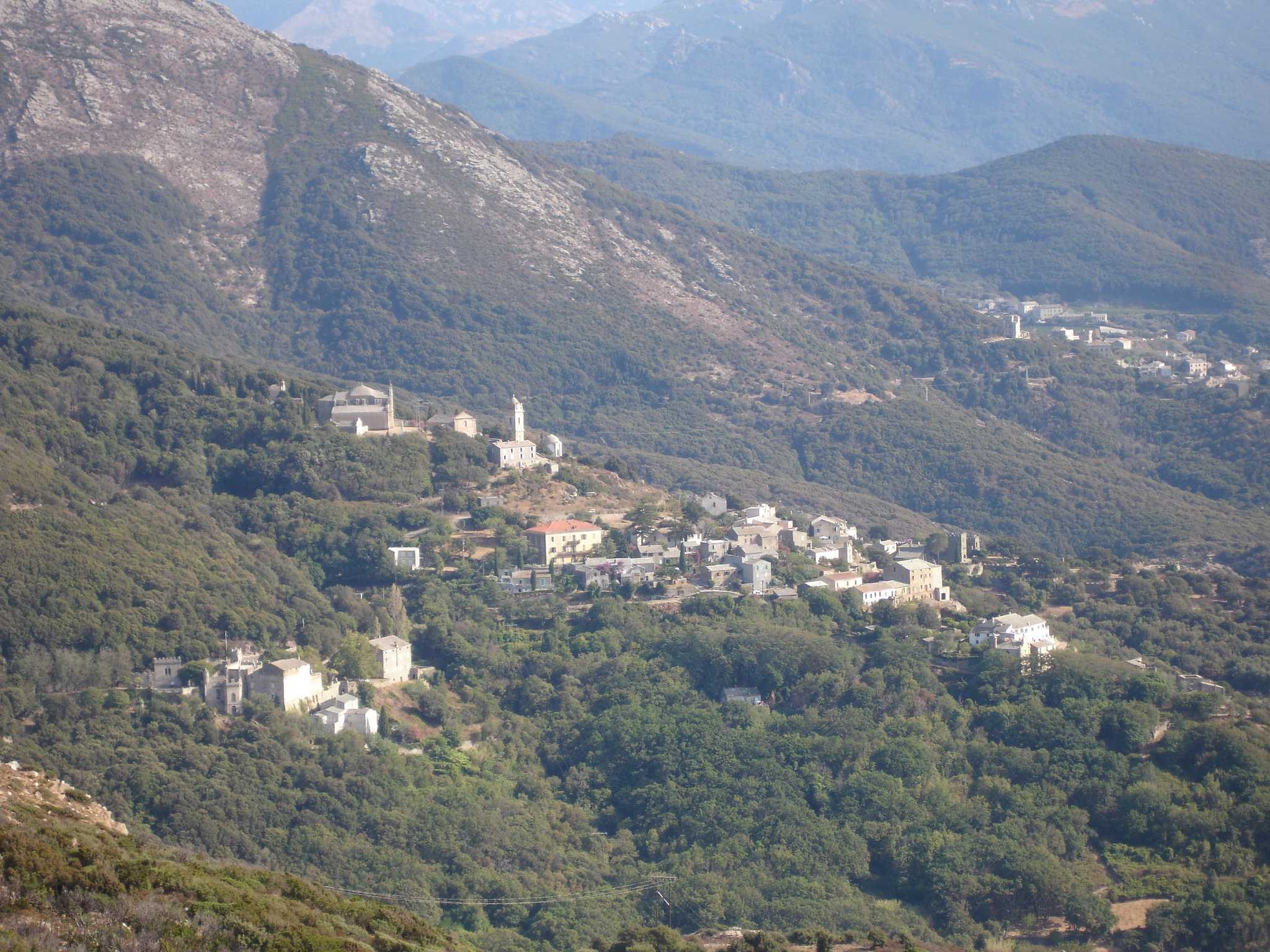
- Camera, part of the commune of Centuri
- Location of Centuri
- Location within France Location within Corsica
- Coordinates: 42°57′40″N 9°22′11″E
- Country: France
- Region: Corsica
- Department: Haute-Corse
- Arrondissement: Bastia
- Canton: Cap Corse
- Intercommunality: Cap Corse

Government
  - Mayor (2020–2026): Pierre Rimattei
- Area^{1}: 8.3 km^{2} (3.2 sq mi)
- Elevation: 150 m (490 ft)
- Highest elevation: 562 m (1,844 ft)
- Lowest elevation: 0 m (0 ft)
- Population (2023): 175
  - Density: 21/km^{2} (55/sq mi)
- Time zone: UTC+01:00 (CET)
  - Summer (DST): UTC+02:00 (CEST)
- INSEE/Postal code: 2B086 /20238
- ^{1} French Land Register data, which excludes lakes, ponds, glaciers > 1 km^{2} (0.386 sq mi or 247 acres) and river estuaries.

Centuri is a commune in the Haute-Corse department of France on the island of Corsica.

== Population ==
Historical population
Year	Pop.	±% p.a.
1968	257	—
1975	243	−0.80%
1982	195	−3.09%
1990	201	+0.38%
1999	229	+1.46%
2007	228	−0.05%
2012	211	−1.54%
2017	210	−0.09%
2023	175	−2.99%
Source: INSEE

== Sights ==
- Torra di Centuri

== See also ==
- Communes of the Haute-Corse department
