= NGC 184 =

Galaxy in the constellation Andromeda

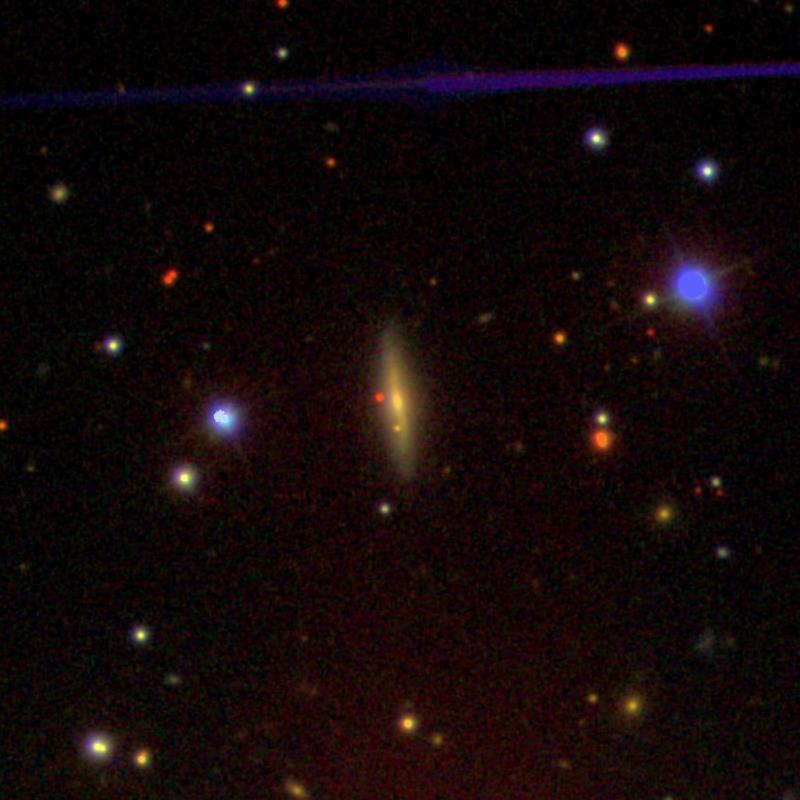
- NGC 184 as seen on SDSS

Observation data (J2000 epoch)
- Constellation: Andromeda
- Right ascension: 00^{h} 38^{m} 35.8^{s}
- Declination: +29° 26′ 51″
- Redshift: 0.017642
- Apparent magnitude (V): 15.62

Characteristics
- Type: S0/a
- Apparent size (V): 0.7' × 0.2'

Other designations
- CGCG 500-059, 2MASX J00383575+2926514, 2MASXi J0038358+292651, PGC 2309.

NGC 184 is a spiral galaxy located in the constellation Andromeda. It was discovered on October 6, 1883, by Édouard Stephan.

== See also ==
- NGC
- List of NGC objects (1–1000)
- List of NGC objects
- Galaxy
