= NGC 937 =

Barred spiral galaxy in the constellation Andromeda

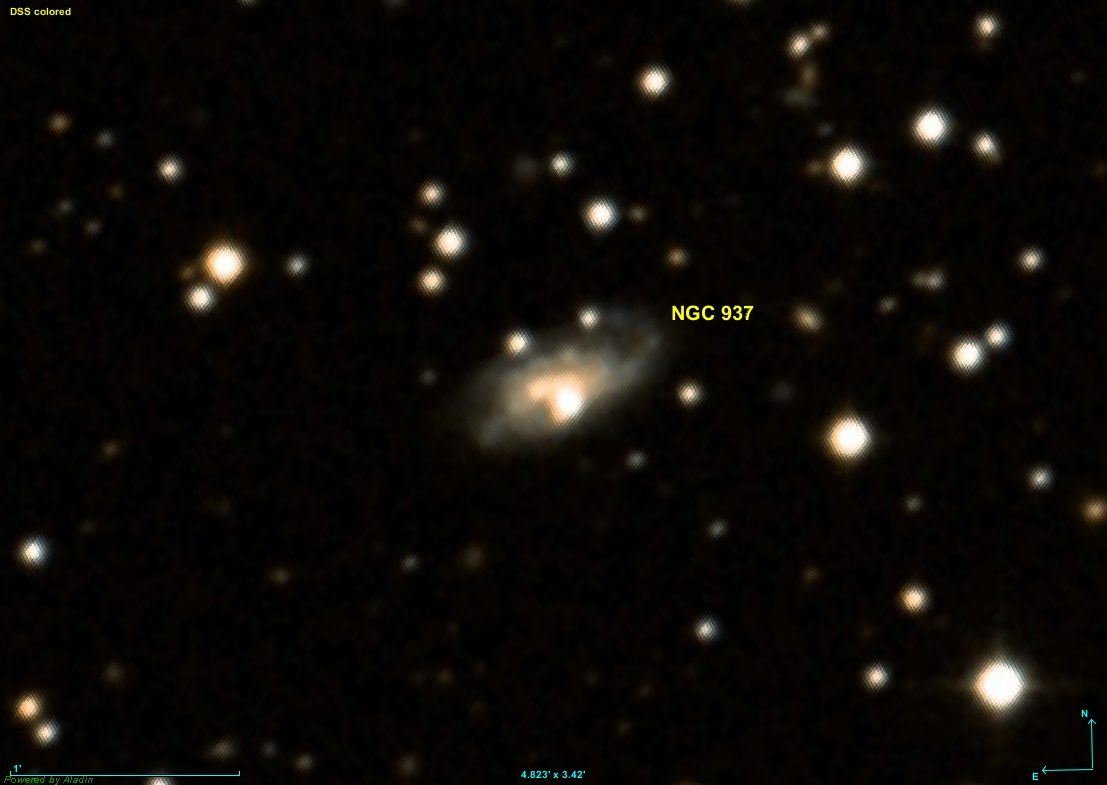
- DSS image of NGC 937

Observation data (J2000 epoch)
- Constellation: Andromeda
- Right ascension: 02^{h} 29^{m} 28.25^{s}
- Declination: +42° 14′ 58.8″
- Redshift: 0.018963
- Heliocentric radial velocity: 5631 km/s
- Distance: 260.9 ± 18.3 Mly (79.99 ± 5.61 Mpc)
- Apparent magnitude (B): 15.0

Characteristics
- Type: SBcd?

Other designations
- UGC 1961, MCG +07-06-024, PGC 9480

NGC 937 is a barred spiral galaxy located in the constellation Andromeda about 251 million light years from the Milky Way. It was discovered by the French astronomer Édouard Stephan on 12 December 1884.

== See also ==
- List of NGC objects (1–1000)
