= NGC 202 =

Lenticular galaxy in the constellation Pisces

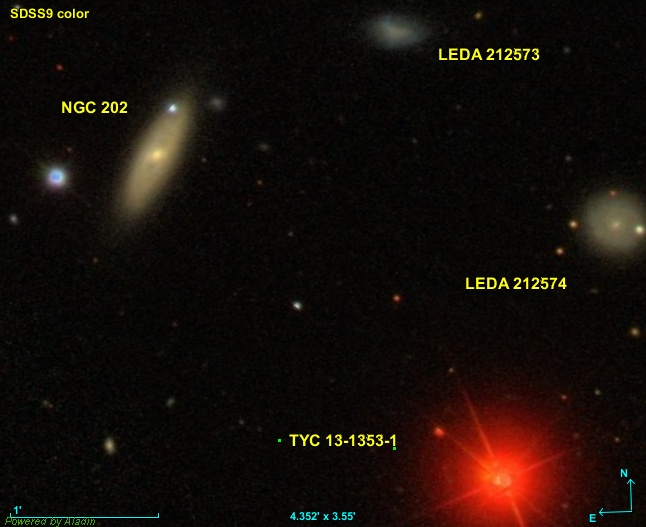
- SDSS image of NGC 202 and its surroundings

Observation data (J2000 epoch)
- Constellation: Pisces
- Right ascension: 00^{h} 39^{m} 39.8^{s}
- Declination: +03° 32′ 11″
- Redshift: 0.013316
- Apparent magnitude (V): 15.34

Characteristics
- Type: S
- Apparent size (V): 0.9' × 0.3'

Other designations
- UGC 00421, CGCG 383-062, MCG +00-02-113, 2MASX J00393985+0332105, PGC 2394.

NGC 202 is a lenticular galaxy located in the constellation Pisces. It was discovered on November 17, 1876 by French astronomer Édouard Stephan.

== See also ==
- Lenticular galaxy
- List of NGC objects (1–1000)
- Pisces (constellation)
