= NGC 181 =

Galaxy in the constellation Andromeda

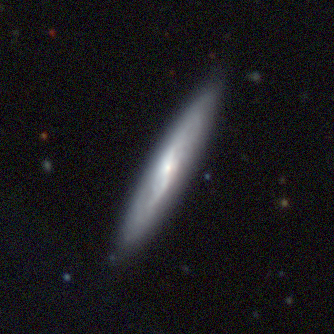
- DECam image of NGC 181

Observation data (J2000 epoch)
- Constellation: Andromeda
- Right ascension: 00^{h} 38^{m} 23.2^{s}
- Declination: +29° 28′ 21″
- Redshift: 0.018463
- Distance: 288.49 ± 53.27 Mly (88.450 ± 16.334 Mpc)
- Apparent magnitude (V): 15.40

Characteristics
- Type: S?
- Apparent size (V): 0.5' × 0.2'

Other designations
- CGCG 500-055, MCG +05-02-032, 2MASX J00382319+2928214, 2MASXi J0038232+292821, IRAS F00356+2911, PGC 2287.

NGC 181 is a spiral galaxy located in the constellation Andromeda. It was discovered on October 6, 1883 by Édouard Stephan.
