= NGC 5508 =

Spiral galaxy in the constellation Boötes

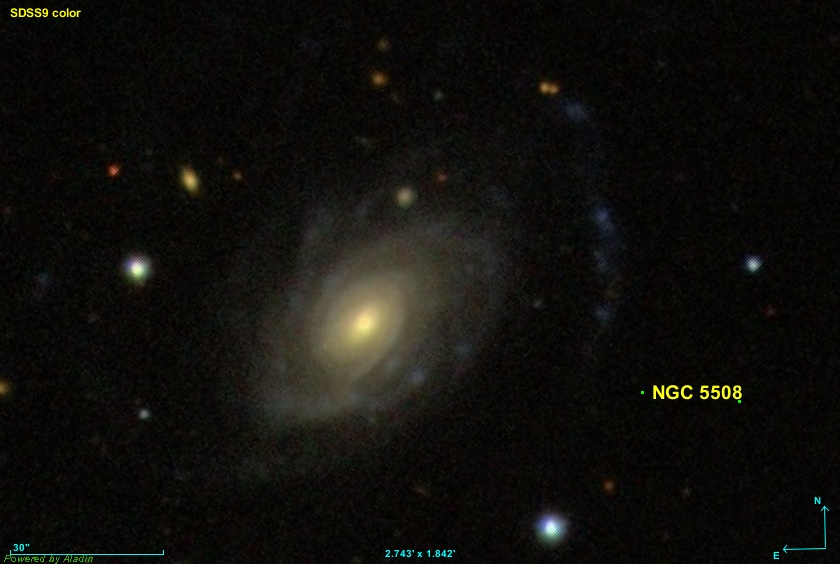
- The spiral galaxy NGC 5508.

Observation data (J2000 epoch)
- Constellation: Boötes
- Right ascension: 14^{h} 12^{m} 29.0^{s}
- Declination: 24° 38′ 08″
- Redshift: 0.038019 ± 0.000009
- Heliocentric radial velocity: 11,398 km/s
- Distance: 559 Mly (171.32 Mpc)
- Apparent magnitude (V): 13.8
- Apparent magnitude (B): 14.8
- Surface brightness: 13.66 mag/am

Characteristics
- Type: S0, S(rs)b? pec
- Size: 352,000 ly (107.99 kpc)
- Apparent size (V): 1.1' x 0.8'

Other designations
- PGC 50741, UGC 9094, MCG +04-34-002, CGCG 133-009

NGC 5508 is a very large and distant spiral galaxy located in the constellation Boötes. Its velocity relative to the cosmic microwave background is 11,615 ± 15 km/s, which corresponds to a Hubble's law of 171 ± 12 Mpc (~558 million light-years). It was discovered by French astronomer Édouard Stephan in 1882.

This galaxy is classified by all sources consulted, except Professor Seligman, as a lenticular galaxy. However, the image obtained from the SDSS survey clearly shows that it is a spiral galaxy.

According to the Simbad database, NGC 5508 is a LINER galaxy, i.e. a galaxy whose nucleus exhibits an emission spectrum characterized by broad lines of weakly ionized atoms.

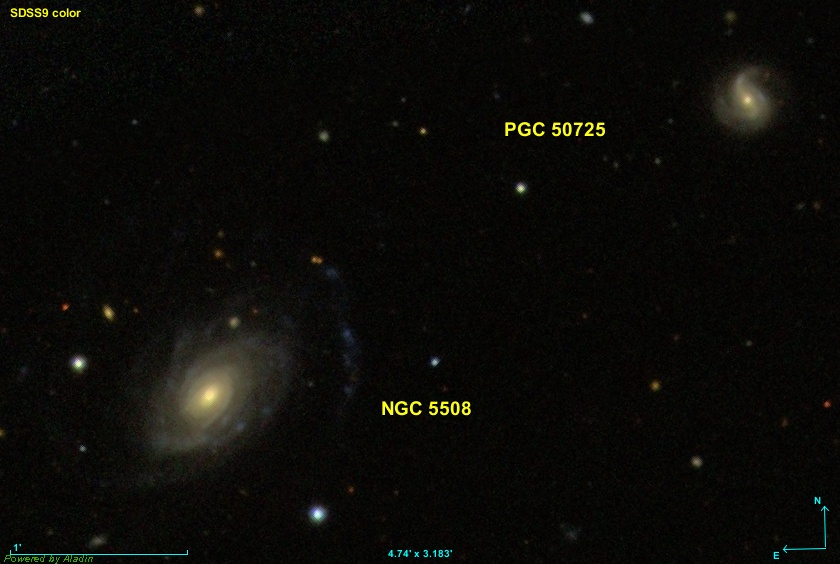
NGC 5508 and PGC 50725, an optical pair.

The Hubble distance of neighboring galaxy PGC 50725 is 237.51 ± 16.63 Mpc (~775 million light-years), well beyond NGC 5508. Although they appear as neighbors on the celestial sphere, they do not form a physical galaxy pair.

== See also ==
- List of NGC objects (5001–6000)
