= NGC 62 =

Barred spiral galaxy in the constellation Cetus

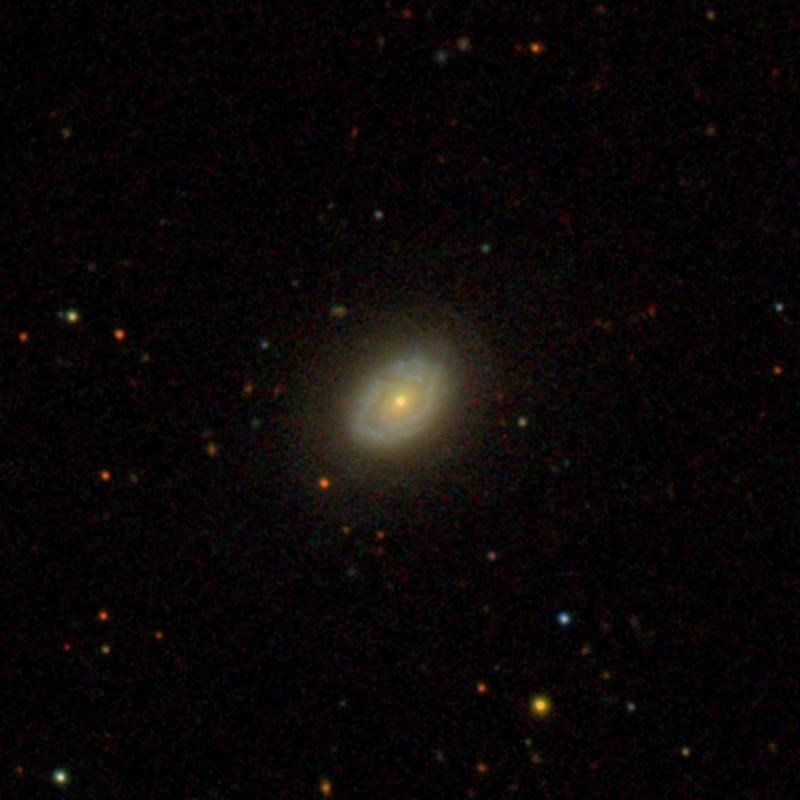
- SDSS image of NGC 62

Observation data (J2000 epoch)
- Constellation: Cetus
- Right ascension: 00^{h} 17^{m} 05.43026^{s}
- Declination: −13° 29′ 13.5546″
- Redshift: 0.021799
- Heliocentric radial velocity: 6464 km/s
- Distance: 213.5 Mly (65.46 Mpc)

Characteristics
- Type: (R)SB(r)a:

Other designations
- MCG -02-01-043, PGC 1125

NGC 62 is a barred spiral galaxy in the constellation Cetus. NGC 62 is its New General Catalogue designation. NGC 62 was discovered by Édouard Stephan from France on 8 October 1883. It has an apparent magnitude of 13.2.
