= NGC 605 =

Galaxy in the constellation Andromeda

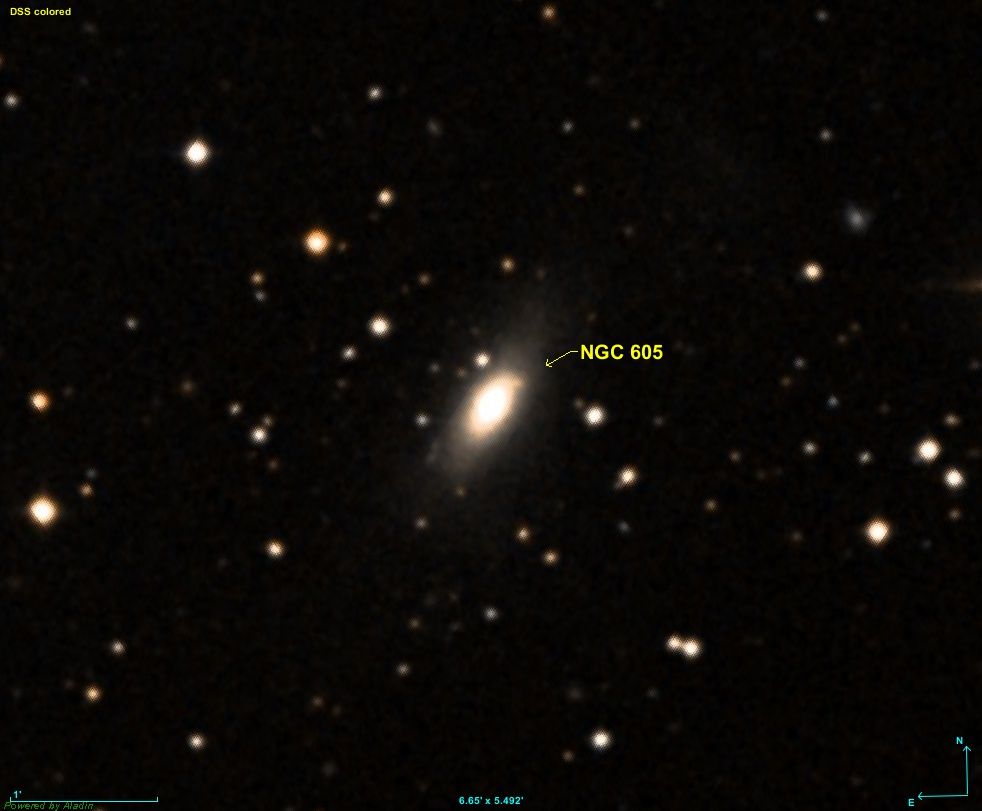
- NGC 605

Observation data (J2000 epoch)
- Constellation: Andromeda
- Right ascension: 01^{h} 35^{m} 02.34063^{s}
- Declination: +41° 14′ 53.3204″
- Redshift: 0.01705±0.00010
- Heliocentric radial velocity: 5,110.86±29.98
- Distance: 233.6 ± 16.4 Mly (71.63 ± 5.04 Mpc)

Characteristics
- Type: S0
- Size: ~154,800 ly (47.46 kpc) (estimated)
- Apparent size (V): 0.827 × 0.496 arcmin

Other designations
- UGC 1128, MCG +07-04-004, PGC 5891, CGCG 537-014

NGC 605 is a lenticular galaxy in the constellation Andromeda, which is about 234 million light-years from the Milky Way. It was discovered on October 21, 1881 by the French astronomer Édouard Jean-Marie Stephan.

SIMBAD lists NGC 605 as an active galaxy nucleus candidate.

One supernova has been observed in NGC 605: SN 2024nnu (type Ia, mag. 15.6).
