= NGC 38 =

Spiral galaxy in the constellation Pisces

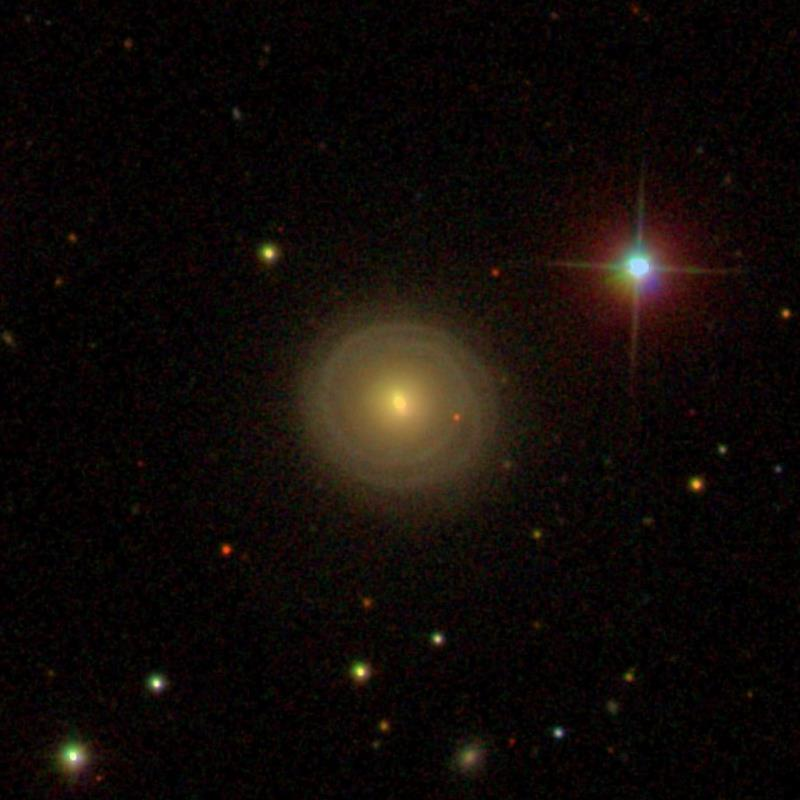
- SDSS image of NGC 38

Observation data (J2000 epoch)
- Constellation: Pisces
- Right ascension: 00^{h} 11^{m} 46.984^{s}
- Declination: −05° 35′ 10.37″
- Redshift: 0.026802
- Heliocentric radial velocity: 7927 ± 1 km/s
- Apparent magnitude (B): 13.5

Characteristics
- Type: (R)Sab:
- Apparent size (V): 1.4′ × 1.3′

Other designations
- MCG -01-01-047, PGC 818

NGC 38 (also known by the designations MCG-1-1-47 or PGC 818) is a spiral galaxy in the constellation Pisces. It was discovered on 30 September 1867 by Édouard Stephan.

== See also ==
- NGC
- List of NGC objects (1–1000)
- List of NGC objects
- Galaxy
