= 89 Julia =

Main-belt asteroid

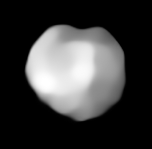
- VLT-SPHERE image of Julia. The large crater Nonza, half the diameter of the asteroid, is centered on the upper left quadrant.

Discovery
- Discovered by: Édouard Stephan
- Discovery date: 6 August 1866

Designations
- Pronunciation: /ˈdʒuːliə/
- Named after: Julia of Corsica
- Minor planet category: Main belt
- Adjectives: Julian /ˈdʒuːliən/

Orbital characteristics
- Epoch 31 July 2016 (JD 2457600.5)
- Uncertainty parameter 0
- Observation arc: 149.68 yr (54672 d)
- Aphelion: 3.0202 AU (451.82 Gm)
- Perihelion: 2.08017 AU (311.189 Gm)
- Semi-major axis: 2.55016 AU (381.499 Gm)
- Eccentricity: 0.18430
- Orbital period (sidereal): 4.07 yr (1487.5 d)
- Mean anomaly: 255.367°
- Mean motion: 0° 14^{m} 31.272^{s} / day
- Inclination: 16.128°
- Longitude of ascending node: 311.563°
- Argument of perihelion: 45.461°

Physical characteristics
- Dimensions: (165±4)×(142±5)×(115±4) km (178±4)×(160±2)×(124±6) km
- Mean diameter: 140±3 km
- Mass: (3.88±0.28)×10^{18} kg (Note: Calculated from its standard gravitational parameter GM = 0.259±0.019 km^{3}/s^{2}.)
- Mean density: 2.70±0.26 g/cm^{3}
- Synodic rotation period: 11.388336±0.000001 h (0.4745 day)
- Axial tilt: 128°
- Pole ecliptic longitude: 14° ± 2°
- Pole ecliptic latitude: −24° ± 2°
- Geometric albedo: 0.216 (calculated); 0.189±0.025
- Spectral type: S
- Apparent magnitude: 8.74 to 12.61
- Absolute magnitude (H): 6.60; 6.39
- Angular diameter: 0.18" to 0.052"

89 Julia is a large main-belt asteroid that was discovered by French astronomer Édouard Stephan on 6 August 1866. This was first of his two asteroid discoveries; the other was 91 Aegina. 89 Julia is believed to be named after Saint Julia of Corsica. A stellar occultation by Julia was observed on 20 December 1985.

The spectrum of 89 Julia shows the signature of silicate rich minerals with possible indications of an abundant calcic clinopyroxene component. It is classified as an S-type asteroid. The asteroid has an estimated diameter of 140±3 km. Photometry from the Oakley Observatory during 2006 produced a lightcurve that indicated a sidereal rotation period of 11.38±0.01 with an amplitude of 0.20±0.02 in magnitude.

== Nonza crater and Julian family ==
89 Julia is the parent body of the eponymous Julia family of asteroids. Observations of 89 Julia by the VLT's SPHERE instrument identified a 'highly probable' crater 70–80 km in diameter and 4.1±1.7 km deep in the southern hemisphere as the only visible possible source of the family. The crater was named Nonza by the discoverers, referring to the commune on the island of Corsica where Saint Julia was born. The excavated volume is on the order of 5,000 to 15000 km^{3}. It is hypothesized an impact 30 to 120 million years ago by another body approximately 8 kilometers in diameter may have created the collisional family.
