= Guglielmo Lorenzi =

Maltese corsair

- Born: 1734; Nonza, Corsica, Republic of Genoa
- Died: 14 January 1799 (aged 64); Valletta, Malta
- Military career
- Allegiance: Hospitaller Malta, Imperial Russian Navy
- Rank: Colonel
- Conflicts: Russo-Turkish War (1787-1792), Siege of Malta (1798–1800)

Guglielmo Lorenzi (Nonza, Corsica 1734 - Valletta, Malta January 14, 1799) was a Maltese corsair and naval officer of Corsican origin. He was one of the most prominent Maltese corsairs of the 18th century, during a time when the practice of corsairing in Malta, known as the Corso, was in general decline. He became an officer of the Imperial Russian Navy in 1789 and led a squadron in the Russo-Turkish War. After retiring to Malta at the end of this war in 1792, Lorenzi became one of the leaders of an abortive uprising against the French occupation of Malta and was executed by firing squad in Valetta in 1799.

== Biography ==
=== Early life and family ===
Guglielmo Lorenzi was born in 1734 in Nonza, in the region of Cap Corse in Corsica, which at that time was a possession of the Republic of Genoa. His maternal half-brothers came from a family of privateers, and one of them, Francesco di Natale, brought him to Malta in 1745 at the age of 11. In 1756 Guglielmo married Angela Gelfo, who also came from a corsairing family. Guglielmo and Angela had two daughters, both of whom died in infancy.

=== Maltese Corsair ===
The Maltese Corso - the seizure and plundering of the merchant vessels of the Muslim states of the Mediterranean, specifically those of the Ottoman Empire and the states of the Barbary Coast - was the primary "industry" of Hospitaller Malta until the late 18th century, involving a large portion of the Maltese population. As Christian European states became more involved in trade with the Ottoman Levant, however, Christian states put pressure on the Knights to restrict the Corso, and corsairing declined significantly during the 18th century. Nevertheless, the Corso did not disappear, and it was increasingly carried out from Malta by sailors and captains of other nationalities sailing under a variety of different flags. Corsicans played a leading role in the Maltese Corso during this final century of its existence.

Lorenzi initially sailed as a corsair under the flag of Monaco. He first appears sailing into Marsamxett in 1753 as the prize captain of a Greek ship, and captained a felucca under the Monagasque flag in 1756 which brought in plunder worth 5,000 piastres. From 1757 he sailed under the Maltese flag, sailing a flotilla of two galliots which had been commissioned and outfitted by Grand Master Manuel Pinto da Fonseca. His activities in the following years are not well-documented, but in 1767 he reappears as the captain of a felucca cruising in the Aegean Sea. He was entrusted with increasingly larger ships thereafter. In 1778 Lorenzi, in command of a xebec, captured two ships off the coast of Anatolia. Lorenzi took 98 captives back to Malta, one of the largest captures of the 18th century Corso and amounting to two-thirds of all slaves brought into Malta by corsairs in that year.

By 1779 Lorenzi captained a frigate, of which he was also the owner. In 1783, in command of the frigate La Vittoriosa, Lorenzi defeated and captured a larger Ottoman warship which had been dispatched to hunt him down, for which Grand Master Emmanuel de Rohan-Polduc gave him a gold medal. This victory was reported to St. Petersburg by the Russian envoy in Constantinople, which may have been how Lorenzi first reached the attention of Russian authorities. Grigory Krayevsky, a Russian diplomat who visited Malta as an interpreter to the Russian ambassador to Naples in 1785, described him as the "glorious corsair Guglielmo."

=== Russian Service ===
In 1787, war broke out between Russia and the Ottoman Empire. Lorenzi was already at sea in that year commanding the frigate La Fama of 54 guns, one of the largest corsair vessels ever launched from Malta, and managed to capture a xebec carrying the Ottoman governor of Rhodes. The Russian government initially planned on sending a fleet from the Baltic to the Mediterranean, but the outbreak of war against Sweden in 1788 prevented this, and forced the Russians to rely on privateers and corsairs to harass Ottoman shipping and interrupt the food supply to Constantinople.

In the winter of 1788-9 the Russians organized a "state flotilla" in Syracuse, which was expected to coordinate with a flotilla of Greek privateers under the command of the Greek pirate Lambros Katsonis. In April of 1789 Lorenzi entered Russian service and was placed in command of the state flotilla as "Lieutenant Colonel of Her Imperial Majesty's Fleet and Chief of Her Squadron in the Mediterranean." Katsonis, however, refused to follow orders to act jointly with Lorenzi and the two flotillas did not effectively coordinate. Nevertheless, over the course of the war Lorenzi and his flotilla defeated a Turkish squadron near Syros and cruised off the coasts of Egypt, Syria, and Rhodes. After the end of the war in 1792 he was promoted to the rank of colonel, awarded the Order of St. George, and dismissed from Russian service. He thereafter returned to Malta and retired from corsairing.

=== 1799 Uprising ===
In June of 1798, soldiers of the French Republic under the command of Napoleon Bonaparte invaded and seized control of the Maltese islands from the Order of Saint John. The French occupation was unpopular and triggered an uprising. While the rebels, organized into the National Congress Battalions, took control of the Maltese countryside and the British Navy began a blockade of the islands in the following month, Valletta and its suburbs remained under French control.

As the Siege of Malta continued, anti-French Maltese within Valletta began planning an uprising to take control of the city from within. The overall leader of the plot was the priest Mikiel Xerri (or "Michael Scerri"), but the retired corsair Lorenzi was selected as the plot's military leader. The conspirators planned to coordinate their uprising with an assault by insurgents outside the walls on January 12 of 1799. The day before the planned uprising, however, a Genoese ship slipped through the blockade and brought news to the garrison of recent French victories in Italy, which caused the French soldiers to raise a cheer. The Maltese insurgents outside the walls thought this was the signal for the attack, and this premature assault failed without the assistance of the conspirators within Valletta.

Lorenzi still hoped that success might be achieved and delayed the uprising for a day, but the conspiracy was betrayed by one of the plotters who gave the French the names of those involved. The conspirators were rounded up and arrested, and 43 of them were ultimately sentenced to death. Lorenzi was among the first to be shot, on January 14 (or 15th), while Xerri was executed on the 17th.

== Sources ==
- Cavaliero, Roderic (1959). "The Decline of the Maltese Corso in the XVIIIth Century". Melita Historica. 2 (4). Malta Historical Society.
- Fontenay, Michel (1998). "Dans le sillage de Bonaparte : une conspiration d'un corsaire, natif du cap Corse, contre l'occupation française de Malte". Cahiers de la Méditerranée (in French). 57 (57): 153–172. doi:10.3406/camed.1998.1232.
- Gauci, Liam; Frumin, Mitia (2015). ""Начальник эскадры Ея И.В. в Средиземном море": материалы к биографии мальтийского корсара Гульельмо Лоренци" ["Her Imperial Majesty's Squadron Commander in the Mediterranean" - materials for the biography of Maltese corsair Captain Guglielmo Lorenzi]. Век Просвещения (in Russian). Institute of World History of the Russian Academy of Sciences.
- Gregory, Desmond (1996). Malta, Britain, and the European Powers, 1793-1815. Fairleigh Dickinson Univ Press. ISBN 0838635903.
- Grima, Joseph (January 13, 2019). "It happened this month: The anti-French plot of 1799: Maltese patriots' futile sacrifice". Times of Malta.
- Leikin, Julia (November 2017). ""The Prostitution of the Russian Flag": Privateers in Russian Admiralty Courts, 1787–98". Law and History Review. 35 (4): 1049–1081. doi:10.1017/S0738248017000402. JSTOR 26564556.
- Serpentini, Antoine (2006). Dictionnaire historique de la Corse [Historical Dictionary of Corsica] (PDF) (in French). Albiana. pp. 569–571. ISBN 9782846980685.
