= NGC 1233 =

Galaxy in the constellation Perseus

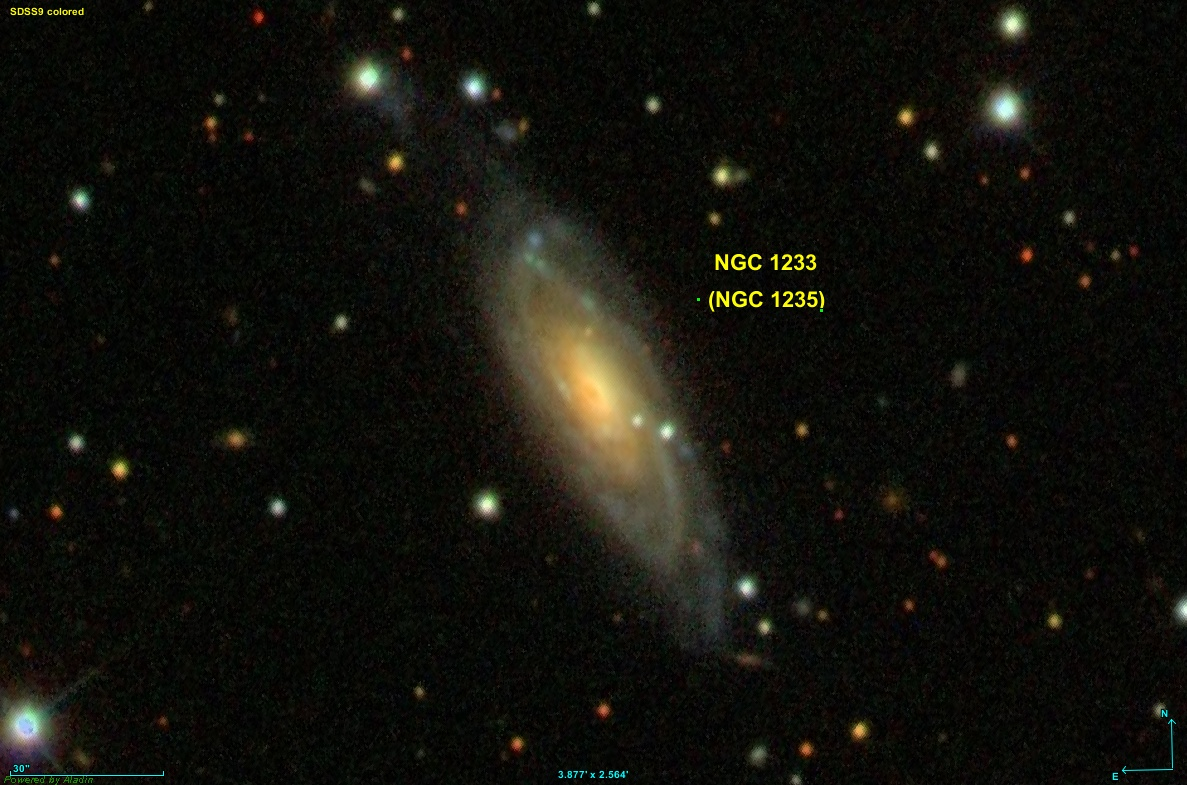
- NGC 1233 imaged by SDSS

Observation data (J2000 epoch)
- Constellation: Perseus
- Right ascension: 03^{h} 12^{m} 33.1263^{s}
- Declination: +39° 19′ 07.993″
- Redshift: 0.014640
- Heliocentric radial velocity: 4389 ± 7 km/s
- Distance: 202.9 ± 14.2 Mly (62.22 ± 4.36 Mpc)
- Group or cluster: NGC 1207 Group (LGG 83)
- Apparent magnitude (V): 13.2

Characteristics
- Type: Sb
- Size: ~141,400 ly (43.35 kpc) (estimated)
- Apparent size (V): 1.8′ × 0.6′

Other designations
- IRAS 03093+3907, 2MASX J03123310+3919081, NGC 1235, UGC 2586, MCG +06-08-003, PGC 11955, CGCG 524-065

NGC 1233 (also listed as NGC 1235) is a spiral galaxy in the constellation of Perseus. Its velocity with respect to the cosmic microwave background is 4218 ± 14 km/s, which corresponds to a Hubble distance of 202.9 ± 14.2 Mly (62.22 ± 4.36 Mpc). In addition, three non redshift measurements give a distance of 211.35 ± 2.14 Mly (64.800 ± 0.656 Mpc). The galaxy was discovered by French astronomer Édouard Stephan on 10 December 1871. It is also thought to have been observed by Lewis Swift on 21 October 1886, and later listed as NGC 1235.

== Supernovae ==
Three supernovae have been observed in NGC 1233:

- SN 2009lj (Type Ic, mag. 19) was discovered by the Lick Observatory Supernova Search (LOSS) on 13 November 2009.
- SN 2017lf (Type Ia, mag. 17.3) was discovered by the Tsinghua-NAOC Transient Survey (TNTS) on 22 January 2017.
- SN 2022bqi (Type II, mag. 17) was discovered by Giancarlo Cortini on 7 February 2022.

== NGC 1207 Group ==
NGC 1233 is a part of the 3 member NGC 1207 group (also known as LGG 83). The other two galaxies in the group are NGC 1207 and UGC 2604.

== See also ==
- List of NGC objects (1001–2000)
