= NGC 995 =

Galaxy in the constellation Andromeda

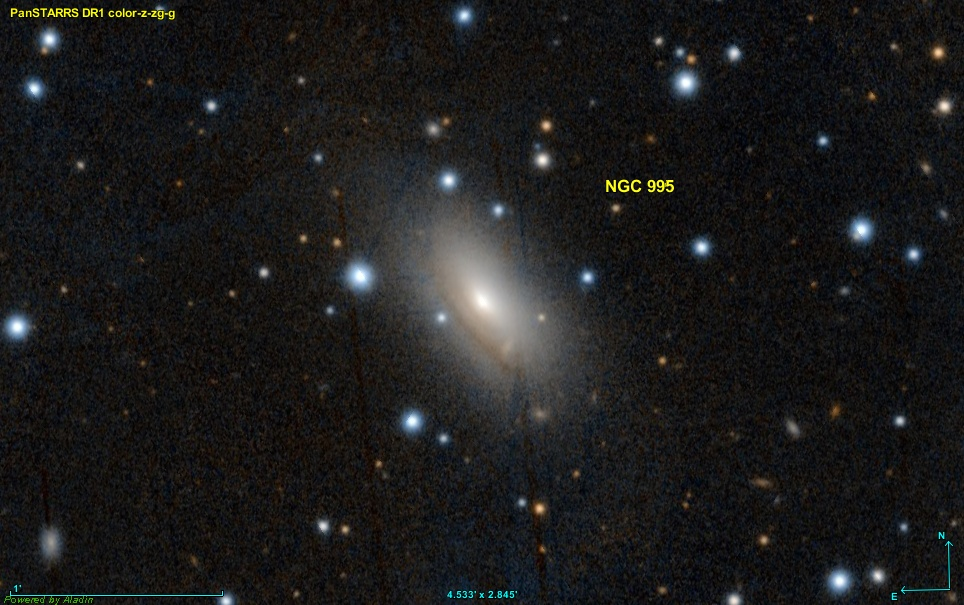
- Pan-STARRS image of NGC 995

Observation data (J2000 epoch)
- Constellation: Andromeda
- Right ascension: 02^{h} 38^{m} 32.05009^{s}
- Declination: +41° 31′ 45.3471″
- Redshift: 0.01339
- Heliocentric radial velocity: 3987 km/s
- Distance: 177.7 Mly (54.49 Mpc)
- Apparent magnitude (B): 14.9

Characteristics
- Type: S0

Other designations
- UGC 2118, MCG +07-06-044, PGC 10008

NGC 995 is a lenticular galaxy located in the constellation Andromeda about 178 million light years from the Milky Way. It was discovered by the French astronomer Édouard Stephan on 8 December 1871.

== See also ==
- List of NGC objects (1–1000)
