= NGC 229 =

Galaxy in the constellation Andromeda

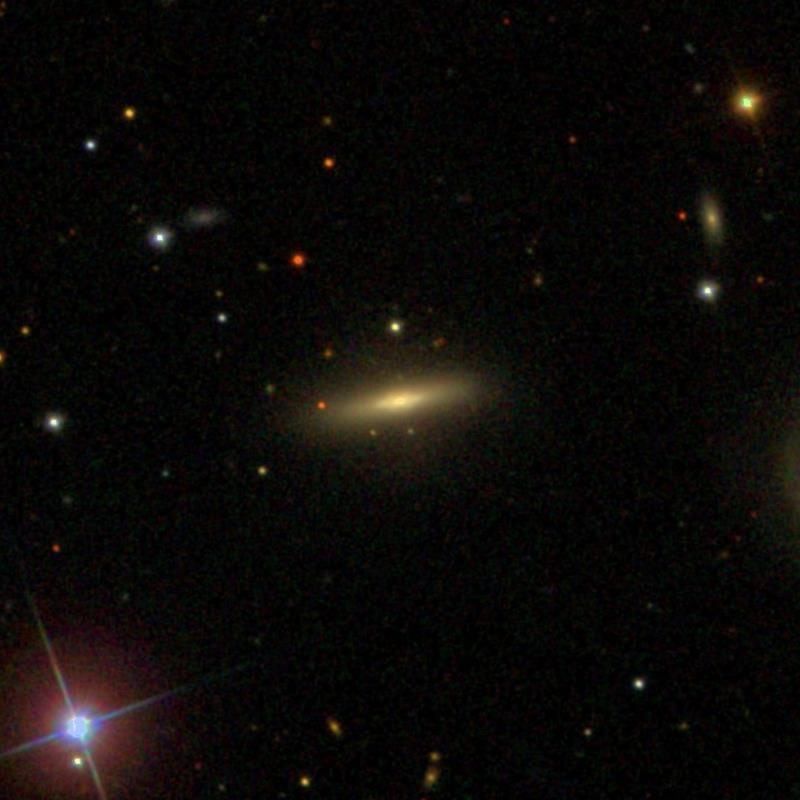
- SDSS image of NGC 229

Observation data (J2000 epoch)
- Constellation: Andromeda
- Right ascension: 00^{h} 43^{m} 04.6^{s}
- Declination: +23° 30′ 33″
- Redshift: 0.024514
- Apparent magnitude (V): 14.7

Characteristics
- Type: S0
- Apparent size (V): 0.8' × 0.3'

Other designations
- CGCG 479-064, MCG +04-02-049, 2MASX J00430463+2330328, 2MASXi J0043046+233032, PGC 2577.

NGC 229 is a lenticular galaxy located in the constellation Andromeda. It was discovered on October 10, 1879, by Édouard Stephan.
