= NGC 1101 =

Galaxy in the constellation Cetus

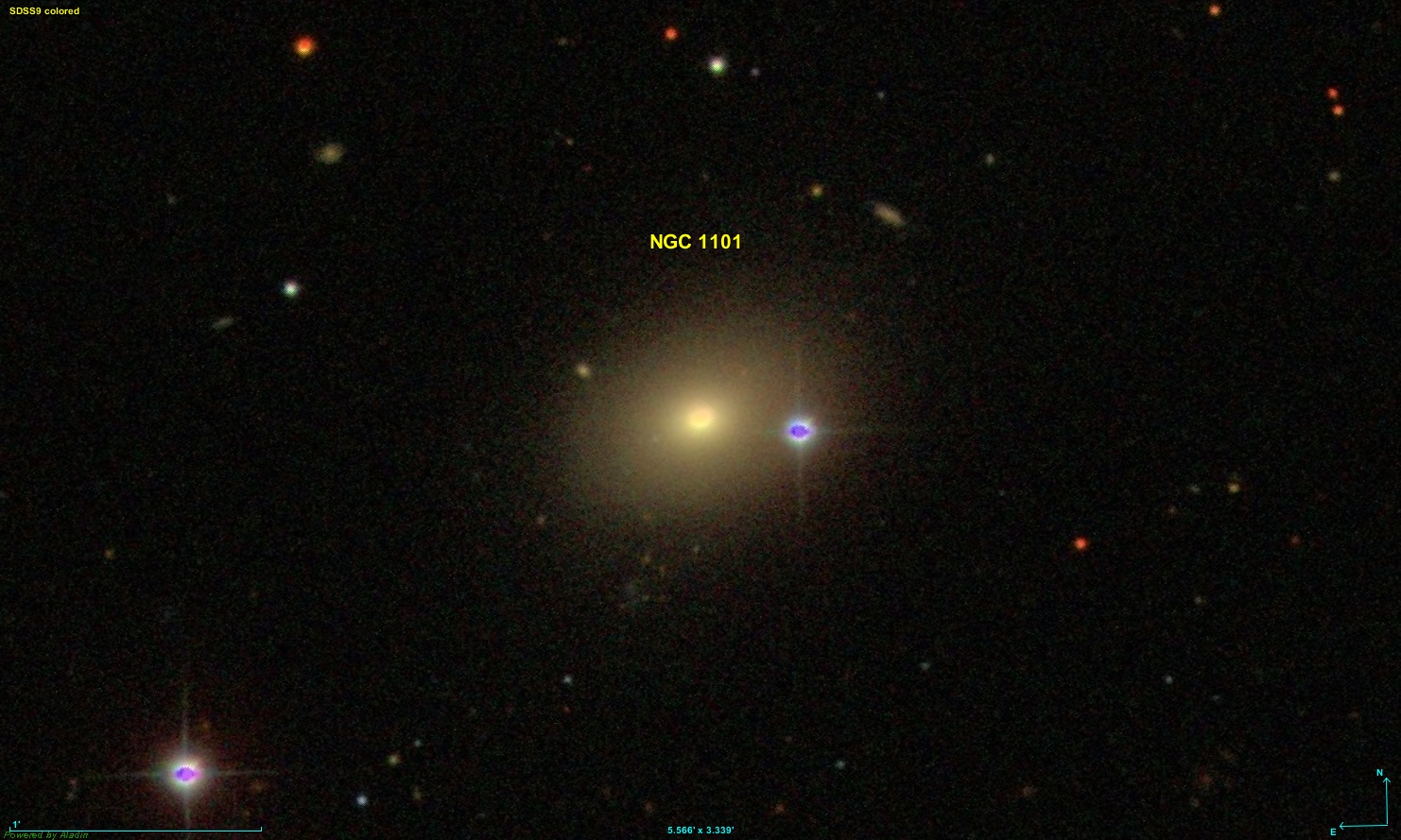
- SDSS image of NGC 1101

Observation data (J2000 epoch)
- Constellation: Cetus
- Right ascension: 02^{h} 48^{m} 14.8^{s}
- Declination: +04° 34′ 40.8″
- Redshift: 0.023660
- Heliocentric radial velocity: 7,093 km/s
- Distance: 331 Mly (101.39 ± 7.10 Mpc)
- Apparent magnitude (V): 13.0
- Apparent magnitude (B): 14.0

Characteristics
- Type: S0
- Size: 109,000 ly (estimated 33.27 kpc)
- Apparent size (V): 1.3' x1.0'

Other designations
- PGC 10613, UGC 2278, MCG +01-08-003, CGCG 415-011, NPM1G +04.0092

NGC 1101 is a lenticular galaxy in the constellation Cetus, and is an estimated 331 million light-years away from Earth. It was discovered on 22 November 1876 by French astronomer Edouard Stephan, who described it as "very faint, small, round with a brighter middle".

NGC 1101 contains a flat-spectrum radio source and it has a HI line width.

To date, a non-redshift measurement gives the galaxy a distance of 81,700 megaparsecs (Mpc) or equal to ~266 million light-years. This value is just outside the Hubble distance values. According to NASA/IPAC database, the diameter of NGC 1101 is calculated to be around 41.3 kiloparsecs (~135,000 light-years) if the Hubble distance were to calculate it.

== See also ==
- List of NGC objects (1001–2000)
