= NGC 1159 =

Galaxy in the constellation Eridanus

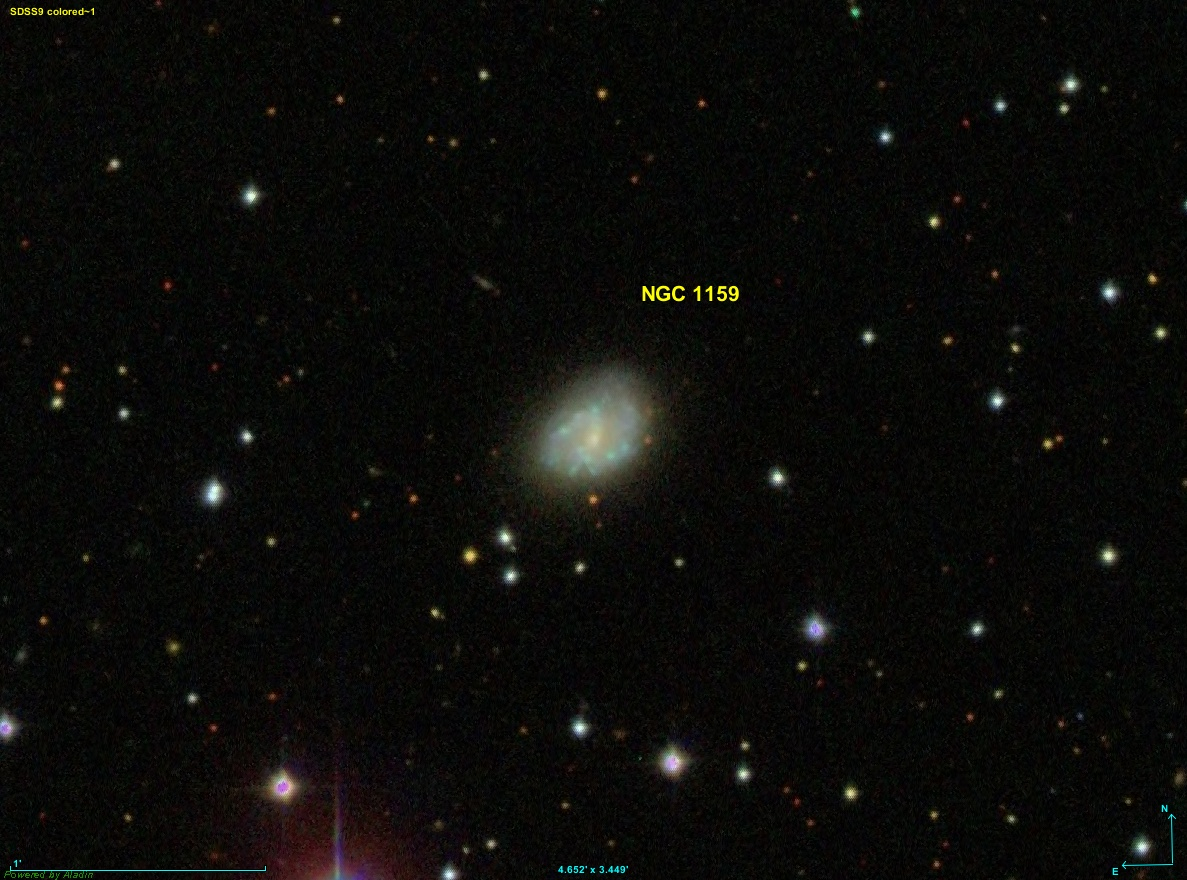

Observation data (J2000 epoch)
- Constellation: Perseus
- Right ascension: 02h 58m 06.6s
- Declination: −15° 07′ 05″
- Redshift: 0.010885
- Apparent magnitude (V): 14.8

Characteristics
- Type: Sb (Spiral)
- Apparent size (V): 0.6′ × 0.3′

Other designations
- PGC 11283, UGC 2467, CGCG 540-023

NGC 1159 is a spiral galaxy located in the constellation Perseus. It was discovered by astronomer Édouard Stephan on December 2, 1883.

== Description ==
The galaxy has a redshift of 0.008763, indicating it is moving away from Earth at a velocity of 2616 km/s. The galaxy's approximate distance from the Milky Way is 62.9 million light-years (19.3 megaparsecs).

The apparent magnitude of NGC 1159 is 14.2 in the blue band, and it has an angular size of 0.48 × 0.4 arcminutes. The galaxy's morphology classification is Sc, signifying a late-type spiral galaxy.
