= NGC 906 =

Galaxy in the constellation Andromeda

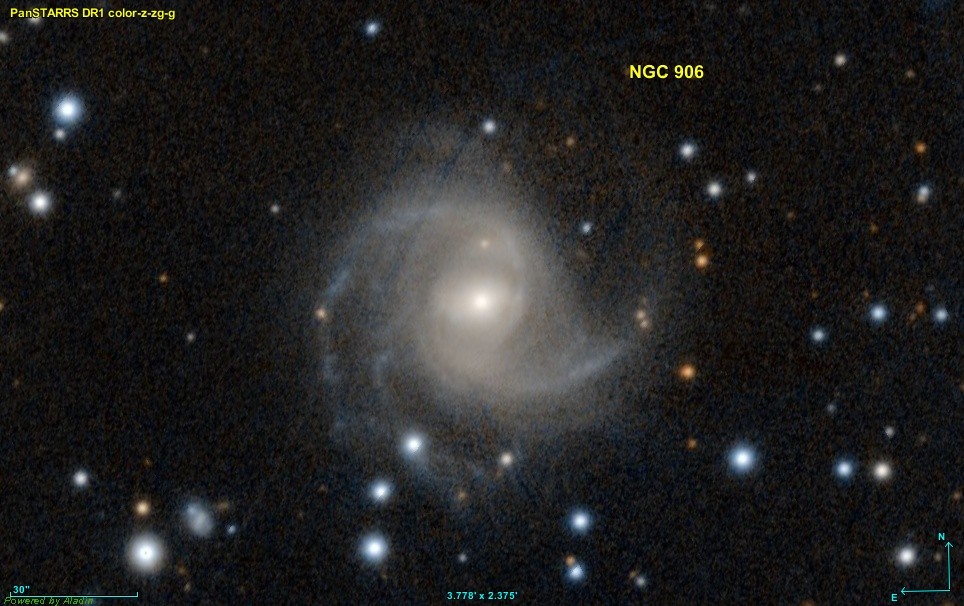
- Pan-STARRS image of NGC 906

Observation data (J2000 epoch)
- Constellation: Andromeda
- Right ascension: 02^{h} 25^{m} 16.255^{s}
- Declination: +42° 05′ 23.48″
- Redshift: 0.01561
- Heliocentric radial velocity: 4643 km/s
- Distance: 207.5 Mly (63.62 Mpc)
- Apparent magnitude (V): 12.71
- Apparent magnitude (B): 13.76
- Absolute magnitude (V): −21.0

Characteristics
- Type: SBab

Other designations
- UGC 1868, MCG +07-06-012, PGC 9188

NGC 906 is a barred spiral galaxy in the constellation Andromeda in the northern sky. It is estimated to be 215 million light years from the Milky Way and has a diameter of approximately 110,000 ly. NGC 906 was discovered on October 30, 1878 by astronomer Édouard Stephan.

== See also ==
- List of NGC objects (1–1000)
