= NGC 7680 =

Galaxy

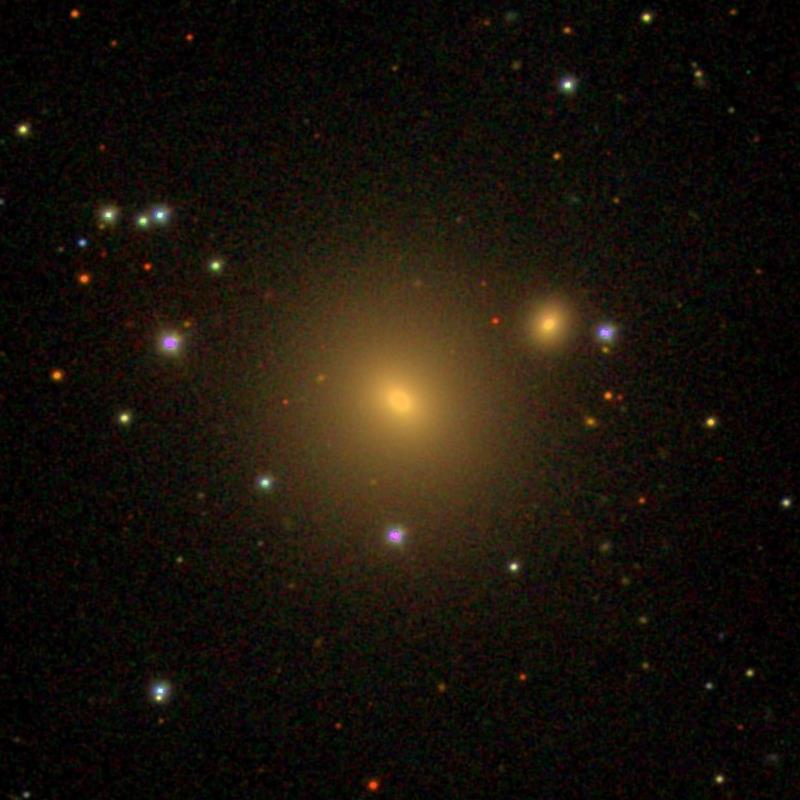
- SDSS color image of NGC 7680 and LEDA 3088959

Observation data
- Constellation: Pegasus
- Right ascension: 23^{h} 28^{m} 35.2^{s}
- Declination: +32° 24′ 56.8″
- Redshift: 0.01713
- Heliocentric radial velocity: 5,090±41 km/s

NGC 7680 is a 13th magnitude lenticular galaxy or elliptical galaxy in the constellation Pegasus. It was first discovered by William Herschel in 1790 and subsequently studied by astronomers such as John Herschel and Edouard Stephan in the 19th century. Directly northeast lies a compact galaxy, LEDA 3088959, which has been identified as a local active galactic nucleus candidate in SIMBAD.

== LGG 475 ==
It is part of a galaxy group known as LGG 475. It is made out of 5 members, which are NGC 7680, MCG 5-55-21, UGC 12666, UGC 12645 and UGC 12650.
