= NGC 1019 =

Galaxy in the constellation Cetus

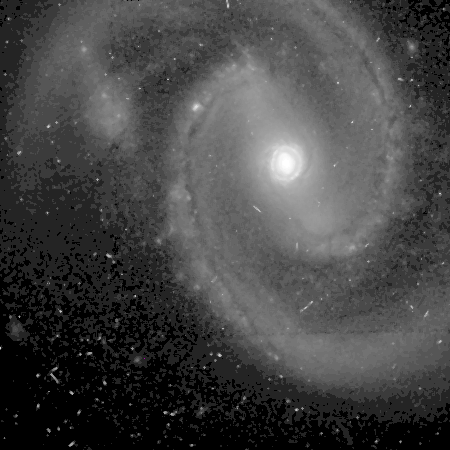
- NGC 1019 (NASA/ESA HST)

Observation data (J2000.0 epoch)
- Constellation: Cetus
- Right ascension: 02^{h} 38^{m} 27.41^{s}
- Declination: +01° 54′ 27.79″
- Redshift: 0.024340
- Heliocentric radial velocity: 7297 ± 20 km/s
- Distance: 316 Mly
- Apparent magnitude (V): 13.60
- Apparent magnitude (B): 14.40

Characteristics
- Type: SB(rs)bc
- Apparent size (V): 1.0 × 0.9

Other designations
- UGC 2132, MCG +0-7-68, PGC 10006

NGC 1019 is a barred spiral galaxy approximately 316 million light-years away from Earth in the constellation of Cetus. It was discovered by French astronomer Édouard Stephan on December 1, 1880 with the 31" reflecting telescope at the Marseille Observatory.

NGC 1019 is classified as Type I Seyfert galaxy. Its nuclei is surrounded by tight rings or annuli of star formation, and the rings contain compact, young star clusters.

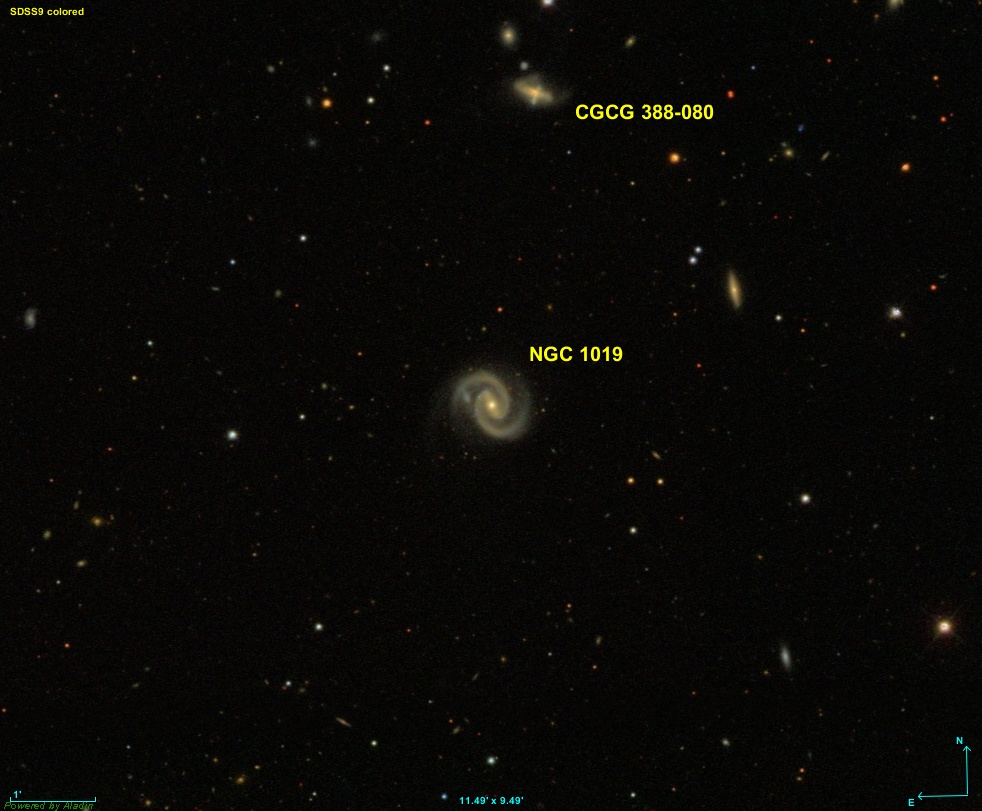
NGC 1019 (SDSS)

== See also ==
- List of NGC objects (1001–2000)
