= NGC 304 =

Galaxy in constellation Andromeda

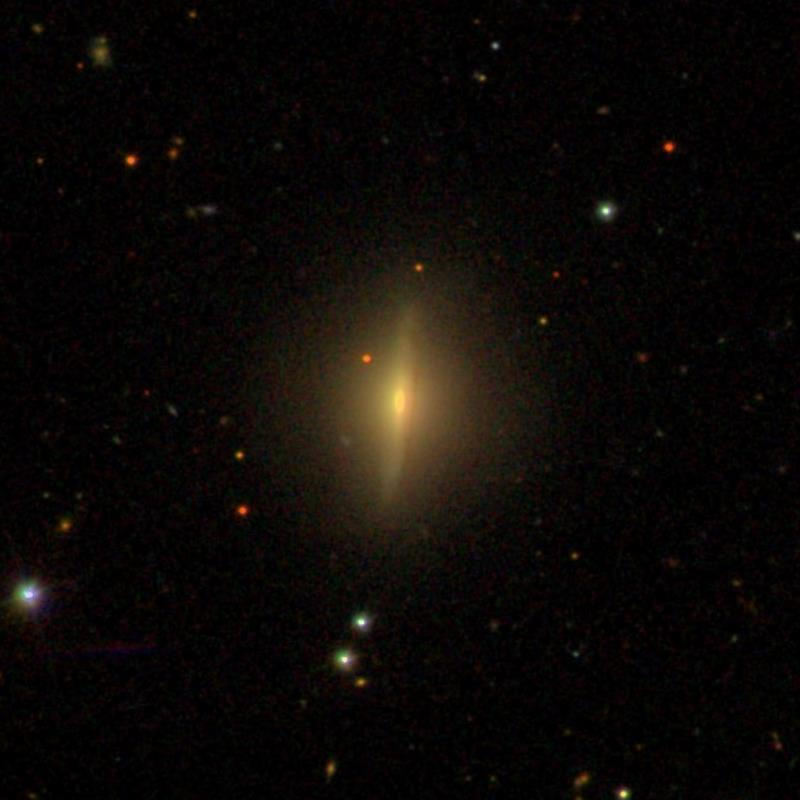
- SDSS image of NGC 304

Observation data (J2000 epoch)
- Constellation: Andromeda
- Right ascension: 00^{h} 56^{m} 06.0^{s}
- Declination: +24° 07′ 37″
- Redshift: 0.016648
- Heliocentric radial velocity: 4,991 km/s
- Apparent magnitude (V): 14.01

Characteristics
- Type: S0
- Apparent size (V): 1.1' × 0.7'

Other designations
- 2MASXi J0056060+240735, 2MASX J00560603+2407367, UGC 573, MCG +04-03-018, PGC 3326, CGCG 480-023

NGC 304 is a lenticular galaxy in the constellation Andromeda. It was discovered on October 23, 1878, by Édouard Stephan.

== Supernova ==
One supernova has been observed in NGC 304:

- SN 2021dnn (Type Ia, mag. 15.838), was discovered by ATLAS on 22 February 2021.
