= NGC 2119 =

Elliptical galaxy in the constellation Orion

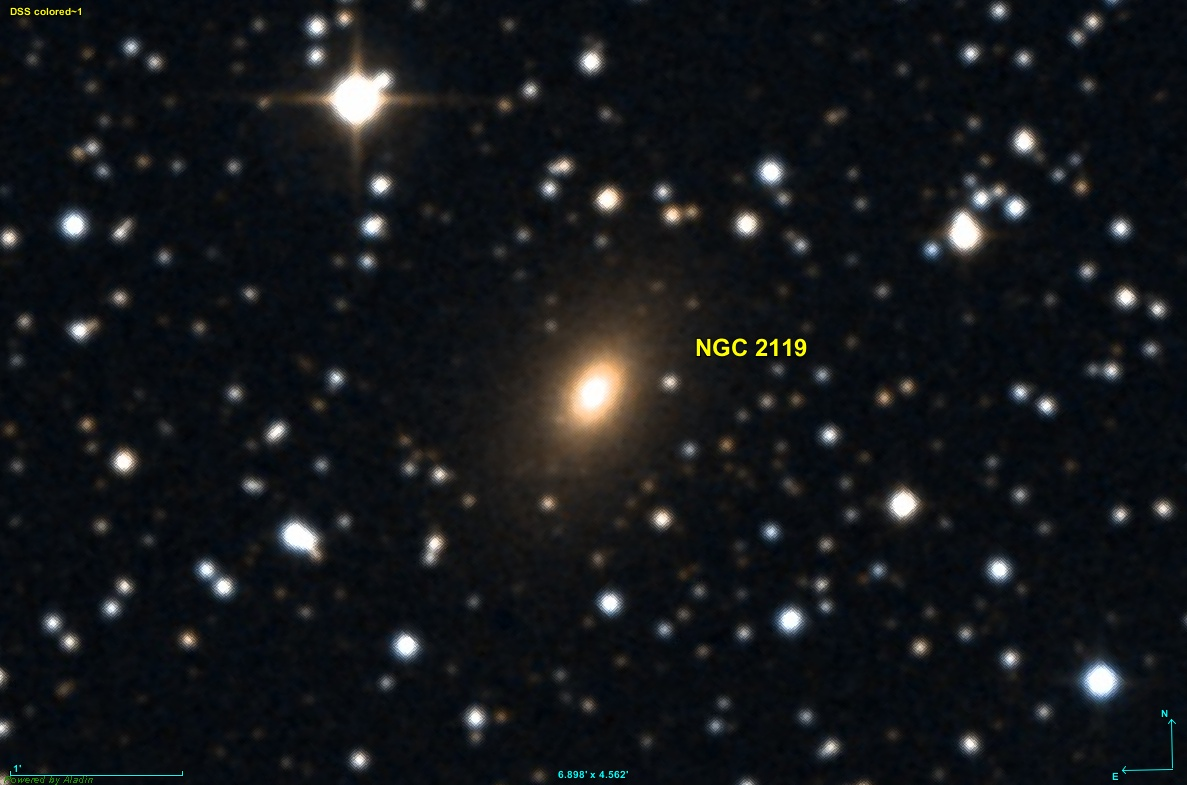
- NGC 2119 imaged by DSS

Observation data (J2000 epoch)
- Constellation: Orion
- Right ascension: 05^{h} 57^{m} 26.9^{s}
- Declination: ±11° 56′ 56″
- Redshift: 0.011548
- Heliocentric radial velocity: 3,585 km/s
- Distance: 169.5 ± 11.9 Mly (51.97 ± 3.65 Mpc)
- Apparent magnitude (V): 13.6

Characteristics
- Type: E2
- Size: ~177,000 ly (54.28 kpc) (estimated)
- Apparent size (V): 1.2' × 1.0'

Other designations
- UGC 3380, PGC 18136

NGC 2119 (also identified as UGC 3380 or PGC 18136) is an elliptical galaxy in the constellation Orion. It was discovered by Édouard Stephan on January 9, 1880.

== See also ==
- List of NGC objects (2001–3000)
