= NGC 810 =

Elliptical galaxy in the constellation Cetus

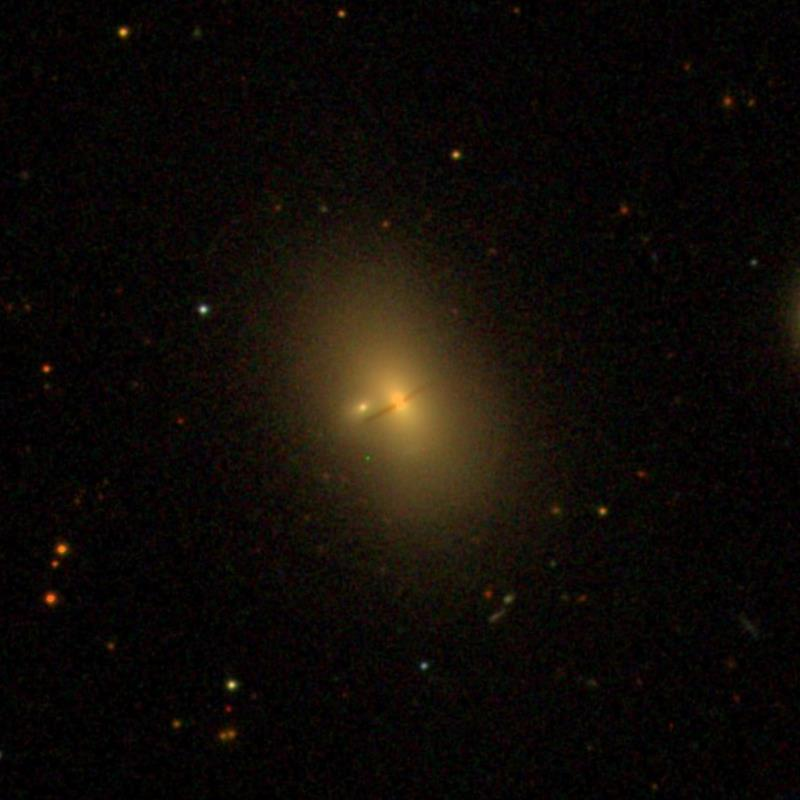
- SDSS image of NGC 810

Observation data (J2000 epoch)
- Constellation: Cetus
- Right ascension: 02^{h} 05^{m} 28.563^{s}
- Declination: +13° 15′ 05.88″
- Redshift: 0.02592
- Heliocentric radial velocity: 7670 km/s
- Distance: 355.7 ± 25.0 Mly (109.06 ± 7.66 Mpc)
- Apparent magnitude (B): 15.4

Characteristics
- Type: E5

Other designations
- UGC 1583, MCG +02-06-026, PGC 7965

NGC 810 is an unbarred elliptical galaxy located in the constellation Cetus, approximately 360 million light-years from the Milky Way. It was discovered by the French astronomer Édouard Stephan in 1871.

NGC 810 is currently in a merger event. It is interacting with the galaxy SDSS J020529.28+131503.5.

== See also ==
- List of NGC objects (1–1000)
