= NGC 606 =

Galaxy in the constellation Pisces

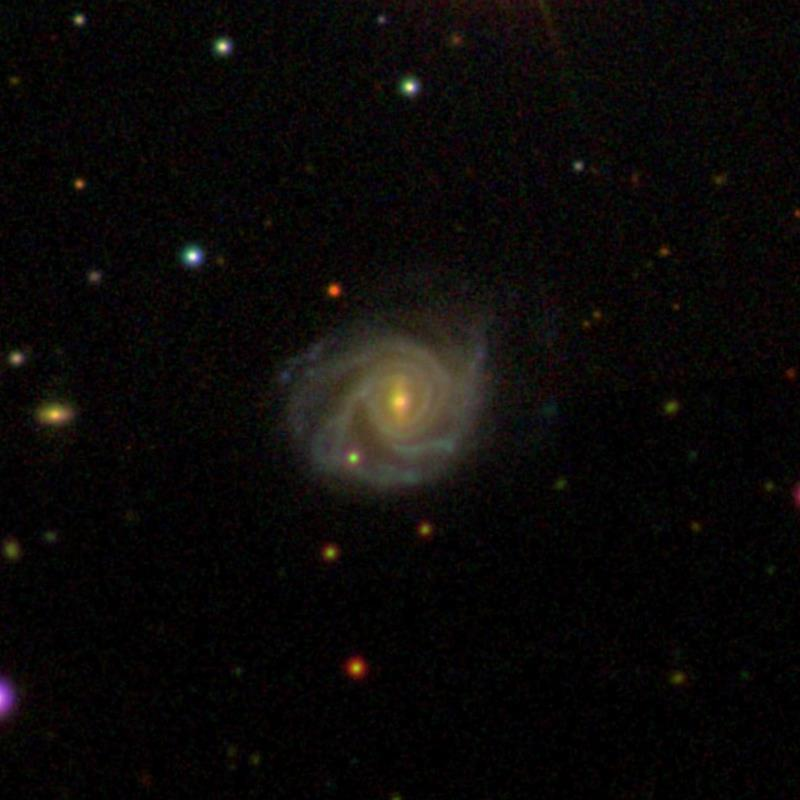
- SDSS image of NGC 606

Observation data (J2000 epoch)
- Constellation: Pisces
- Right ascension: 01^{h} 34^{m} 50.14672^{s}
- Declination: +21° 25′ 06.3712″
- Redshift: 0.033253
- Heliocentric radial velocity: 9803 km/s
- Distance: 465.5 ± 32.6 Mly (142.72 ± 10.00 Mpc)
- Apparent magnitude (B): 14.5

Characteristics
- Type: SB(r)c

Other designations
- UGC 1126, MCG +03-05-010, PGC 5874

NGC 606 is a barred spiral galaxy located in the constellation Pisces about 470 million light-years from the Milky Way. It was discovered by the French astronomer Édouard Stephan in 1881.

One supernova has been observed in NGC 606: SN 2016fmt (Type II, mag. 17.8) was discovered by the Italian Supernovae Search Project (ISSP) on 28 August 2016.

== See also ==
- List of NGC objects (1–1000)
