= NGC 22 =

Spiral galaxy in the constellation Pegasus

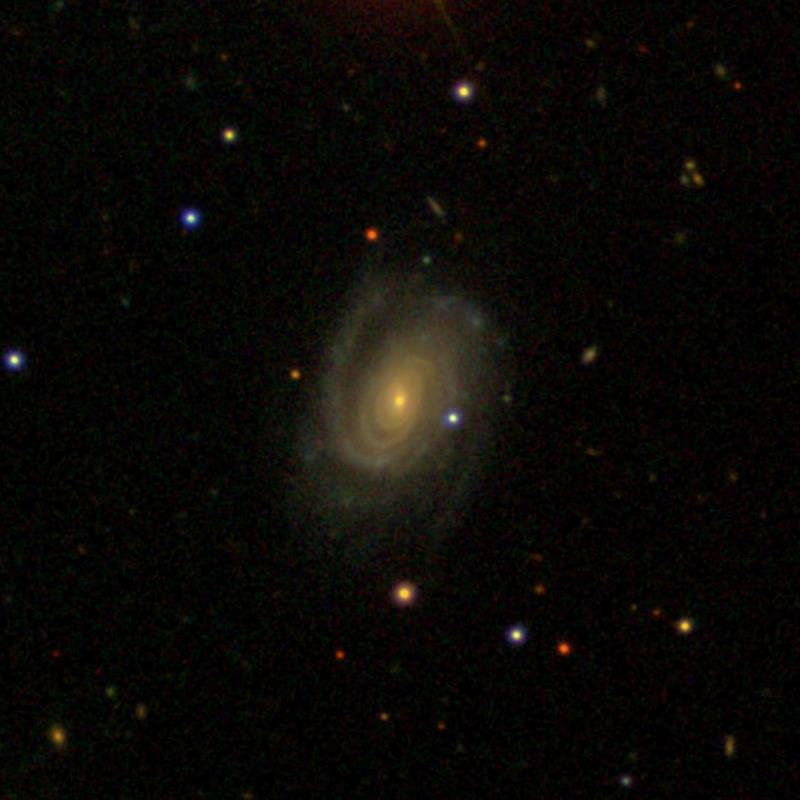

Observation data (J 2000.0 epoch)
- Constellation: Pegasus
- Right ascension: 00^{h} 09^{m} 48.2^{s}
- Declination: +27° 49′ 56″
- Redshift: 0.027726
- Heliocentric radial velocity: 8,312 ± 1 km/s
- Distance: 354 ± 25 Mly; 108.5 ± 7.8 Mpc
- Apparent magnitude (V): +14.4
- Absolute magnitude (V): −20.53

Characteristics
- Type: Sb
- Apparent size (V): 1.25′ × 0.85′

Other designations
- IRAS F00072+2733, NGC 22, UGC 86, LEDA 690, MCG +05-01-039, PGC 690

NGC 22 is a spiral galaxy located in the constellation Pegasus. It was discovered in 1883 by French astronomer Édouard Stephan and was catalogued as the 22nd object in the New General Catalogue, compiled by J. L. E. Dreyer in 1888. The galaxy has an apparent visual magnitude of +14.4 and spans an angular size of 1.25′ × 0.85′.

The morphological classification of this galaxy is Sb, indicating a spiral form with somewhat tightly wound arms. It is located at a distance of 354 ± 25 million light-years (108.5 ± 7.8 Mpc) from the Milky Way.

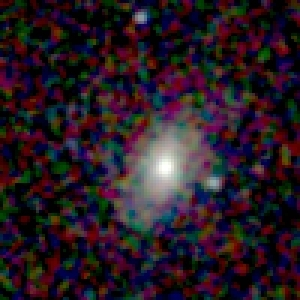
NGC 22 (near-infrared)
