= NGC 620 =

Galaxy in the constellation of Andromeda

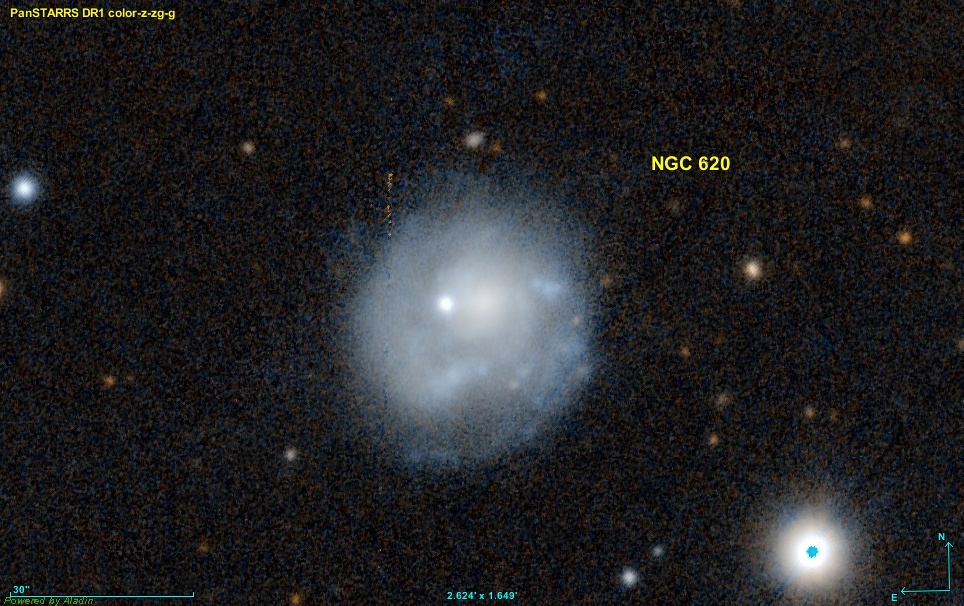
- Pan-STARRS image of NGC 620

Observation data (J2000 epoch)
- Constellation: Andromeda
- Right ascension: 01^{h} 36^{m} 59.68625^{s}
- Declination: +42° 19′ 23.6764″
- Redshift: 0.008279
- Heliocentric radial velocity: 2472 km/s
- Distance: 123 Mly (37.8 Mpc)
- Apparent magnitude (B): 13.52

Characteristics
- Type: Scd

Other designations
- UGC 1150, MCG +07-04-006, PGC 5990

NGC 620 is a spiral galaxy located in the constellation Andromeda about 123 million light-years from the Milky Way. It was discovered by the French astronomer Édouard Stephan in 1871.

== See also ==
- List of NGC objects (1–1000)
