= NGC 911 =

Galaxy in the constellation Andromeda

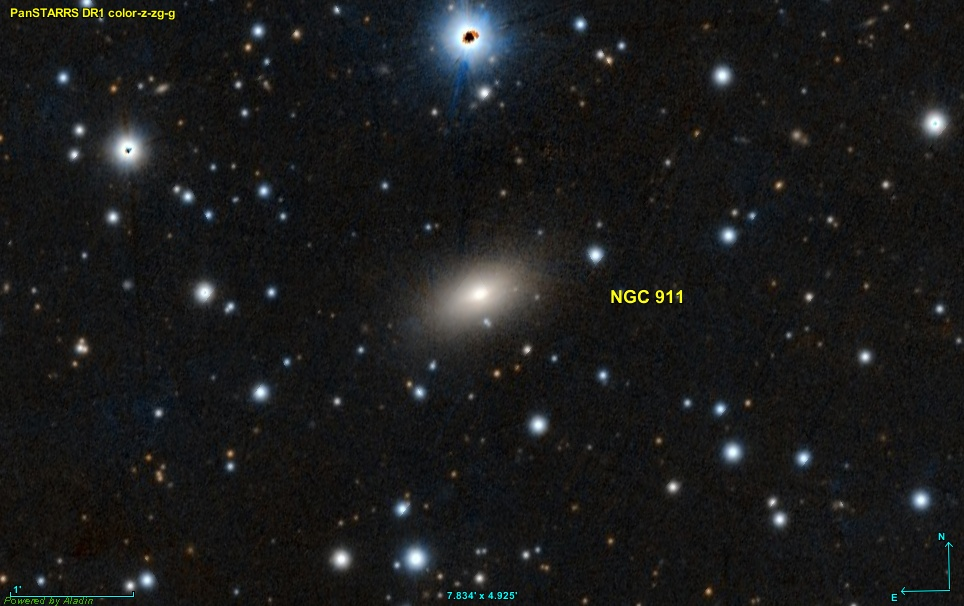
- Pan-STARRS image of NGC 911

Observation data (J2000 epoch)
- Constellation: Andromeda
- Right ascension: 02^{h} 25^{m} 42.397^{s}
- Declination: +41° 57′ 22.59″
- Redshift: 0.01885
- Heliocentric radial velocity: 5598 km/s
- Distance: 257.9 Mly (79.07 Mpc)
- Group or cluster: Abell 347
- Apparent magnitude (B): 14.0

Characteristics
- Type: E

Other designations
- UGC 1878, MCG +07-06-016, PGC 9221

NGC 911 is an elliptical galaxy located in the constellation Andromeda about 258 million light years from the Milky Way. It was discovered by French astronomer Édouard Stephan on 30 October 1878. It is a member of the galaxy cluster Abell 347.

== See also ==
- List of NGC objects (1–1000)
