= NGC 218 =

Galaxy in the constellation Andromeda

UGC 480
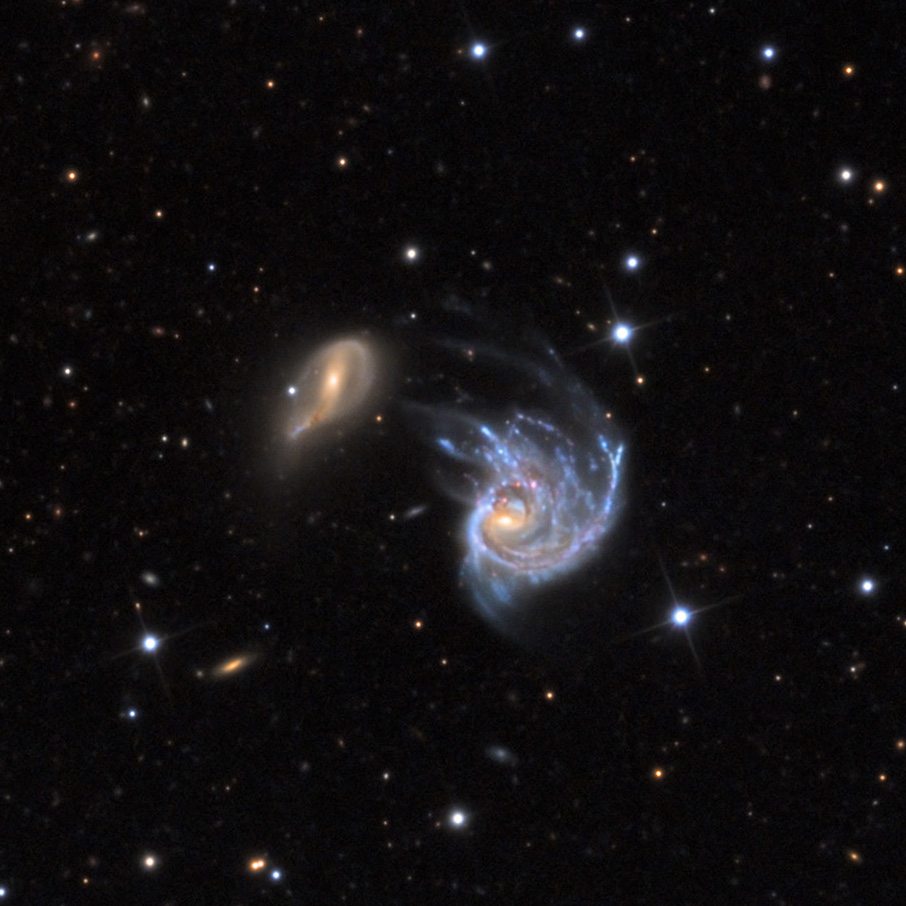
- UGC 480 (right) interacting with PGC 2726; Credit: Adam Block/Mount Lemmon SkyCenter/University of Arizona

Observation data (J2000 epoch)
- Constellation: Andromeda
- Right ascension: 00^{h} 46^{m} 32.0^{s}
- Declination: +36° 19′ 32″
- Redshift: 0.037426
- Distance: ~500 Mly
- Apparent magnitude (V): 13.50
- Apparent magnitude (B): 13.6

Characteristics
- Type: S
- Apparent size (V): 1.5' × 1.2'

Other designations
- UGC 480, UGC 480 W, CGCG 519-021, MCG +06-02-016, VV 527A, KPG 16A, 2MASX J00463200+3619318, 2MASXi J0046319+361932, IRAS 00438+3603, F00437+3603, PGC 2720.

NGC 218, also known as UGC 480, is a spiral galaxy located approximately 500 million light-years from the Sun in the constellation Andromeda. It was discovered on October 17, 1876, by Édouard Stephan, and is interacting with the galaxy PGC 2726.

== See also ==
- Spiral galaxy
- List of NGC objects (1–1000)
- Andromeda (constellation)
