= NGC 228 =

Galaxy in the constellation Andromeda

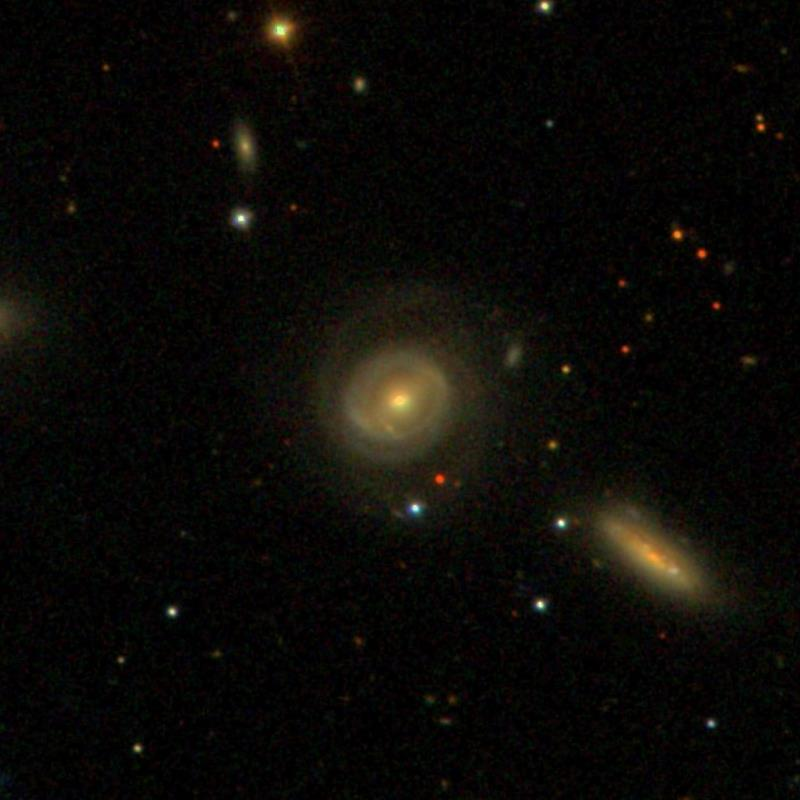
- SDSS image of NGC 228 (center)

Observation data (J2000 epoch)
- Constellation: Andromeda
- Right ascension: 00^{h} 42^{m} 54.5^{s}
- Declination: +23° 30′ 11″
- Redshift: 0.024737
- Apparent magnitude (V): 14.57

Characteristics
- Type: SBa
- Apparent size (V): 1.2' × 1.1'

Other designations
- UGC 458, CGCG 479-062, MCG +04-02-048, 2MASX J00425452+2330108, 2MASXi J0042545+233011, PGC 2563.

NGC 228 is a spiral galaxy located in the constellation Andromeda. It was discovered on October 10, 1879 by Édouard Stephan.
