= NGC 912 =

Lenticular galaxy in the constellation Andromeda

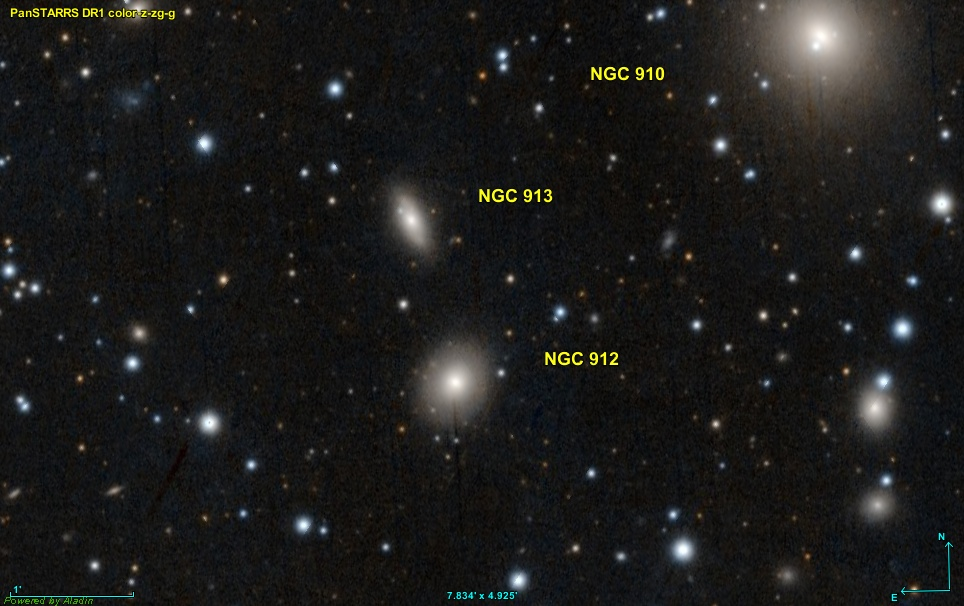
- Pan-STARRS image of NGC 912

Observation data (J2000 epoch)
- Constellation: Andromeda
- Right ascension: 02^{h} 25^{m} 42.74134^{s}
- Declination: +41° 46′ 38.5794″
- Redshift: 0.01470
- Heliocentric radial velocity: 4375 km/s
- Distance: 239.6 Mly (73.45 Mpc)
- Group or cluster: Abell 347
- Apparent magnitude (B): 15.0

Characteristics
- Type: S0-a

Other designations
- MCG +07-06-015, PGC 9222

NGC 912 is a compact lenticular galaxy located in the constellation Andromeda about 197 million light years from the Milky Way. It was discovered by French astronomer Édouard Stephan in 1878.

== See also ==
- List of NGC objects (1–1000)
