= NGC 913 =

Lenticular galaxy in the constellation Andromeda

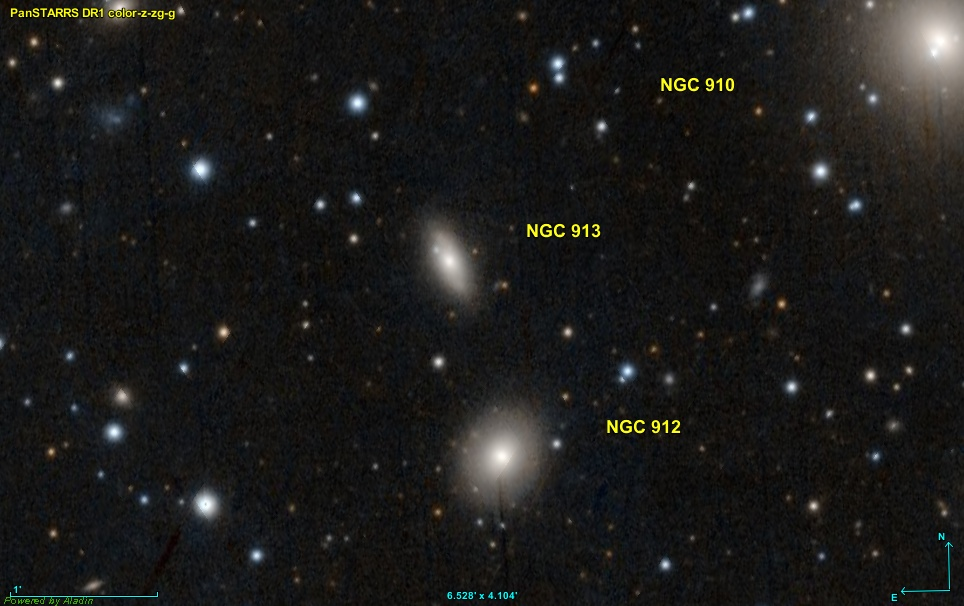
- Pan-STARRS image of NGC 913

Observation data (J2000 epoch)
- Constellation: Andromeda
- Right ascension: 02^{h} 25^{m} 44.63255^{s}
- Declination: +41° 47′ 57.7826″
- Redshift: 0.016871
- Heliocentric radial velocity: 5015 km/s
- Distance: 231.0 ± 16.2 Mly (70.84 ± 4.98 Mpc)
- Apparent magnitude (V): 15.0

Other designations
- 2MASX J02254463+4147580, PGC 9230

NGC 913 is a lenticular galaxy located in the constellation Andromeda about 224 million light years from the Milky Way. It was discovered by French astronomer Édouard Stephan in 1878.

== See also ==
- List of NGC objects (1–1000)
