= NGC 282 =

Elliptical galaxy in the constellation Pisces

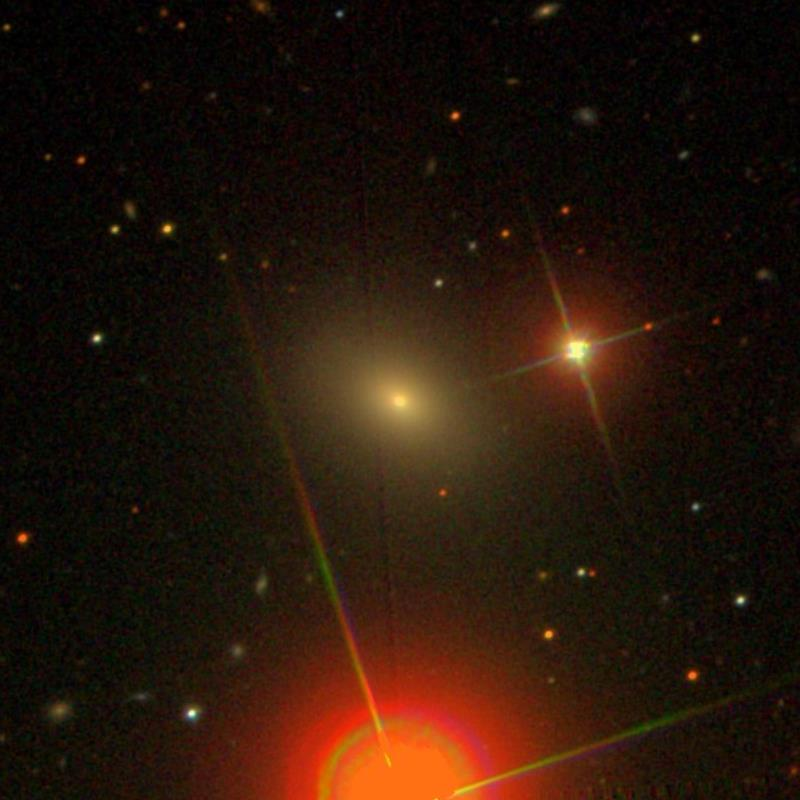
- SDSS image of NGC 282

Observation data (J2000 epoch)
- Constellation: Pisces
- Right ascension: 00^{h} 52^{m} 42.1^{s}
- Declination: +30° 38′ 21″
- Redshift: 0.022259
- Heliocentric radial velocity: 6,673 km/s
- Apparent magnitude (V): 14.7

Characteristics
- Type: E
- Apparent size (V): 0.4' × 0.3'

Other designations
- CGCG 501-030, MCG +05-03-015, 2MASX J00524213+3038208, 2MASXi J0052421+303820, PGC 3090.

NGC 282 is an elliptical galaxy in the constellation Pisces. It was discovered on October 13, 1879 by Édouard Stephan.

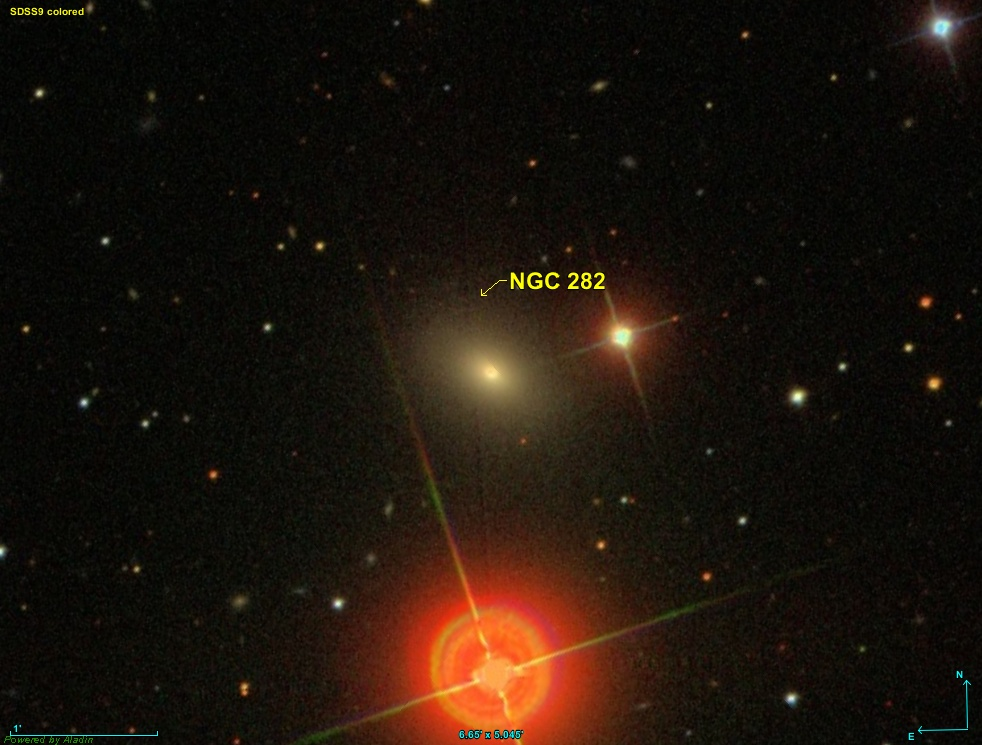
NGC 282 (SDSS)
