= NGC 1198 =

Galaxy in the constellation Perseus

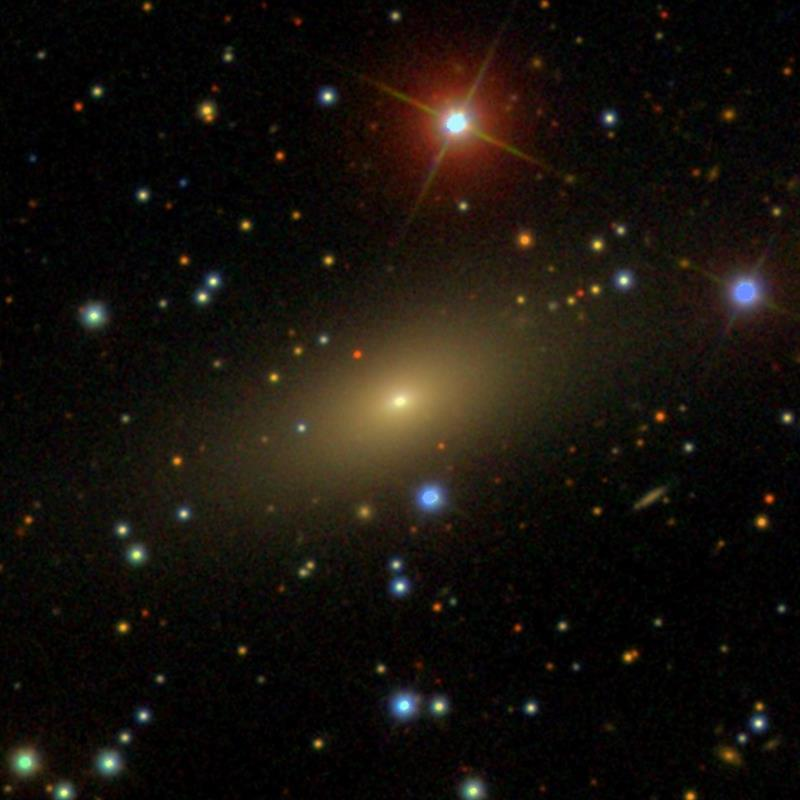
- NGC 1198 imaged by SDSS

Observation data (J2000 epoch)
- Constellation: Perseus
- Right ascension: 03^{h} 06^{m} 13.2578^{s}
- Declination: +41° 50′ 55.883″
- Redshift: 0.005310
- Heliocentric radial velocity: 1592 ± 6 km/s
- Distance: 68.2 ± 4.8 Mly (20.92 ± 1.48 Mpc)
- Apparent magnitude (V): 12.5

Characteristics
- Type: E-SO
- Size: ~58,000 ly (17.78 kpc) (estimated)
- Apparent size (V): 1.4′ × 0.8′

Other designations
- 2MASX J03061323+4150563, IC 282, UGC 2533, MCG +07-07-024, PGC 11648, CGCG 540-038

NGC 1198 is an elliptical galaxy in the constellation of Perseus. Its velocity with respect to the cosmic microwave background is 1419 ± 14 km/s, which corresponds to a Hubble distance of 20.92 ± 1.48 Mpc (~68 million light-years). It was discovered by French astronomer Édouard Stephan on 6 December 1880. This galaxy was also observed by the American astronomer Lewis Swift on 27 October 1888, and was later added to the Index Catalogue as IC 282.

== Supernova ==
One supernova has been observed in NGC 1198: SN 2024epr (Type Ia, mag 19.3721) was discovered by the Zwicky Transient Facility on 19 March 2024.

== See also ==
- List of NGC objects (1001–2000)
