= NGC 99 =

Spiral Galaxy in the constellation Pisces

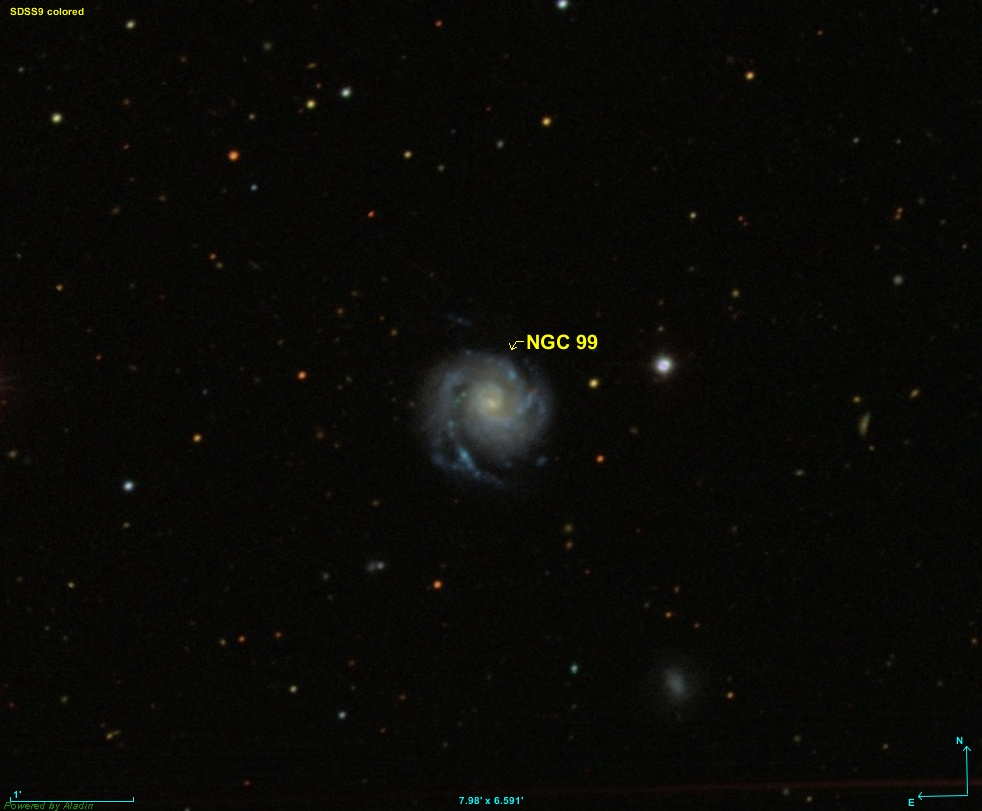
- SDSS image of NGC 99

Observation data (J2000 epoch)
- Constellation: Pisces
- Right ascension: 00^{h} 23^{m} 59.422^{s}
- Declination: +15° 46′ 13.04″
- Redshift: 0.017712
- Heliocentric radial velocity: 5310
- Distance: 29.1 Mpc (95 Mly)
- Apparent magnitude (V): 13.65
- Apparent magnitude (B): 13.99

Characteristics
- Type: Scd
- Size: 41,000 ly (12,700 pc)
- Apparent size (V): 1.5′ × 1.5′

Other designations
- UGC 230, MCG+02-02-006, PGC 1523

NGC 99 is a spiral galaxy in the constellation Pisces. It was discovered on 8 October 1883 by the French astronomer Édouard Stephan.
