= 91 Aegina =

Main-belt asteroid

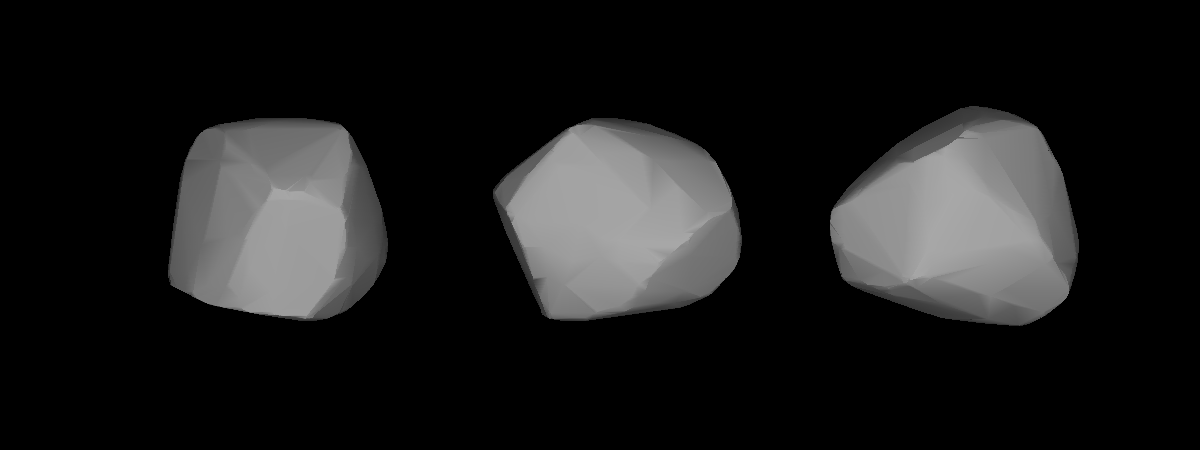
- Lightcurve-based 3D model of 91 Aegina

Discovery
- Discovered by: Édouard Stephan
- Discovery date: 4 November 1866

Designations
- Pronunciation: /ɪˈdʒaɪnə/
- Named after: Aegina
- Minor planet category: Main belt
- Adjectives: Aeginetan /iːdʒɪˈniːtən/

Orbital characteristics
- Epoch 9 June 2026 (JD 2461200.5)
- Uncertainty parameter 0
- Aphelion: 2.8694 AU
- Perihelion: 2.3094
- Semi-major axis: 2.5894 AU
- Eccentricity: 0.10813
- Orbital period (sidereal): 1,521.97 d (4.167 yr)
- Average orbital speed: 18.45 km/s
- Mean anomaly: 61.905°
- Inclination: 2.1029°
- Longitude of ascending node: 10.359°
- Argument of perihelion: 74.086°
- T_{Jupiter}: 3.411

Physical characteristics
- Mean diameter: 103.67±4.86 km (composite estimate)
- Mass: (1.09±0.15)×10^{18} kg (Note: Calculated from its standard gravitational parameter GM = 0.073±0.010 km^{3}/s^{2}.)
- Mean density: 1.90 g/cm^{3} (Note: Assuming a diameter of 103 km.)
- Equatorial surface gravity: 0.0307 m/s^{2}
- Equatorial escape velocity: 0.0580 km/s
- Synodic rotation period: 6.03 hours
- Geometric albedo: 0.043
- Spectral type: C
- Absolute magnitude (H): 8.84

91 Aegina (from Latin Aegīna, Aegīnēta) is a large main-belt asteroid. It was discovered by French astronomer Édouard Jean-Marie Stephan on 4 November 1866. It was his second and final asteroid discovery. The first was 89 Julia. The asteroid's name comes from Aegina, a Greek mythological figure associated with the island of the same name.

This body is orbiting the Sun with a period of 4.17 years and an eccentricity of 0.105. The orbit of this object brings it to within 4.9 Gm of the dwarf planet Ceres, and the resulting gravitational interaction has been used to produce mass estimates of the latter. The cross-section size of the asteroid is 110 km and it has a rotation period of six hours. The surface coloring of 91 Aegina is very dark and this C-type asteroid has probably a primitive carbonaceous composition. Observation of absorption bands at wavelengths of 0.7 and 3 μm indicate the presence of hydrated minerals and/or ice grains on the surface.
