= Torra di Nonza =

Genoese coastal defence tower in Corsica

Tower of Nonza
- Torra di Nonza (Corsican)
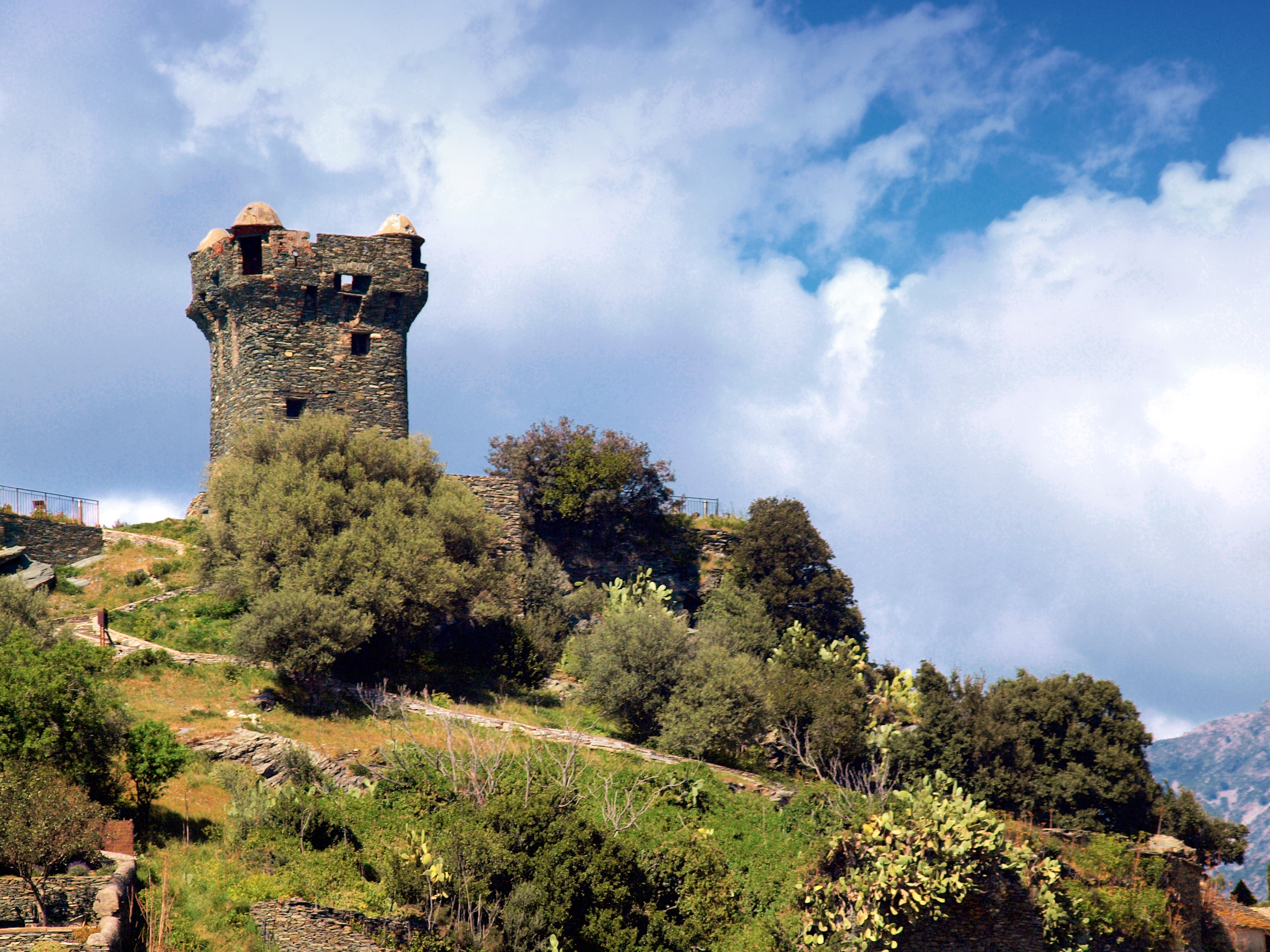

- Location within Corsica
- 42°47′06″N 9°20′37″E

History
- Built: before 1617

Monument historique
- Designated: 5 July 1926
- Reference no.: PA00099219

The Tower of Nonza (Corsican: Torra di Nonza) is a Genoese tower located in the commune of Nonza (Haute-Corse) on the coast of Corsica. The tower sits at an elevation of 155 metres (509 ft) in the village of Nonza on the west coast of Capicorsu.

The tower was one of a series of coastal defences built by the Republic of Genoa between 1530 and 1620 to stem the attacks by Barbary pirates. The exact date of construction is not known but the tower is included in a list compiled by the Genoese authorities in 1617 where it is recorded as being guarded only at night.

The tower of Nonza is famous for its siege in 1768, during the war between Pasquale Paoli's independent Corsica and France. The troops protecting the village of Nonza had been taken prisoner by the French forces north of the village, but the commander of the troops remained in the tower. It is said that he managed to make the French troops believe in a fierce resistance during the siege so that they would agree to his conditions for surrender, which were to let him join the rest of Paoli's troops and grant him the military honours. When he came out of the tower alone, the French commander, stunned, asked where the troops were. He is said to have answered: "here is the commander and the troop".

In 1926 the tower was listed as one of the official historical monuments of France.

== See also ==
- List of Genoese towers in Corsica
