= Nonza =

- Commune
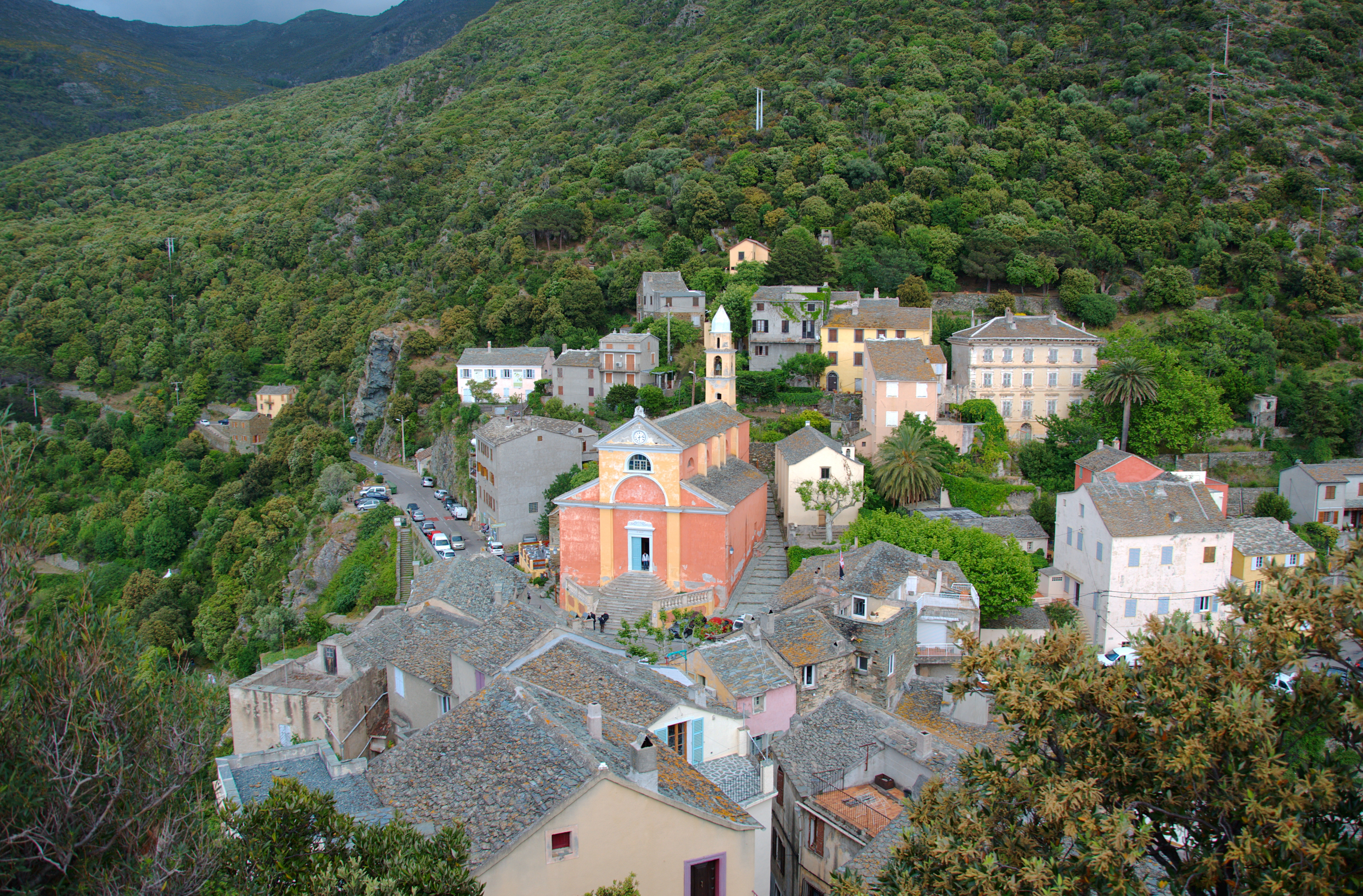
- The church and surrounding buildings in Nonza

- Coat of arms
- Location of Nonza
- Location within France Location within Corsica
- Coordinates: 42°47′07″N 9°20′42″E
- Country: France
- Region: Corsica
- Department: Haute-Corse
- Arrondissement: Bastia
- Canton: Cap Corse
- Intercommunality: Cap Corse

Government
  - Mayor (2020–2026): Jean-Marie Dominici
- Area^{1}: 8.04 km^{2} (3.10 sq mi)
- Elevation: 120 m (390 ft)
- Highest elevation: 841 m (2,759 ft)
- Lowest elevation: 0 m (0 ft)
- Population (2023): 62
  - Density: 7.7/km^{2} (20/sq mi)
- Time zone: UTC+01:00 (CET)
  - Summer (DST): UTC+02:00 (CEST)
- INSEE/Postal code: 2B178 /20217
- ^{1} French Land Register data, which excludes lakes, ponds, glaciers > 1 km^{2} (0.386 sq mi or 247 acres) and river estuaries.

Nonza (French pronunciation: [nɔ̃ts(a)]) is a commune in the Haute-Corse department of France on the island of Corsica.

== Population ==
Historical population
Year	Pop.	±% p.a.
1968	137	—
1975	71	−8.96%
1982	68	−0.61%
1990	86	+2.98%
1999	67	−2.74%
2007	67	+0.00%
2012	72	+1.45%
2017	74	+0.55%
2023	62	−2.91%
Source: INSEE

== See also ==
- Communes of the Haute-Corse department
- Torra di Nonza
