= Édouard Stephan =

French astronomer

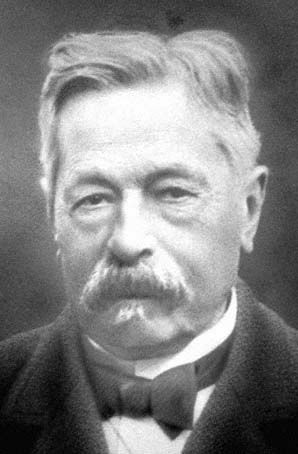
- Born: 31 August 1837
- Died: 31 December 1923 (aged 86)
- Citizenship: France
- Scientific career
- Fields: Astronomy
- Thesis: Sur une classe d'équations aux dérivées partielles du second ordre (1865)

Édouard Jean-Marie Stephan (31 August 1837 – 31 December 1923) was a French astronomer. His surname is sometimes spelled Stéphan in some literature, but this is apparently erroneous.

He was born in Sainte Pezenne (today one of the districts of the town of Niort) and attended the Ecole Normale Superieure, and graduated at the top of his class in 1862.

He was the director of the Marseille Observatory from 1864 to 1907 (until 1872 he was subordinate to Urbain le Verrier). In the early part of his career there, he had limited opportunities to do observations because he was preoccupied with improving the observatory. He discovered the asteroid 89 Julia in 1866. In 1867 he used the new telescope to observe a transit of Mercury.

Between 1870 and 1875, Stephan systematically studied nebulae, precisely recording their positions and discovering many new ones. His goal was to enable the exact measurement of stellar proper motions by creating a reference system of fixed objects.

In 1873, Stephan was the first person to attempt to measure the angular diameter of a star using interferometry, converting the 80 cm telescope at Marseille Observatory into an interferometer. He did this by obscuring the reflector with a mask containing two vertical slits. The star he chose to perform this experiment was Sirius. He did not succeed in resolving any stellar disks, but by 1874 had obtained an upper limit to stellar diameters of 0.158" (the true angular diameter of Sirius is 0.0059 arcseconds, and for comparison, the angular diameter of Alpha Centauri and Betelgeuse are 0.0145 and 0.05 arcseconds respectively).

In 1881 he discovered NGC 5, and he discovered the galaxy NGC 6027 the following year using the 80 cm reflector.

Among others, he discovered Stephan's Quintet, also known as "Arp 319", a group of five galaxies. Stephan made this discovery with the first telescope equipped with a reflection coated mirror.

In 1884 the French Academy of Sciences awarded him the Valz Prize (Prix Valz). His name is associated with the periodic comet 38P/Stephan-Oterma, although Jérôme Coggia saw it first.

He became a Chevalier of the Légion d'honneur in 1868 and an Officier of the Légion d'honneur in 1879.

Asteroids discovered: 2
89 Julia	6 August 1866
91 Aegina	4 November 1866

== Obituary ==
- JO 7 (1924) 9 (in French)
