= 1740 =

1740 in various calendars
- Gregorian calendar: 1740; MDCCXL
- Ab urbe condita: 2493
- Armenian calendar: 1189; ԹՎ ՌՃՁԹ
- Assyrian calendar: 6490
- Balinese saka calendar: 1661–1662
- Bengali calendar: 1146–1147
- Berber calendar: 2690
- British Regnal year: 13 Geo. 2 – 14 Geo. 2
- Buddhist calendar: 2284
- Burmese calendar: 1102
- Byzantine calendar: 7248–7249
- Chinese calendar: 己未年 (Earth Goat); 4437 or 4230 — to — 庚申年 (Metal Monkey); 4438 or 4231
- Coptic calendar: 1456–1457
- Discordian calendar: 2906
- Ethiopian calendar: 1732–1733
- Hebrew calendar: 5500–5501
- Hindu calendars
- Vikram Samvat: 1796–1797
- Shaka Samvat: 1661–1662
- Kali Yuga: 4840–4841
- Holocene calendar: 11740
- Igbo calendar: 740–741
- Iranian calendar: 1118–1119
- Islamic calendar: 1152–1153
- Japanese calendar: Genbun 5 (元文５年)
- Javanese calendar: 1664–1665
- Julian calendar: Gregorian minus 11 days
- Korean calendar: 4073
- Minguo calendar: 172 before ROC 民前172年
- Nanakshahi calendar: 272
- Thai solar calendar: 2282–2283
- Tibetan calendar: ས་མོ་ལུག་ལོ་ (female Earth-Sheep); 1866 or 1485 or 713 — to — ལྕགས་ཕོ་སྤྲེ་ལོ་ (male Iron-Monkey); 1867 or 1486 or 714

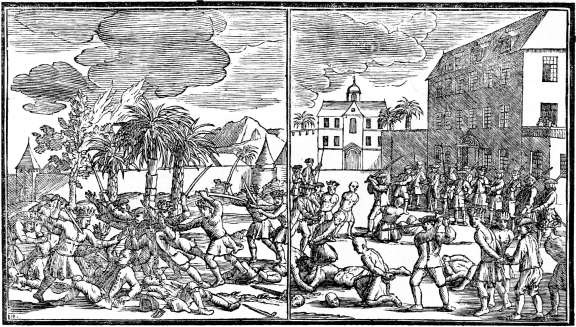
October 9: The Batavia Massacre by the Dutch East India Company of at least 10,000 Chinese Indonesians begins in what is now Jakarta.

1740 (MDCCXL) was a leap year starting on Friday of the Gregorian calendar and a leap year starting on Tuesday of the Julian calendar, the 1740th year of the Common Era (CE) and Anno Domini (AD) designations, the 740th year of the 2nd millennium, the 40th year of the 18th century, and the 1st year of the 1740s decade. As of the start of 1740, the Gregorian calendar was 11 days ahead of the Julian calendar, which remained in localized use until 1923.

== Events ==
=== January–March ===
- January 8 – All 237 crewmen on the Dutch East India Company ship Rooswijk are drowned when the vessel strikes the shoals of Goodwin Sands, off of the coast of England, as it is beginning its second voyage to the Indies. The wreckage is discovered more than 250 years later, in 2004.
- February 20 – The North Carolina General Assembly incorporates the town of Newton as Wilmington, North Carolina, named for Spencer Compton, 1st Earl of Wilmington and patron of Royal Governor Gabriel Johnston.
- March 16 – King Edward of the Miskito Indians signs a treaty making his kingdom, located on the coast of modern-day Nicaragua, a protectorate of Great Britain.
- March 25 – Construction begins on Bethesda Orphanage for boys near Savannah, Georgia, founded by George Whitefield.

=== April–June ===
- April 8 – War of the Austrian Succession: The Royal Navy captures the Spanish ship of the line Princesa off Cape Finisterre and takes her into British service.
- May 31 – Frederick II becomes King in Prussia upon the death of his father, Frederick William I.
- June 1 – Plantation Act 1740 or Naturalization Act 1740 of the Parliament of Great Britain comes into effect providing for Protestant alien immigrants (including Huguenots, and also Jews) residing in the American colonies for 7 years to receive British nationality.
- June 16 – Pour le Mérite first awarded in Prussia as a military honour.
- June 26 – War of Jenkins' Ear: Siege of Fort Mose – A Spanish column of 300 regular troops, free Black militia and Indian auxiliaries storms Britain's strategically crucial position of Fort Mose, Florida.

=== July–September ===
- July 7 – Adam Smith sets out from Scotland to take up a scholarship at Balliol College, Oxford.
- July 11 – Pogrom: Jews are expelled from Little Russia.
- August 1 – The song Rule, Britannia! is first performed at Cliveden, the country home of Frederick, Prince of Wales, in England.
- August 17 – Pope Benedict XIV succeeds Pope Clement XII, as the 247th pope.
- September 8 – Hertford College, Oxford, England, is founded for the first time.

=== October–December ===
- October 9–22 – Batavia Massacre: Troops of the Dutch East India Company massacre at least 10,000 Chinese Indonesians in Batavia.
- October 20 – Maria Theresa inherits the hereditary dominions of the Habsburg monarchy (Austria, Bohemia, Hungary and modern-day Belgium) under the terms of the Pragmatic Sanction of 1713 on the death of her father, Charles VI. Her succession to the Holy Roman Empire is contested widely because she is a woman, but she will reign for 40 years.
- November 6 – Samuel Richardson's popular and influential epistolary novel, Pamela; or, Virtue Rewarded, is published anonymously in London.
- November 14 – The University of Pennsylvania is officially established.
- December 16 – Frederick II of Prussia invades the Habsburg possession of Silesia, starting the War of the Austrian Succession.

=== Date unknown ===
- Enfield, North Carolina, is founded.
- Spain begins construction on Fort Matanzas in the Matanzas Inlet, approximately 15 miles (24 km) south of St. Augustine, Florida.
- The fairy-tale Beauty and the Beast by French novelist Gabrielle-Suzanne Barbot de Villeneuve was published.

== Births ==
- February 4 – Carl Michael Bellman, Swedish poet, composer (d. 1795)
- February 15 – Juan Andrés, Spanish Jesuit (d. 1817)
- February 16 – Giambattista Bodoni, Italian publisher and engraver (d. 1813)
- February 17 – John Sullivan, American General in the American Revolutionary War, delegate in the Continental Congress (d. 1795)
- March – Johann van Beethoven, German musician, father of Ludwig van Beethoven (d. 1792)
- March 16 – Johann Jacob Schweppe, German-born inventor, founder of the Schweppes Company (d. 1821)
- April 7 – Haym Salomon, Polish-Jewish American financier of the American Revolution (d. 1785)
- April 14 – Anna Strong, Patriot spy during the American Revolutionary War (d. 1812)
- May 7 – Nikolai Arkharov, Russian police chief (d. 1814)

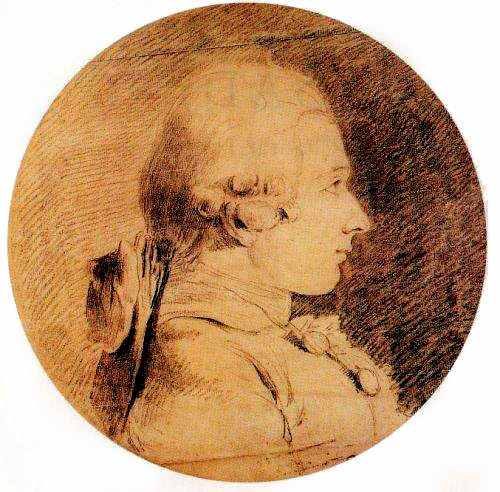
Marquis de Sade

- June 2 – Marquis de Sade, French author, for whom sadism is named (d. 1814)
- June 24 – Juan Ignacio Molina, Spanish-Chilean Jesuit priest, naturalist, historian, translator, geographer, botanist, ornithologist and linguist (d. 1829)
- June 27 – James Woodforde, English clergyman and diarist (d. 1803)
- July 27 – Jeanne Baret, French explorer (d. 1807)
- August 23 – Emperor Ivan VI of Russia (d. 1764)
- August 26 – Joseph-Michel Montgolfier, French inventor (d. 1810)
- September 12 – Johann Heinrich Jung, German writer (d. 1817)
- September 23 – Empress Go-Sakuramachi of Japan (d. 1813)
- September 25 – Hercules Mulligan, tailor and spy during the American Revolutionary War (d. 1825)
- October 29 – James Boswell, Scottish author (d. 1795)
- October 31 – Philip James de Loutherbourg, English artist (d. 1812)
- December – Elisabeth Olin, Swedish opera singer (d. 1828)

=== Date unknown ===
- Ali Pasha of Ioannina, Albanian ruler (d. 1822)
- Margaret Bingham, Countess of Lucan, born Margaret Smith, English portrait miniature painter and writer (d. 1814)
- John Milton, American politician and officer of the Continental Army (d. 1817) (earliest estimated date of birth)
- Septimanie d'Egmont, French salonist (d. 1773)

== Deaths ==
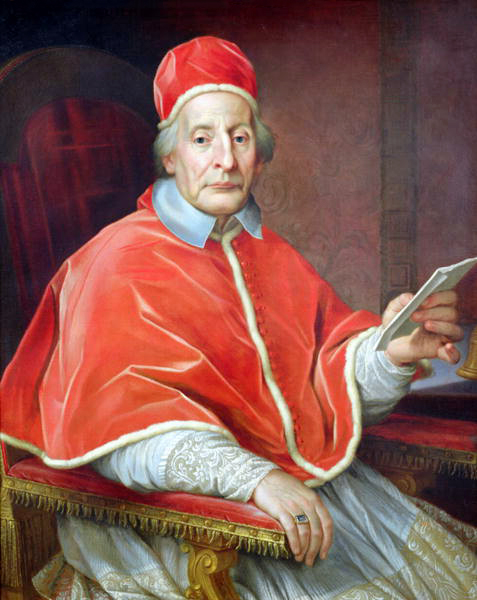
Pope Clement XII

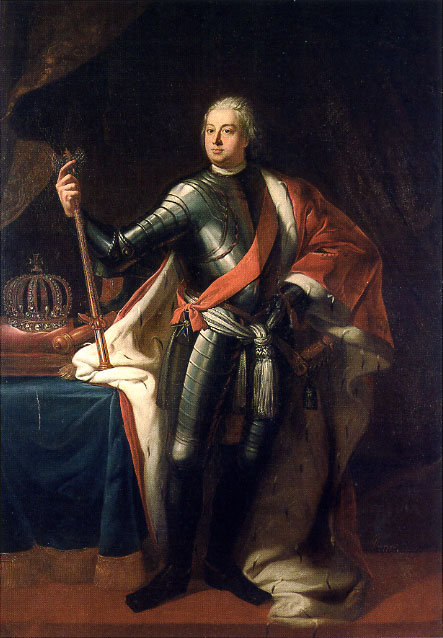
Frederick William I, King in Prussia

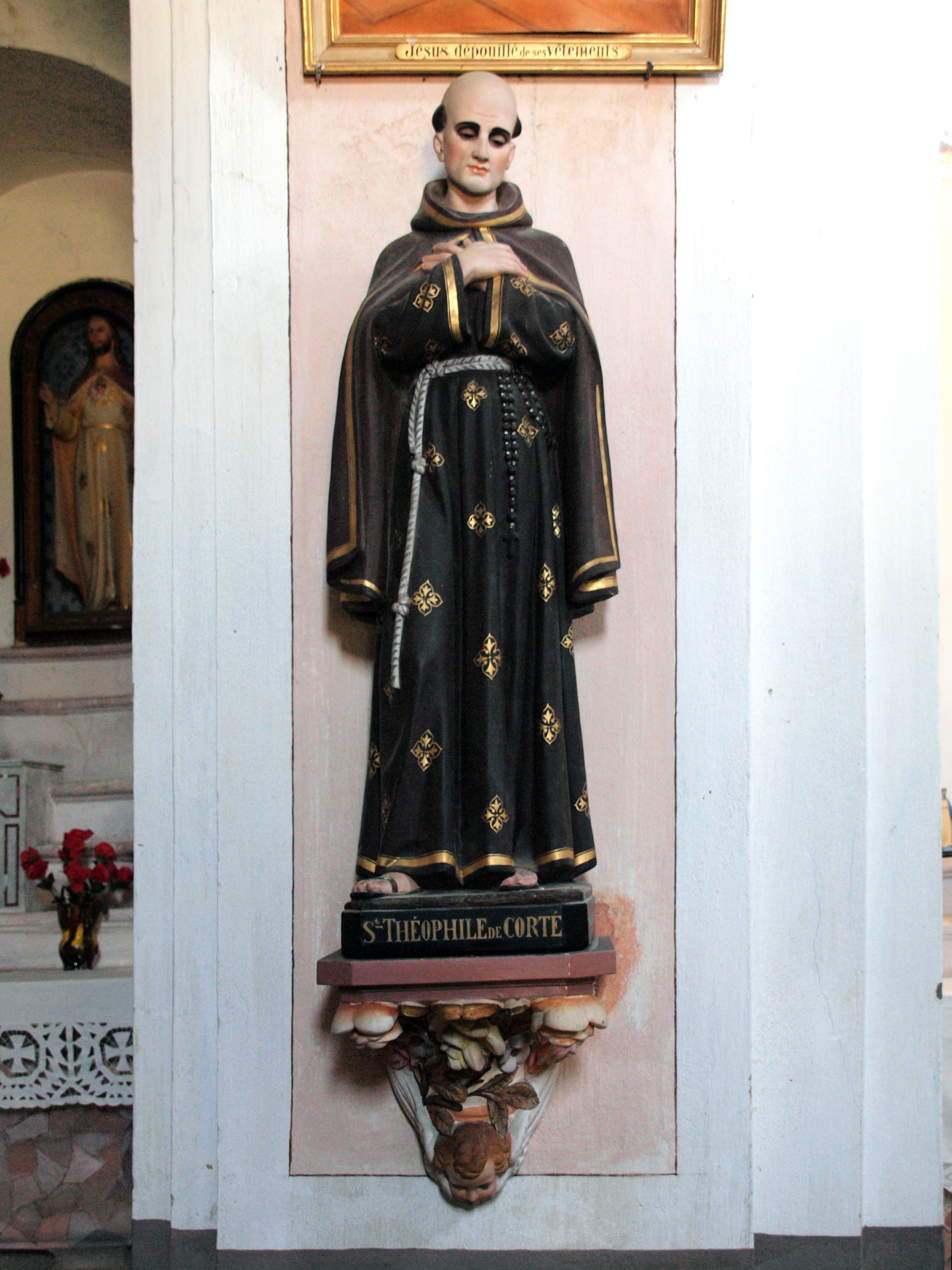
Saint Theophilus of Corte

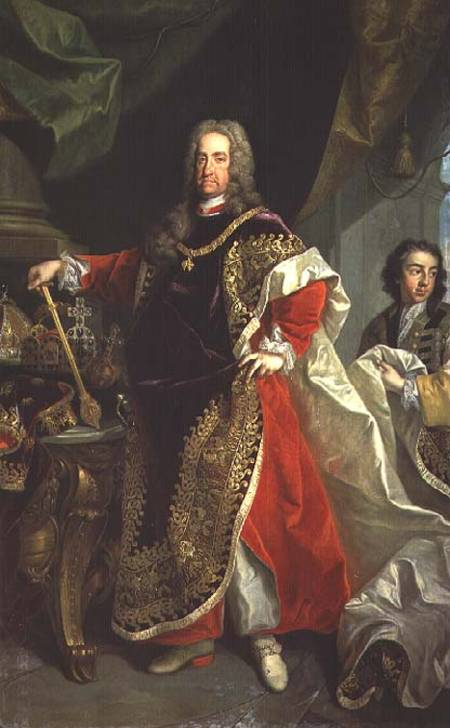
Charles VI, Holy Roman Emperor

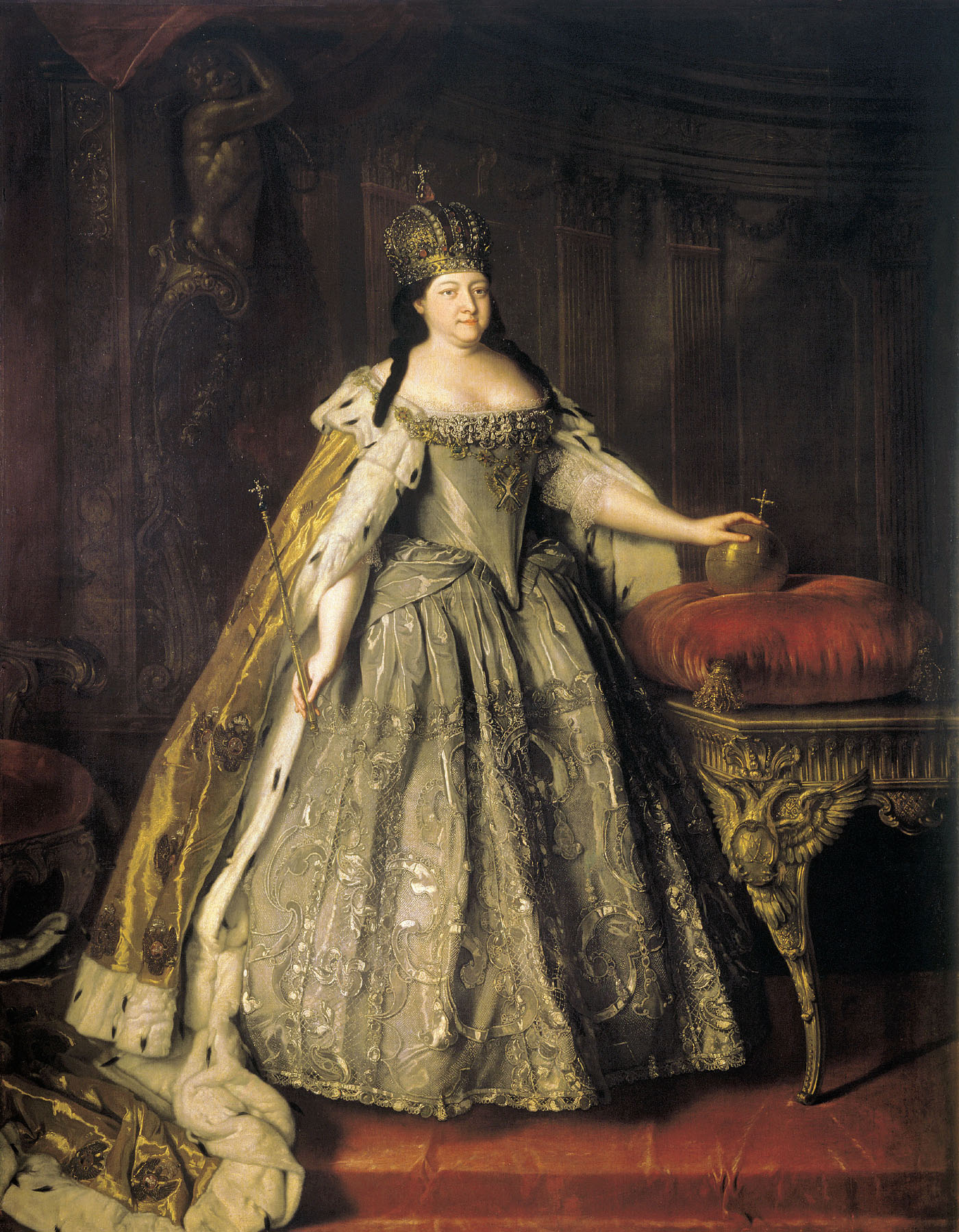
Anna, Empress of Russia

- January – Louise Élisabeth de Joybert, politically active Canadian governors' wife (b. 1673)
- January 5 – Antonio Lotti, Italian composer (b. 1667)
- January 17 – Matthias Buchinger, German artist (b. 1674)
- January 20 – Niccolò Comneno Papadopoli, Italian jurist of religious law and historian (b. 1655)
- January 21 – Nicholas Trott, colonial magistrate, South Carolina Chief Justice (b. 1663)
- January 27 – Louis Henri, Duke of Bourbon, Prime Minister of France (b. 1692)
- January 29 – Richard Lumley, 2nd Earl of Scarbrough (b. 1686)
- February 6 – Pope Clement XII (b. 1652)
- February 23 – Massimiliano Soldani Benzi, Italian artist (b. 1656)
- February 29 – Pietro Ottoboni, Italian cardinal (b. 1667)
- March 23 – Olof Rudbeck the Younger, Swedish scientist and explorer (b. 1660)
- April 28 – Bajirao I, Great Maratha warrior and Prime Minister of Marartha Empire (b.1700)
- April 23 – Thomas Tickell, English writer (b. 1685)
- May 17 – Jean Cavalier, French Protestant rebel leader (b. 1681)
- May 31 – Frederick William I, King in Prussia (b. 1688)
- June 1 – Samuel Werenfels, Swiss theologian (b. 1657)
- June 6 – Alexander Spotswood, British governor of Virginia Colony (b. 1676)
- June 17
  - Theophilus of Corte, Italian Roman Catholic priest, preacher and missionary, canonized (b. 1676)
  - William Wyndham, English politician (b. 1687)
- June 18 – Piers Butler, 3rd Viscount Galmoye, Anglo-Irish nobleman (b. 1652)
- July 2 – Thomas Baker, English antiquarian (b. 1656)
- September 20 – Francis Scobell, English politician (b. 1664)
- October 5 – Johann Philipp Baratier, German scholar (b. 1721)
- October 11 – Princess Magdalena Augusta of Anhalt-Zerbst, Duchess of Saxe-Gotha-Altenburg (b. 1679)
- October 20 – Charles VI, Holy Roman Emperor (b. 1685)
- October 28 – Anna, Empress of Russia (b. 1693)
- December 1 – John Abernethy, Irish Protestant minister (b. 1680)
- December 20 – Richard Boyle, 2nd Viscount Shannon, British military officer and statesman (b. 1675)
- December 30 – John Senex, English geographer (b. ca. 1678)
