= The Modern Eco Village =

La Joya de Planes The Modern Eco Village
- Development plan
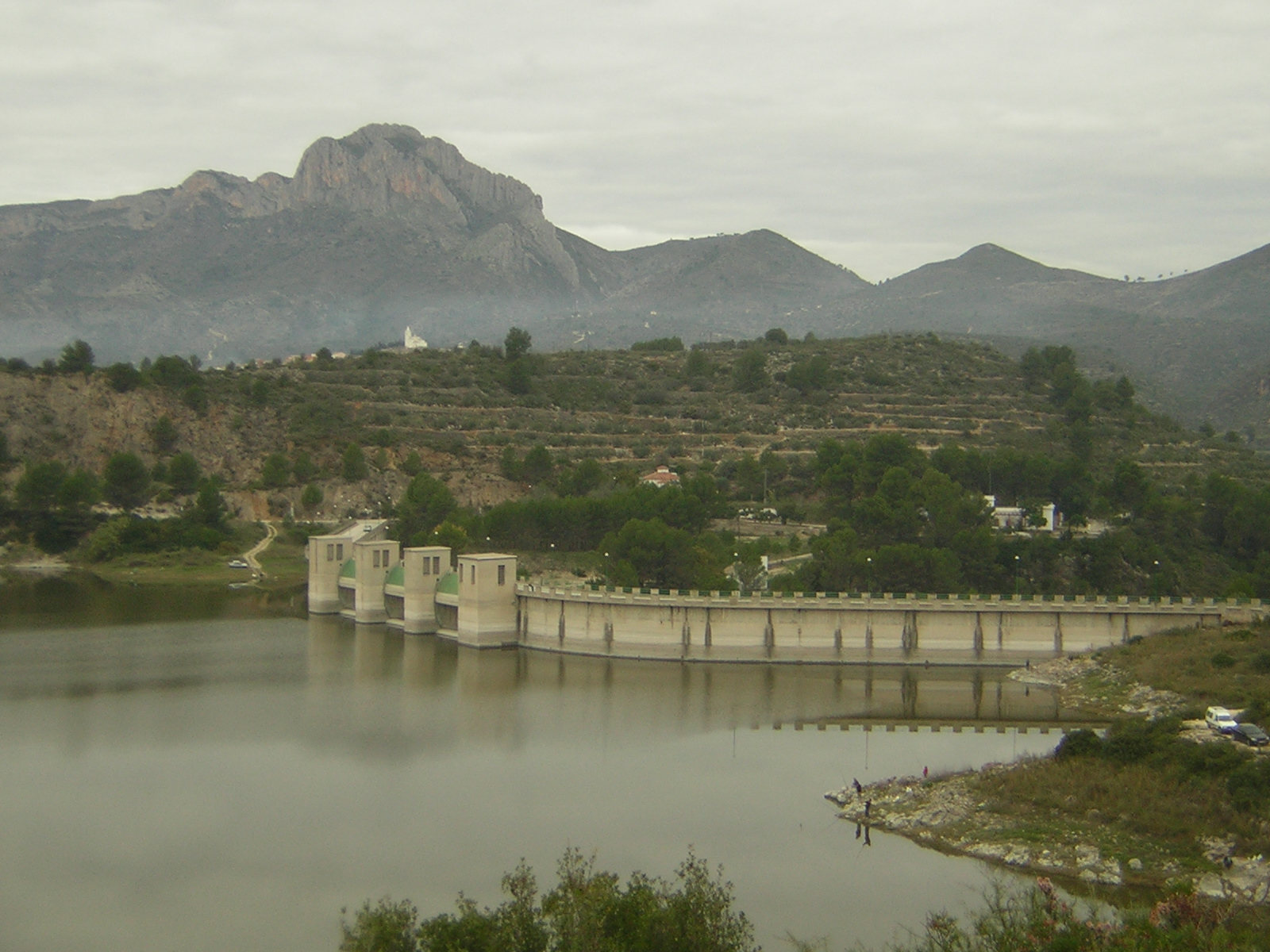

- Location within Spain Location within Valencian Community Location within Europe
- Coordinates: 38°47′54″N 0°21′28″W
- Country: Spain
- Autonomous Community: Valencian Community
- Province: Alicante
- Comarca: Comtat
- Time zone: CET (GMT +1)
  - Summer (DST): CEST (GMT +2)
- Postcode: 03828
- Website: The Modern Eco Village

The Modern Eco Village is a proposed urban development plan to be built in the town of Planes, in the Comtat region of Spain.

Located immediately next to the Beniarrés Dam, inside of its 500,000 m2 area is included the Mas Blau, a rural construction currently abandoned, which became municipal property following the agreement between the developer Vicens Ash Inversiones SL and the city council for the realization of the original urban development project.

The original urbanization project was named La Joya de Planes and included two urban developments: Mas de la Foieta I, with 295 proposed homes, and Mas de la Foieta II, with 140. The operation replaced an initial proposal for horse breeding farms discarded by the city council.

== La Joya de Planes ==
Despite protests on ecological grounds from neighboring municipalities, who demanded environmental and non-residential use of the area around the dam, in October 2006 work began on the first of two urban developments, in order to delimit the areas where the houses would be built, as well as the sidewalks, streets and bike lanes.

In the wake of the 2008 housing crisis in Spain, the construction was abandoned after spending 3 million euros in the works. The construction was left in a state described as slummy by researcher Jordi Tormo, and the municipal council confiscated the 600 000 euros bail from the construction company. In March 2008, with the construction already abandoned, a fire burned 1,500 square metres (16,000 sq ft) of forest. Three months later, a new investing group announced they would complete the construction of the first proposed urban development of 295 houses, which never happened.

In 2009, the Ministry of Environment fined the construction company, now defunct, with 132 000 because of unauthorized works in the bed of a ravine near the swamp.

== See also ==
- Tourism in Spain
