= Lorenzo Hervás =

Spanish Jesuit and famous philologist

The Reverend Lorenzo Hervás SJ
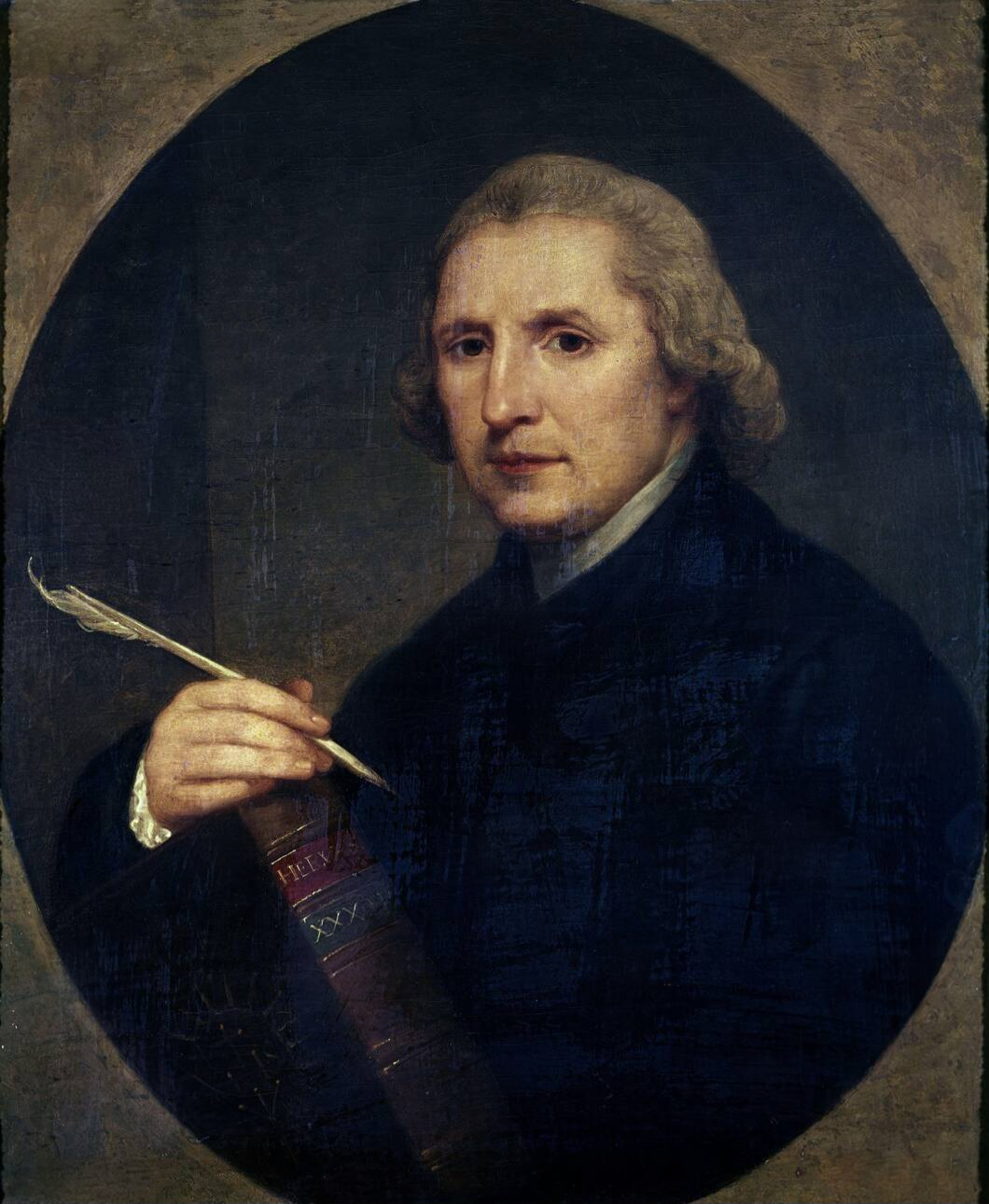
- Lorenzo Hervas (1794), by Angelica Kauffmann
- Born: Lorenzo García y Panduro; 1 May 1735; Horcajo de Santiago, Spanish Empire
- Died: 24 August 1809 (aged 74); Rome, Papal States
- Occupations: Priest; scholar; philologist
- Known for: Contributions to world history and comparative linguistics
- Movement: Spanish Universalist School of the 18th century

Lorenzo Hervás y Panduro was a Spanish Jesuit and philologist; born at Horcajo, 1 May 1735; died at Rome, 24 August 1809. He is one of the most important authors, together with Juan Andrés, Antonio Eximeno or Celestino Mutis, of the Spanish Universalist School of the 18th century.

== Biography ==
Having entered the Jesuit order at Madrid, he studied at Alcalá de Henares, devoting himself with special zeal to architecture and linguistics. For a time he taught at the royal seminary in Madrid and at the Jesuit college of Murcia; then he went to the Americas as a missionary and remained there until 1767, when in connection with the abolition of the Jesuits the establishments of the Society were taken away from the order. Hervás now returned to Europe, taking up residence first at Cesena, Italy, then in 1784 at Rome. In 1799 he went back to his native land, but four years later left Spain and lived in Rome for the remainder of his life. He was held in high honour; Pope Pius VII made him prefect of the Quirinal library, and he was a member of several learned academies. In Italy he had a chance to meet many Jesuits who had flocked thither from all parts of the world after the suppression of the order. He availed himself diligently of the exceptional opportunity thus afforded him of gaining information about remote and unknown idioms that could not be studied from literary remains. The results of his studies he laid down in a number of works, first in Italian, and subsequently translated into Spanish.

== Works ==
=== Idea dell'Universo ===
The greatest work of Hervás is the huge, Italian treatise on cosmography, Idea dell'Universo ("Idea of the Universe") (Cesena, 1778–87, in 21 vols. in 4to). It consists of several parts, almost all of which were translated into Spanish and appeared as separate works.

Of these the most important, which had appeared separately in Spanish in 1784, is entitled Catálogo de las lenguas de las naciones conocidas, y numeración división y clase de éstas según la diversidad de sus idiomas y dialectos ("Catalog of the languages of the known nations, with a class division and numbering according to the diversity of its languages and dialects") (Madrid, 1800-5 6 vols.). Here Hervás attempts to investigate the origin and ethnological relationship of different nations on the basis of language. The main object of the book, therefore, is not really philological.

Volume I covers American races and idioms, volume II those of the islands in the Indian and Pacific Oceans; the remaining volumes, devoted to the European languages, are inferior in value to the first two. The American dialects are certainly better described and classified than they had been before; the existence of a Malay and Polynesian speech family is established. For determining affinity in languages similarity in grammar is emphasized as against mere resemblance in vocabulary. While there were gross errors and defects in the work, it is conceded that it presented its materials with scholarly accuracy and thus proved useful to later investigators.

Other parts of the work to appear separately in Italian and later in Spanish were:

- Virilità dell'Uomo ("Manhood of Men") (4 vols., 1779–80)
- Vecchiaja e morte dell'Uomo ("Old age and death of Man") (1780)
- Viaggio estatico al Mondo planetario ("Ecstatic Journey around the World") (1780)
- Storia della Terra ("The History of Earth") (1781–83, 6 vols.)
- Origine, formazione, mecanismo ed armonia degl' idiomi ("Origin, formation, mechanics and harmony of Languages") (1785)
- Vocabolario, Poliglotto, con prolegomeni sopra più di CL lingue ("Vocabulary, Multilingualism, with introduction to more than 150 languages") (1787)
- Saggio practicco delle Lingue con prolegomeni e una raccolta di orazioni dominicali in più di trecento lingue e dialetti ("Wise Language practice with introduction and a collection of dominical prayers in more than three hundred languages and dialects") (1787)

=== Other works ===
Hervás wrote a number of educational works for the deaf, the most notable being La Escuela Española de Sordo-mudos ó Arte para enseñarles á escribir y hablar el idioma español ("The Spanish School of Art for Deaf-mutes, or the Art of teaching to write and speak the Spanish language") (Madrid, 1795). He also produced a number of controversial or theological tracts.

Other miscellaneous works by Hervás include:

- Descripción de los archivos de la corona de Aragón y Barcelona ("Description of the records of the kings of Aragon and Barcelona")(Cartagena, 1801)
- Historia de la Escritura ("History of Writing")
- Paleografía universal ("Universal Paleography")
- Moral de Confucio ("the Moral of Confucius")
- Historia de las primeras colonias de América ("History of the first American colonies")
- El hombre vuelto á la religión ("The man turned to religion")

== Linguistics ==
Some lenguas matrices (language families) listed by Lorenzo Hervás y Panduro are:

1. Tupí, Guaraní, Homagua [Omagua-Campeva], and “Brasile volgare” (Tupí-Guaraní languages)
2. Guaicurú [Kadiweu], Abipón, and Mocobí (Guaicuruan languages)
3. Lule and Vilela (Lule-Vilelan languages)
4. Maipure and Moxa [Moxo] (Arawakan languages)
