= Juan Andrés =

Spanish Jesuit priest, Christian humanist and literary critic

The Reverend Juan Andrés SJ
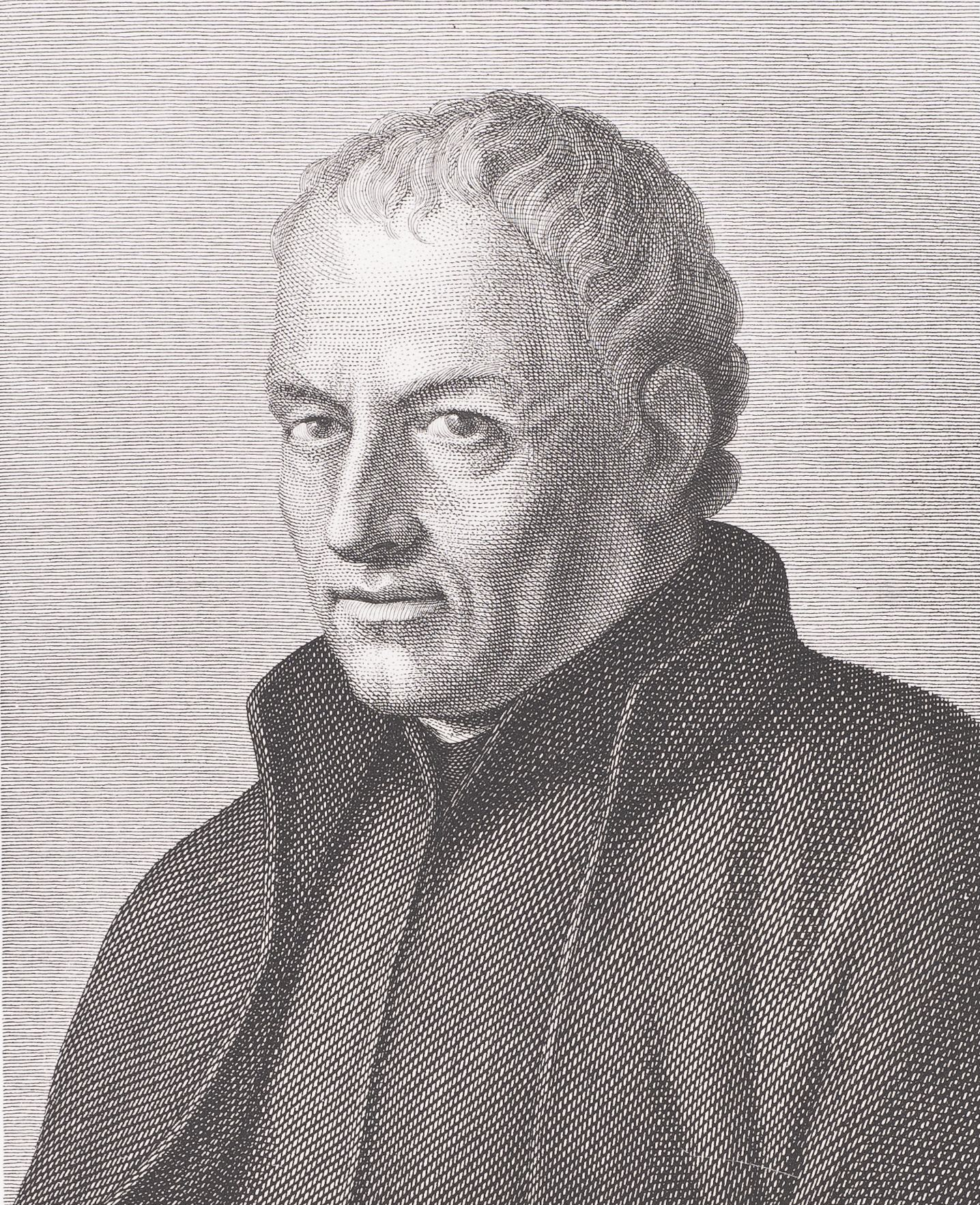
- Engraved portrait of Juan Andrés by Guglielmo Morghen
- Born: Juan Andrés y Morell; 15 February 1740; Planes, Spain, Spanish Empire
- Died: 12 February 1817 (aged 76); Rome, Papal States
- Occupations: Priest; scholar; linguist
- Known for: Contributions to world history and comparative literature
- Movement: Spanish Universalist School of the 18th century

Juan Andrés y Morell (15 February 1740 in Planes, Alicante – 12 January 1817 in Rome) was a Spanish Jesuit priest, Christian humanist and literary critic of the Age of Enlightenment. He was the creator of world history and comparative literature (i.e. of Letters and Sciences of the eighteenth century) through the most important and extensive of his works: Dell'Origine, progressi e stato d'ogni attuale letteratura (1st ed. Italian, Parma, 1782–1799) – Origen, progresos y estado actual de toda la literatura (Madrid, 1784–1806, but was incomplete as it did not include the part devoted to the ecclesiastical sciences) only recently restored to a critical and complete edition. He is one of the most important authors, together with Lorenzo Hervás, Antonio Eximeno, Francisco Javier Clavijero or Celestino Mutis, of the Spanish Universalist School of the 18th century.

== Scholar ==
He was considered an extraordinarily intellectual figure in the Europe of his time, but was ignored for much of the nineteenth and twentieth centuries. This was for several reasons, as much circumstantial as general interest. Andrés trained in the former University of Gandia, Juas a Professor of Rhetoric, and a young Juansuit forced into exile in Italy 1767. He first settled in Ferrara, and then the Marquis of Bianchi welcomed him to his palace in Mantua. Here, he enjoyed life with the Marquis's family, until the arrival of Napoleon, more than twenty years of happy and productive stay that allowed him to complete the major part of his work.

In England it was studied and followed mostly by Henry Hallam.

== Literary works ==
Andrés is also the author of, among many other titles, Family Letters, (Tour of Italy) (Madrid and Valencia, 1786–1800), the Spanish-language work is one of the most important of its kind and a major European piece, mainly composed of a literary-scientific and especially bibliographic journey. The thoughts of Andrés, settled in the late neoclassical Age of Enlightenment responds with a strong Spanish-Italian tradition not only identifiable with the big fellow Jesuits, victims of expulsion, most prominently Lorenzo Hervás, builder of comparative linguistics, and the great music theorist Antonio Eximeno together with whom were seen as the nucleus of the eighteenth century School of Spanish Universalists, but further amplified the line represented by Ignacio de Luzan, Ludovico Antonio Muratori and the great pioneer and genius Giambattista Vico. Andrés, with his sight almost gone at the end of his life, spent his final professional occupation in charge of the Royal Library of Naples, to finally die in Rome in the protection of his religious congregation. The first and most important volume (given the main feelings of the sense of self and the critical nature of the new edition) of his major work was republished in Madrid in 1997, it Juas completed in 2002.

== Bibliography ==
- Batllori, Miquel (1961). "ANDRÉS, Giovanni". Dizionario Biografico degli Italiani (in Italian). Vol. 3: Ammirato–Arcoleo. Rome: Istituto dell'Enciclopedia Italiana. OCLC 883370.
