= Corte, Haute-Corse =

Corte Corti
- Subprefecture and commune
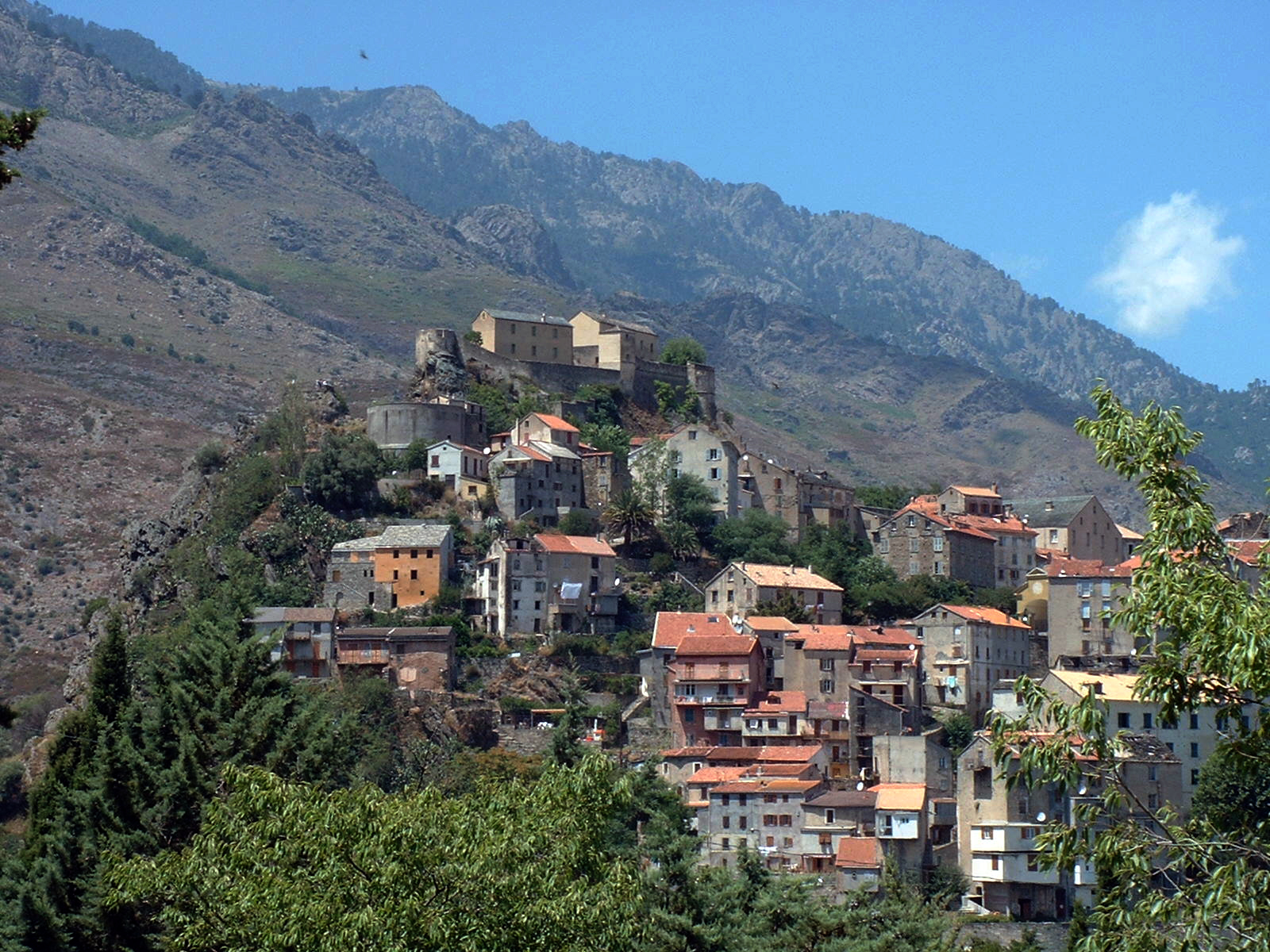
- View of the citadel

- Coat of arms
- Location of Corte
- Location within France Location within Corsica
- Coordinates: 42°18′23″N 9°09′05″E
- Country: France
- Region: Corsica
- Department: Haute-Corse
- Arrondissement: Corte
- Canton: Corte
- Intercommunality: Centre Corse

Government
  - Mayor (2020–2026): Xavier Poli
- Area^{1}: 149.27 km^{2} (57.63 sq mi)
- Elevation: 486 m (1,594 ft)
- Highest elevation: 2,626 m (8,615 ft)
- Lowest elevation: 299 m (981 ft)
- Population (2023): 7,819
  - Density: 52.38/km^{2} (135.7/sq mi)
- Demonym(s): Cortenais(e) (French) cortenese (Italian) cortinese, curtinese (Corsican)
- Time zone: UTC+01:00 (CET)
  - Summer (DST): UTC+02:00 (CEST)
- INSEE/Postal code: 2B096 /20250
- ^{1} French Land Register data, which excludes lakes, ponds, glaciers > 1 km^{2} (0.386 sq mi or 247 acres) and river estuaries.

Corte (/ˈkɔːrteɪ/, /ˈkɔːrti/; French: [kɔʁte]; Italian: [ˈkorte]; Corsican: Corti, [ˈkorti]) is a commune in the Haute-Corse department, on the island of Corsica, France.

It is the fifth-largest commune in Corsica after Ajaccio, Bastia, Porto-Vecchio and Borgo.

== Administration ==
Corte is a subprefecture of the Haute-Corse department.

== History ==
Corte was the capital of the Corsican independent state during the period of Pasquale Paoli.

During World War I, German prisoners of war were kept in the Citadel.

== Population ==
Historical population

Year	Pop.	±% p.a.
1800	2,092	—
1806	3,073	+6.62%
1821	2,735	−0.77%
1831	3,282	+1.84%
1836	3,587	+1.79%
1841	3,505	−0.46%
1846	4,599	+5.58%
1851	4,719	+0.52%
1856	4,676	−0.18%
1861	5,754	+4.24%
1866	6,094	+1.15%
1872	5,426	−1.92%
1876	5,018	−1.94%
1881	5,136	+0.47%
1886	5,002	−0.53%
1891	5,029	+0.11%
1896	5,000	−0.12%
1901	5,425	+1.64%

Year	Pop.	±% p.a.
1906	5,188	−0.89%
1911	5,211	+0.09%
1921	5,094	−0.23%
1926	5,267	+0.67%
1931	5,396	+0.49%
1936	6,014	+2.19%
1946	5,310	−1.24%
1954	5,033	−0.67%
1962	5,066	+0.08%
1968	4,948	−0.39%
1975	5,230	+0.79%
1982	5,177	−0.15%
1990	5,693	+1.19%
1999	6,329	+1.18%
2007	6,747	+0.80%
2012	7,280	+1.53%
2017	7,446	+0.45%
2023	7,819	+0.82%

Source: EHESS and INSEE (1968-2023)

== Sights ==
Sites of interest include the Fortress (A citadella), the Museum of Corsica (Museu di a Corsica), and the University of Corsica (Università di Corsica).

- Pieve Santa Mariona di Tàlcini, a ruined medieval pieve (church)

== Transport ==
National roads lead to Ajaccio and Bastia.

Corte is also linked to Ajaccio, Bastia and Calvi by the Chemin de fer de la Corse (Corsican Railway), and is served by trains running between Ajaccio and Calvi, and Ajaccio and Bastia.

== Climate ==
Corte has a hot-summer mediterranean climate (Köppen climate classification: Csa), sometimes presenting alpine conditions during the winter, with 52 summer days and 56 frost days.

Climate data for Corte, Haute-Corse (1990–2010 averages, extremes 1990–present)
Month	Jan	Feb	Mar	Apr	May	Jun	Jul	Aug	Sep	Oct	Nov	Dec	Year
Record high °C (°F)	23.8 (74.8)	22.4 (72.3)	29.2 (84.6)	27.2 (81.0)	33.1 (91.6)	36.5 (97.7)	41.1 (106.0)	39.5 (103.1)	35.3 (95.5)	31.2 (88.2)	24.8 (76.6)	21.5 (70.7)	41.1 (106.0)
Mean daily maximum °C (°F)	12.0 (53.6)	12.9 (55.2)	15.8 (60.4)	18.1 (64.6)	23.5 (74.3)	27.6 (81.7)	31.1 (88.0)	31.3 (88.3)	26.0 (78.8)	21.3 (70.3)	15.9 (60.6)	12.0 (53.6)	20.7 (69.3)
Daily mean °C (°F)	6.3 (43.3)	6.6 (43.9)	9.3 (48.7)	11.5 (52.7)	16.1 (61.0)	20.0 (68.0)	22.8 (73.0)	23.2 (73.8)	18.8 (65.8)	15.1 (59.2)	10.1 (50.2)	6.9 (44.4)	13.9 (57.0)
Mean daily minimum °C (°F)	0.5 (32.9)	0.3 (32.5)	2.7 (36.9)	4.9 (40.8)	8.7 (47.7)	12.3 (54.1)	14.5 (58.1)	15.0 (59.0)	11.7 (53.1)	8.9 (48.0)	4.4 (39.9)	1.7 (35.1)	7.2 (45.0)
Record low °C (°F)	−8.3 (17.1)	−8.7 (16.3)	−8.7 (16.3)	−3.9 (25.0)	0.9 (33.6)	3.9 (39.0)	6.2 (43.2)	6.8 (44.2)	3.9 (39.0)	−0.8 (30.6)	−4.7 (23.5)	−7.5 (18.5)	−8.7 (16.3)
Average precipitation mm (inches)	68.2 (2.69)	55.1 (2.17)	49.7 (1.96)	79.1 (3.11)	57.5 (2.26)	35.7 (1.41)	29.1 (1.15)	30.7 (1.21)	53.4 (2.10)	106.6 (4.20)	116.6 (4.59)	121.5 (4.78)	803.6 (31.64)
Average precipitation days (≥ 1.0 mm)	7.3	6.4	6.7	9.1	6.4	4.4	3.0	3.8	6.5	8.5	10.6	10.2	82.6
Source: Météo France

== Education ==
Corte has become a major university town in Corsica since the Pasquale Paoli University opened up again in 1980s.

== Notable people ==
Corte was the birthplace of Joseph Bonaparte (1768–1844), the eldest brother of the French Emperor Napoleon I, who made him King of Naples (1806–1808) and Spain (1808–1813). Corte was also the birthplace of Theophilus of Corte (1676 - 1740), an Italian Roman Catholic priest and a professed member from the Order of Friars Minor.

== Gallery ==
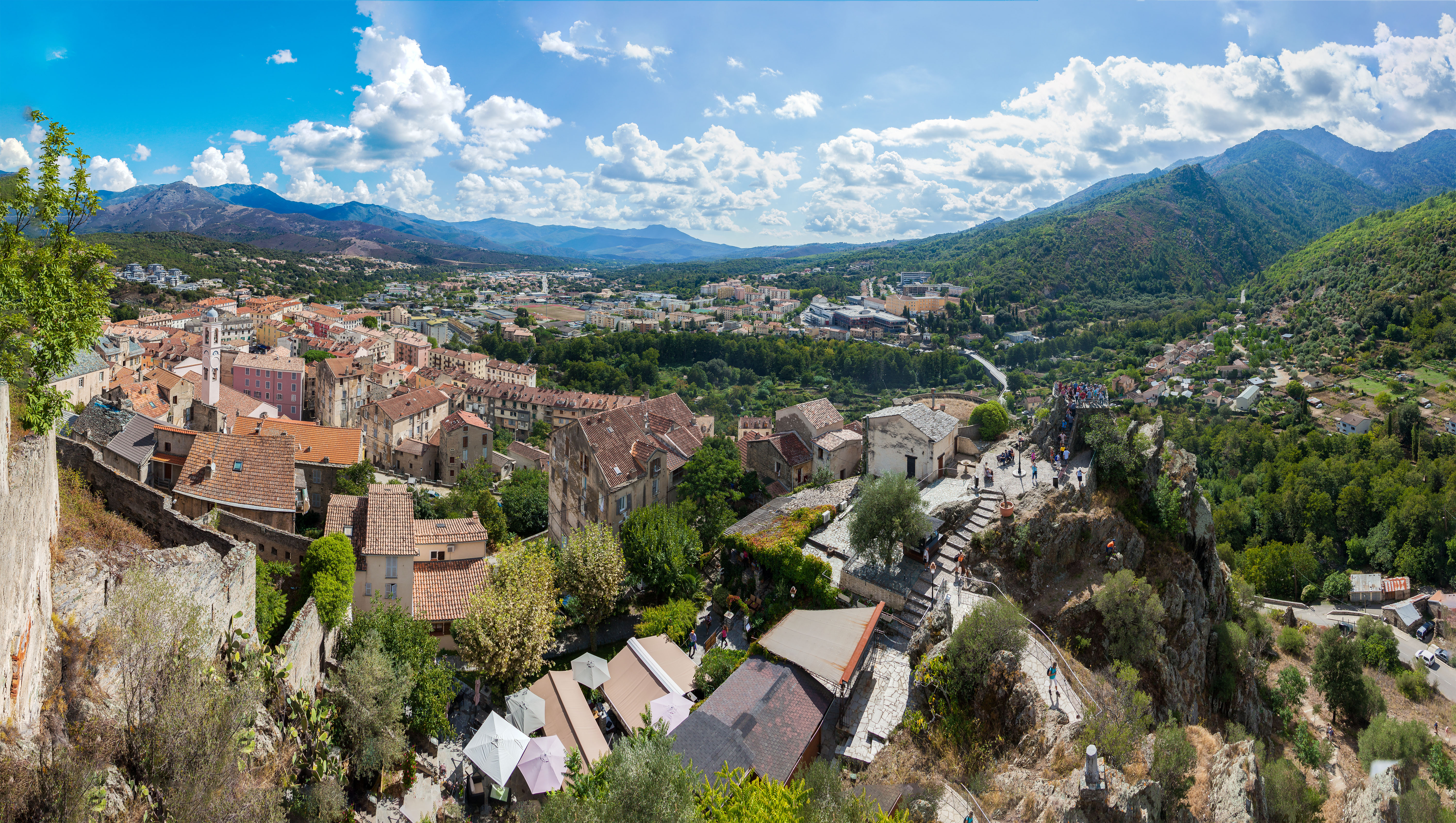
Panorama

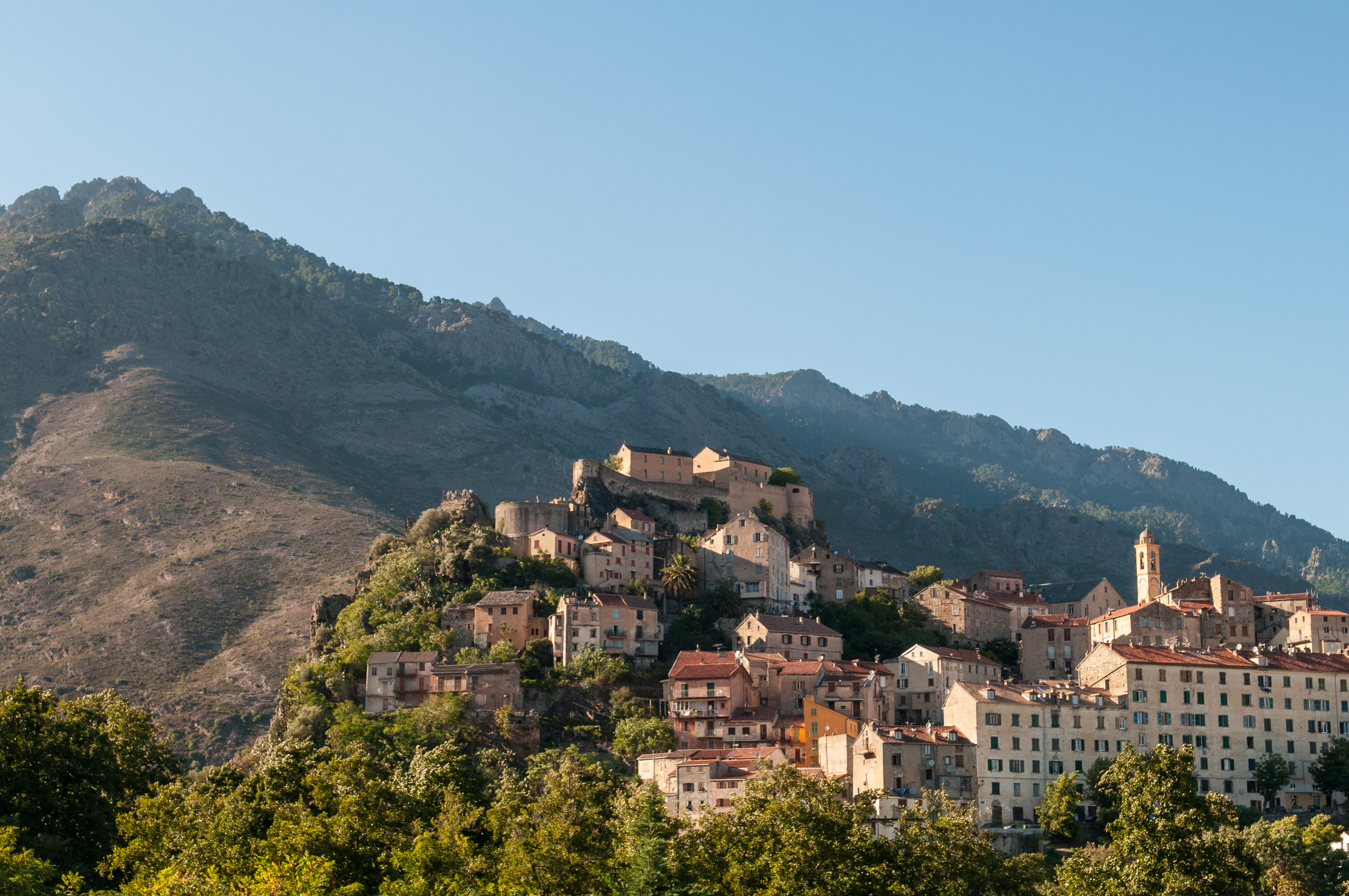
Citadel

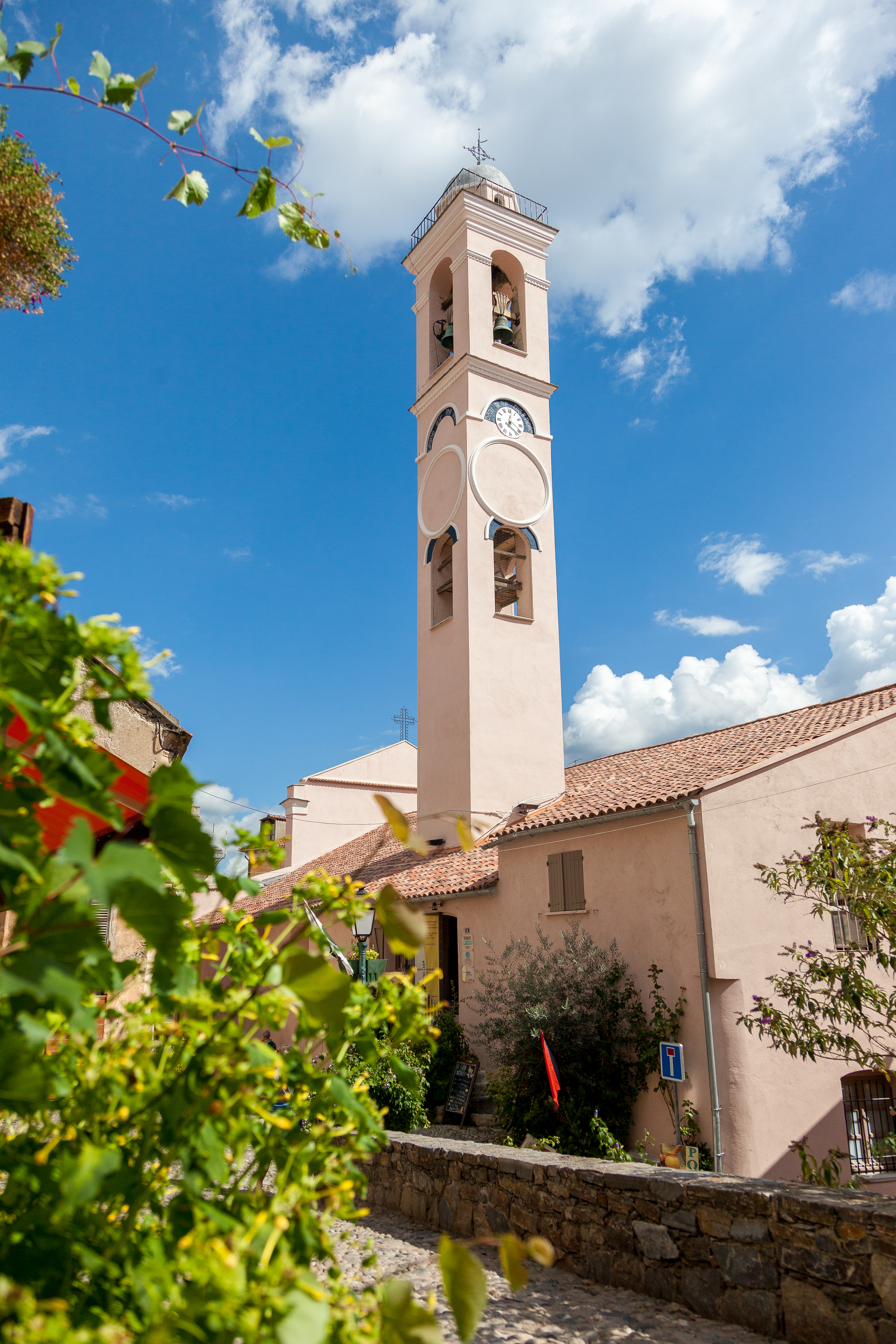
Church

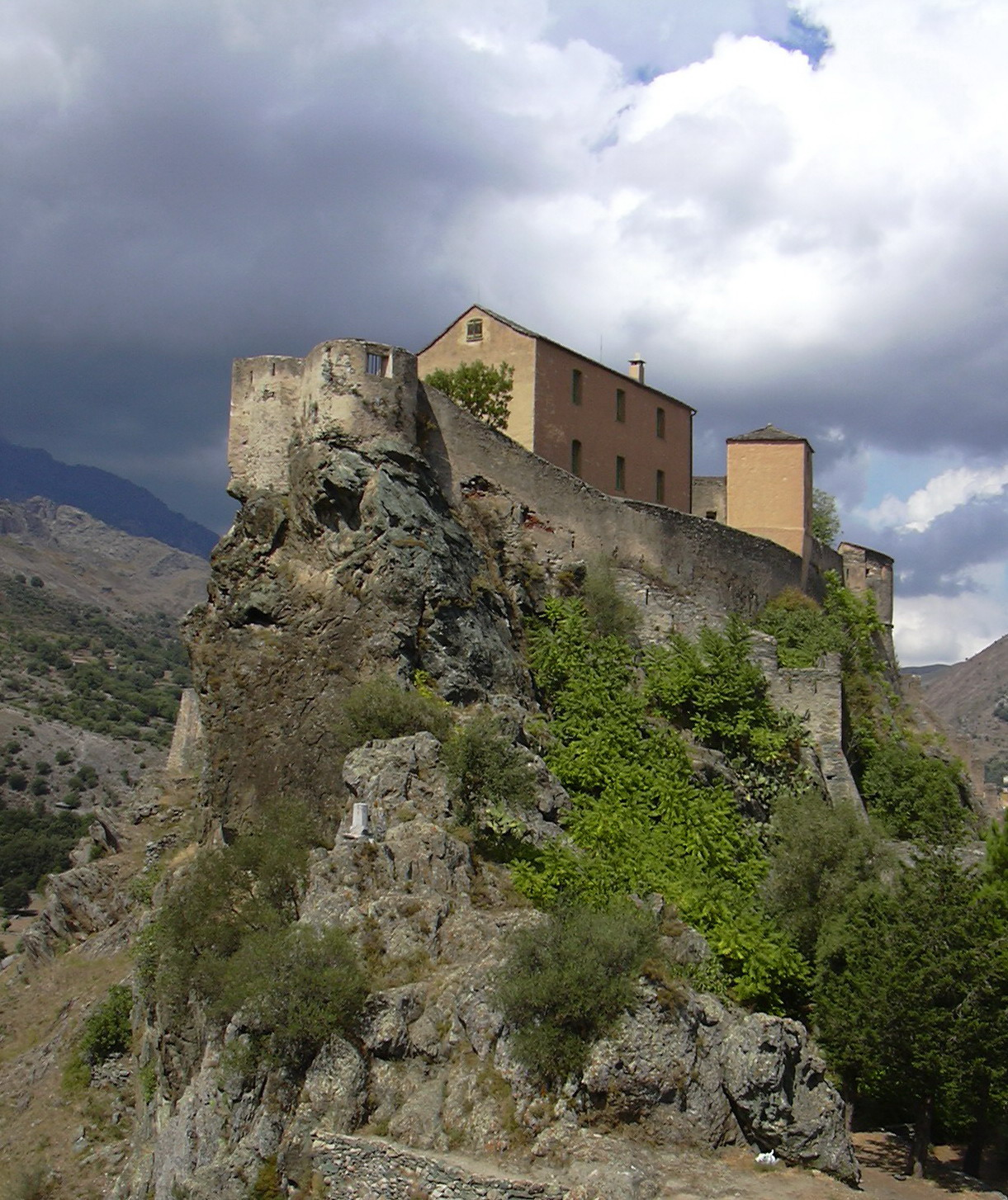
La Citadelle

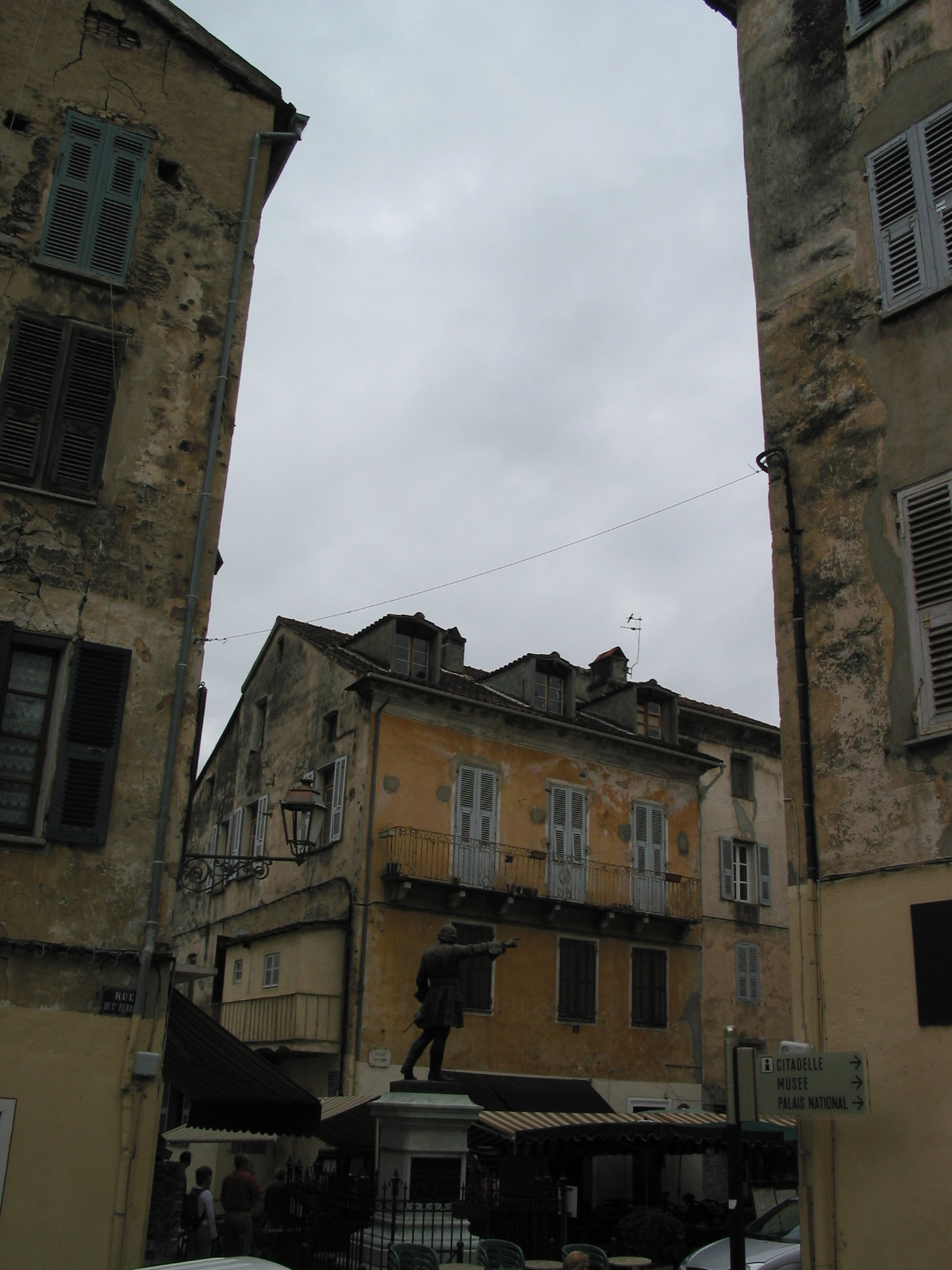
Place Gaffori, with the statue of General Ghjuvan Petru Gaffori in front of his former home

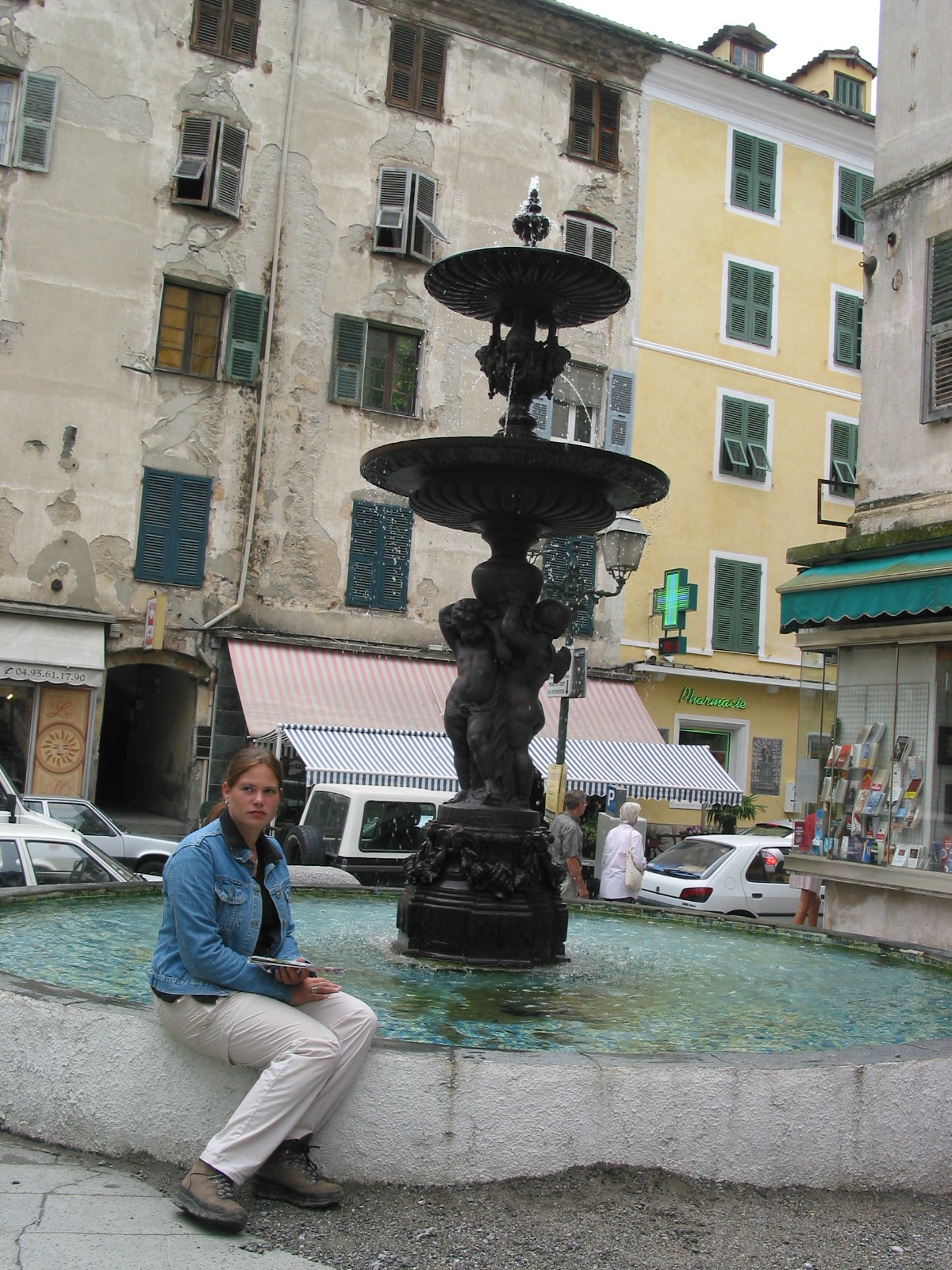
Fountain at the beginning of the boardwalk called Rampe Sainte Croix from the Cours Paoli to the Chapel of Sainte Croix

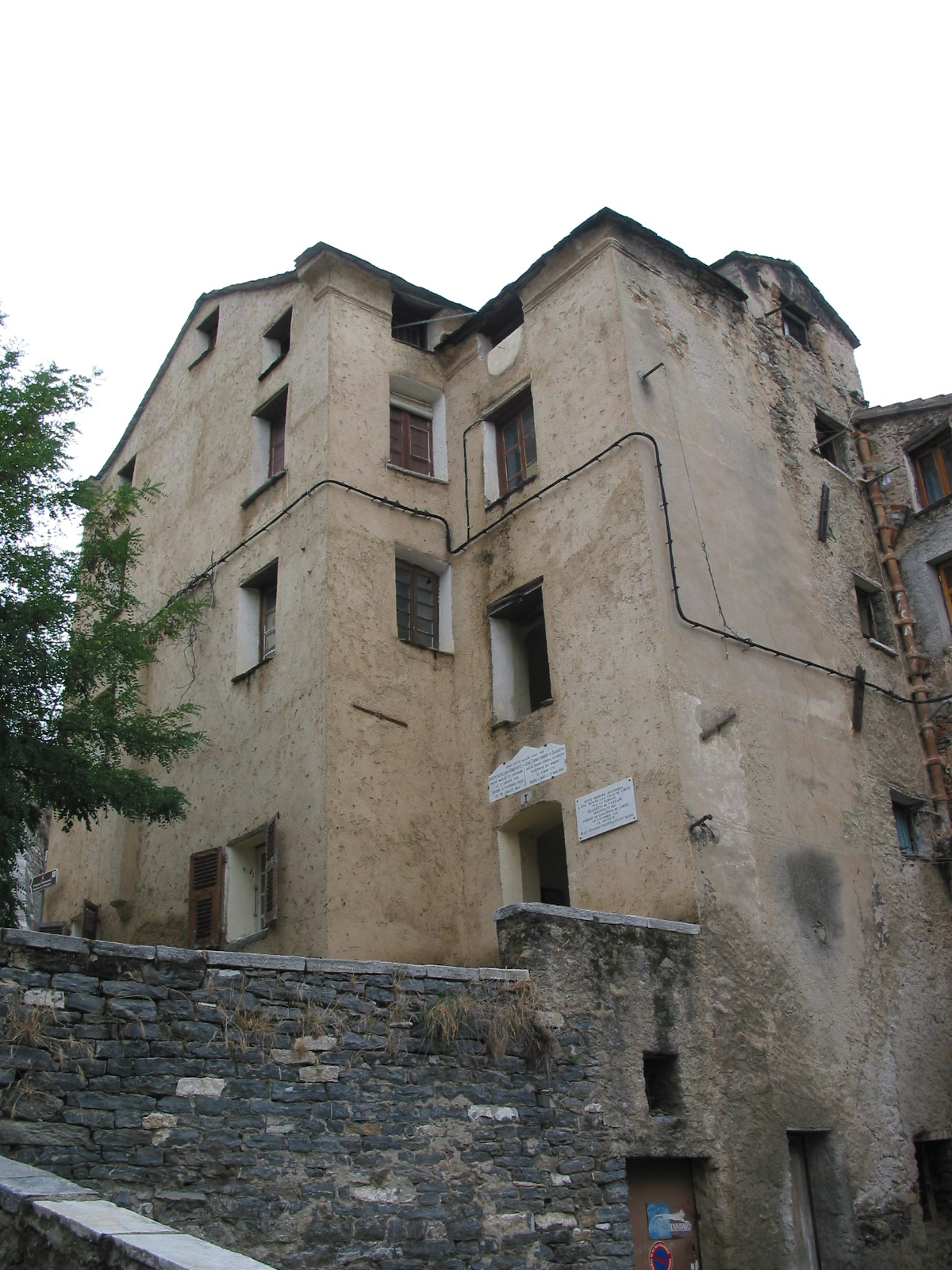
House of birth of Joseph Bonaparte (1768)

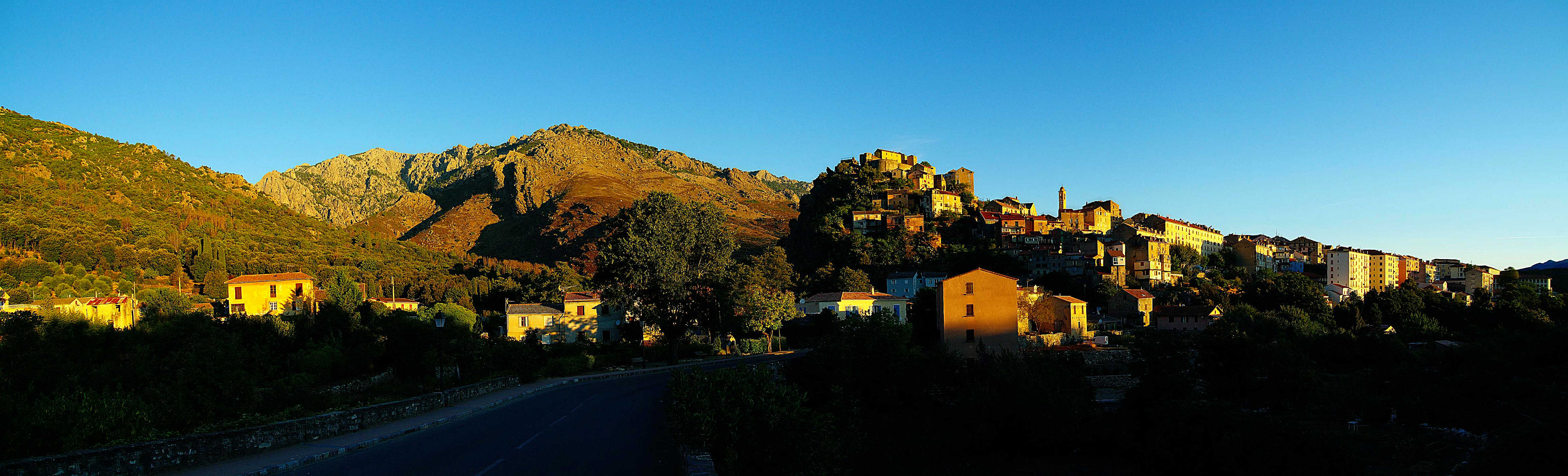
Corte Panorama created from three images recorded at the bridge over the Restonica, pont vieux

== See also ==
- Communes of the Haute-Corse department
