= Horcajo de Santiago =

- Municipality
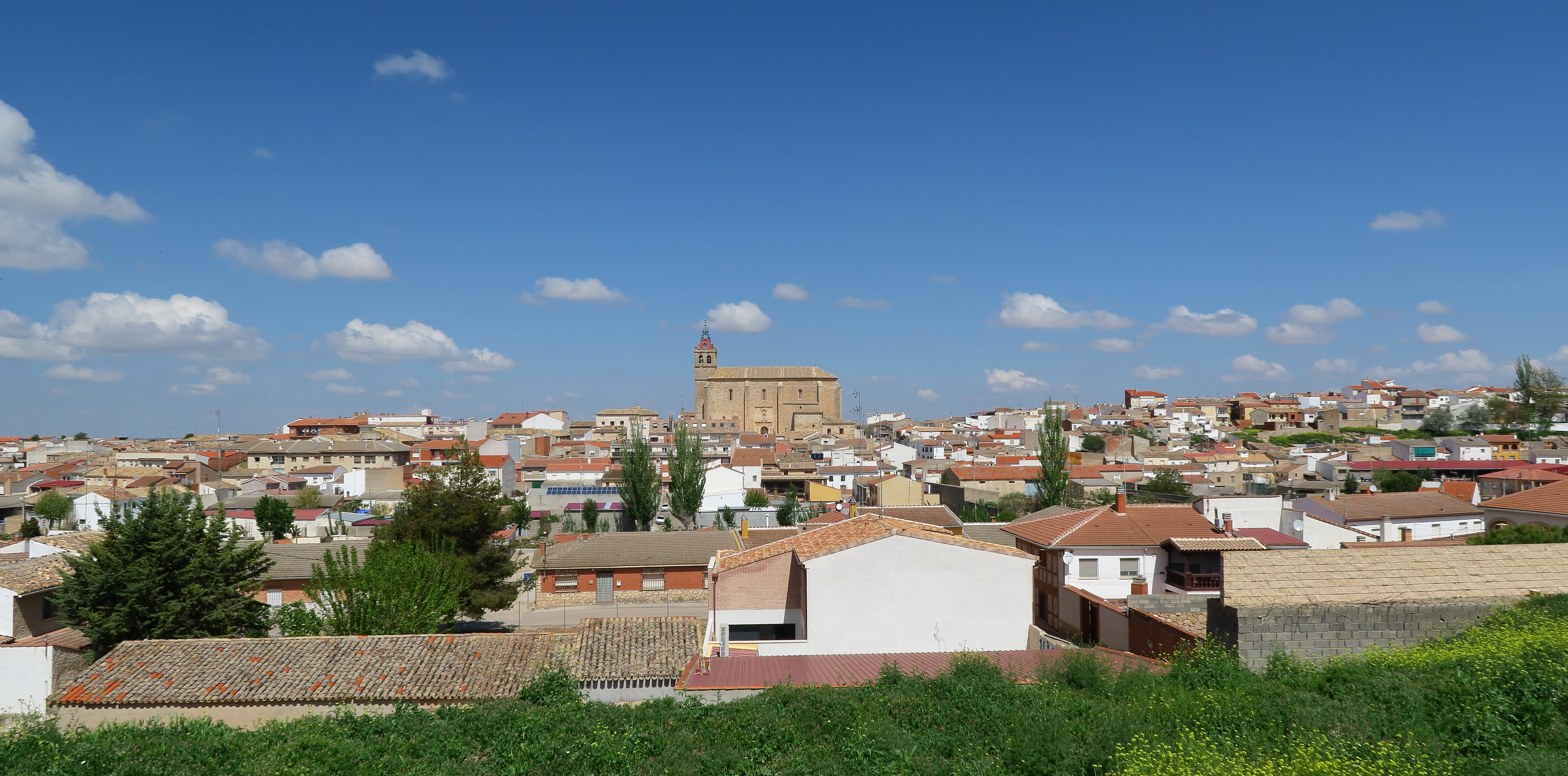

- Flag Coat of arms

- Location within Spain Location within Castilla-La Mancha
- Coordinates: 39°50′N 3°00′W
- Country: Spain
- Autonomous community: Castilla–La Mancha
- Province: Cuenca

Population (2025-01-01)
  - Total: 3,894
- Time zone: UTC+1 (CET)
  - Summer (DST): UTC+2 (CEST)

Horcajo de Santiago is a municipality in Cuenca, Castile-La Mancha, Spain. It has a population of 3,517.

== History ==
The place was settled towards 1276. Along with Belmontejo (now depopulated), it formed a commandery (encomienda) of the Order of Santiago, originally headquartered in Belmontejo and then in Horcajo.

== Notable people ==
- Lorenzo Hervás y Panduro (1735-1809)
