= Pieve Santa Mariona di Tàlcini =

Church in Corsica, France

Coordinates: 42.3218°N 9.1577°E

Pieve Santa Mariona di Tàlcini (Corsican: [ˈpjɛvɛ ˈsanta maˈrjona di ˈtaltʃini]) is a ruined medieval pieve (church) in Corsica, in the territory of the commune of Corte in the department of Haute-Corse.

Formerly located in the heart of the old Diocese of Aleria, the Pieve was built probably in the twelfth and thirteenth century by craftsmen trained in Pisan architecture in Corsica. It has the modest dimensions of 14.3 metres (47 ft) in length by 6.8 metres (22 ft) wide. In a poor state of conservation, the twin apses and stone alignment can still be seen.

Archaeological surveys were undertaken in 1973, during which the badly damaged baptismal font located in the southern part of the nave was improved.
