= Beniarrés Dam =

Dam and reservoir in Valencia, Spain

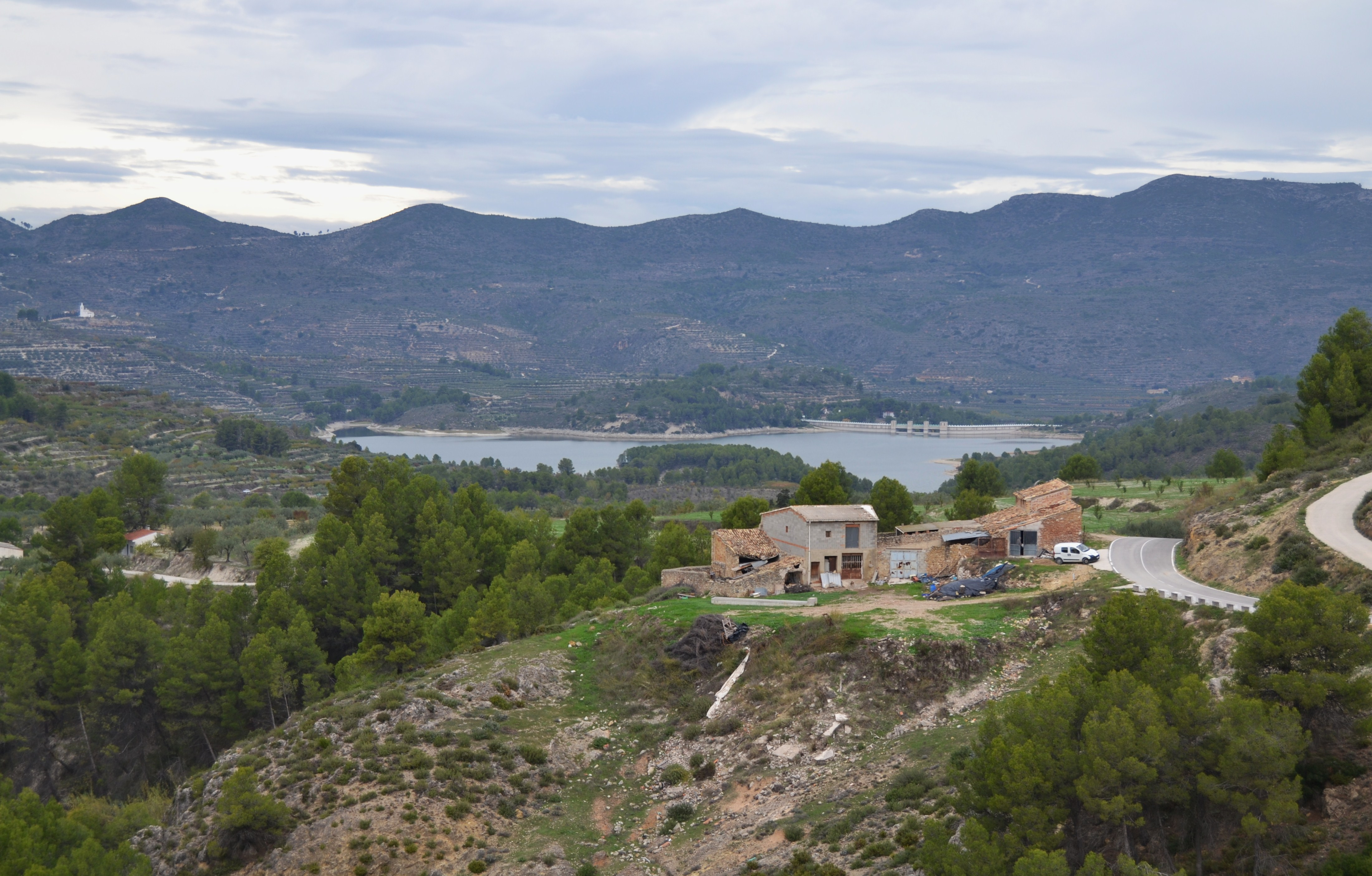
- The dam, from Planes' Castle

- Location of the dam in Valencia Beniarrés Dam (Spain)
- Interactive map of Beniarrés Dam
- Country: Spain
- Location: Beniarrés, Valencia
- Coordinates: 38°48′36″N 0°21′0″W
- Status: Completed
- Opening date: 1958; 68 years ago

Dam and spillways
- Impounds: Serpis
- Height (foundation): 39 m (128 ft)
- Elevation at crest: 400 m (1,300 ft) AMSL

Reservoir
- Total capacity: 27 hm^{3} (22,000 acre⋅ft)
- Surface area: 268 ha (660 acres)

Beniarrés Dam is a dam in the townships of Beniarrés, Alcosser and Planes, all located in Alicante, Land of Valencia, Spain.

The dam is built on the Serpis River, and is 39 metres (128 ft) high, and has a crest length of almost 400 metres (1,300 ft). The surface area of its reservoir reaches 268 hectares (660 acres), distributed between three municipalities, Beniarrés (22.3%), where the dam was built, Planes (64.9%), and Alcosser (12.8%).

Its capacity is 27 cubic hectometres (22,000 acre⋅ft) of water, although it rarely reaches its full capacity because of the droughts caused by climate change in the region, running at around 13-14% of its capacity in 2024.
