= Spanish Universalist School of the 18th century =

The Spanish Universalist School of the 18th century (Spanish: "Escuela Universalista Española del siglo XVIII") (also labelled "Hispanic", or "Hispano-Italian", known as "Spanish Universalist School") is mainly defined by Juan Andrés, Lorenzo Hervás and Antonio Eximeno as the main Authors, but also by his close collaborators: the botanist Antonio José Cavanilles and the great Americanists Francisco Javier Clavijero (Nueva España- at the moment Mexico), José Celestino Mutis (Colombia), Juan Ignacio Molina (Chili), Joaquín Camaño (Argentina), Francisco Javier Alegre and Rafael Landívar, Junípero Serra (California), the Philippine Juan de la Concepción or Miguel Casiri, a Lebanese-born Arabic-language expert.

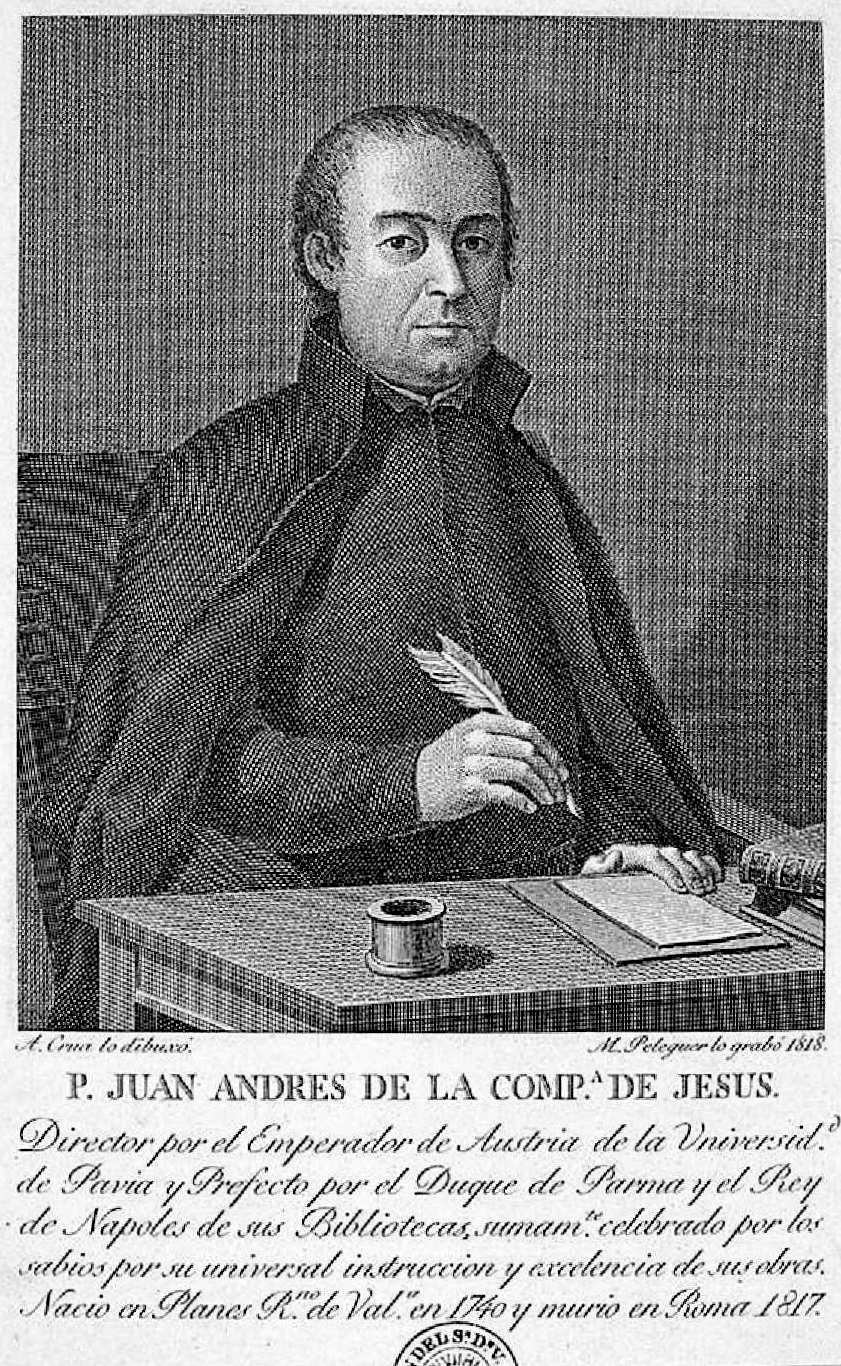
Juan Andrés (1740-1817).

This school focuses on a universal humanistic science project, bringing together various disciplines and geographic-cultural perspectives through the convergence of classical humanism with modern empirical science. Methodologically, it addresses the development of modern Comparative Studies and a universalist Enlightenment that combines human sciences with physical-natural sciences. Its work has influenced modern European culture.

Its double humanistic and theoretical dimension on one side and empirical science dimension on the other side, as an antecedent for the current era of globalization, acquires an inter-continentalist and universalist sense. The Spanish Universalist School of the 18th century largely matured in northern Italy and the second great Hispanic intellectual moment after the School of Salamanca, represent the first great European moment of the construction of a global culture in itself.

The greatest direct influence of the Spanish universalists in the Anglo-Saxon world was that of Juan Andrés on the historiographer and literary critic Henry Hallam.

== Concept and Authors ==
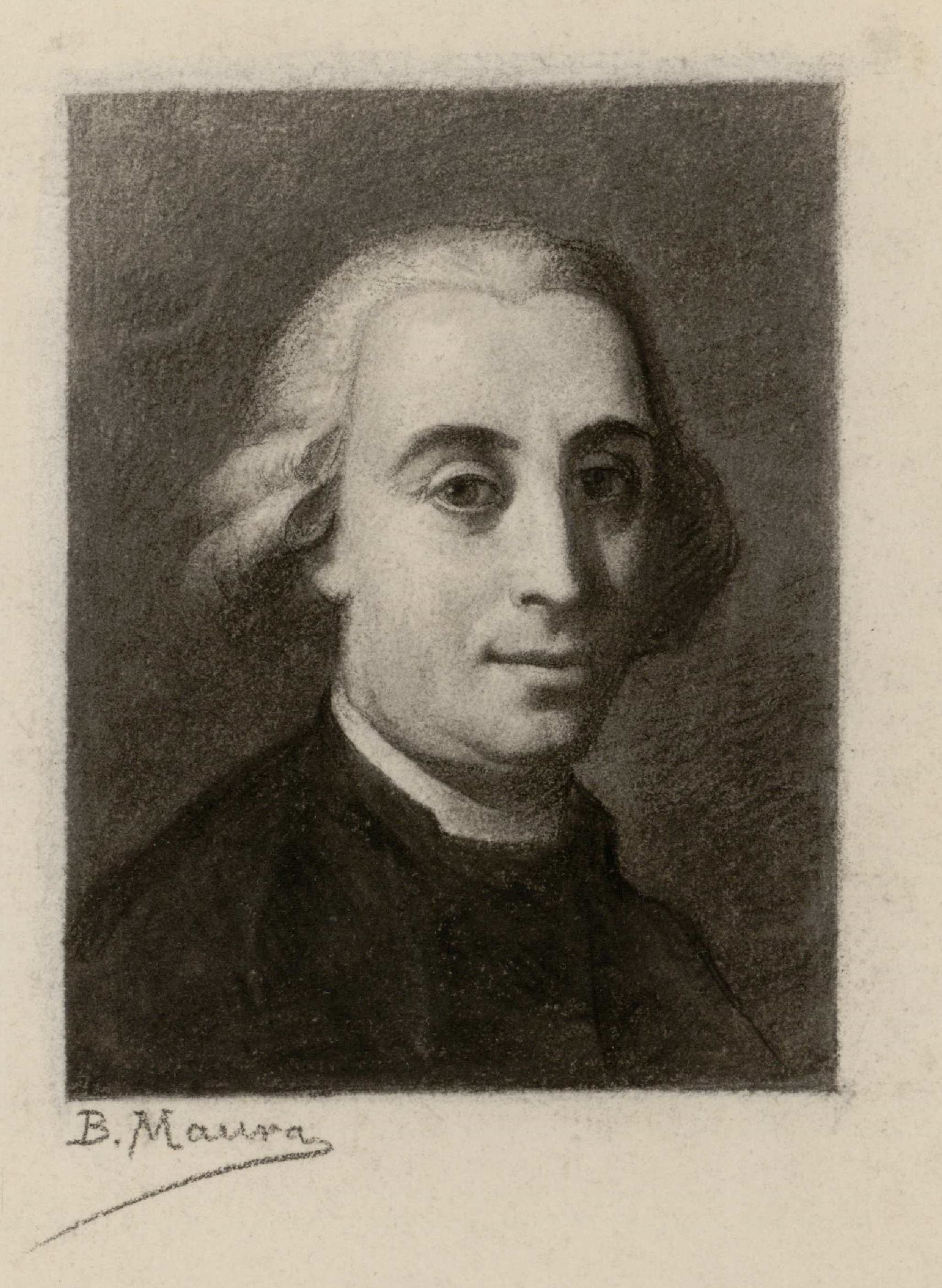
Antonio Eximeno (1729-1809)

Due to an extraordinary universalist dimension shared in their works and to the close intellectual, and even personal relationships among them, the concept of the "Spanish Universalist School of the 18th century" concerns mainly and decisively Juan Andrés, Lorenzo Hervás and Antonio Eximeno. The major works of these three expelled Jesuits (1767) represent respectively, the construction of the emerging Universal and Comparative History of the Sciences and Arts, of Languages, music and likewise, the comparative theory itself. But from a more realistic and complete insight of cultural heritage, established in Italy by Hispanic diaspora, it is attributed to approximately thirty Authors who cover a wide range and character of intellectual property.

Aside from distant and close precedents such as, on the one hand, the teachers of the University of Cervera (Mateo Aymerich, Juan Bautista Corachán) and, on the other hand, especially the multifaceted figure of Jorge Juan and his environment, as well as Pedro Murillo Velarde, creator of a Universal Geography, the school consists of the following members: firstly Miguel Casiri, librarian of El Escorial, the naturalist Antonio José Cavanilles, who can be joined by the also botanist Franco Dávila, creator of the Royal Botanical Garden of Madrid, José Celestino Mutis, director of the Expedition of New Granada, or Juan José de Cuéllar, and, among others, Vicente Requeno, Carlos Andrés, Antonio Pinazo, Joaquín Millás, Buenaventura Prats, Antonio Ludeña, José Pintado, Esteban de Terreros, Raimundo Diosdado Caballero, Juan Bautista Muñoz, Juan Sempere y Guarinos, Juan Nuix y Perpiñá, the Chilean Juan Ignacio Molina, Joaquín Camaño from La Plata, the Honduran José Lino Fábrega, the Mexicans Francisco Javier Clavijero and Pedro José Márquez. Philippines barely recherched like Juan de la Concepción, Francisco Manuel Blanco, Bernardo Bruno de la Fuente or José Antonio Tornos. Lately, certain late Enlighteners should be considered, thus the great meteorologists Benet Viñes (Havana) and Federico Faura (Manila) and even their disciples.

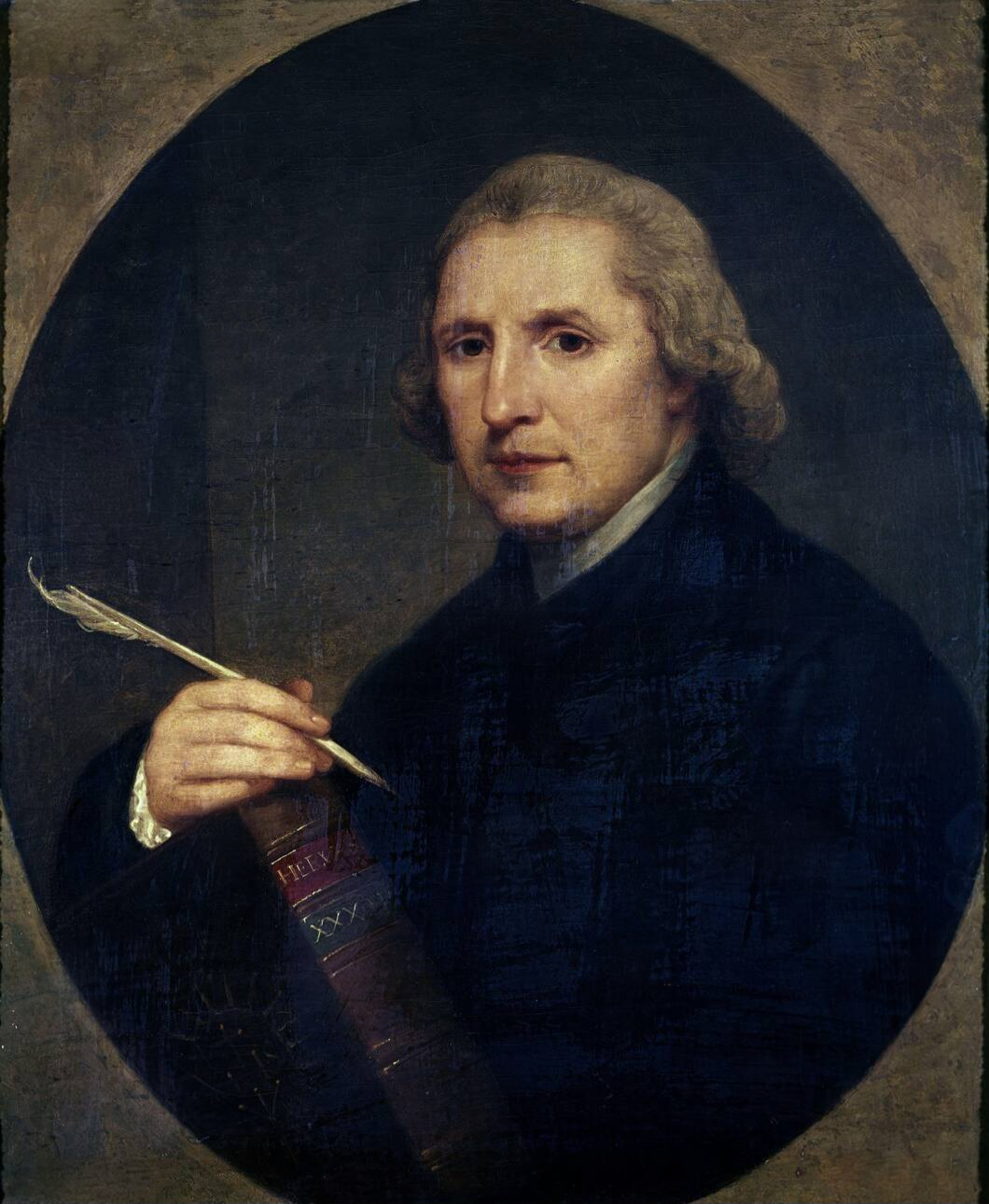
Lorenzo Hervás (1735-1809).

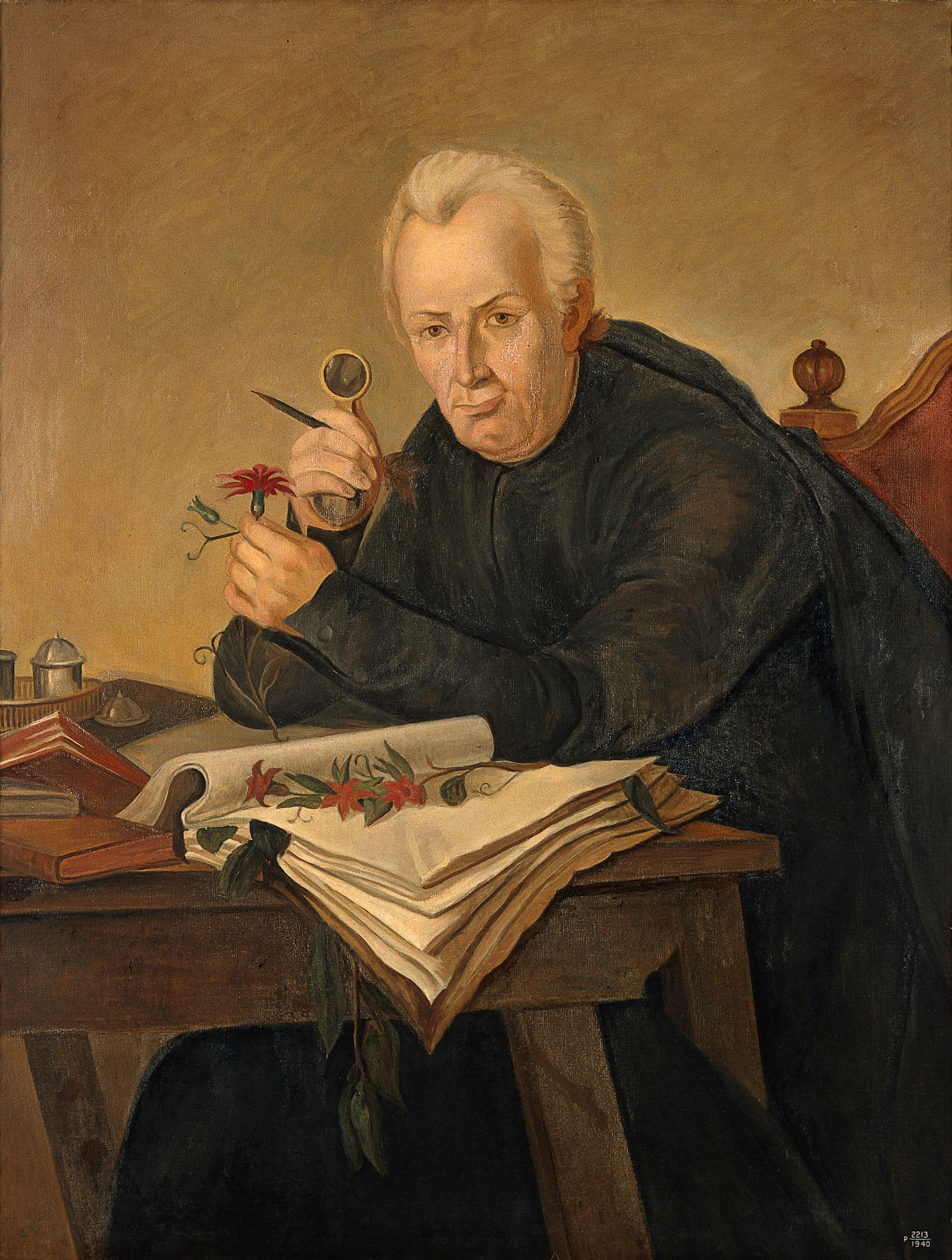
José Celestino Mutis (1732-1808).

The Universalist School proposed the association of modern empiricist epistemology, incorporated into the studies of both bibliography and historiography and of physics and cosmography, with that of a humanistic tradition. From this tradition the comparative method was born. It would be extended to the historic and scientific theory, as well as an extraordinary convergence of humanism and humanitarianism, able at keeping the primacy of the common good and that of education and knowledge based on the study of classical and modern languages.

Whilst Juan Andrés created the Universal History of Arts and Sciences, Lorenzo Hervás concluded the establishment of universal and comparative linguistics. Antonio Eximeno, author of an empiricist and comparative epistemology, will introduce the universal idea of music in a completely innovative way through the concept of "expression". To this broader sense corresponds an exemplary case such as that of the study and reformulation of the language of the deaf-mute or sign language carried out by Juan Andrés and Lorenzo Hervás. A Spanish tradition that had been born with Pedro Ponce de León up in the 16th century was at long last revived.

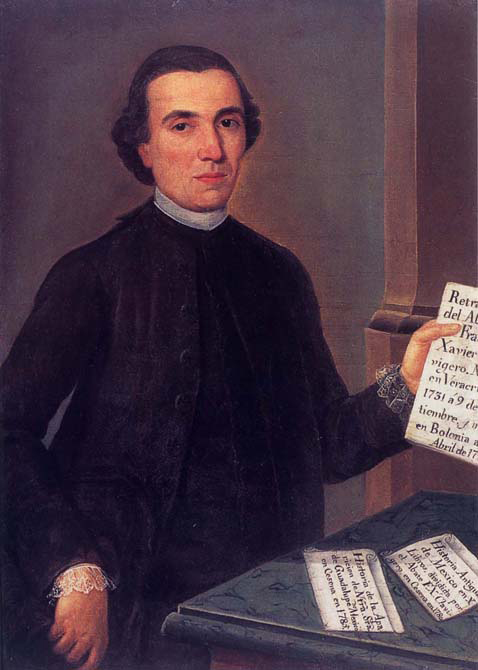
Francisco Javier Clavijero (1731–1787).

The global paradigm of the Universalist School emerged from the Enlightenment, but it is mainly a scientific and historiographical Enlightenment rather than a political one. The fact of the 18th century being a poorly studied century has been a common and accepted situation by the Spanish literary criticism. Nevertheless, the returning criterion to the Foundation of Modern culture represented by the Enlightenment has also been and continues to be a common phenomenon of the contemporary thought. This is certainly correct, since in both historical-political and scientific sense, the Enlightenment establishes or reformulates the main lines of evolution from a good part of modern thought. However, the study of the Enlightenment has paradoxically sometimes been victim of simplification under certain dogmatic guidelines which have already been widely spread and promoted by the Enlightenment, especially in its encyclopaedic field. Such field is known to be overvalued and suffers from ill-conceived socio-political repercussions. It is evident that there are several "Enlightenments" whether they are the Scottish and English empiricism, the French encyclopaedism, the German idealism and the Spanish or Hispanic or Spanish-Italian one with a scientific empiricist base as well as humanistic and epistemologically historical and progressive as an alternative to the Encyclopaedia.

== Commemorations ==
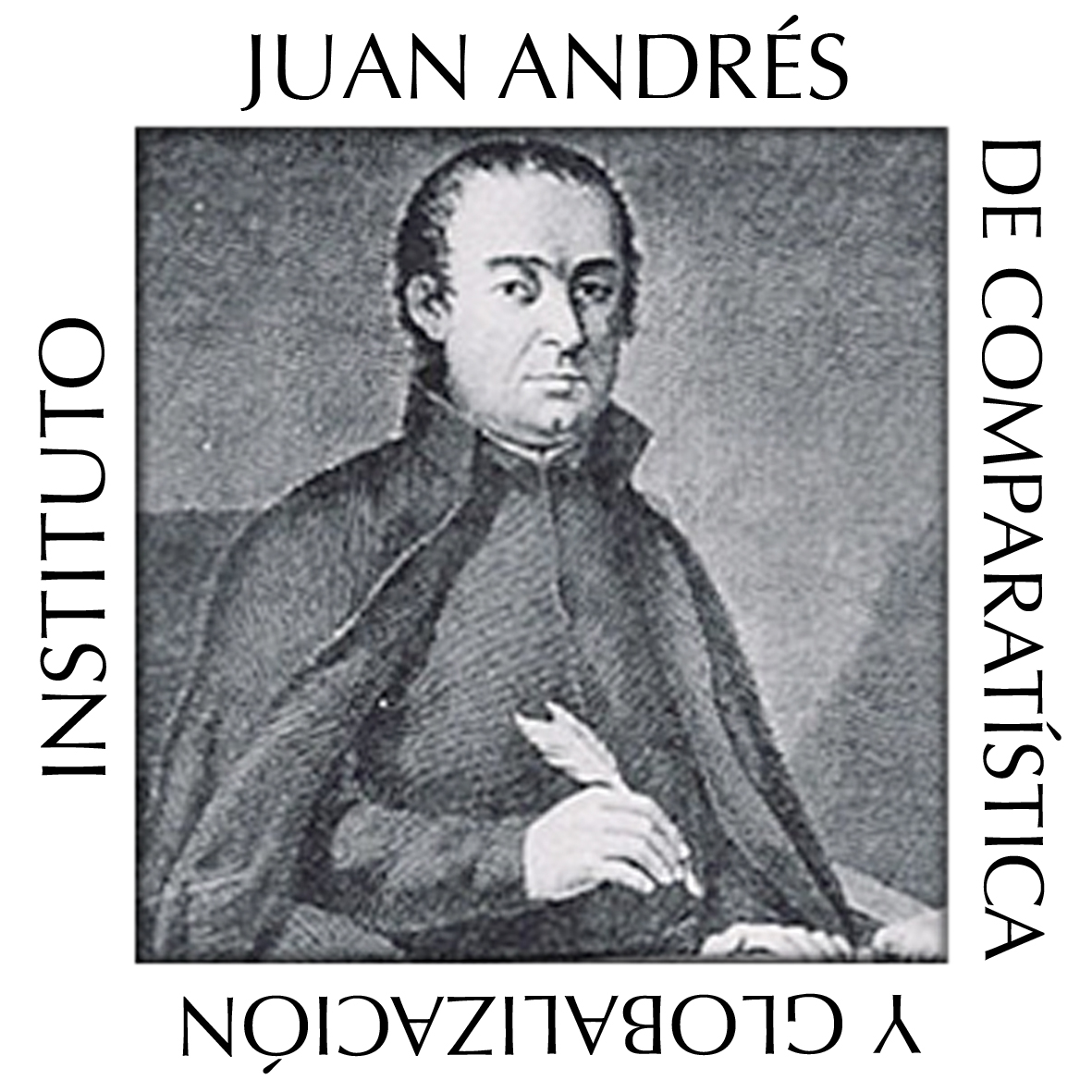
Instituto Juan Andrés de Comparatística y Globalización

In 2017, on the bicentennial anniversary of the death of Juan Andrés (1740-1817), the "Instituto Juan Andrés de Comparatística y Globalización" published an agenda of academic and scientific activities. Firstly, the Spanish Universalist School was the subject of a major bibliographical exhibition in the "Biblioteca Histórica Marqués de Valdecilla" of the Complutense University of Madrid, inaugurated on 18 January 2017 and held in collaboration with the AECID (Agencia Española de Cooperación Internacional para el Desarrollo). The great hall, with its 21 showcases, was presided over by a monumental mural size by Murillo Velarde's beautiful and sober world map, as well as by various portraits of the great authors whose works were brought there for the first time together. It revealed the immeasurable dimension and intellectual power of a scientific and humanistic culture that oddly enough was hardly recognized. This took place on the bicentenary of the death in Rome of Juan Andrés, the creator, well known at his time and later postponed, of the Universal History of Letters and Sciences.

On this commemoration, an unpublished manuscript by Juan Andrés, entitled Furia. Disertación sobre una inscripción romana was released for the first time. Part of the hermeneutic and scientific-literary activity of the ideator of universal and comparative history of literature is synthetically reconstructed. The commemorations of the so-called "Año Juan Andrés" (i.e. various academic activities, the publication of the extensive documentary and bibliographic heritage Juan Andrés and the Spanish Universalist School as well as the awarding of the corresponding VIII "Premio Juan Andrés de Ensayo e Investigación en Ciencias Humanas"), continued in Italy mainly through the congress of the "Accademia Nazionale di Mantova" (December, 2017). It continued at the Congress of the "Biblioteca Nazionale di Napoli" the following year and concluded with the great "Biblioteca Hispánica" of the AECID through an exhibition which was published in February 2018 in book form and with the same title, "La Ilustración Hispánica".

== The fundamental works of universalist ideation ==
- Juan Andrés (1773), Prospectus philosophiae universae. Publicae disputationi propositae in Templo Ferrariensi P. P. Societatis Jesu..., Ferrara, Josepho Rinaldi Typographo, 1773.
- Juan Andrés (1782-1799), Origen, progresos y estado actual de toda la literatura, ed. of J. García Gabaldón, S. Navarro, C. Valcárcel, dir. P. Aullón de Haro, Madrid, Verbum, 1997-2002, 6 vols. (Critical and complete edition).
- Juan Andrés (1786-1800), Cartas familiares (Viaje de Italia), ed. of I. Arbillaga y C. Valcárcel, dir. P. Aullón de Haro, Madrid, Verbum, 2004, 2 vols. (Critical and complete edition).
- Juan Andrés, La Biblioteca Real de Nápoles, ed. of P. Aullón de Haro, F.J. Bran and D. Mombelli, Madrid, Instituto Juan Andrés, 2020.
- Lorenzo Hervás, Idea dell'Universo, Cesena, 1778-1792, 21 vols.
- Lorenzo Hervás (1785, 1800-1805), Catálogo de las lenguas de las naciones conocidas, Madrid, Atlas, 1979, 5 vols. (Ed. facs.).
- Lorenzo Hervás, Escuela Española de Sordomudos [La gramática de la lengua de signos en su contexto interlingüístico y pedagógico], ed. Ángel Herrero, Universidad de Alicante, 2008.
- Antonio Eximeno (1774), Del Origen y reglas de la Música, Madrid, Imprenta Real, 1796, 3 vols. (Critical and complete edition of Alberto Hernández, Madrid, Verbum, 2016).
- Antonio Eximeno (1789), De la Institución de los Estudios Filosóficos y Matemáticos, ed. of F.J. Juez Gálvez, Introd. of P. Aullón de Haro, Madrid, Instituto Juan Andrés, 2023.
- Francisco Javier Clavijero, Historia Antigua de México, México, Porrúa, 1945, 1964, 2014.
- Juan Ignacio Molina, Saggio sulla storia naturale del Chili, Bolonia, S. Tommaso D’Aquino stamperia, 1782 (2 ed. Bolonia, 1810). (Tras. sp.: Ensayo sobre la historia natural de Chile, ed. of R. Jaramillo, Santiago de Chile, Ediciones Maule, 1987). (Tras. fr.: Essai sur l’Histoire naturelle du Chili, tras. and ed. of M. Gruvel, Paris, Chez N. de la Rochelle, 1789). (Tras. ger.: Versuch einer Naturgeschichte von Chili, tras. of J.D. Brandis, Leipzig, 1786).
- José Celestino Mutis, Flora de la Real Expedición Botánica del Nuevo Reino de Granada: 1783-1816, Madrid, Instituto de Cooperación Iberoamericana-Universidad Nacional de Colombia-..., 49 vols.
- Antonio José Cavanilles, Géneros y especies de plantas demostradas en las lecciones públicas del año 1802, Madrid, Imprenta Real, 1803.
