= Carlos Andrés y Morell =

Spanish philosopher, lawyer, politician, and writer

Carlos Andrés y Morell (also known as Carles Andrés i Morell in Valencian) (1753–1820) was a Spanish philosopher, lawyer, politician and writer. He was the deputy for the district of Alcoy in Cortes of Cadiz.

== Biography ==
Born in Planes in 1753 and belonging to the nobility, he was a lawyer for the Royal Councils. Appointed alternate deputy for the province of Valencia, he was elected by the fifty-one corresponding electors, on February 14, 1810 in the City Council, his power being approved by the Cortes on June 12, 1811, by replacing the elected deputy José Lledó, who, although he had been elected on February 2, 1810, could not attend because he was captured by the French. He was sworn in and took office in the session of June 12, 1811.

Conservative in mind, very much in line with Borrull's, he showed a somewhat condescending attitude towards the Bishop of Orense in his confrontation with the Cortes of Cádiz. When the third regulation of the Regency was discussed, he voted along the lines of those who asserted the danger that it would become practically invulnerable and that it would fall into a kind of ministerial despotism. He was part of the commission in charge of examining the proposals and files presented by Deputy Garcés on the Serranía de Ronda, made up of three deputies. He voted in favor of the survival of the tribute called Voto de Santiago. For this reason, he is one of the founders of the Cadiz Constitution of 1812. Writer and translator, he was a member of the Florence Academy. In 1817, he refused the position of Oidor of the Majorca Court that the monarch Fernando VII granted him. He died in 1820.
