= Theophilus of Corte =

Italian Roman Catholic saint

Saint Theophilus of Corte O.F.M.
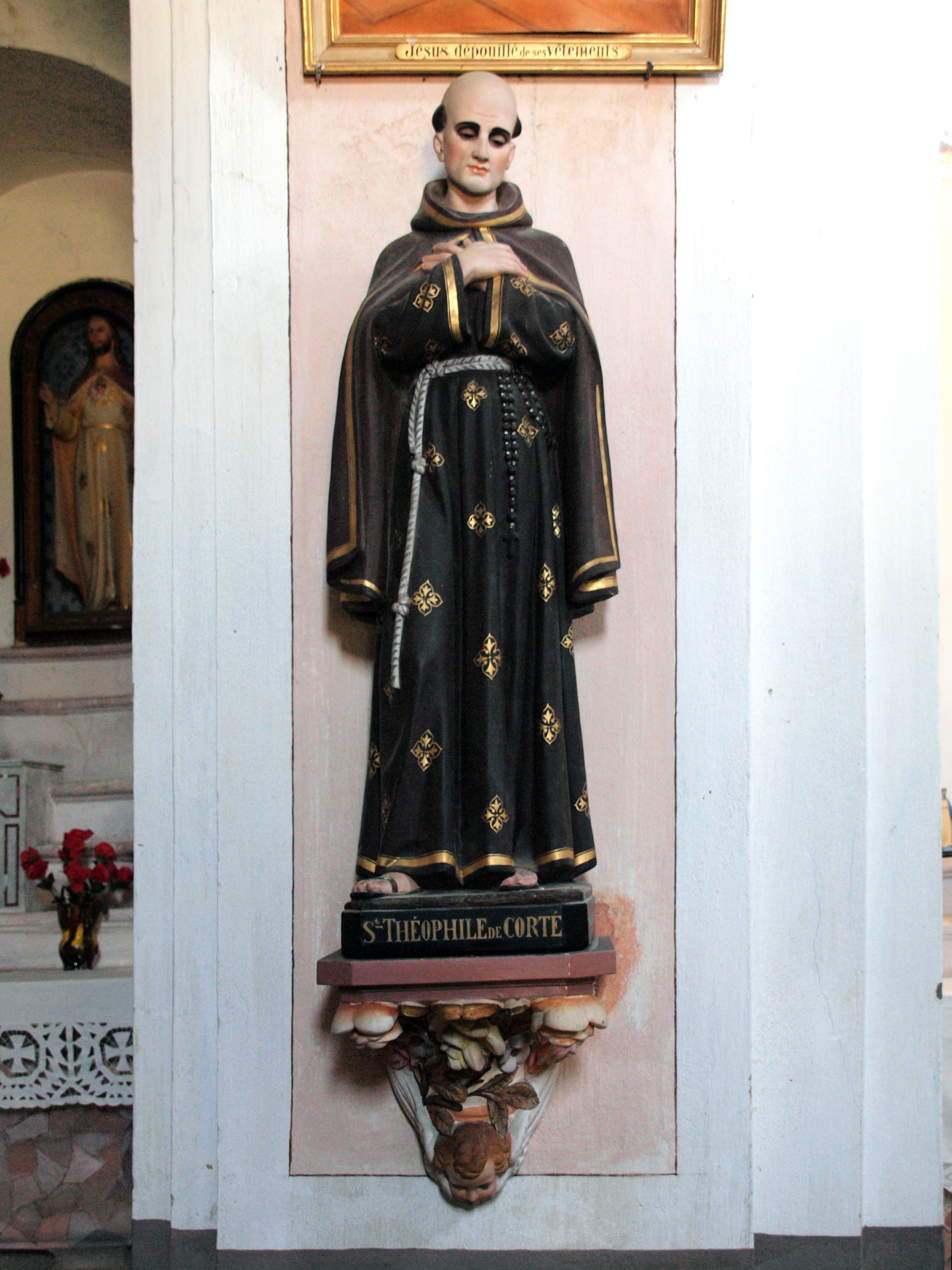

Priest
- Born: 30 October 1676; Corte, Corsica, Republic of Genoa
- Died: 17 June 1740 (aged 63); Corte, Corsica, Republic of Genoa
- Venerated in: Roman Catholic Church
- Beatified: 19 January 1896, Saint Peter's Basilica, Kingdom of Italy by Pope Leo XIII
- Canonized: 29 June 1930, Saint Peter's Basilica, Vatican City by Pope Pius XI
- Feast: 19 May
- Attributes: Franciscan habit

Theophilus of Corte (30 October 1676 – 17 June 1740) - born Biagio Arrighi - was an Italian Roman Catholic priest and a professed member from the Order of Friars Minor. Arrighi became known for his preaching and evangelization efforts and acted as a reformer in establishing houses for the Franciscans in northern Italian cities and throughout the Corsica island where he was born. He was known for his cheerful demeanor and his willingness to assist others while also known for his tireless dedication to silence and solitude which he exhorted his fellow friars to exercise in order to better commune with God.

He was beatified in 1896 and was canonized as a saint on 29 June 1930.

== Life ==
Biagio Arrighi was born on 30 October 1676 in Corsica to the nobles Giovanni Antonio and Maddalena.

He studied under the Franciscans and on 21 September 1693 joined their order and assumed his religious name. He loved silence and solitude and found it a better method of communication with the Lord while exhorting his fellow Franciscans to do the same to reflect on the goodness of God. He completed his theological studies in Rome with distinctions and began his theological studies in Naples. Arrighi made his solemn profession in Salerno in 1694 and was ordained to the priesthood in Naples at the convent of Santa Maria La Nova on 30 November 1700. Once he was ordained he begged his superiors for permission to repair an old convent at Civitella near Subiaco. He founded houses for the order in the Tuscan region and in Corscia in places such as Zuani and Fucecchio. He was a reformer who become known for his preaching and evangelization efforts and for his cheerful disposition.

Arrighi first met Tommaso da Cori in 1702 in Bellegra and would live with him for the next decade until 1709 when he was stationed in Palombra until 1715. He served as the guardian of that convent from 1713 to 1715 before he would return to Bellegra. He was in Rome from 1734 until 1735 when he was moved to Bellegra once more.

Arrighi died on 17 June 1740.

== Sainthood ==
The cause for his canonization opened after his death in 1750 and Pope Benedict XIV named him as Venerable on 21 November 1755. The cause culminated on 19 January 1896 after Pope Leo XIII beatified him while Pope Pius XI later proclaimed him to be a saint on 29 June 1930.
