= José Celestino Mutis =

Spanish mathematician and botanist (1732–1808)

Jose Celestino Mutis
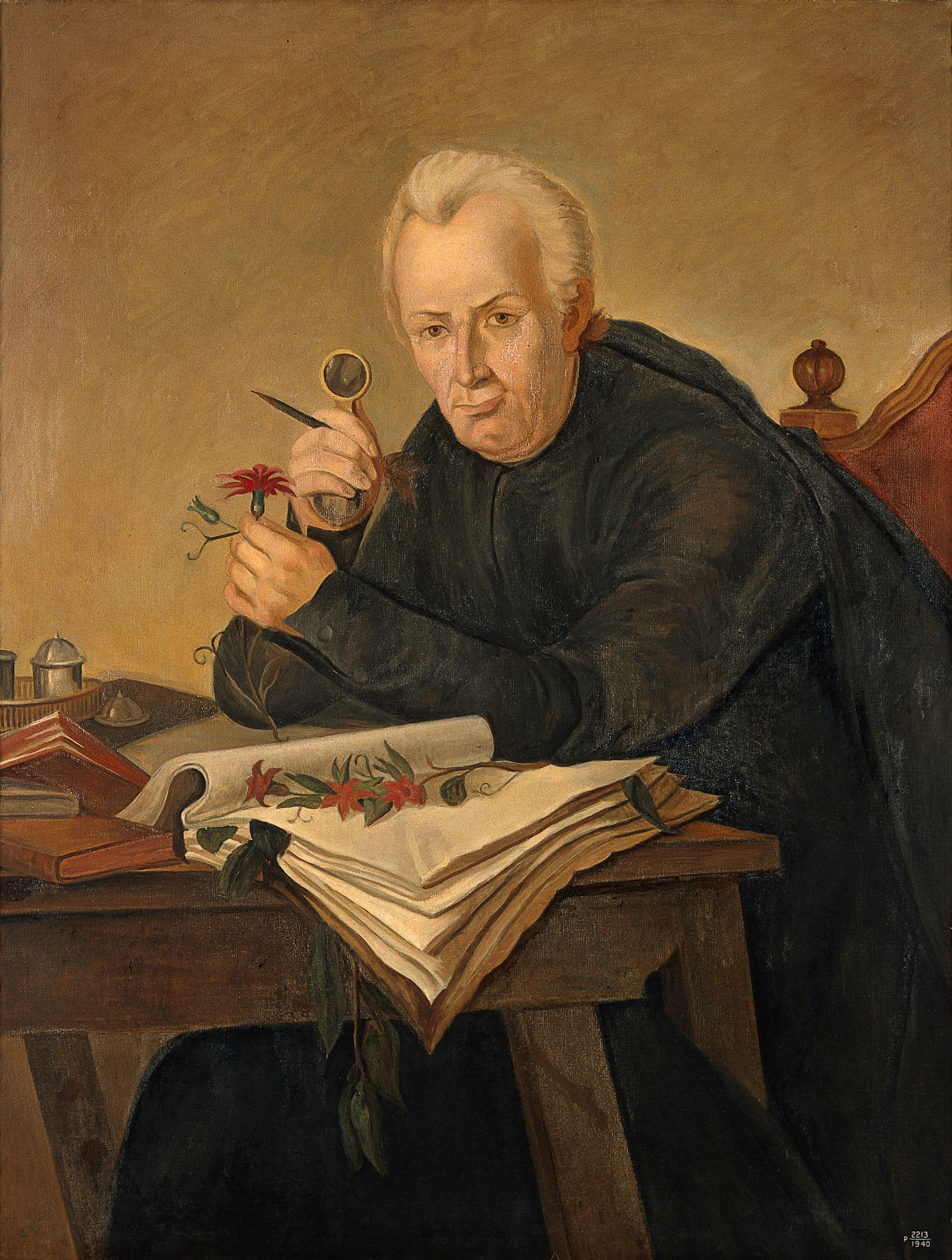
- Mutis by R. Cristobal, 1930
- Born: 6 April 1732; Cádiz, Andalusia
- Died: 11 September 1808 (aged 76); Bogotá
- Education: University of Seville
- Scientific career
- Fields: Botanist, mathematician, priest, artist

José Celestino Bruno Mutis y Bosio (6 April 1732 – 11 September 1808) was a Spanish priest, botanist and mathematician. He was a significant figure in the Spanish American Enlightenment, whom Alexander von Humboldt met on his expedition to Spanish America. He is one of the most important authors of the Spanish Universalist School of the 18th century, together with Juan Andrés or Antonio Eximeno.

== Life ==
He was born in Cádiz and baptized with the name José Celestino Bruno Mutis y Bosio. He began his medical studies at the College of Surgery in Cádiz, where he also studied physics, chemistry and botany. He graduated in medicine from the University of Seville on 2 May 1755.

On 5 July 1757 he received his doctorate in medicine. From 1757 to 1760 he was interim professor of anatomy in Madrid. During those same years he continued to study botany at the Migas Calientes Botanical Gardens (now the Real Jardín Botánico de Madrid), and also astronomy and mathematics.

After three years he decided to leave for America, as the private physician of the new viceroy of New Granada, Pedro Messía de la Cerda. He sailed on 7 September 1760, arriving at Santa Fe de Bogotá on 24 February 1761. During the long transatlantic passage he began writing his Diario de Observaciones, which he continued until 1791.

From his arrival in the Viceroyalty, Mutis concentrated on his botanical studies, beginning work on an herbal and investigating for cinchona, which was considered a panacea for the treatment of all kinds of diseases. He wrote El Arcano de la Quina.

== Botanical expedition ==
Beginning in 1763, Mutis proposed to the king that he sponsor an expedition to study the flora and fauna of the region. He had to wait 20 years for the authorization, but in 1783 the king authorized his expedition (one of three royal botanical expeditions to the New World at about that time). In the interim, Mutis concentrated on commercial and mineralogical projects, not neglecting medicine. He also studied the social and economic conditions of the viceroyalty, and continued to expand his collection of flora and fauna. On 19 December 1772 he was ordained a priest. He was in regular correspondence with scientists in Spain and elsewhere in Europe, particularly Carl Linnaeus.

Mutis led the Royal Botanical Expedition, established in 1783, for 25 years. It explored some 8,000 km^{2} in a range of climates, using the Río Magdalena for access to the interior. He developed a meticulous methodology that included the harvesting of the samples in the field together with detailed descriptions, including data on the surroundings of each species and its utility. Hundreds of plants were discovered and described. More than 8,000 plates, plus maps, correspondence, notes and manuscripts were sent to Spain. His museum consisted of 24,000 dried plants, 5,000 drawings of plants by his pupils, and a collection of woods, shells, resins, minerals, and skins. These treasures arrived safely at Madrid in 105 boxes, and the plants, manuscripts, and drawings were sent to the botanical gardens, where they were relegated to a tool-house.

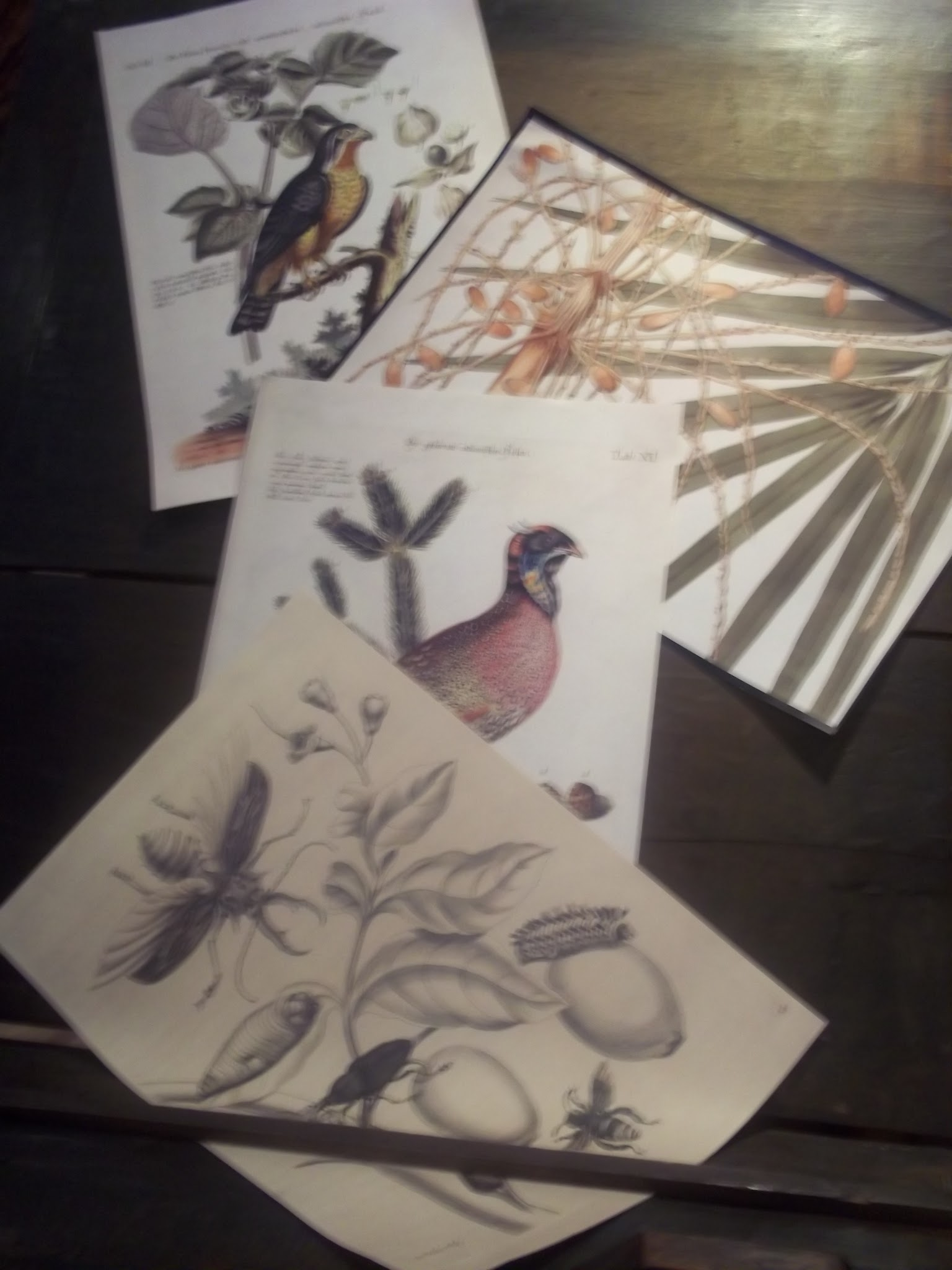
Illustrations from Mutis's work

The Royal Botanical Expedition headquarters moved in two different occasions. Initially it was based on the municipality of La Mesa (now in the Department of Cundinamarca), then in November 1783 it was moved to Mariquita (Department of Tolima). Finally in 1791 it was moved to Santa Fe de Bogota.

Much of the work was wasted because the results remained unedited and unanalyzed. Also, the collation between the notes and the plates was lost during the transfer to Spain. His work on the species and varieties of Chinchona had lasting influence.

He determined the longitude of Bogotá by the observation of an eclipse of a satellite of Jupiter and was a major influence on the construction of the National Astronomical Observatory.

In March 1762, at the inauguration of the chair of mathematics at the Colegio del Rosario, he expounded the principles of the Copernican system and of the experimental method of science, leading to a confrontation with the Church. In 1774 he had to defend the teaching of the principles of Copernicus, as well as natural philosophy and modern, Newtonian physics and mathematics, before the Inquisition.

In 1784, he was elected a foreign member of the RSAOS Royal Swedish Academy of Sciences.

Alexander von Humboldt visited Mutis in 1801, during his expedition to America. Humboldt stayed with Mutis for two months, and greatly admired his botanical collection.

Mutis died in Bogotá on 2 September 1808, at age 76, a victim of apoplexy. Because much of his botanical work was lost or unpublished, he is known to history not as a great scientist, but as a great promoter of science and knowledge.

== Fields ==
- Botany: He studied the flora of his surroundings, and produced a marvelous collection of plates of Colombian plants that are now located in the Royal Botanical Garden in Madrid.
- Linguistics: He studied the indigenous languages of the area. By order of King Charles III, he developed a series of elementary vocabularies of various languages (about 100 words in each language). King Charles was responding to a request from Czarina Catherine the Great to provide vocabularies of all the languages spoken in his realms, in order to develop a monumental dictionary of all the languages of the world. The dictionary was in fact published, but the compilers published it in alphabetical order, making it nearly impossible to consult.
- Other sciences, including important contributions to industrial processes, such as silver mining and the distillation of rum.

== Works ==
- Diario de observaciones de José Celestino Mutis, 1760-1790, 2 vols. 2nd edition. Bogotá: Instituto Colombiano de Cultura Hispánica 1983.
- Escritos botánicos. María Paz Martín Fierro, ed. Editoriales Andaluzas Unidas 1985.
- Escritos científicos de José Celestino Mutis. Guillermo Hernández de Alba. 2nd ed. 2 vols. Bogotá: Instituto Colombiano de Cultura Hispánica 1983.
- Flora de la Real Expedición Botánica del Nuevo Reino de Granada. Madrid: Ediciones de Cultura Hispánica 1954.
- Viaje a Santa Fe. Marcelo Frías Núñez, ed. Madrid: Historia 16 (1991).

== Legacy ==
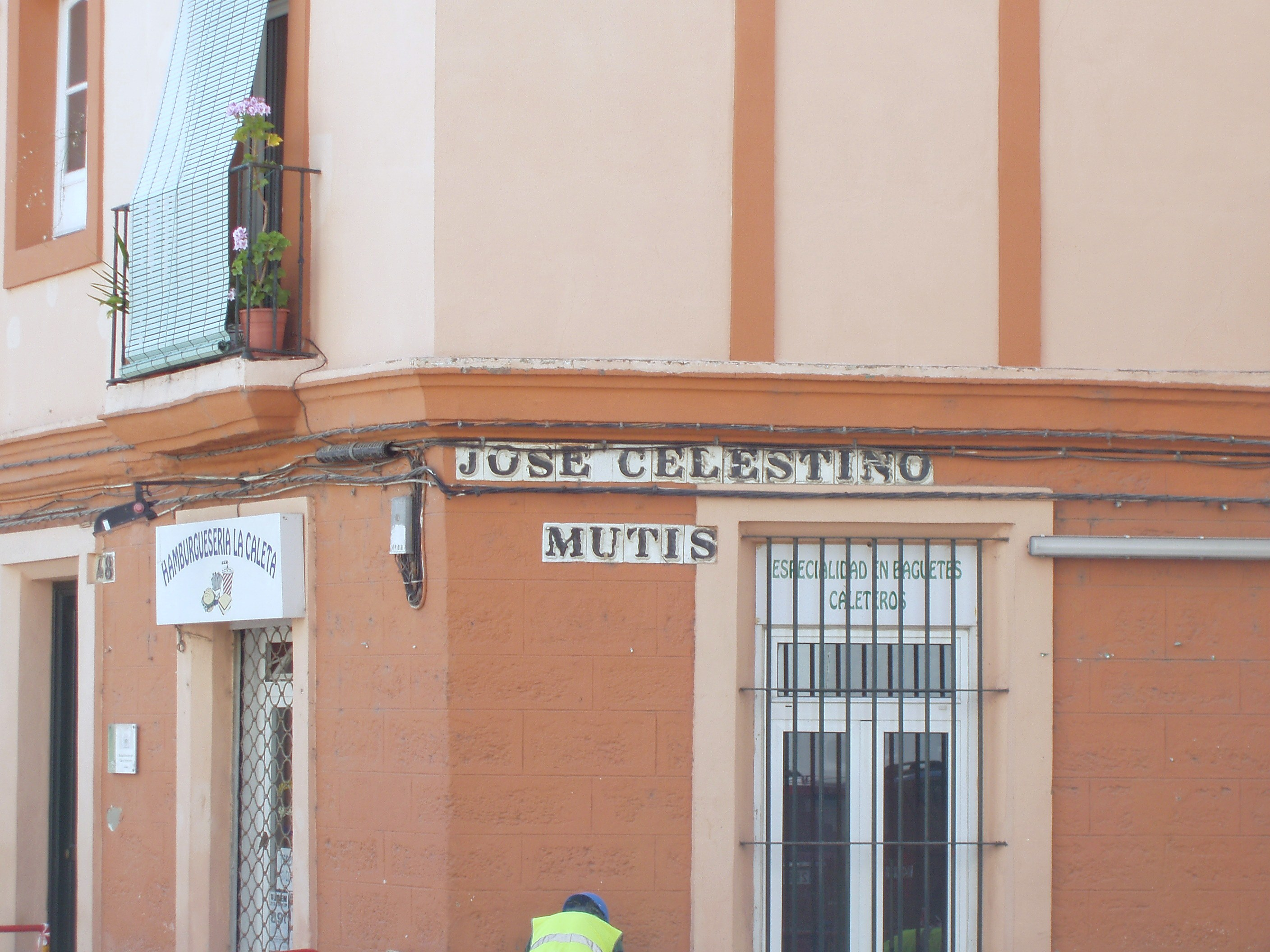
Street named after Celestino Mutis, in Cádiz, Spain

José Celestino Mutis on a 1996 2000 Pesetas specimen banknote

His likeness is well known to Spaniards, because his image was used on the 1992-2002 banknotes of 2,000 Pesetas. This was the first in a series of banknotes commemorating Spain in America. On the reverse was a drawing of the Mutisia clematis flower, named in his honor. He was also depicted in the 200 Colombian Pesos banknote between 1983 and 1992.

José Celestino Mutis Botanical Gardens, a park and center of scientific investigation, is named in his honor in Bogotá. It includes climate-controlled exhibits of the flora in all climate zones of Colombia. There is also an exhibit of 5,000 Colombian orchids, one of Colombia's most extensive.

The official name of the town of Bahía Solano on Colombia's Pacific coast in the Department of Chocó is Puerto Mutis, in honor of José Celestino Mutis. The airport there is Aeropuerto José Celestino Mutis, as well. This town is located north of the city of Buenaventura and north of the San Juan River, the largest river in South America to empty into the Pacific Ocean.

In 1783, he hired Vicente Albán to commit paintings associated with the flora of Ecuador.

His collection of plant specimens deposited in Paris at the National Museum of Natural History, France was curated by Alicia Lourteig.

== Other expeditions ==
The four expeditions authorized by King Charles III to the Spanish colonies were those of Hipólito Ruiz López and José Antonio Pavón to Peru and Chile (1777–1788); Mutis to New Granada (1783–1808); Juan de Cuéllar to the Philippines (1786–1797); and Martín Sessé y Lacasta to New Spain (1787–1803).

== See also ==
- Spanish Universalist School of the 18th century
- List of Roman Catholic scientist-clerics
- Spanish American Enlightenment
