= Planes, Spain =

Planes
- Municipality
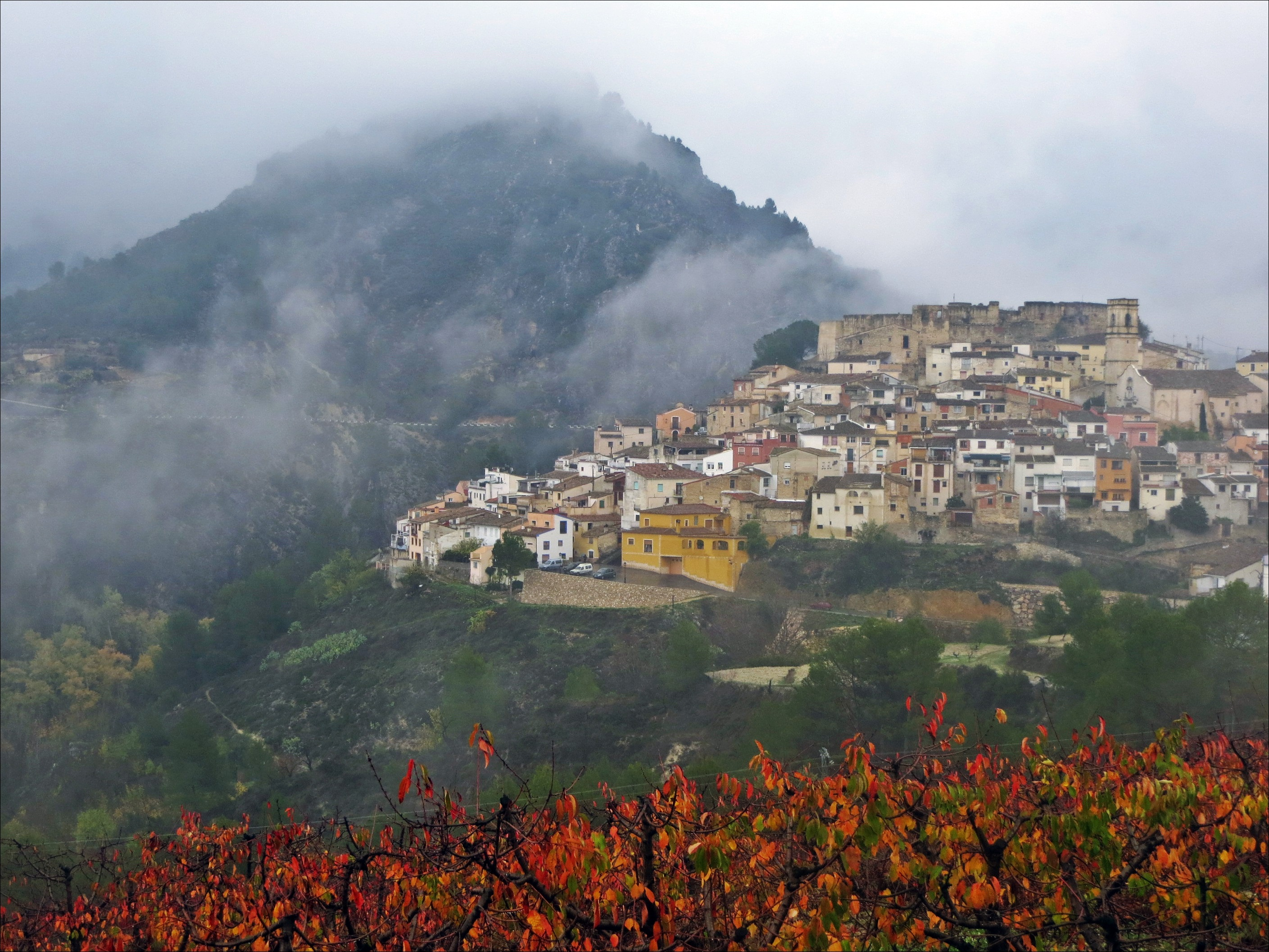

- Flag Coat of arms

- Location within Spain Location within Valencian Community Location within Europe
- Coordinates: 38°47′07″N 0°20′42″W
- Country: Spain
- Autonomous Community: Valencian Community
- Province: Alicante
- Comarca: Comtat

Government
  - Type: Mayor-council government
  - Body: Ajuntament de Planes
  - Mayor: Francisco Javier Sendra Mengual (2015)

Area
  - Total: 38.9 km^{2} (15.0 sq mi)
- Elevation: 472 m (1,549 ft)

Population (2025-01-01)
  - Total: 697
  - Density: 17.9/km^{2} (46.4/sq mi)
- Demonym(s): Planero, -ra (es) planer, ra (va)
- Time zone: CET (GMT +1)
  - Summer (DST): CEST (GMT +2)
- Postcode: 03828
- Website: City Hall of Planes

Planes (Valencian and Spanish: [ˈplanes]) is a municipality in Spain. This hamlet lies in the Comtat region of the Valencian Community, Spain.

== Notable people ==
- Carlos Andrés y Morell (1753–1820) Spanish philosopher, lawyer, politician and writer
