= Asco, Haute-Corse =

Asco
- Commune
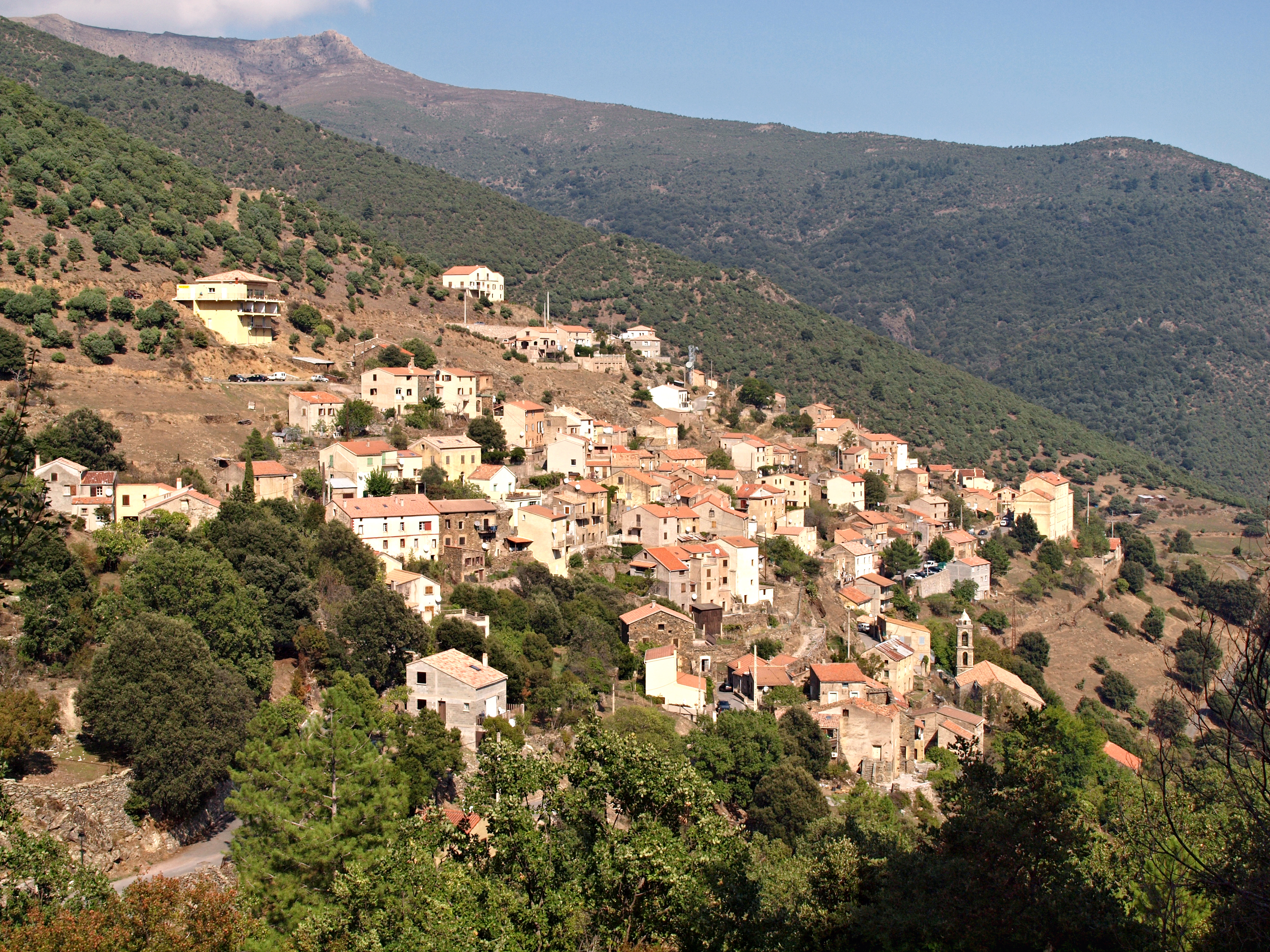
- A general view of Asco
- Location of Asco
- Location within France Location within Corsica
- Coordinates: 42°27′16″N 9°01′59″E
- Country: France
- Region: Corsica
- Department: Haute-Corse
- Arrondissement: Corte
- Canton: Golo-Morosaglia
- Intercommunality: Pasquale Paoli

Government
  - Mayor (2020–2026): Bernard Franceschetti
- Area^{1}: 122.81 km^{2} (47.42 sq mi)
- Elevation: 620 m (2,030 ft)
- Highest elevation: 2,706 m (8,878 ft)
- Lowest elevation: 383 m (1,257 ft)
- Population (2023): 116
  - Density: 0.945/km^{2} (2.45/sq mi)
- Time zone: UTC+01:00 (CET)
  - Summer (DST): UTC+02:00 (CEST)
- INSEE/Postal code: 2B023 /20276
- ^{1} French Land Register data, which excludes lakes, ponds, glaciers > 1 km^{2} (0.386 sq mi or 247 acres) and river estuaries.

Asco (French pronunciation: [asko]; Corsican: Ascu, pronounced [ˈaːs.ku]) is a commune in the Haute-Corse department of France on the island of Corsica.

The inhabitants of the commune are known as Aschesi.

== Geography ==
Asco is a remote commune high in the mountains some 20 km in a direct line south-east of Calvi and 15 km north-west of Corte. It is a commune which was part of the former Pieve of Caccia: a historic territory, geographically and culturally, which was made up of Niolo, Giovellina, and the Asco Valley which today is called the High Centre of Corsica. The commune is part of the ten communes in the Canton of Castifao-Morosaglia. It is also located in the Parc naturel régional de Corse (Regional Natural Park of Corsica).

=== Access to the commune ===
The main access to Asco is by the D47 (branches from the N197 at a place called Ponte Rossu 1.5 km north of Ponte-Leccia). The D47 is the road to the villages of Moltifao and Castifao however to get to Asco and the upper valley, the D147 branches from the D47 at the Capanacce junction south of Moltifao. From this junction, it is about 12 km to the remote village, crossing the gorges of Asco. The road continues beyond the village and, after passing through the Asco communal forest, it ends in a cul-de-sac at the former ski resort of Haut-Asco, a remote place 14 km south-west of Asco.

To improve traffic circulation, the D147 follows a route around the village. The former road through the village is named D147a and is a way reserved for residents. There is no public road transport of passengers or goods. The Railways of Corsica line passes through Ponte-Leccia where there is a station.

The nearest airport is the Bastia – Poretta Airport near Bastia and the nearest commercial seaport is that of Bastia.

=== Relief ===
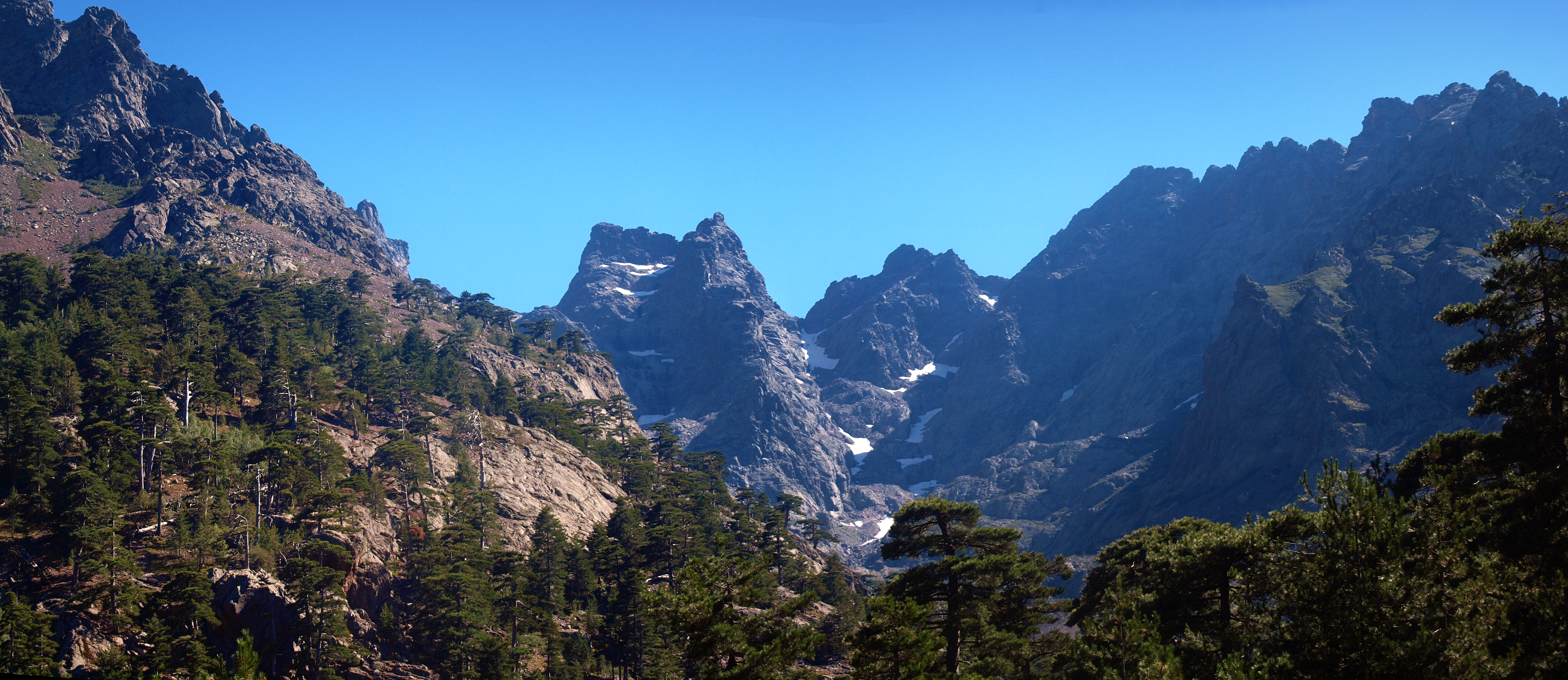
The Cirque Trimbolacciu and Capu Larghia

Asco is, with Moltifao and Castifao, one of the three communes in the Asco valley. Asco occupies the upper part of the valley which takes its name from the river Asco. The river's Drainage basin is Haut-Asco which is formed by a chain of high mountains including some of the highest peaks on the island: Capu Biancu (2,582 m), Capu a u Verdatu (2,583 m), Punta Selolla (2,592 m), Capu Ciuntrone (2,666 m), Monte Cinto (2,706 m) on the western side where the source of the river is, Pointe des Éboulis (2,607 m), Punta Crucetta (2,499 m), Capu Larghia (2,503 m), Punta Minuta (2,556 m), Capu di a Muvraghia (2,582 m), and Punta Missoghiu (2,201 m). The river flows through the commune to its confluence with the Ruisseau de Cabanne where there is a bridge. Another footbridge was located at the beginning of the Asco gorges but was destroyed by a recent flood.

=== Hydrography ===
The main river is the Asco, a tributary of the Golo, which has its source from under the Punta Rossa (or Pic Von Cube) (2,247 m) in the commune as the Ruisseau de Tighiettu and, further downstream, it becomes the Ruisseau de Stranciacone. It leaves the communal territory at the walkway located at the confluence of the Ruisseau de Cabanne in the place called "Gorges of Asco". This walkway is 383 m above sea level and provides access to the existing adventure park for tree climbing, Via ferrata, etc. The Asco has many tributaries: thirteen are listed on the SANDRE website.

A power plant was built upstream of the Asco Genoese bridge.

Less than 400 m in a direct line north-west of Monte Cinto is the Lac d'Argentu (Argentu Lake) (2300 m).

=== Climate and vegetation ===
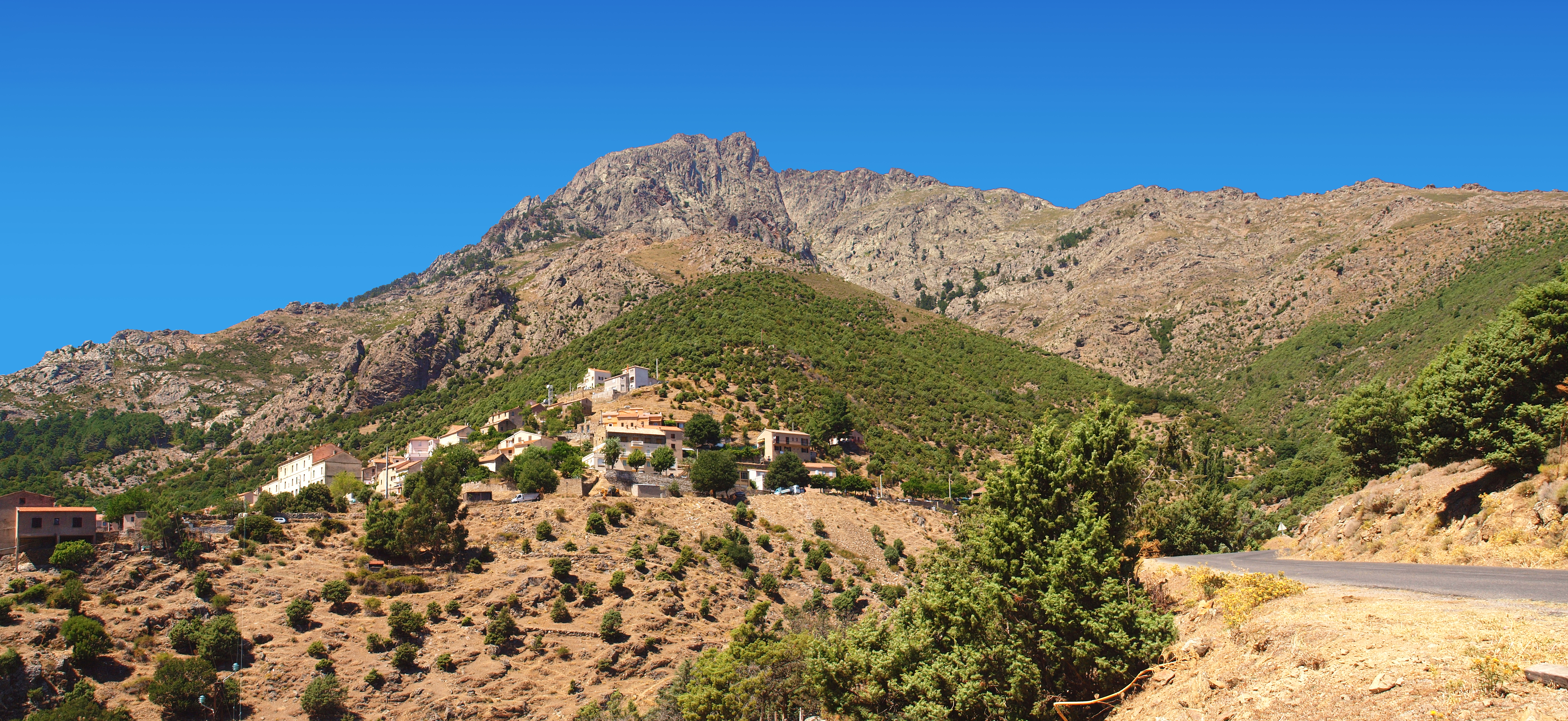
Panorama of the village at the foot of the escarpment of Monte Padro

Asco offers varied landscapes of bare rocky mountains in the Gorges of Asco, almost impenetrable scrub above the gorges, and dry and arid with a forest of prickly juniper in the vicinity of the village, and thick forests of black pine above the village. Below the ridge lines thick and aromatic Alder bushes grow called u bassu in Corsican: an endemic shrub without a trunk. The Asco communal forest that covers the upper valley includes the Forest of Vecchietto and the Forest of Carrozzica, which are larger and higher; both on the Asco slopes. These landscapes are similar to high alpine valleys. The presence of a ski resort (now closed) reinforces this illusion.

== Town planning ==
=== Asco village ===
Asco people live at an average altitude in the village of 600 metres. The village dates from the 11th century. Many older homes have been renovated and are enclosed in the lower part of the village where the parish church of St. Michael the Archangel with its typical bell tower and the War memorial are located.

Asco was an enclave until the middle of the 20th century and the first road was opened in 1937. The road leading to the gorges was opened in 1968. The old road providing access to Haut-Asco became the D147a - the main street where access is restricted to residents.

=== Haut-Asco ===
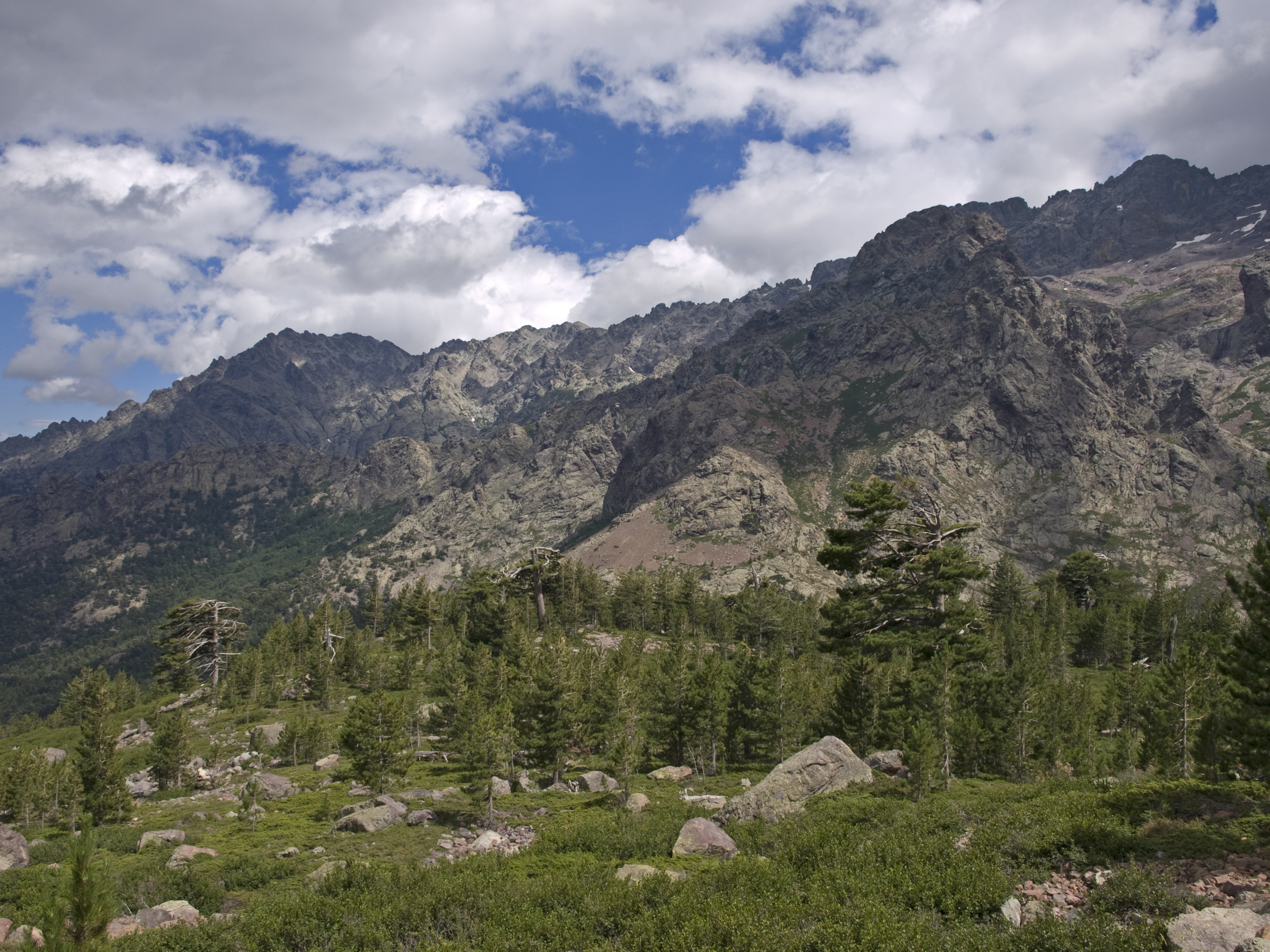
Mountains in Haut-Asco

Haut-Asco is located on the Stagno plateau at 1,422 m altitude. It is served by the D147 road which ends there in a cul-de-sac. The whole road from the junction is narrow, steep, and winding and is prohibited for access by buses over 11 m long.

Until the end of the 20th century Haut-Asco was still quite popular for its winter ski resort that opened its snowy slopes for short periods. To this end, several permanent chalets were built by individuals on the alignment of the old ski-lift. Since then the ski resort has been dismantled. Haut-Asco attracts many visitors during the summer season: hikers for the PNRC Ascu Stagnu refuge with its cottage and tourists for its attractive and pleasant site. A few shops open during the season (bar-hotel-restaurant).

The ski area re-opened for the 2015/2016 winter season with 1 drag lift and 1 magic carpet. There are proposals to build a fixed 4 seater chairlift and a further drag lift for the 2016/2017 season.

== History ==
=== Middle Ages ===
Asco was part of Cachia, a Pieve of about 3,500 inhabitants (including Pietralba). Around 1520 the populated areas were La Petrella, Castifao, La Roma, La Paganosa, Le Piazze, Moltifao, Cheta, Merezoli, Campolato, lo Borgo, Sevola, Asco, Canavaggia, and La Costa.

The commune has long been landlocked and its population lived in autarky. The only existing roads were those since the Middle Ages; rivers were crossed on Genoese bridges called "génois". Cut off from the outside world, people organized themselves into a community with rules of life unique in Corsica. They already elected democratically a wise man responsible for ensuring compliance with the rules of solidarity and equality.

=== Modern times ===
- 1768 - The island came under French military administration. the Pieve of Caccia retained its name.
- 1789 - Corsica belonged to the Kingdom of France. Asco was within the royal jurisdiction of Corte. When the French Revolution came the royal courts were removed. The National Constituent Assembly divided France into 83 departments.
- 1790 - The department of Corse was created with Bastia as the prefecture. The island was divided into nine districts (former jurisdictions). Each district was divided into cantons (former Pieves) and the cantons into communes. The former communities or parishes were called communes.
- 1791 - Corte became the capital of the department; the seat of the diocese was changed to Ajaccio.
- 1793 - Year II. The National Convention, by Decree of 1 July 1793, divided the island into two departments: El Golo (now Haute-Corse) and Liamone (now Corse-du-Sud) were created. Asco was in the canton of Caccia in the district of Calvi and the department of El Golo.
- 1801 - Under the French Consulate (Note: The Act of 28 Pluviôse VIII (19 February 1800) focused on local government. It preserved the departments inherited from the Revolution but redrew the internal divisions. Districts became arrondissements, the commune was defined and the canton created. At each level there was an appointed public official and an elected Consultative Assembly) and the Bulletin des Lois the commune of Asco passed to the Arrondissement of Corte in the department of Golo.
- 1811 - The departments of Golo and Liamone were merged to form the department of Corse.
- 1828 - The Canton of Caccia became the Canton of Castifao.

=== Contemporary era ===
- 1937 - The first road was built to open up Asco and the upper valley. The route through the gorges of Asco was opened in 1968.
- 1954 - Asco was made part of the Canton of Castifao which is made up of the communes of Asco, Castifao, and Moltifao.
- 1973 - The Canton of Castifao-Morosaglia (Capital: Morosaglia) is created with the merger of the former cantons of Castifao and Morosaglia.
- 1975 - The island is divided into two departments again: Haute-Corse and Corse-du-Sud. Asco is in Haute-Corse.

== Administration ==
List of Successive Mayors

From	To	Name
2001	2014	François Franceschetti
2014	2026	Bernard Franceschetti

== Demography ==
Historical population

Year	Pop.	±% p.a.
1800	673	—
1821	575	−0.75%
1846	817	+1.41%
1872	847	+0.14%
1891	1,044	+1.11%
1901	817	−2.42%
1911	732	−1.09%
1921	712	−0.28%
1936	626	−0.85%
1946	467	−2.89%
1954	427	−1.11%

Year	Pop.	±% p.a.
1962	215	−8.22%
1968	205	−0.79%
1975	171	−2.56%
1982	116	−5.39%
1990	96	−2.34%
1999	134	+3.77%
2007	131	−0.28%
2012	118	−2.07%
2017	119	+0.17%
2023	116	−0.42%

Source: EHESS and INSEE

== Economy ==
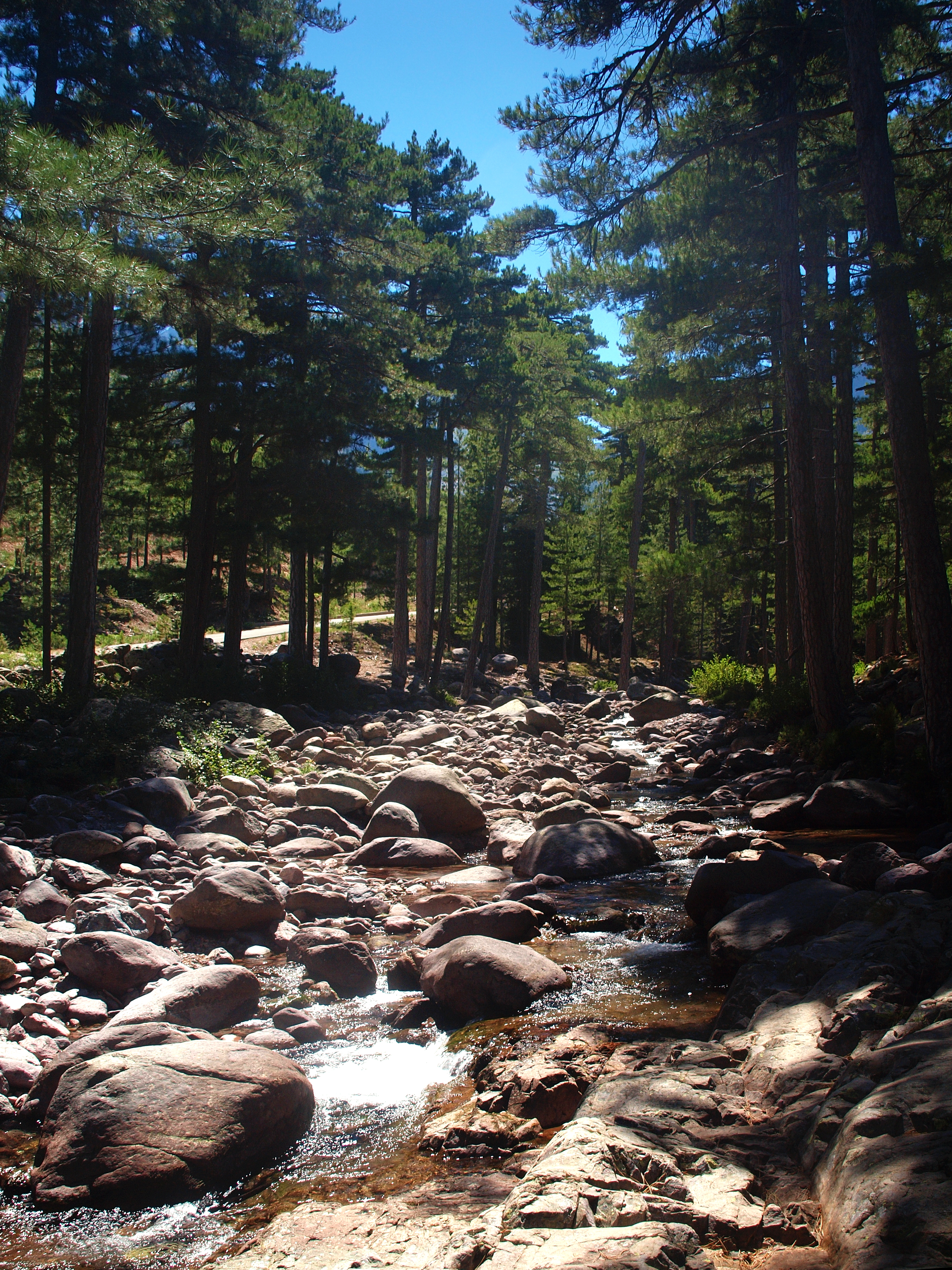
Ruisseau de Stranciacone

The Asco valley is known for its traditional production of very characteristic knives with the tail of the handle representing a stylized head of a dog. Today unfortunately there is no manufacturer of knives in the valley but some famous Corsican knife makers continue to live by the tradition. Asco also produced in furnaces pitch for sealing wooden boats at the time. The pitch was harvested locally from the trunks of the black pine. This pitch is no longer produced today. Other than pastoralism: honey, cheeses, and Charcuterie are sources of income for some people.

Despite the closure of the Asco ski resort at the end of the 20th century, eco-tourism is growing with renewed mountain visits for holidaymakers. A municipal camping ground ("Monte Cintu") has existed for many years in the Forest of Carrozzica along the Ruisseau de Stranciacone. Amid the gorges of Asco an adventure park called "In Terra Corsa" is open for tree climbing, Via ferrata, etc. Hotels and restaurants open in summer to receive, accommodate, and feed the visitors.

== Sites and monuments ==
=== Civil heritage ===
==== Genovese bridge of Asco ====
The Genovese bridge dates to the 15th century when Corsica was occupied by the Republic of Genoa. It is located at Lamella at an altitude of 535 m below the village.

The bridge is accessible from the D441 road via a tortuous road one kilometre long which terminates at the bridge. The D441 branches from the D147 at the exit to the village towards Asco-Stagnu (14 km distant). It is found on the old lane that linked the valley to Niolo.

Under the bridge the Asco has created a large natural pool which is very popular with locals and tourists in the summer. In mid-June 2010 a water temperature was measured of 13.7 °C when testing the quality of the water.

Pictures of the Genovese bridge

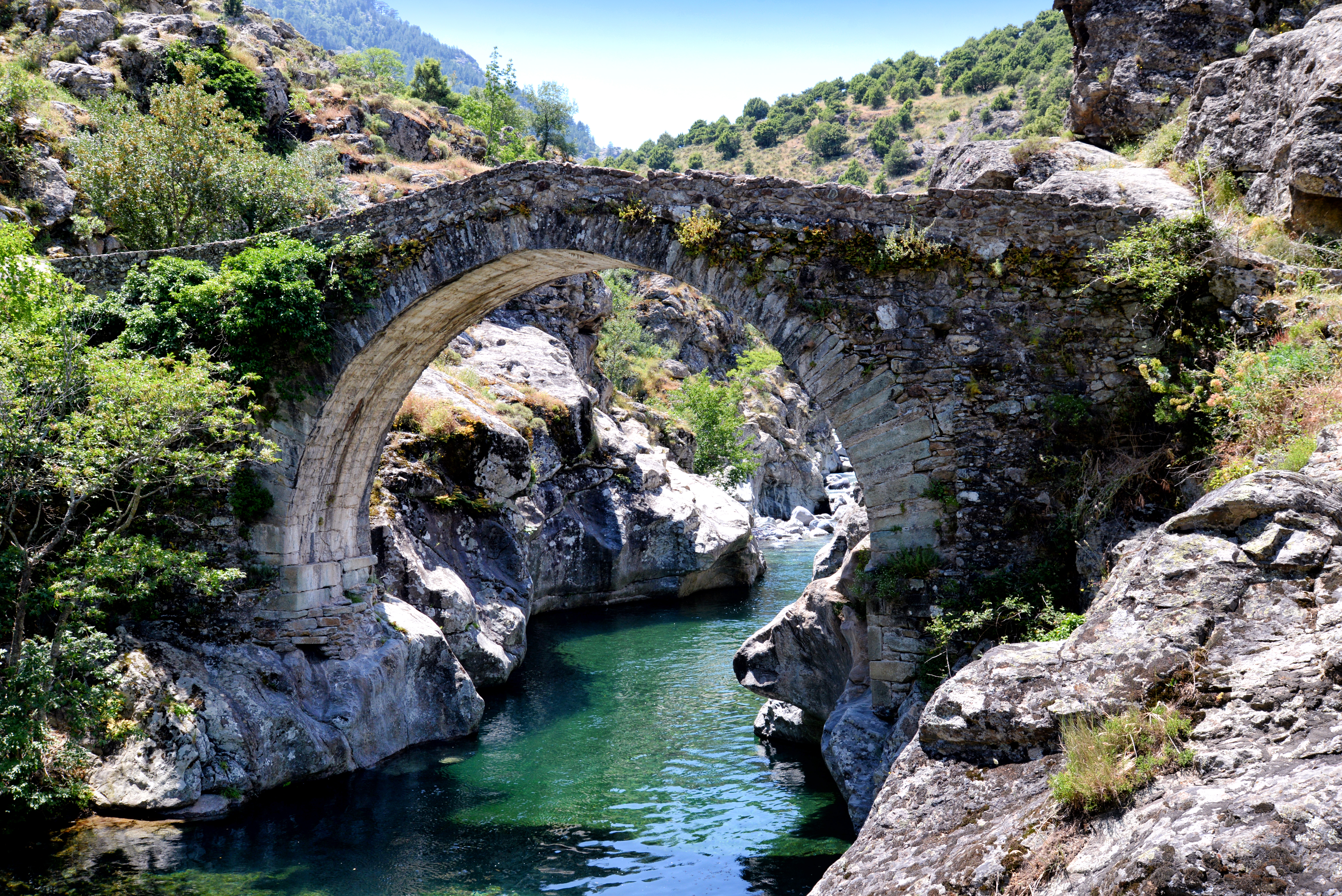
View from below

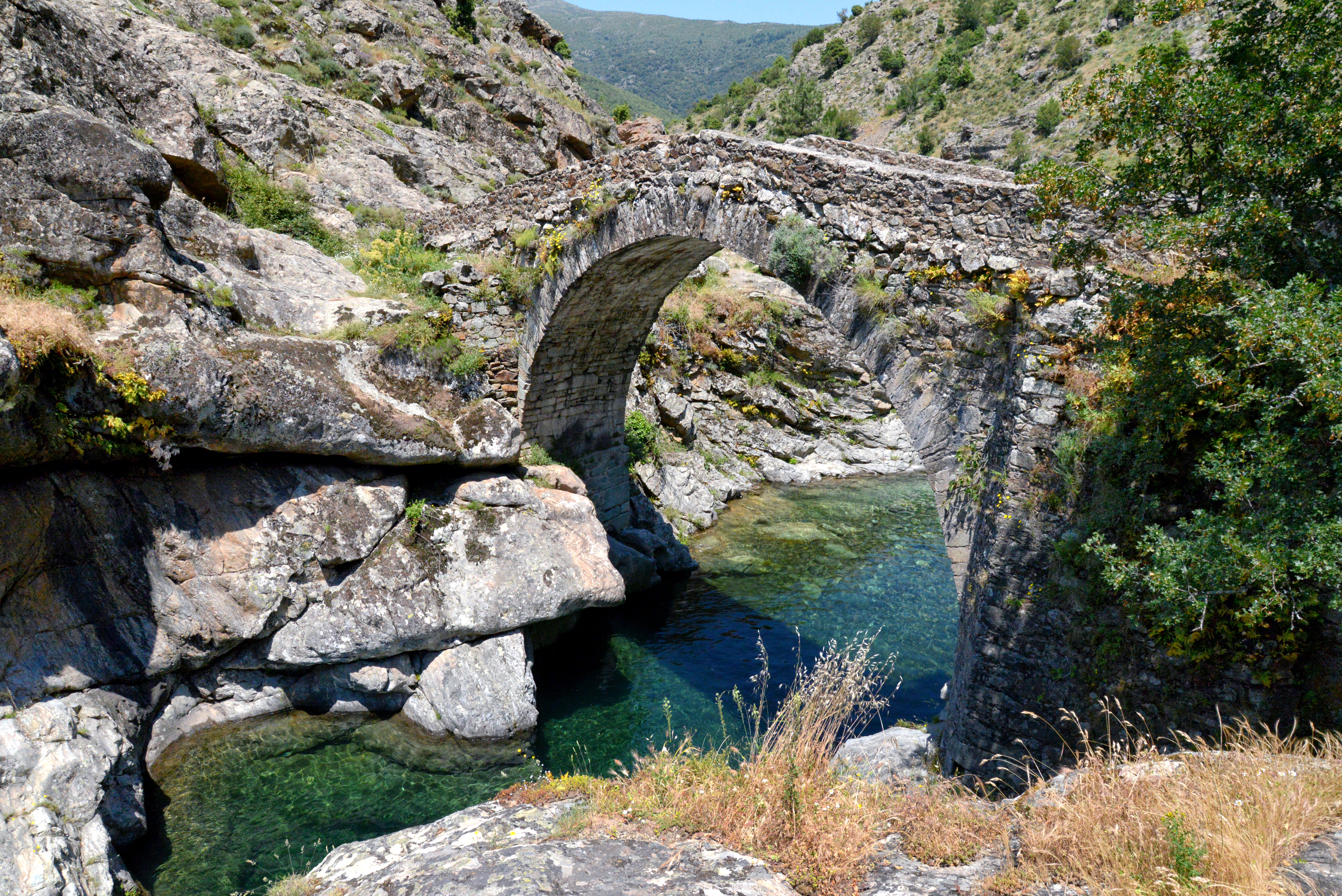
View upstream

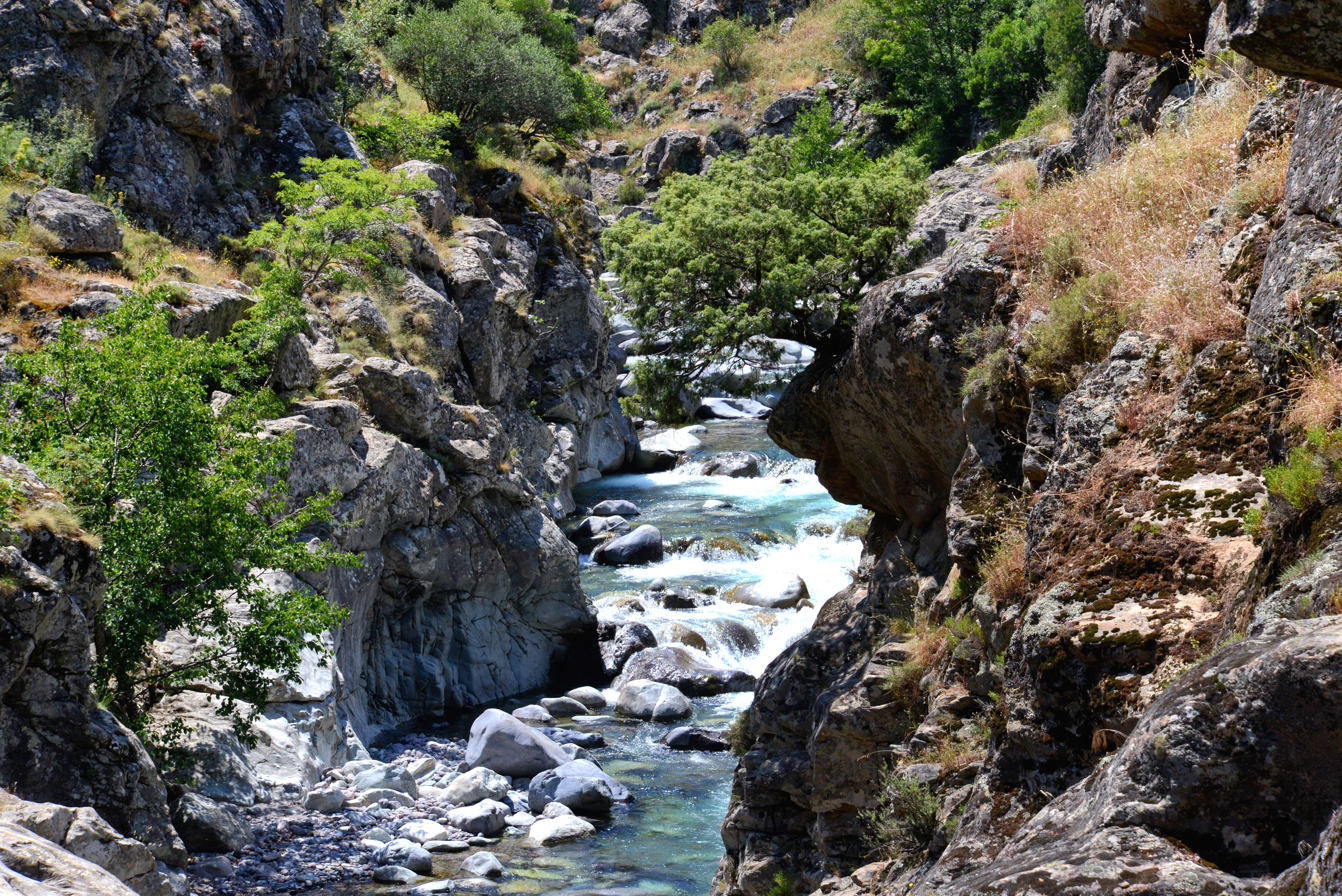
The Asco upstream from the bridge

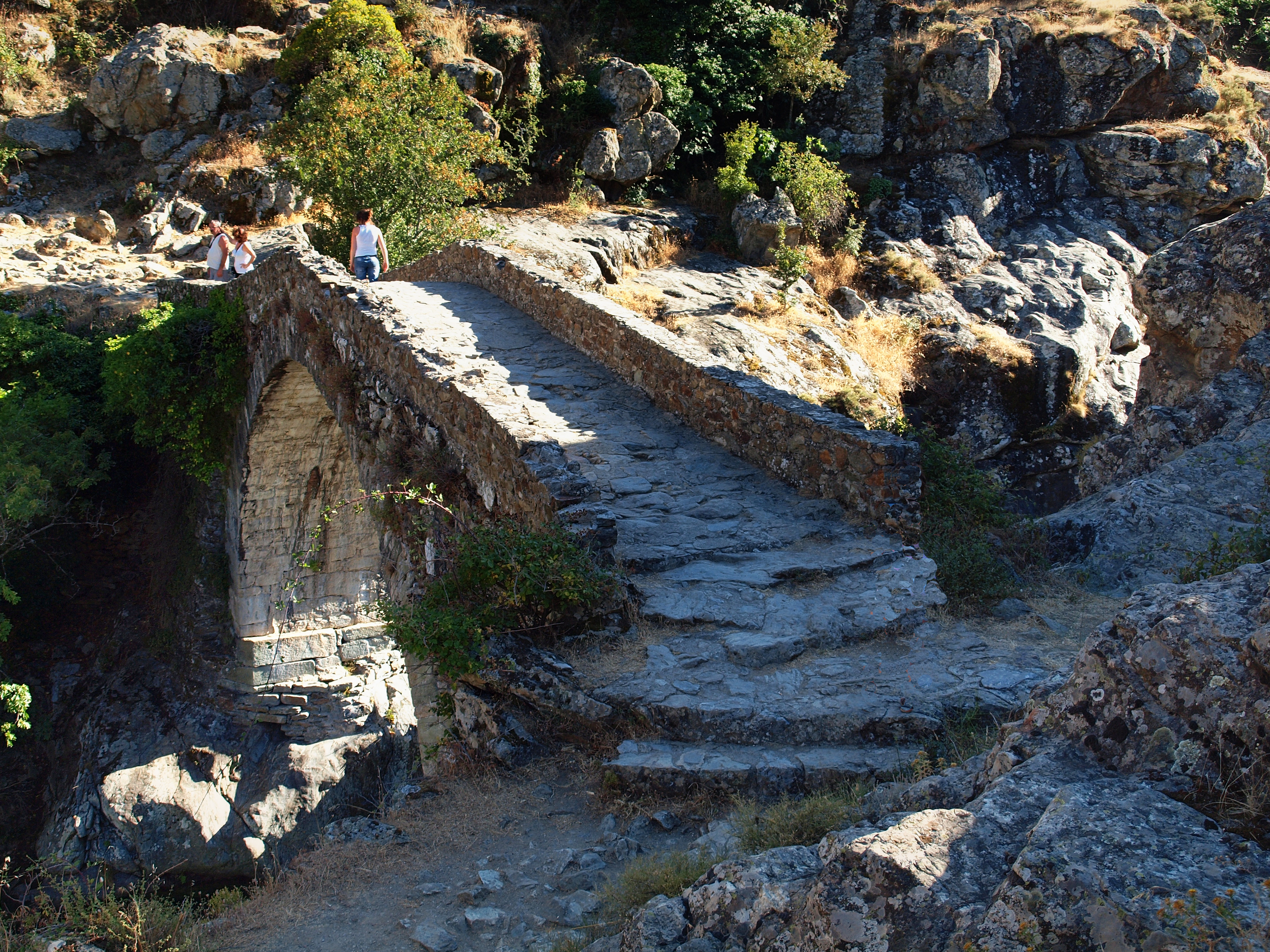
The road

==== Other sites ====
- The War memorial faces the Church of Saint-Michel Archangel.
- The Gorges of Asco. They are a remarkable defile that crosses the D147 road 6 km from the village with a wild landscape of granite rocks and steep cliffs. The Asco river has carved large natural pools in its bed which are popular in summer when motorists ignore the many signs prohibiting parking along the road.
- The Old Ski resort. Since the end of the 20th century nothing remains of the ski lift that was installed there. The Asco Stagnu plateau is the end of the D147 road. The stunning mountain location is popular with locals who come during winter and also with travellers who can see high green mountains close to the sea with its hot and dry coastline.

=== Religious heritage ===
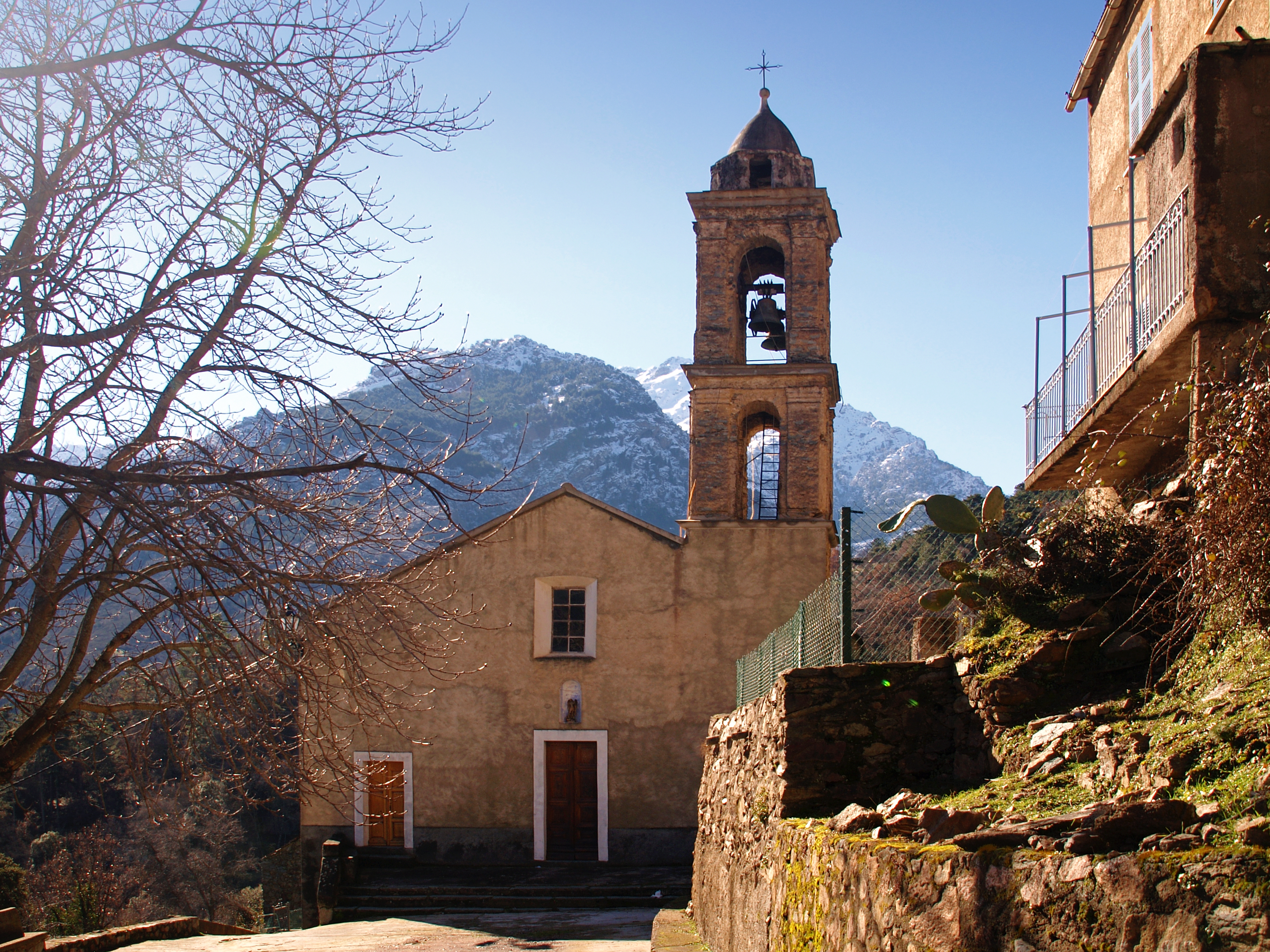
Church of Saint-Michel Archangel with Capo Bianco (2,562 m) behind

The Church of Saint-Michel Archangel with its bell tower and stone walls is located below the inner route serving the village which is closed to traffic except for residents. In the niche above the entrance is a statue of the Archangel Saint-Michel.

The ruined Chapel of Sant'Angelo is located at an altitude of 929 m to the north of the village. It lies on one of the walking trails.

=== Environmental heritage ===
Asco is part of the Regional Natural Park of Corsica in its "Territory of life" called Caccia-Ghjunsani.

The Fango Valley, which includes 9 communes including Asco and has an area of 4,416 hectares, has been declared a Biosphere Reserve with the central area called the Fango Valley (FR6300002).

Asco has 8 Natural Zones of Ecological, Faunistic, and Floristic Interest (ZNIEFF) of 2nd generation:

- Oak grove of Vallica (940004205)
- High peaks and slopes of Monte Cinto (940004233)
- Silvo-pastoral basin of Asco(940004188)
- High Forest of Carozzica (940004189)
- Gorges of Asco (940004187)
- Vegetation on the summit of Monte Cinto (940013188)
- Asco bridge (940030398)
- Vallon de la Tassinetta (940004203)

== Holidays and leisure activities ==
Each year on 29 September, the feast day of Saint Michel, the feast is celebrated in the village starting with a Mass in the village church then a procession through the streets and ending with singing and a feast.

=== Hiking ===
- GR 20. The GR 20 hiking trail passes through the commune between Bocca di Stagnu (1,990 m) and Bocca Tumasginasca (2,183 m) at an altitude of 500 m to the north-west of Punta Minuta (2,556 m) in order to pass the refuge of Asco Stagnu (P.N.R.C.) where it is possible to camp overnight.
- A Hiking Trail from the Asco village which enters the Giunssani via Bocca di Laggiarello (1,232 m) crossing the Forest of Tartagine-Melaja along the Tartagine then crossing the Bocca di l'Ondela (1,845 m) following the right bank of the Ruisseau de l'Ondella which lower down changes its name to the Ruisseau de la Tassineta and finally rejoining the D147 at the Maison du Mouflon et de la Nature.

== In popular culture ==
Asco is the center point for the fictional "Rally Mediterraneo" in EA Sport WRC. The longest stage of the rally is named after the village.

== Gallery ==
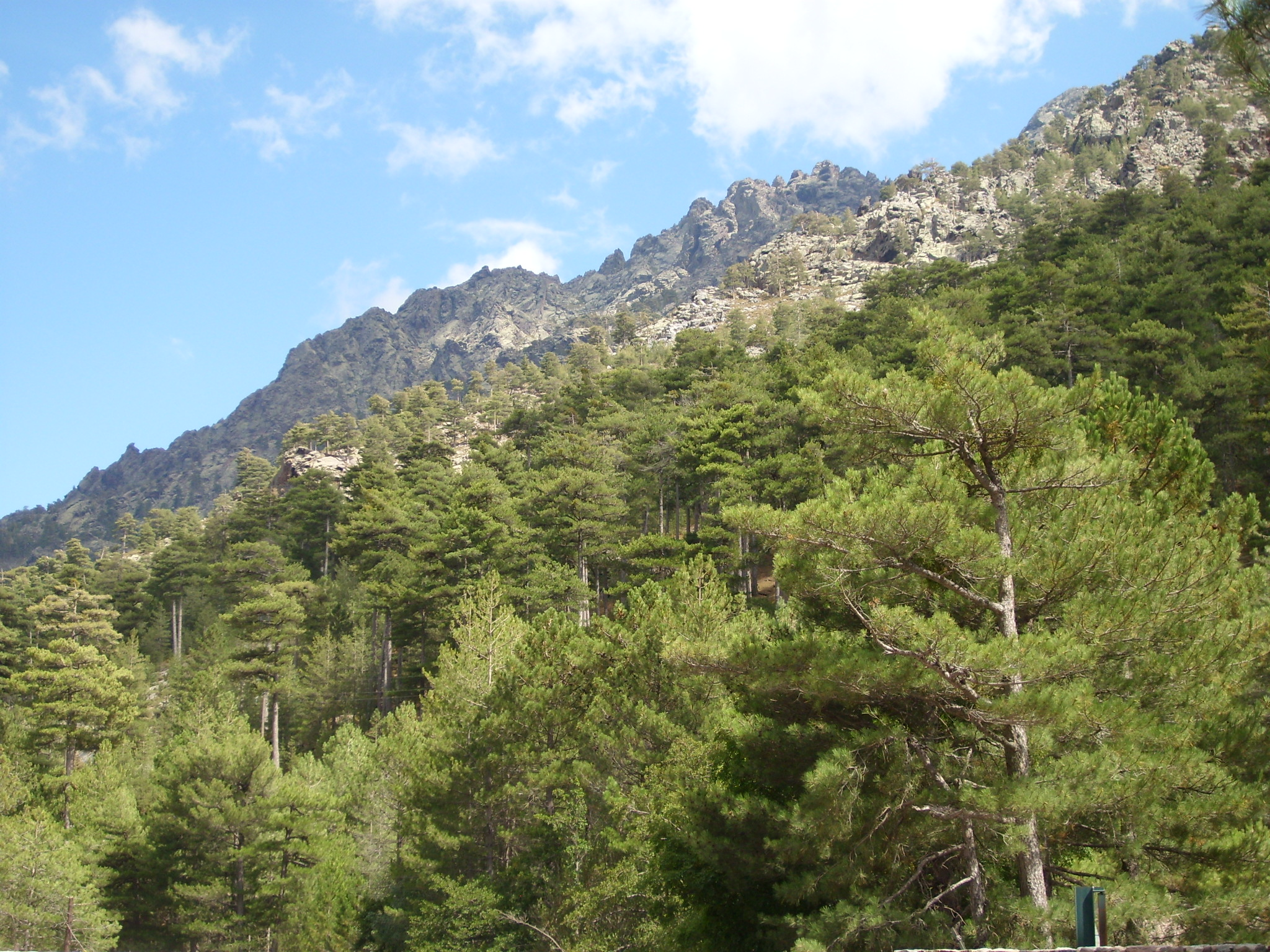
Mountains in the Asco Valley

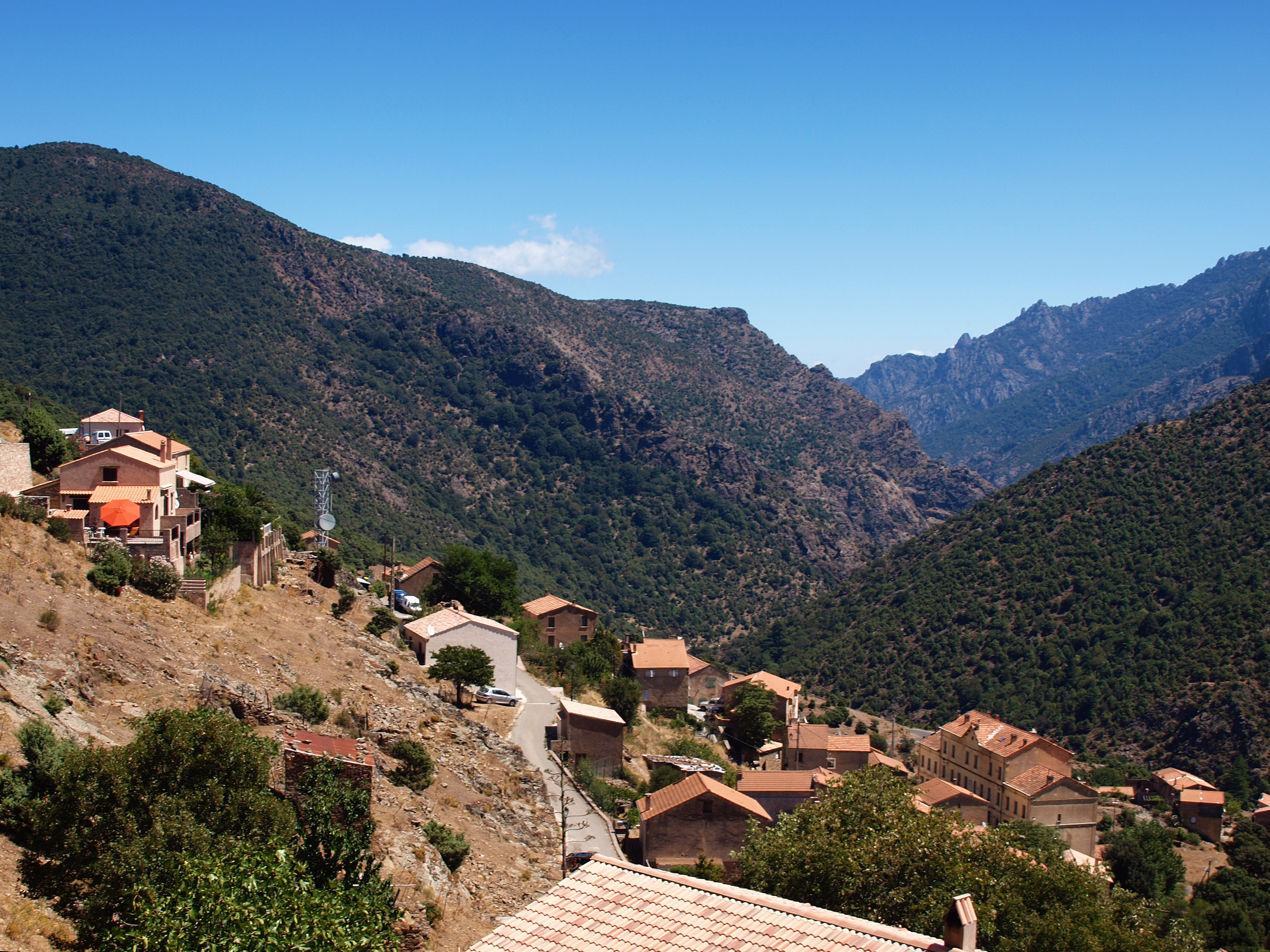
The Valley upostream of the gorges

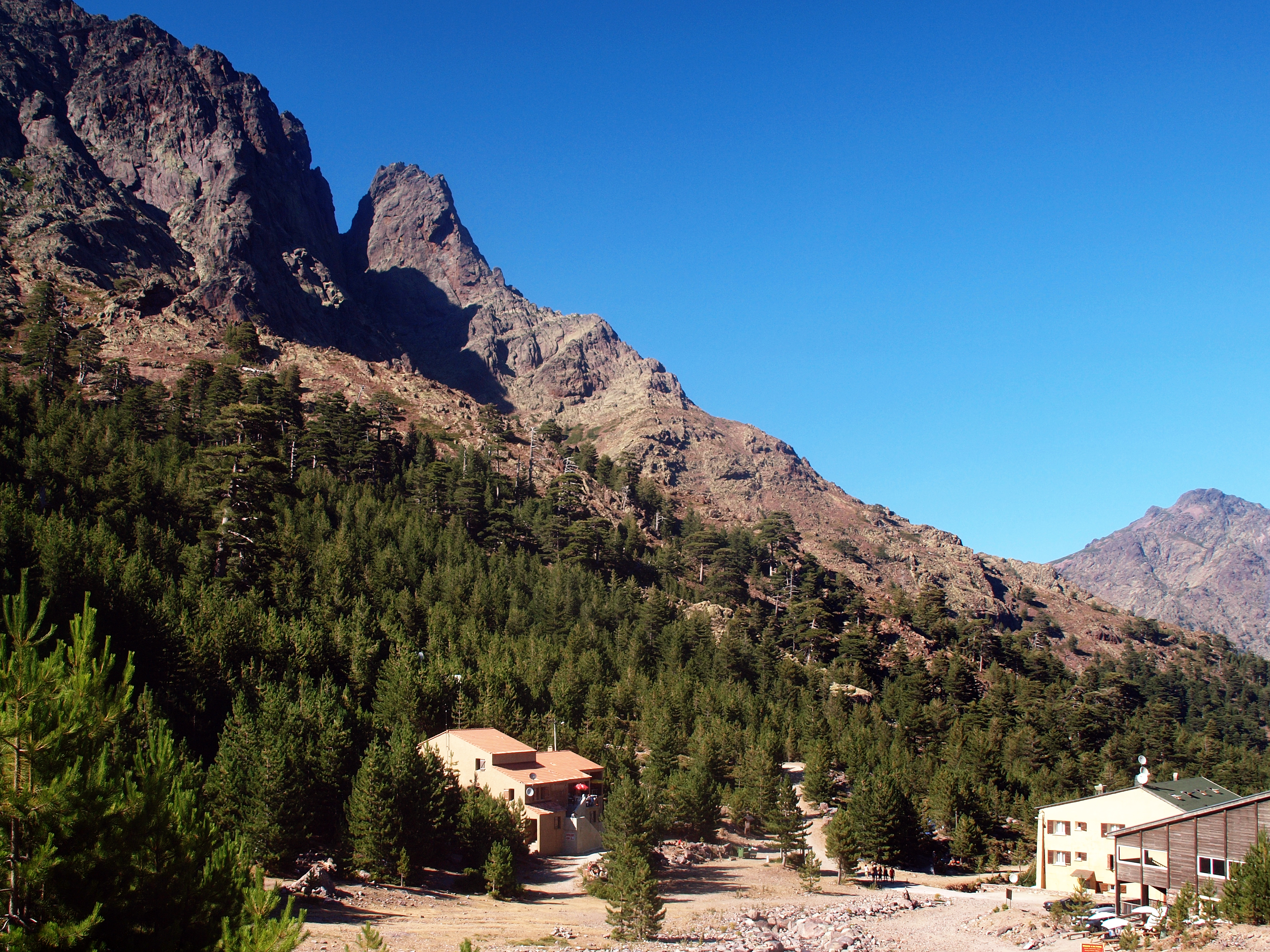
The Plateau of Stagnu

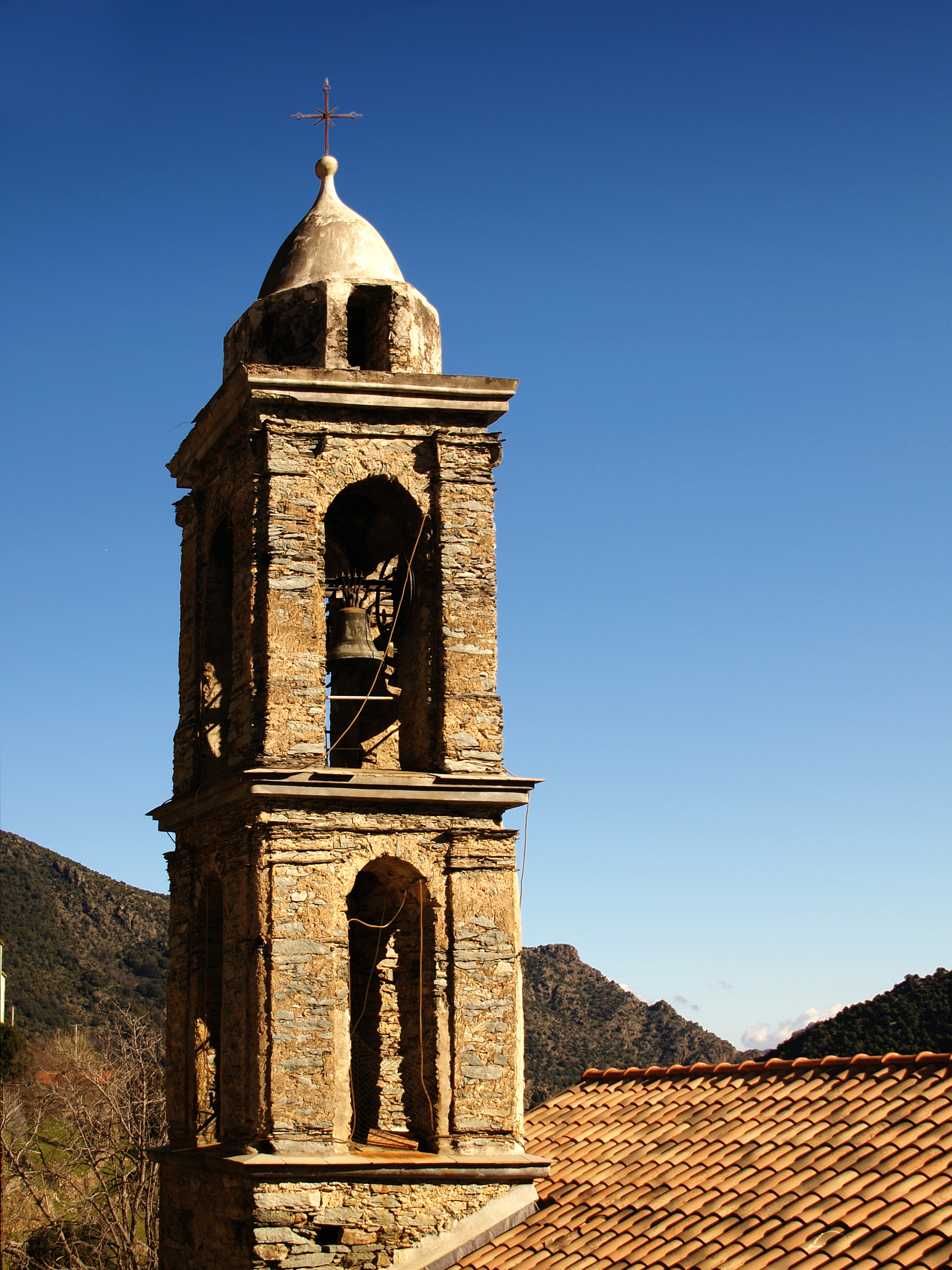
The bell tower on the Church of Saint-Michel

== Notable people linked to the commune ==
- Jean Maestrali (1903 at Asco 1903 - 1972 at L'Île-Rousse), poet.
- Antoine-Léonard Massiani (Novella 1816-1888), Doctor. Published Viaghiu in Ascu in Corsican.
- Antoine Trojani (1901 at Asco 1901 - 1991 at Ajaccio), notable Corsican writer. Activist for the unification of writing.

== See also ==
- Communes of the Haute-Corse department
