= Tartagine =

River in the department of Haute-Corse, Corsica

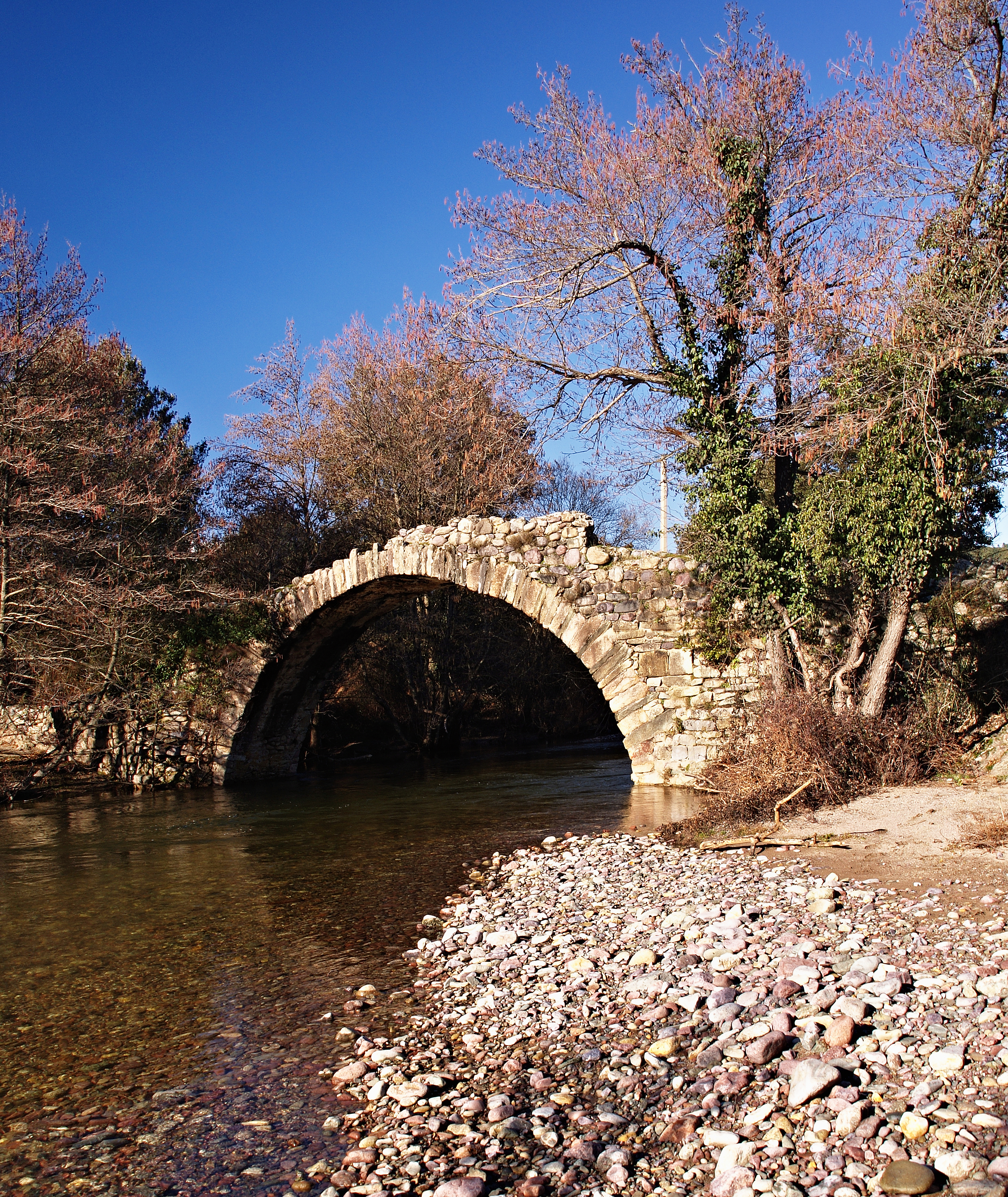
- Genoese bridge at Castifao

- Location within Corsica Location within France

Location
- Country: France
- Region: Corsica
- Department: Haute-Corse

Physical characteristics
- Mouth: Asco
  - coordinates: 42.48351°N 9.19109°E

Basin features
- Progression: Asco→ Golo→ Tyrrhenian Sea

The Tartagine (French: Rivière de Tartagine) is a river in the department of Haute-Corse, Corsica, France. It flows through the Monte Cinto Massif. It is a tributary of the Asco, which in turn is a tributary of the Golo.

== Course ==
The Tartagine is 30.32 kilometres (18.84 mi) long. It crosses the communes of Canavaggia, Castifao, Mausoléo, Moltifao, Olmi-Cappella and Vallica.

The Tartagine rises to the east of the 2,144 metres (7,034 ft) Monte Corona in the commune of Olmi-Cappella. It is known as the Ruisseau de Balaninu in its upper section above the Fontaine de Targtagine. The river flows northeast through the Forêt de Tartagine-Melaja to the south of the village of Mausoléo, then east to the village of Piana north of Castifao, then southeast to its confluence with the Asco to the north of Ponte Leccia. The Asco in turn joins the Golo soon after.

Downstream from Piana the Tartagine is followed by the D247 road and then the T30 road.

== Environment ==
The Forêt de Tartagine (Tartagine Forest) is dominated by maritime pines (Pinus pinaster) and black pines (Pinus nigra laricio), but has varied flora and fauna including golden eagle (Aquila chrysaetos), bearded vulture (Gypaetus barbatus) and mouflon (Ovis gmelini). In the 1990s the forest was cleaned up and the trails were marked for visitors. Hiking trails connect the villages and the remains of old mills and Genoese bridges. The river is shaded by trees and fairly calm, so is a popular place for families to walk and swim.

== Tributaries ==
The following streams (ruisseaux) are tributaries of the Tartagine:

- Forci 9 kilometres (5.6 mi)
  - Bocigione 5 kilometres (3.1 mi)
  - Cavoni 1 kilometre (0.62 mi)
- Melaja (river) 8 kilometres (5.0 mi)
  - San Parteo 2 kilometres (1.2 mi)
  - Grossi 2 kilometres (1.2 mi)
  - Caselle 2 kilometres (1.2 mi)
  - Rega 1 kilometre (0.62 mi)
  - Buginu 1 kilometre (0.62 mi)
  - Germanu 1 kilometre (0.62 mi)
- San Pietro 8 kilometres (5.0 mi)
  - Valle di Luco 2 kilometres (1.2 mi)
- Vadarbico 7 kilometres (4.3 mi)
  - Aghia Aschese 2 kilometres (1.2 mi)
  - Conculaccio 2 kilometres (1.2 mi)
- Francioni 6 kilometres (3.7 mi)
  - Avarozia 3 kilometres (1.9 mi)
  - Pinelli 2 kilometres (1.2 mi)
  - Pandigranaccio 2 kilometres (1.2 mi)
  - Piane 1 kilometre (0.62 mi)
- Rosario 4 kilometres (2.5 mi)
  - Atembre 2 kilometres (1.2 mi)
- Alzone 3 kilometres (1.9 mi)
  - Monti Rossi 1 kilometre (0.62 mi)
- Lagani 3 kilometres (1.9 mi)
- Scalambra 3 kilometres (1.9 mi)
- Cattarello 3 kilometres (1.9 mi)
  - Conconi 1 kilometre (0.62 mi)
- Arena 3 kilometres (1.9 mi)
  - Aulina 1 kilometre (0.62 mi)
- Frescolina 3 kilometres (1.9 mi)
- la Calanca Mozza 2 kilometres (1.2 mi)
- Petra Inone 2 kilometres (1.2 mi)
- Pino 2 kilometres (1.2 mi)
- Muraccie 2 kilometres (1.2 mi)
- Muraticalvi 2 kilometres (1.2 mi)
- Forcine 2 kilometres (1.2 mi)
- Forci 2 kilometres (1.2 mi)
- Purgatorio 2 kilometres (1.2 mi)
- Line e d'Alzo 2 kilometres (1.2 mi)
- Piovanaccio 2 kilometres (1.2 mi)
- Paratella 2 kilometres (1.2 mi)
- Vitalba 2 kilometres (1.2 mi)
- Palmente 2 kilometres (1.2 mi)
- Migiatto 1 kilometre (0.62 mi)
- Quercitello 1 kilometre (0.62 mi)
- Castiglione 1 kilometre (0.62 mi)
  - Casiccia 2 kilometres (1.2 mi)
- Corona 1 kilometre (0.62 mi)
- Calanello 1 kilometre (0.62 mi)
- Marcognaninco 1 kilometre (0.62 mi)
- Saltellole 1 kilometre (0.62 mi)
- Cutticcio 1 kilometre (0.62 mi)
- Sugitte 1 kilometre (0.62 mi)
- Pratella 1 kilometre (0.62 mi)

== Sources ==
- "La Tartagine", Camping les Castors (in French)
- "Relation: Rivière de Tartagine (10294487)", OpenStreetMap
- "Rivière de Tartagine", Sandre (in French)
