= Monte Padro =

Mountain in Corsica, France

- Padru (Corsican)
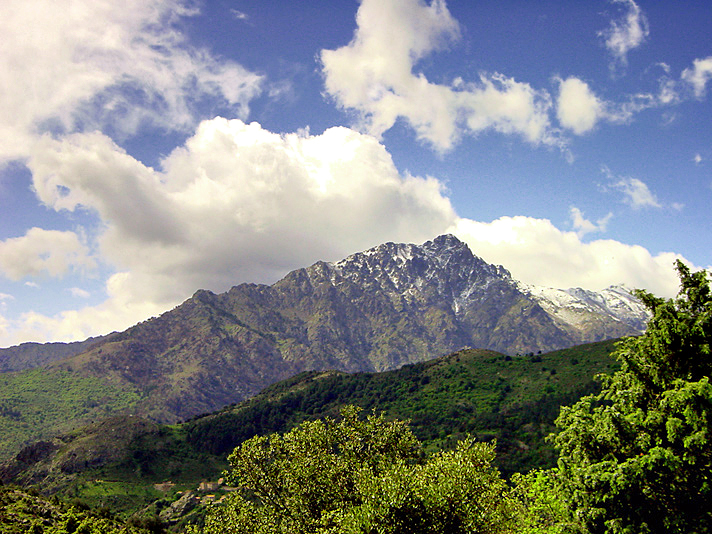

Highest point
- Elevation: 2,389 m (7,838 ft)
- Prominence: 552 m (1,811 ft)
- Isolation: 7.2 km (4.5 mi) to Capu Biancu
- Coordinates: 42°27′59″N 8°59′20″E

Geography
- Location within Corsica
- Country: France
- Department: Haute-Corse
- Parent range: Monte Cinto Massif

Monte Padro (Corsican: Padru) is a 2,389 metres (7,838 ft) mountain in the department of Haute-Corse on the island of Corsica, France. It is in the Monte Cinto Massif.

== Location ==
Monte Padro is on the ridge that defines the border between the communes of Olmi-Cappella to the north and Asco to the south. The ridge slopes down to the east into the island's central valley. The village of Asco is to the southeast of the mountain. The Asco river runs past the south of the mountain, with the D147 road running parallel to the road.

== Physical ==
Monte Padro is 2,389 metres (7,838 ft) high. It has a prominence of 552 metres (1,811 ft) and isolation of 7.18 kilometres (4.46 mi). from its nearest higher neighbor, the 2,562 metres (8,406 ft) Capu Biancu, to the south. The 2,395 metres (7,858 ft) Cima di a Statoghia is to the west, and the 2,144 metres (7,034 ft) Monte Corona is further to the west. Streams draining the south slopes of Monte Padru are tributaries to the Asco river, while streams draining the northern slopes are tributaries of the Tartagine river.

== Gallery ==
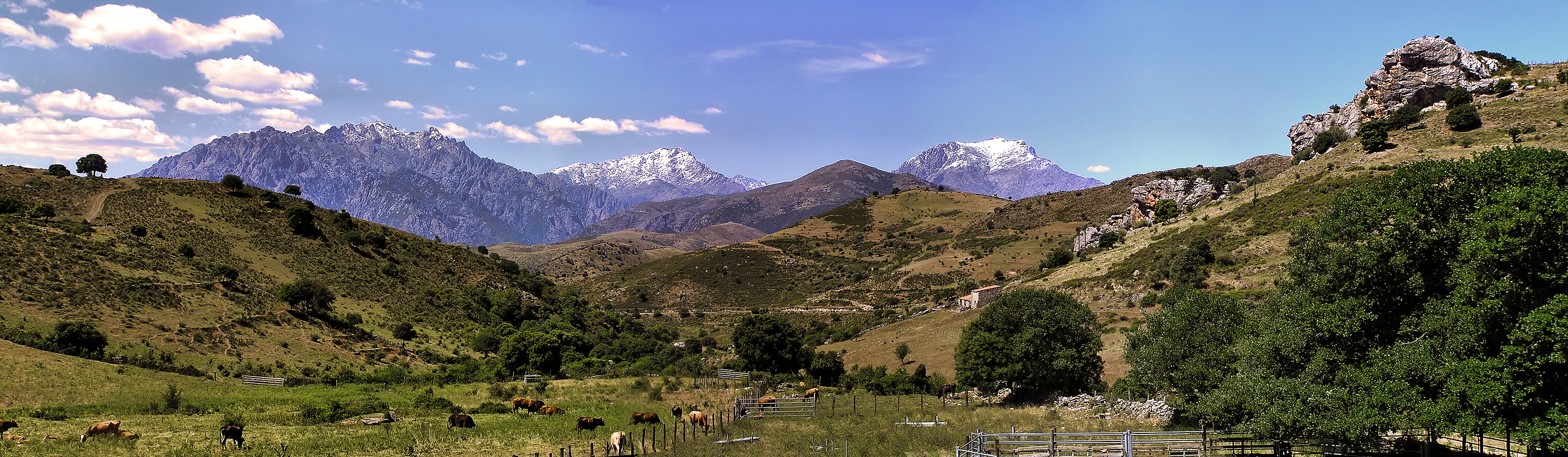
Monte Padru seen from the "Balanina" in Pietralba

== Sources ==
- "Monte Padro", PeakVisor
- "Monte Padru, France", Peakbagger
- "Monte Padru", Géoportail (in French)
- "Node: Monte Padro (26863917)", OpenStreetMap
