= Asco =

Asco or ASCO may refer to:

- Asco, Haute-Corse, France, a commune
- Asco (river), a river in Haute-Corse, France
- Ascó, a village in Catalonia, Spain
- Ascó Nuclear Power Plant
- Asco (art collective), an East Los Angeles–based artist group
- American Society of Clinical Oncology
- Arab Satellite Communications Organization
- ASCO Numatics, a brand or acquisition of Emerson Electric
- AirScooter Corporation's ticker symbol
- Asco (meteorite), a meteorite fall in 1805 on the island of Corsica, France
- AS Chaudière-Ouest, a Canadian soccer team
- Asian small-clawed otter
- Azerbaijan Caspian Shipping Company, state-owned Azerbaijani shipping company
