= Capo al Berdato =

Mountain in France

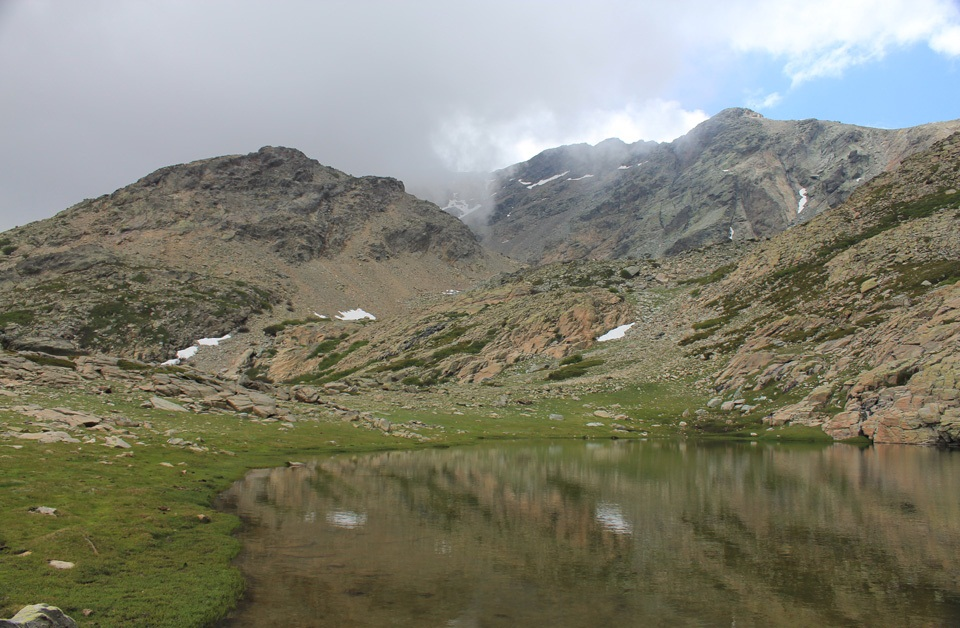
- Capu a u Verdatu, center-right, from Lac de Ghiarghe Rosse

Highest point
- Elevation: 2,583 m (8,474 ft)
- Coordinates: 42.3917°N 8.9789°E

Geography
- Location within Corsica
- Country: France
- Department: Haute-Corse

Capo al Berdato (Note: The English form of the name is the same as the Genoese form, used officially until the mid-19th century. The current official name Capu a u Verdatu is based on the Corsican Capu à u Pardatu) (French: Capu a u Verdatu, Corsican: Capu à u Pardatu) is a mountain in the department of Haute-Corse on the island of Corsica, France. It is in the Monte Cinto Massif.

== Location ==
Capu al Berdato is in the northwest of the island, in the Monte Cinto Massif. The commune of Asco is to the north and northeast, Lozzi is to the south and southeast, and Corscia is to the east. The D147 road runs to the north of the mountain down the Asco river valley to the village of Asco. Lac Maggiore is below the peak to the east.

== Physical ==
Capo al Berdato is at an elevation of 2,583 metres (8,474 ft) and prominence of 163 metres (535 ft). It is connected to 2,706 metres (8,878 ft) Monte Cinto to the southwest by the Créte de Sellola, a ridge. Another ridge, the Pianu di Terra Corsica, connects it to the 2,079 metres (6,821 ft) Capu Terra Corsica to the southeast. A third ridge connects it to the 2,562 metres (8,406 ft) Capu Biancu to the northeast. The north and west of the mountain is drained by tributaries of the Asco river, while the south and east of the mountain is drained by tributaries of the Golo river.

== Gallery ==
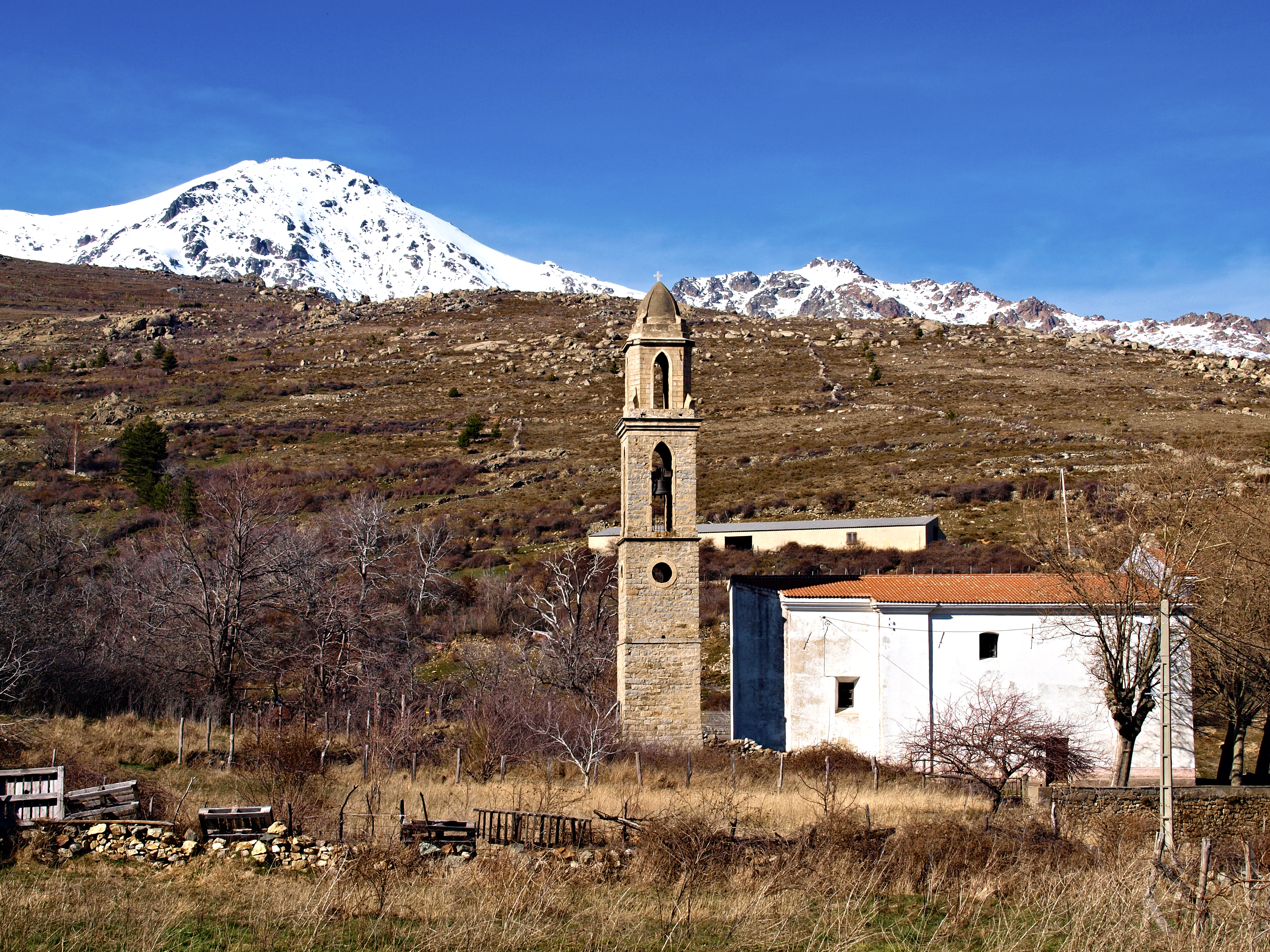
Capu a u Verdatu from Poggio-di-Lozzi

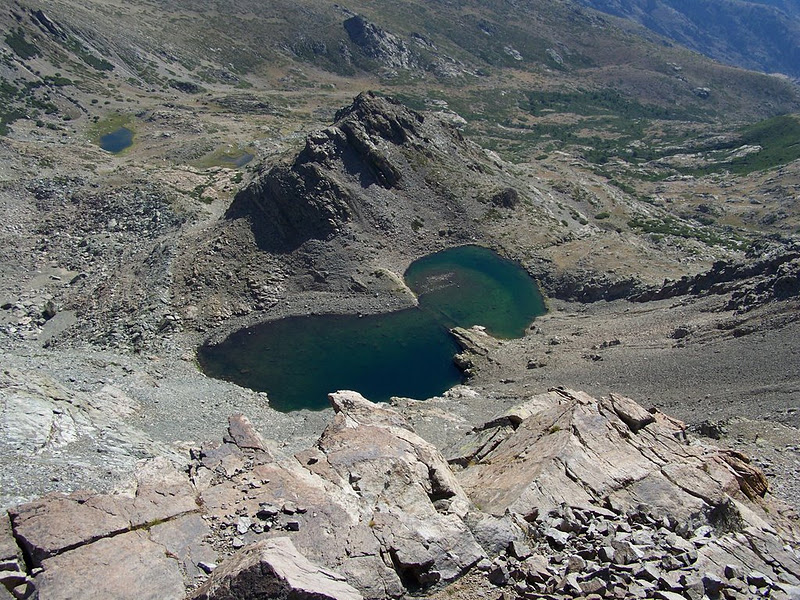
Lac Maggiore from Capu a u Verdatu

== Sources ==
- "Capu a u Verdatu", Géonames
- "Capo al Berdato", peakvisor
- "Node: Capo al Berdato (2151642433)", OpenStreetMap
