= Capu Biancu =

Mountain on the island of Corsica, France

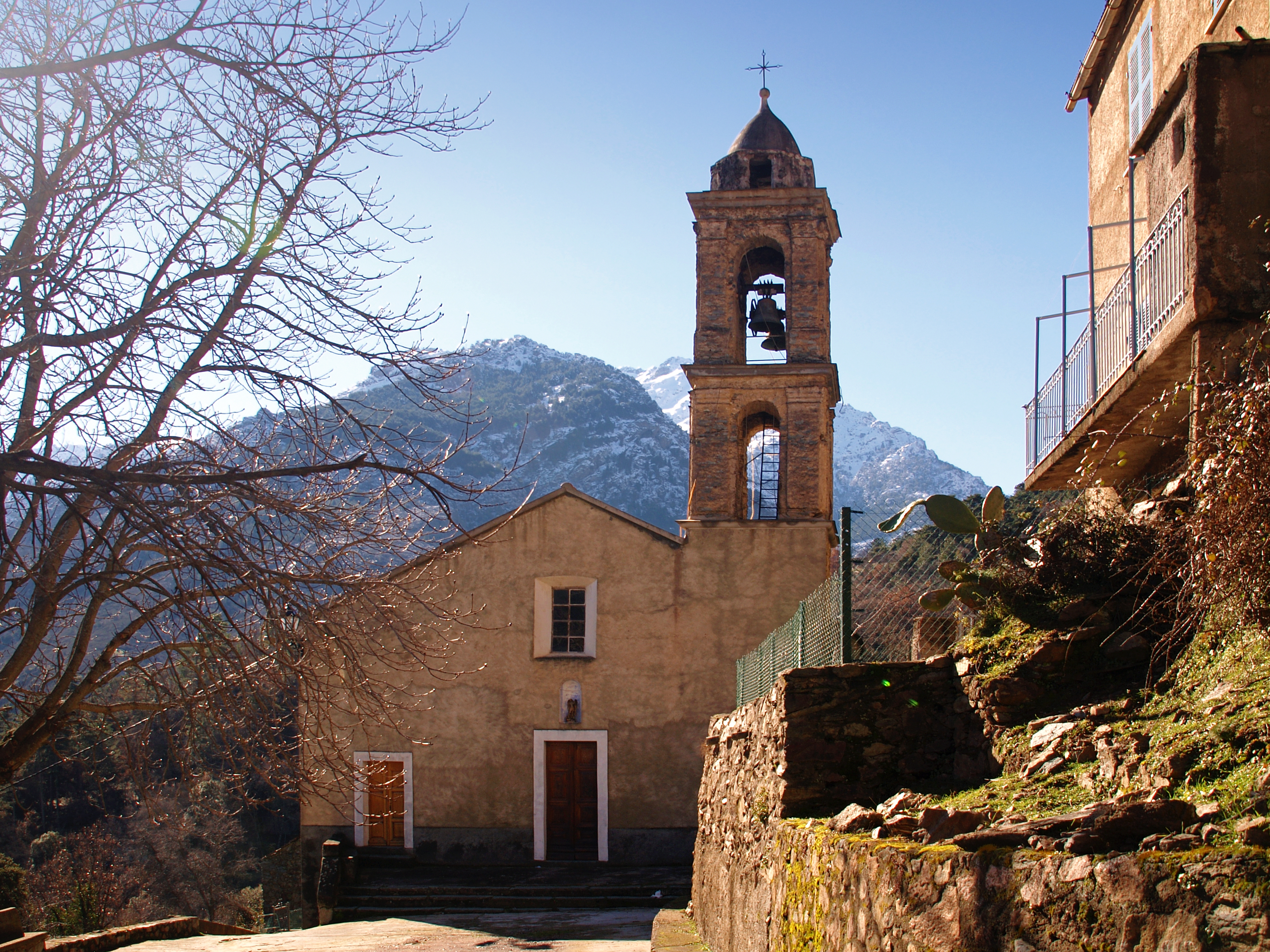
- Église Saint-Michel Archange in Asco. Snow-covered Capu Biancu behind the bell tower

Highest point
- Coordinates: 42.402088°N 8.988466°E

Geography
- Location within Corsica
- Country: France
- Department: Haute-Corse

The Capu Biancu is a mountain in the department of Haute-Corse on the island of Corsica, France.

== Location ==
Capu Biancu is on a ridge that forms the boundary between the communes of Asco and Corscia in Haute-Corse. Other peaks on the ridge are the 2,583 metres (8,474 ft) Capo al Berdato to the west, and 2,268 metres (7,441 ft) Capo Razino to the east. The ridge separates the Asco valley to the north from the Niolo to the south. The nearest road is the D147 to the north, which runs west from the village of Asco. The Ruisseau de Ghieriosa rises to the west of the Capu Biancu. It is a tributary of the Ruisseau de Stranciacone, one of the headwaters of the Asco.

== Physical ==
The Capu Biancu has an elevation of 2,562 metres (8,406 ft) and a clean prominence of 140 metres (460 ft). It has an isolation of 3.62 kilometres (2.25 mi) from Monte Cinto to the southwest. It is in the Monte Cinto Massif.

== Hiking ==
The peak may be accessed from Asco through the Pinara Valley or from the village of Corscia on the Nolo side. The route from Corscia follows the road and then a marked trail past the Funtana di Callaiola to the Bergerie Caracuto, and then a line of cairns to the lake of Occihi Neri. From there the route is over scree and rock to the summit. It takes about ten hours out and back.

== Gallery ==
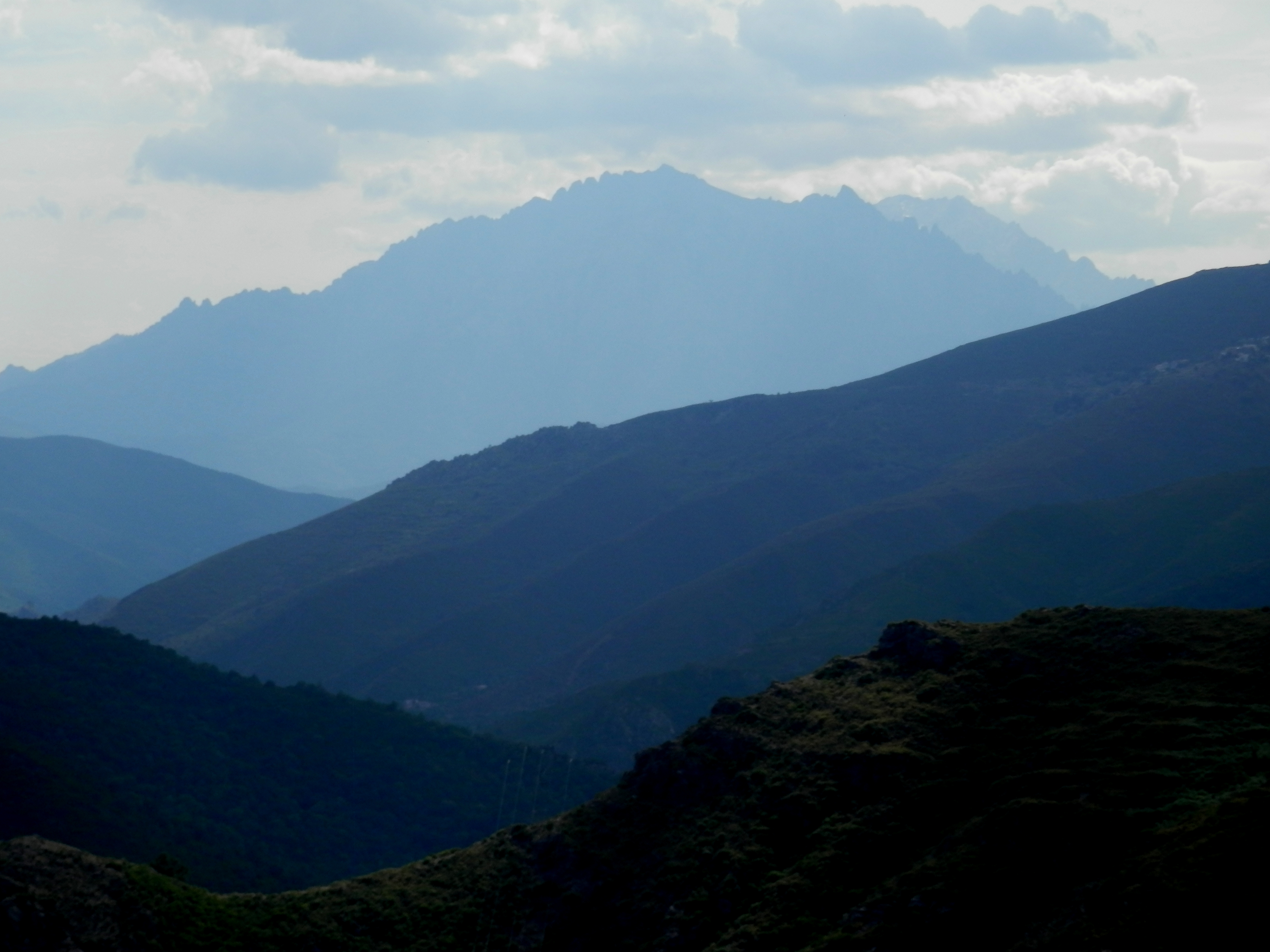
Penna Rossa and Capu Biancu from Custera

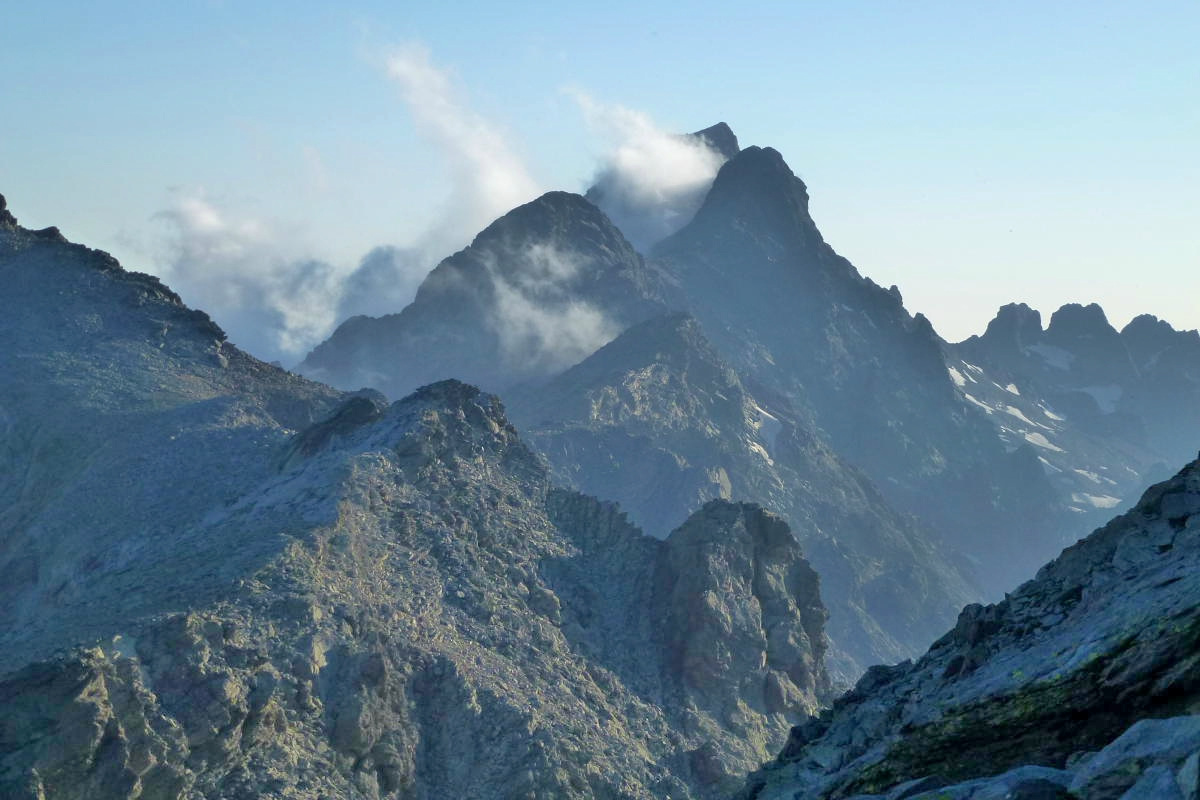
Monte Cinto from Capu Biancu

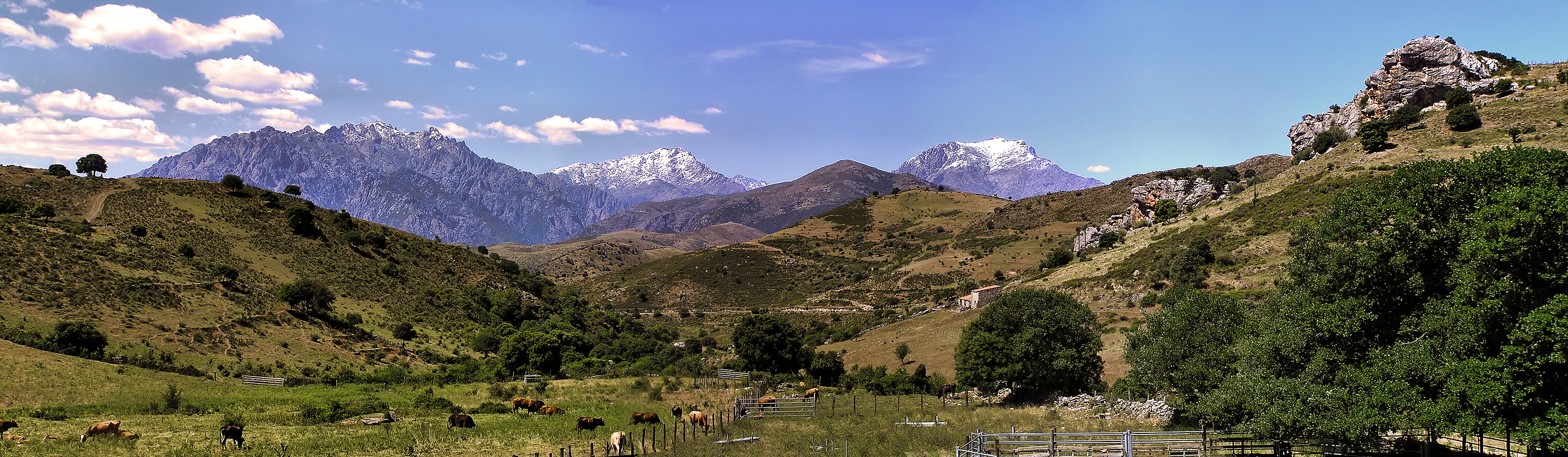
Cima à i Mori, Capu Biancu and Monte Padro snow-covered peaks

== Sources ==
- "Capu Biancu, France", Peakbagger
- "Capu Biancu", SummitPost
- "Node: Capu Biancu (670063160)", OpenStreetMap
