= Asco (river) =

River in the department of Haute-Corse, Corsica

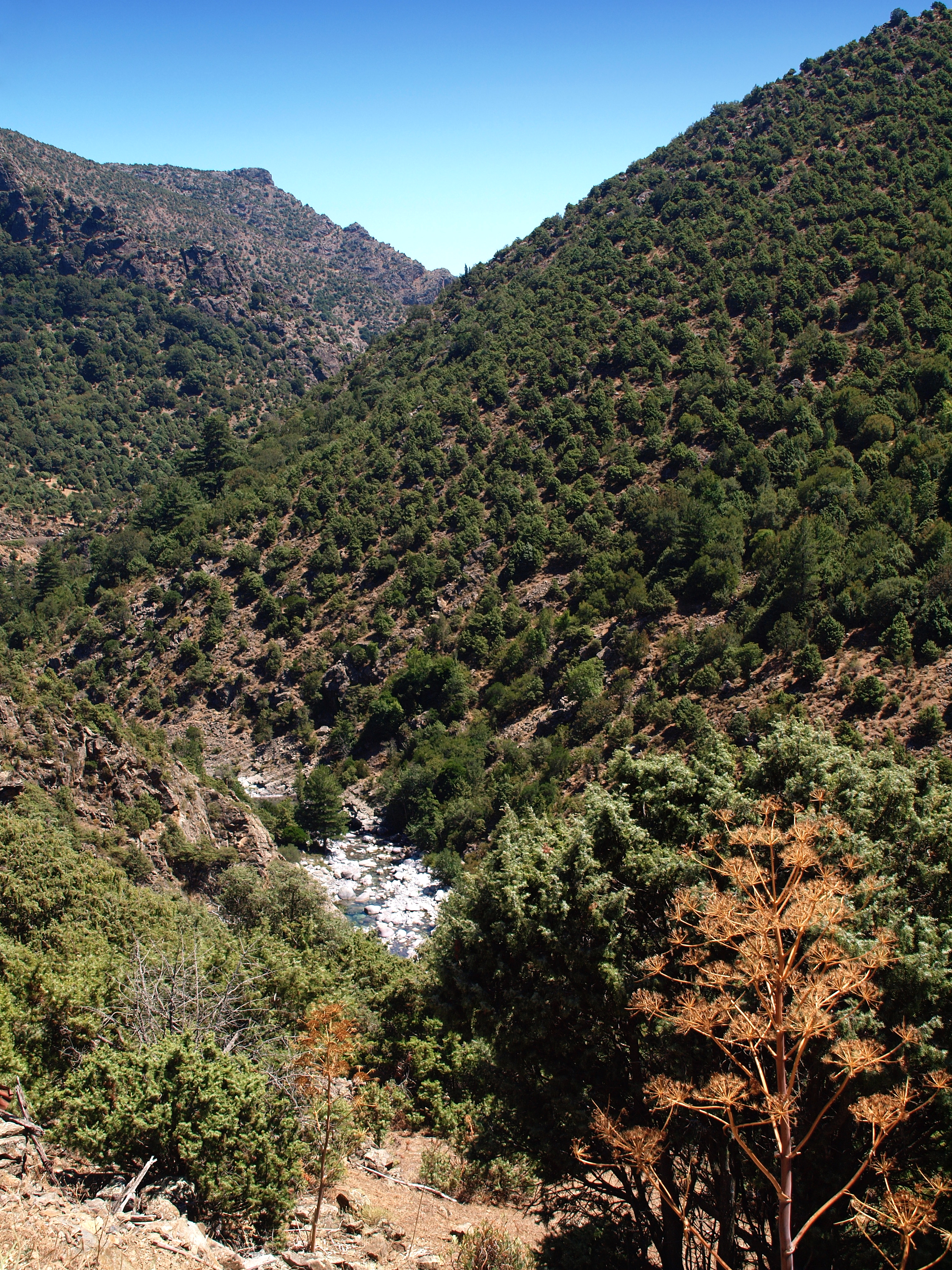
- Start of the gorges

- Location within Corsica Location within France
- Native name: Ascu (Corsican)

Location
- Country: France
- Region: Corsica
- Department: Haute-Corse

Physical characteristics
- Mouth: Golo
  - coordinates: 42.4716°N 9.2101°E

Basin features
- Progression: Golo→ Tyrrhenian Sea

The Asco (French pronunciation: [asko]; Corsican: Ascu) is a small river in the department of Haute-Corse, Corsica, France. It is a tributary of the Golo. The river rises in the Monte Cinto Massif among some of the highest mountains of Corsica, passes a ski resort and the old village of Asco and cuts through a dramatic 4 kilometres (2.5 mi) gorge before joining the Golo.

== Course ==
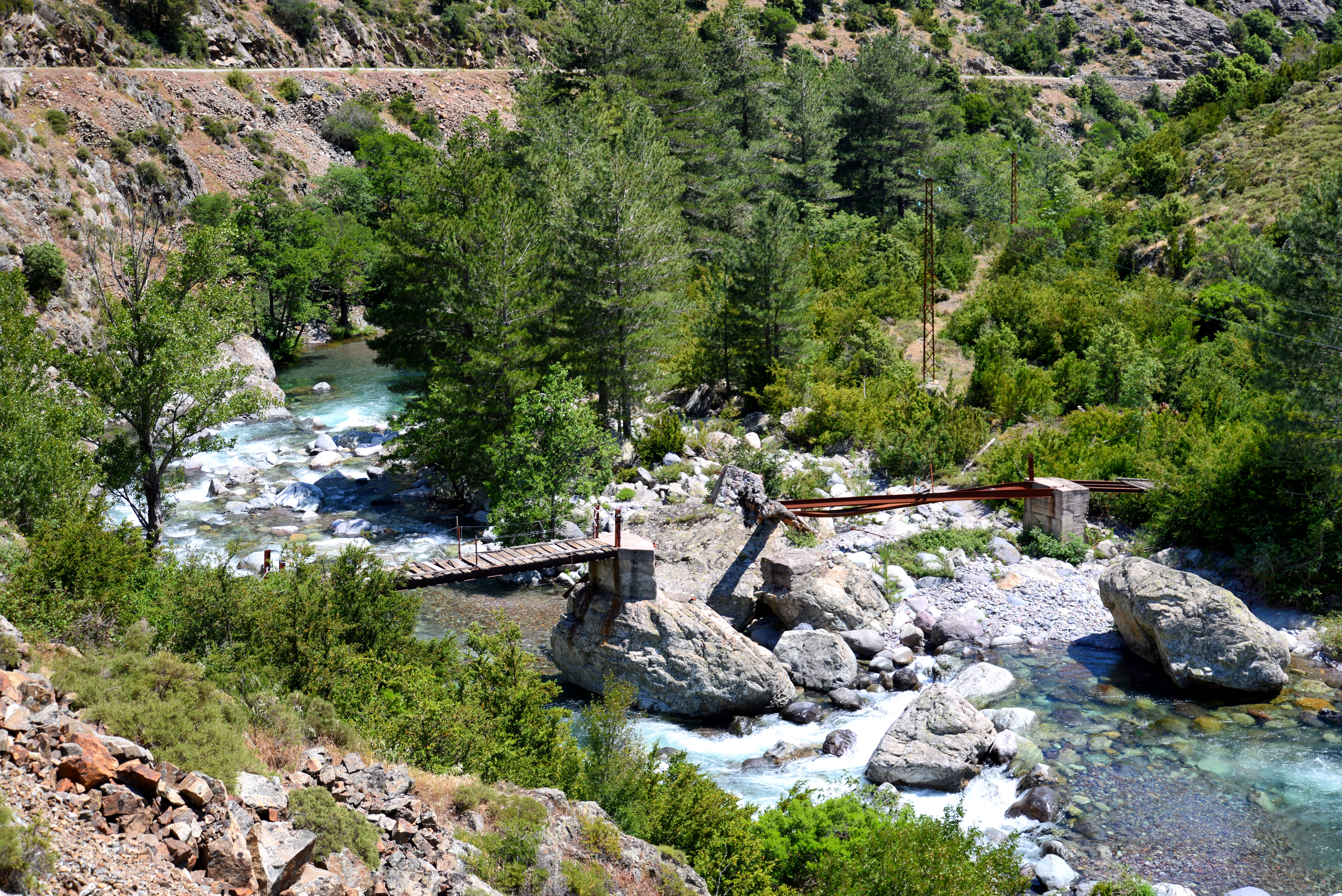
Footbridge over the Asco below Asco village, destroyed by a flood

The Asco is 34.01 kilometres (21.13 mi) long. It crosses the communes of Asco, Canavaggia, Moltifao and Morosaglia. It rises at an elevation of 2,130 metres (6,990 ft). The source is to the southeast of the 2,706 metres (8,878 ft) Monte Cinto.

The Asco flows northwest, then north past the Haut-Asco resort, then runs northeast to the village of Asco, east-northeast to the south of the village of Molifao, then east to a point just north of Ponte Leccia, where it joins the Golo. Its mouth is at an elevation of 184 metres (604 ft).

The Tartagine river joins the Asco about 2 kilometres (1.2 mi) above the confluence of the Asco with the Golo. The D147 follows the river from Haut-Asco to Moltifao, then the D47 follows it to Ponte Leccia. The D147 is a narrow, steep and winding but well-built road.

== Valley ==
=== Lower valley and gorge ===
From the start of the D147 by Moltifao, the village of Asco is about 12 kilometres (7.5 mi) upstream. The Asco gorge is a defile almost 4 kilometres (2.5 mi) long cut through red granite below Asco village. It runs through a rugged landscape of steep cliffs and granite rocks. In it the river has carved out large natural pools. There is little vegetation apart from some juniper and a few pines growing on the steep rick faces. The gorge draws many tourists in the summer months, attracted by its rugged topography and wild animals.

=== Village and Genoese bridge ===
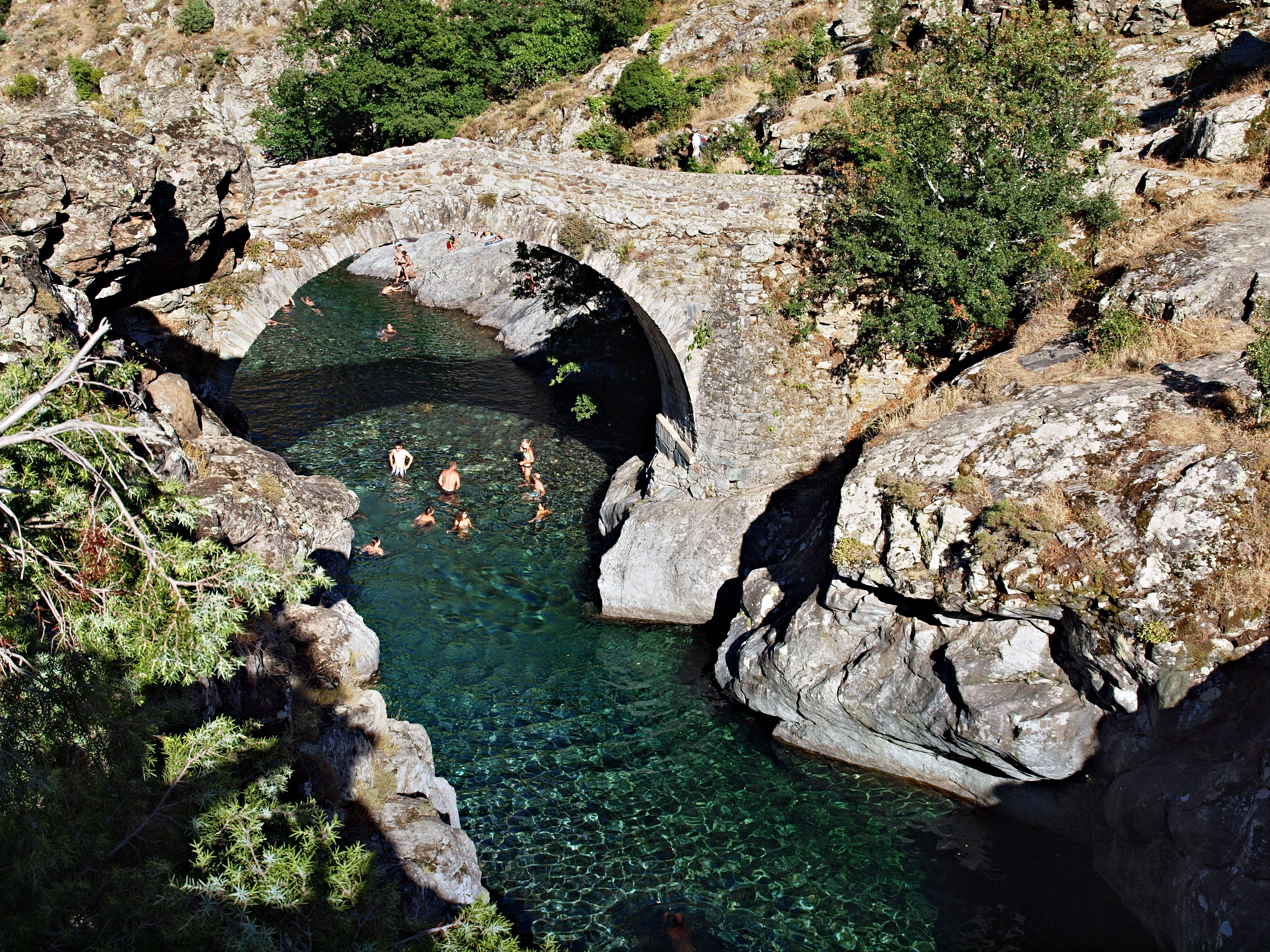
Genoese bridge and swimming pool

Asco village is at an elevation of 650 metres (2,130 ft). The village is surrounded by junipers, and clings to the mountainside. The road to this village was first opened in 1936. Today many of the old houses have been renovated. The village has a war memorial and the parish church of Archangel Saint Michael, with stone walls and a bell tower. The church was built in the 11th century, and is classified.

The nearby Genoese bridge was built in the 15th century when Corsica was occupied by the Republic of Genoa. It is below Asco village at an altitude of 535 metres (1,755 ft) on a winding secondary road that ends at the bridge. There is a natural swimming pool below the bridge, with cool water around 15 °C (59 °F) in summer.

=== Upper valley ===
Above Asco, the road continues for 14 kilometres (8.7 mi), passes through the Asco communal forest and ends at Haut-Asco, a small ski resort at an altitude of 1,450 metres (4,760 ft). The resort opens when there is enough snow, and has two fairly easy 600 metres (2,000 ft) ski slopes and two 100 metres (330 ft) beginner slopes. There is an eco-museum at Haut-Asco. The GR20 (Grande Randonnée 20) hiking trail passes through Haut-Asco. It is a 180 kilometres (110 mi) trail that crosses the high mountain range of Corsica.

The upper Asco valley has an alpine climate and alpine landscapes. The Stagnu plateau holding the ski resort is surrounded by a crest with some of the highest peaks in Corsica, including Capu Biancu: 2,562 metres (8,406 ft), Capu au Verdatu: 2,583 metres (8,474 ft), Punta Selolla: 2,592 metres (8,504 ft), Capu Ciuntrone: 2,656 metres (8,714 ft), Monte Cinto: 2,706 metres (8,878 ft), Pointe des Éboulis: 2,607 metres (8,553 ft), Punta Crucetta: 2,499 metres (8,199 ft), Capu Larghia: 2,503 metres (8,212 ft), Punta Minuta: 2,556 metres (8,386 ft), Punta Rossa: 2,247 metres (7,372 ft), Punta Missoghiu: 2,201 metres (7,221 ft).

== Hydrology ==
Measurements of the river flow were taken at the Morosaglia [Ponte-Leccia] station from 1959 to 2021. The watershed above this station covers 365 square kilometres (141 sq mi). Annual precipitation was calculated as 440 millimetres (17 in). The average flow of water throughout the year was 5.08 cubic metres per second (179 cu ft/s).

Average flow (cubic meters per second) by month for the period 1959 to 2021
Month	Flow
Jan	6.800
Feb	7.570
Mar	8.690
Apr	8.060
May	6.240
Jun	2.640
Jul	0.895
Aug	0.733
Sep	1.150
Oct	2.760
Nov	7.480
Dec	8.190

== Tributaries ==
The following streams (ruisseaux) are tributaries of the Asco:

- Tartagine: 30 kilometres (19 mi)
- Pinara: 7 kilometres (4.3 mi)
  - Stretta Grossa: 2 kilometres (1.2 mi)
  - Ombrone: 2 kilometres (1.2 mi)
- Negretto: 7 kilometres (4.3 mi)
- Logoniello: 6 kilometres (3.7 mi)
  - Valle Largi Tasso: 1 kilometre (0.62 mi)
- la Tassineta: 5 kilometres (3.1 mi)
  - Vitucciaghiu: 2 kilometres (1.2 mi)
  - l'Ondella: 2 kilometres (1.2 mi)
  - la Morazzani: 1 kilometre (0.62 mi)
  - la Filettella: 1 kilometre (0.62 mi)
- Valle Secche: 4 kilometres (2.5 mi)
  - Peduli: 1 kilometre (0.62 mi)
  - Volpaia: 1 kilometre (0.62 mi)
- Manica: 4 kilometres (2.5 mi)
  - Ghieriosa: 2 kilometres (1.2 mi)
- Grotta: 4 kilometres (2.5 mi)
- Ranza: 4 kilometres (2.5 mi)
- Tidigliani: 4 kilometres (2.5 mi)
  - Casafrancione: 2 kilometres (1.2 mi)
- Casanovaccia: 3 kilometres (1.9 mi)
  - Santonaccio: 2 kilometres (1.2 mi)
- Ventosi: 3 kilometres (1.9 mi)
  - Tula: 2 kilometres (1.2 mi)
- Muro: 3 kilometres (1.9 mi)
  - Castagnaccio: 2 kilometres (1.2 mi)
- l'Aiale: 3 kilometres (1.9 mi)
  - l'Ondella: 3 kilometres (1.9 mi)
- Ridondello: 3 kilometres (1.9 mi)
  - Pianelli: 2 kilometres (1.2 mi)
- Stretta a Merla: 2 kilometres (1.2 mi)
- Finusellu: 2 kilometres (1.2 mi)
- Gradelle: 2 kilometres (1.2 mi)
- Conche: 2 kilometres (1.2 mi)
- Corbica: 2 kilometres (1.2 mi)
- Valentinu: 2 kilometres (1.2 mi)
- Paterna: 2 kilometres (1.2 mi)
- Perelli: 2 kilometres (1.2 mi)
- Parci: 1 kilometre (0.62 mi)
- Pedirasino: 1 kilometre (0.62 mi)
- Mutola: 1 kilometre (0.62 mi)

== Sources ==
- "L'Asco à Morosaglia [Ponte-Leccia]", eaufrance (in French), Ministère de l'Ecologie, du Développement Durable et de l'Energie
- "L'Asco", Sandre (in French)
- La vallée (in French), Mairie d'Asco
- "Relation: L'Asco (7390803)", OpenStreetMap
- "Vallée d'Asco: gorges, baignade, village, pont génois et via ferrata", Bouger et voyager (in French)
