= Castifao =

Castifao Castifau (Corsican)
- Commune
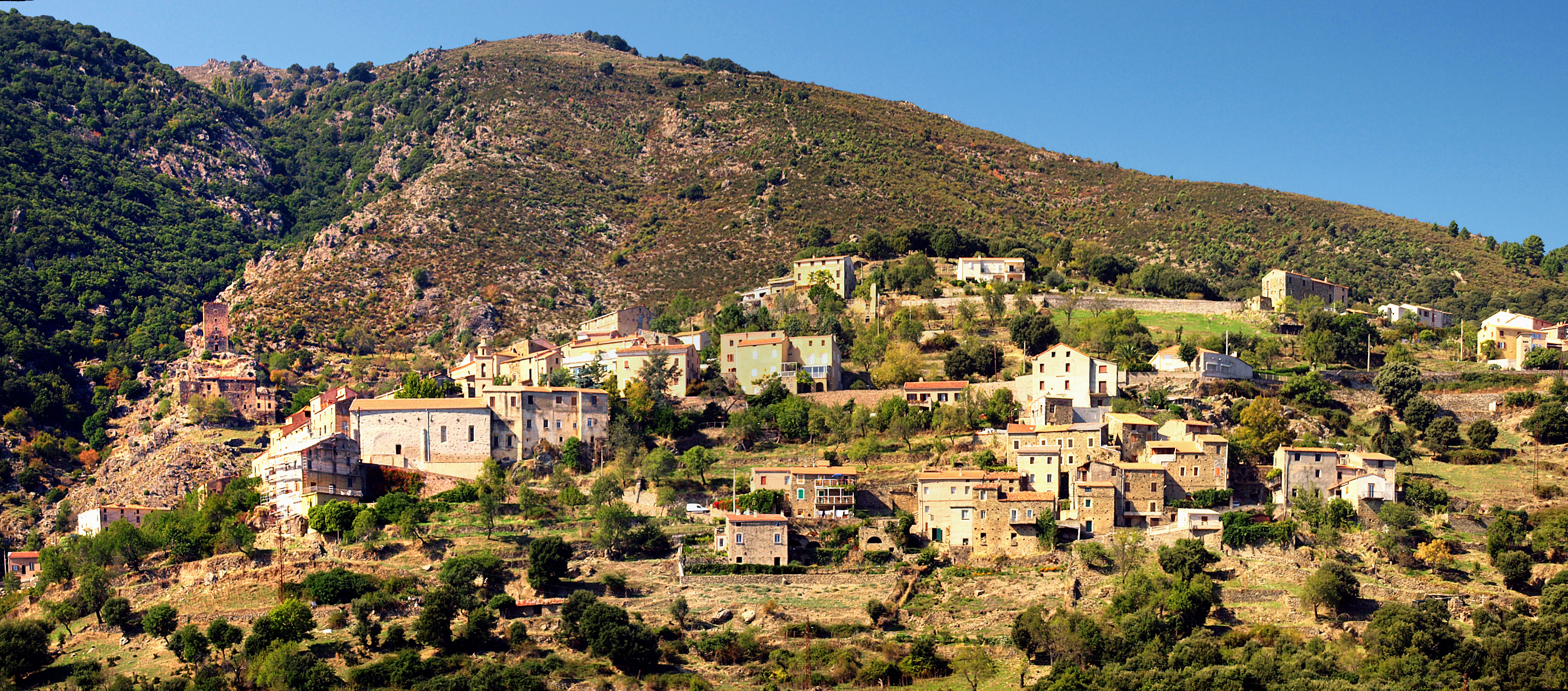
- A panorama of the village
- Location of Castifao
- Location within France Location within Corsica
- Coordinates: 42°30′19″N 9°06′45″E
- Country: France
- Region: Corsica
- Department: Haute-Corse
- Arrondissement: Corte
- Canton: Golo-Morosaglia
- Intercommunality: Pasquale Paoli

Government
  - Mayor (2020–2026): François Orsini
- Area^{1}: 42.15 km^{2} (16.27 sq mi)
- Elevation: 506 m (1,660 ft)
- Highest elevation: 1,049 m (3,442 ft)
- Lowest elevation: 219 m (719 ft)
- Population (2023): 168
  - Density: 3.99/km^{2} (10.3/sq mi)
- Time zone: UTC+01:00 (CET)
  - Summer (DST): UTC+02:00 (CEST)
- INSEE/Postal code: 2B080 /20218
- ^{1} French Land Register data, which excludes lakes, ponds, glaciers > 1 km^{2} (0.386 sq mi or 247 acres) and river estuaries.

Castifao (French pronunciation: [kastifao]; Corsican: Castifau) is a commune in the Haute-Corse department of France on the island of Corsica.

== Population ==
Historical population
Year	Pop.	±% p.a.
1968	266	—
1975	234	−1.81%
1982	223	−0.69%
1990	137	−5.91%
1999	152	+1.16%
2007	153	+0.08%
2012	160	+0.90%
2017	152	−1.02%
2023	168	+1.68%
Source: INSEE

== See also ==
- Communes of the Haute-Corse department
