= Ponte Leccia =

- Village
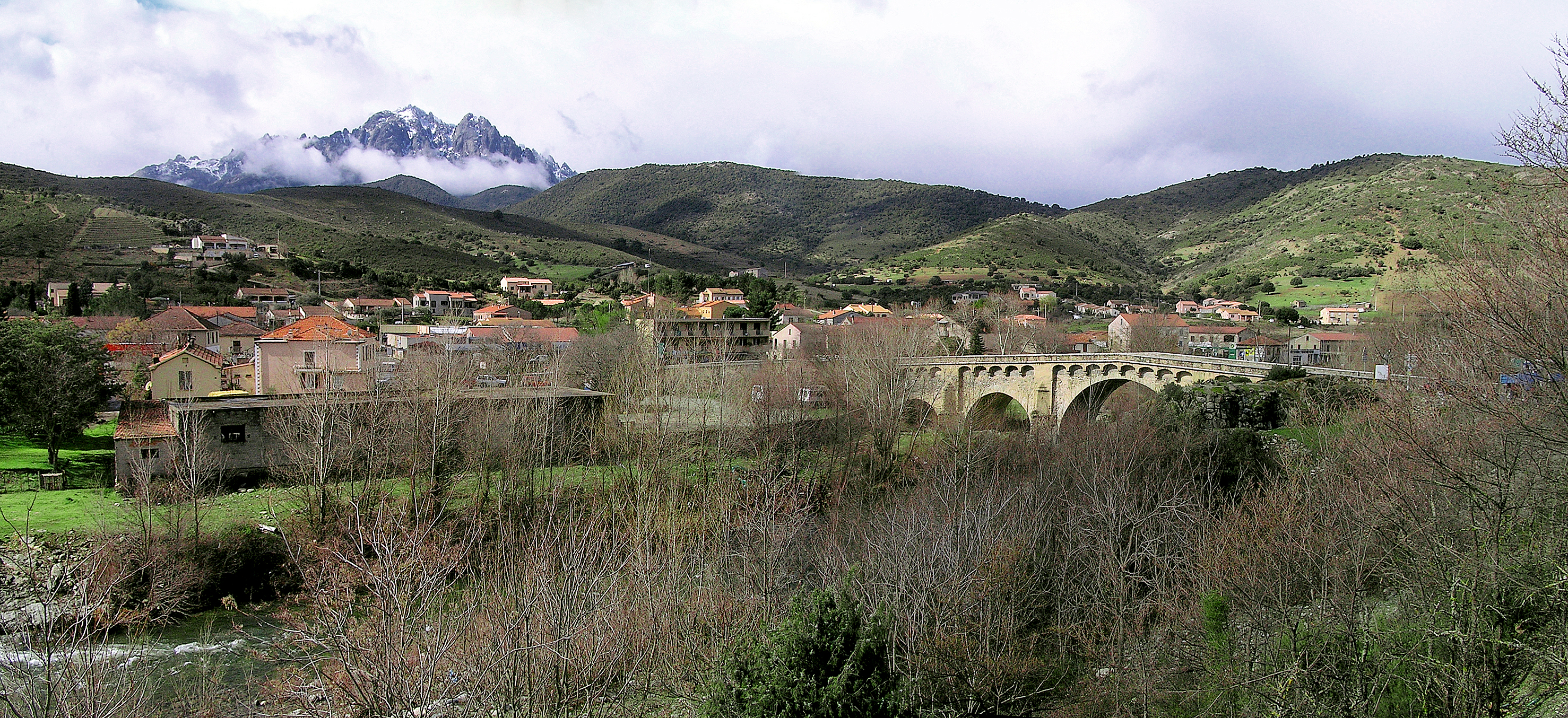

- Locator map of Ponte Leccia in France
- Coordinates: 42°26′10″N 9°18′1″E
- Country: France
- Region: Corsica
- Department: Haute-Corse
- Arrondissement: Corte
- Canton: Golo-Morosaglia
- Municipality: Morosaglia

Population (2001)
  - Total: 1,100
- Time zone: UTC+1 (CET)
  - Summer (DST): UTC+2 (CEST)
- Postal code: 20218
- Area code: (+33) ...

Ponte Leccia (French pronunciation: [pɔ̃te lɛtʃ(j)a]; or Ponte-Leccia) is a French village, part of the municipality (commune) of Morosaglia, in the department of Haute-Corse, Corsica. Its name in Corsican language is U Ponte à a Leccia.

== Geography ==
Situated at the confluence between Asco and Golo rivers, it lies few km in the east of Morosaglia and is 28 kilometres (17 miles) far from Corte, 46 from Bastia, 60 from Calvi and 100 from Ajaccio.

== Transport ==
Ponte Leccia has a railway station on the CFC line Ajaccio-Bastia, on the junction point with the line to Calvi. It is crossed by the national roads N193 and N197.

It has been used as a special stage in the Tour de Corse.

== Gallery ==
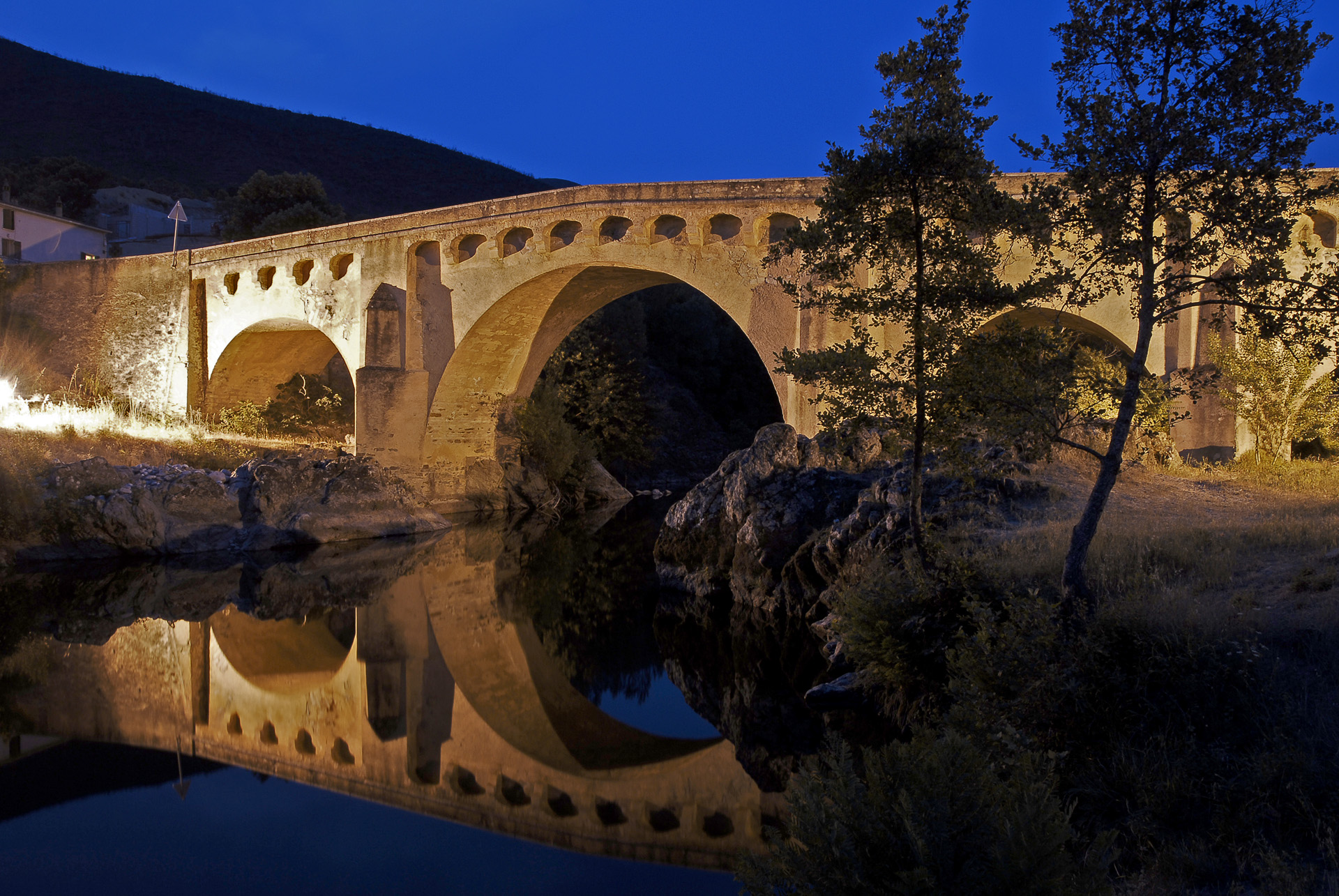
The "Genoese Bridge"

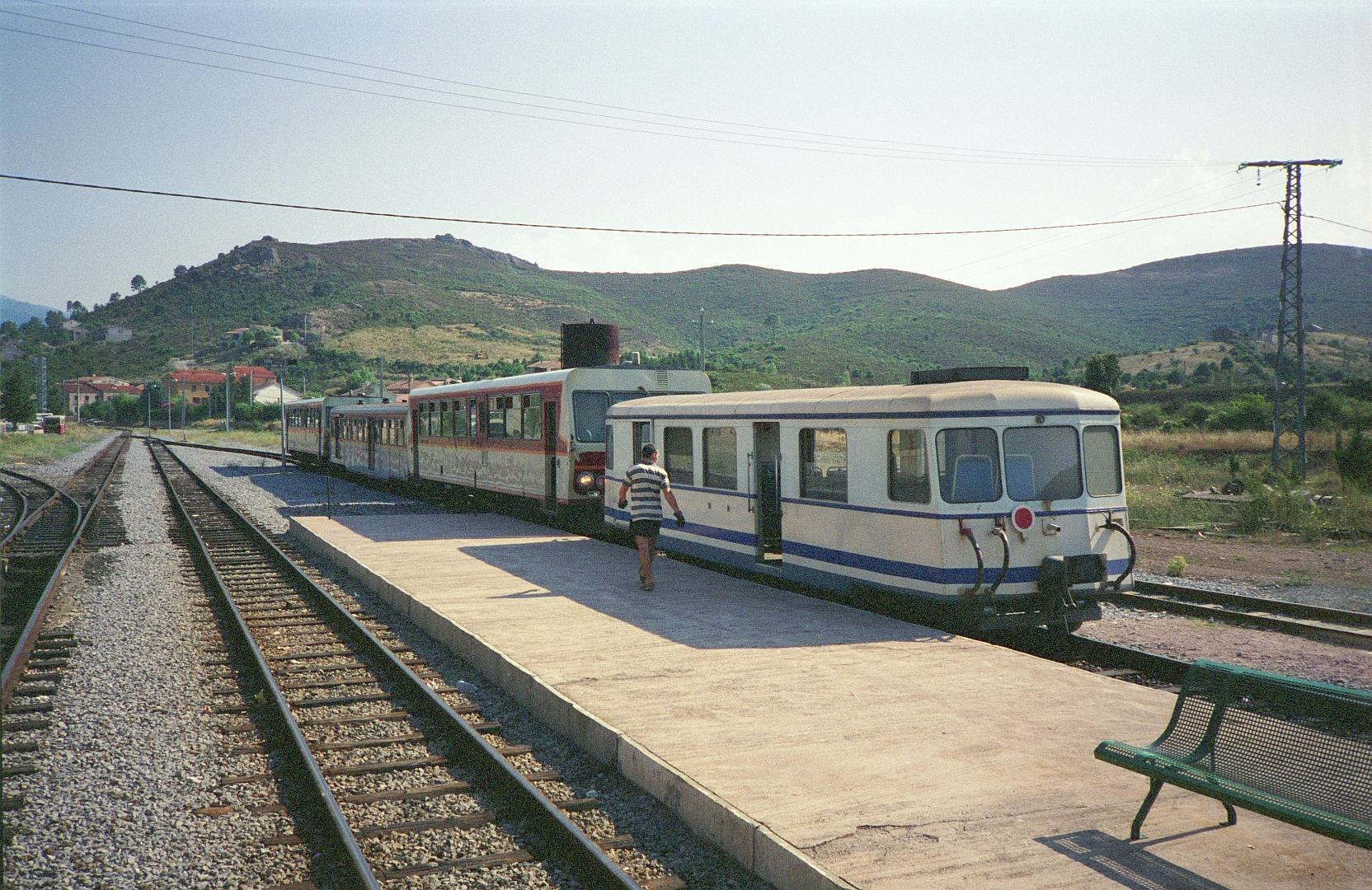
Railway station in 1994

== See also ==
- Corsican people
