= Monte Cinto =

Highest mountain on the island of Corsica

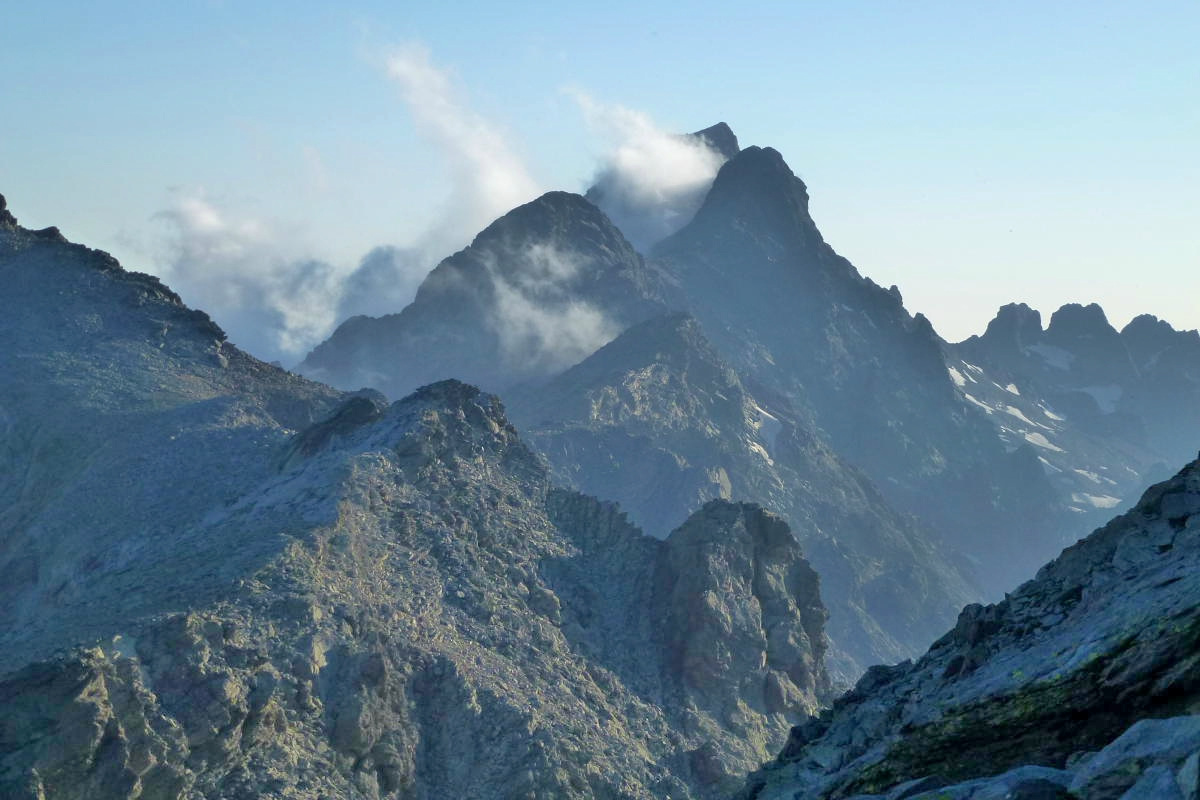
- Monte Cinto from Capu Biancu (2,562 m)

Highest point
- Elevation: 2,706 m (8,878 ft)
- Prominence: 2,706 m (8,878 ft)
- Isolation: 223.28 km (138.74 mi)
- Listing: Island high point 35th Ultra
- Coordinates: 42°22′47″N 8°56′45″E

Geography
- Location within Corsica
- Location: Corsica, France

Monte Cinto (Corsican: Monte Cintu) is the highest mountain on the island of Corsica, a region of France.

== Geography ==
The elevation of the mountain is 2,706 metres (8,878 ft) and so is its prominence, making it one of the most prominent peaks in Europe. It is the highest peak of the Monte Cinto Massif, one of the four main massifs in Corsica.

Its location gives it a theoretical panorama of mountains on mainland Europe stretching from near Marseille to Rome. The most distant mountain theoretically visible is Monte Rosa in Italy, just west of north, approximately 405 km (252 mi) away.

== History ==
The first known ascent of Monte Cinto was on 6 June 1882, by a party led by Édouard Rochat who reached the summit via the mountain's southern slopes. On 26 May 1883 a party led by the English mountaineer Francis Fox Tuckett, and including the French guide François Devouassoud and the landscape painter Edward Theodore Compton, also ascended the mountain by the pass that now bears Tuckett's name.

Today, the GR 20 hiking trail passes close to Monte Cinto, and walkers can make a short detour to the summit.

== See also ==
- List of European ultra prominent peaks
- List of islands by highest point
