= Moltifao =

- Commune
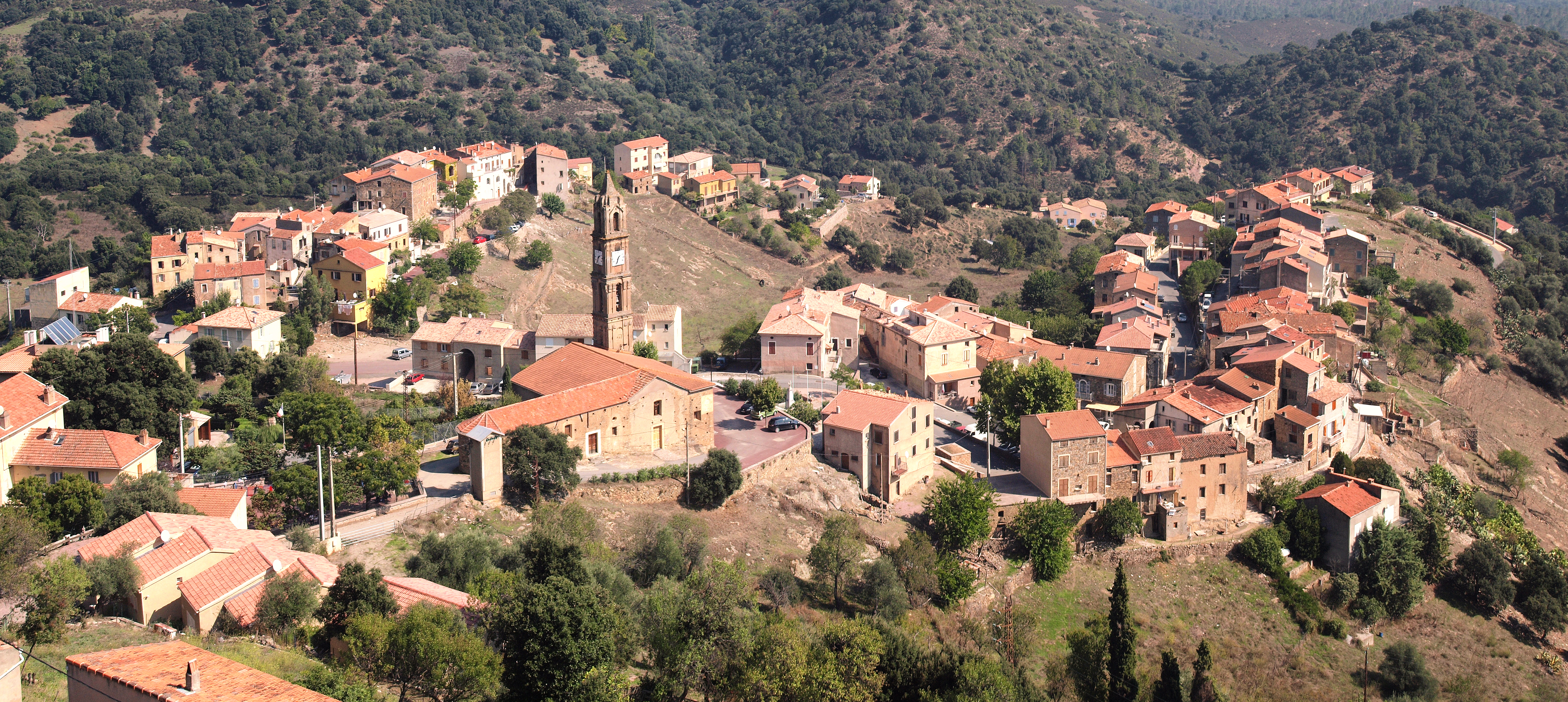
- A panoramic view of Moltifao
- Location of Moltifao
- Location within France Location within Corsica
- Coordinates: 42°29′15″N 9°06′52″E
- Country: France
- Region: Corsica
- Department: Haute-Corse
- Arrondissement: Corte
- Canton: Golo-Morosaglia

Government
  - Mayor (2020–2026): Jacques Costa
- Area^{1}: 55.19 km^{2} (21.31 sq mi)
- Elevation: 400 m (1,300 ft)
- Highest elevation: 2,064 m (6,772 ft)
- Lowest elevation: 200 m (660 ft)
- Population (2023): 735
  - Density: 13.3/km^{2} (34.5/sq mi)
- Time zone: UTC+01:00 (CET)
  - Summer (DST): UTC+02:00 (CEST)
- INSEE/Postal code: 2B162 /20218
- ^{1} French Land Register data, which excludes lakes, ponds, glaciers > 1 km^{2} (0.386 sq mi or 247 acres) and river estuaries.

Moltifao (French pronunciation: [mɔltifao]; Corsican: Moltifau) is a commune in the Haute-Corse department of France on the island of Corsica.

== Population ==
Historical population
Year	Pop.	±% p.a.
1968	437	—
1975	383	−1.87%
1982	434	+1.80%
1990	427	−0.20%
1999	549	+2.83%
2007	682	+2.75%
2012	734	+1.48%
2017	682	−1.46%
2023	735	+1.26%
Source: INSEE

== See also ==
- Communes of the Haute-Corse department
