= David Berkeley =

American singer-songwriter

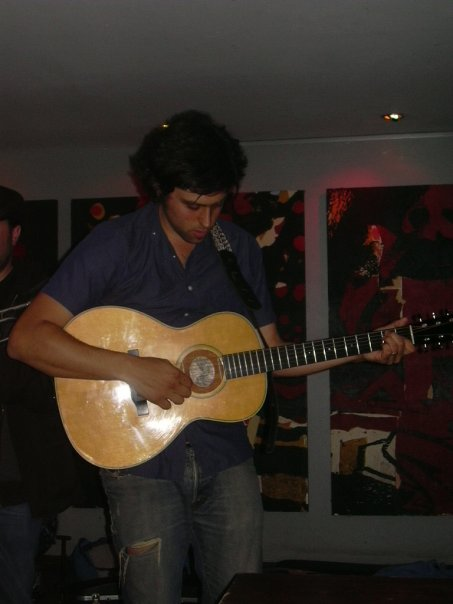
- David Berkeley live at Bloc, Glasgow, June 2009

Background information
- Born: David Berkeley Friedland; 22 September 1976 (age 50); New Jersey, United States
- Genres: Acoustic, indie, Americana
- Instruments: Vocals, guitar
- Years active: 2002–present
- Label: Straw Man
- Website: www.davidberkeley.com

David Berkeley (born David Berkeley Friedland, September 22, 1976) is an American singer and songwriter.

He has released eight studio albums, one live album and has published two books, all of them self-produced under the Straw Man label, in a recording career that began in 2002.

Berkeley accompanies his singing on acoustic guitar, solo or with supporting instruments; his music has been described as acoustic, indie and Americana. He is also known for collaborating with trance music artists on remixes of his own songs and on original material.

After growing up in his native New Jersey and graduating from Harvard he has lived in several areas of the United States working as a tour guide, a travel writer and a teacher among other employments. After the starting of his career as a professional musician he moved first to Atlanta and then to Tralonca, a small village in Corsica. He now resides in Santa Fe, New Mexico. The places he lived in are a strong inspiration for his songwriting, as are the people in his family (his parents, his wife and his two children).

== Biography ==
David Berkeley was born David Berkeley Friedland in September, 1976. His parents gave him the middle name Berkeley—which he later picked as his stage name—after having been graduate students at the University of California-Berkeley in the early 1970s before they moved to New Jersey.

David started showing a passion for singing while still in nursery school, having attended a musical school. Because of this he had his first experience of singing on stage at the age of three or four. Also when he was four, the woman taking care of him was an Avon saleswoman; she would bring him with her while going door to door, and he would sing to her potential customers. In an interview he credits receiving cookies and applause for singing "that song about the Titanic sinking" (likely "The Titanic") as an early experience of positive feedback. His parents helped him nurture his passion for music by taking him to several Broadway shows, and was usually selected as the leading vocalist in high school musicals. Initially he played tuba, and did not start to play guitar until the age of 15 when he would perform songs by Neil Young, Crosby, Stills & Nash and Grateful Dead "mostly to get girls".

He graduated from Harvard with degrees in literature and philosophy. During his time there he used to busk in Harvard Square; in the same period he started writing songs "to win (his) girlfriend back".

David Berkeley lived in Alaska, where he contributed to the Let's Go Alaska travel guide; Idaho, where he was a river-rafting guide; Santa Fe, where he worked for Outside magazine; Santa Cruz; Brooklyn (New York City), teaching creative writing in a public school in an impoverished area; Atlanta and Tralonca, a small village in Corsica, while his wife worked on her PhD in anthropology.

While living in Santa Fe, David Berkeley managed a local band. This, in his own words, got him "excited about the music business". It was only after this band broke up that he decided to record his own music.

He decided to become a full-time musician while he was teaching in Brooklyn, as having a double career was taking its toll on his voice and his private life.

He presently lives in Santa Fe, New Mexico with his wife Sarah and sons Jackson and Noah.

== Recording career ==
=== The Confluence ===
His debut came in 2002 with the mostly acoustic The Confluence, in which David Berkeley already displayed the characteristic traits that still identify his style: elaborated lyrics about personal topics, complex song construction, varying chord patterns.

=== After the Wrecking Ships ===
In 2004, Berkeley released his second album, After the Wrecking Ships, in which he made use of more electric instruments but still without abandoning the genre that he defines "acoustic/indie/alt/folk/whatever-you-want-to-add-here". It sold over 10,000 copies.

This album includes "Fire Sign", written for an episode (Wannabe) of the second season of CBS-TV's Without a Trace and produced by Will Robertson. Although there are sources saying that the same song has also been used in the CSI: Crime Scene Investigation episode A Thousand Days on Earth, this appears not to be true.

=== Live from Fez ===
In 2005, David Berkeley released Live from Fez, the testimony of a live event held on February 22 of the same year, one of the last concerts held at the popular Lower Manhattan club. Along with the CD is a DVD including four songs recorded in the same occasion. This live release displays not only David Berkeley's heartfelt musical style, but also his sense of humor in the intermissions between songs.

David Berkeley claims that this is the only live album ever released to be recorded at the now-closed New York club however, in 2004, Bree Sharp had released an album also recorded at the club, entitled Live at Fez.

=== Strange Light ===
2006 saw David Berkeley working at the Engine Studios in Chicago to record his third studio album, Strange Light, that would not be released until 2009. This delay allowed his fans and some reviewers to compare it – tongue-in-cheek – with Guns N' Roses's Chinese Democracy. When released, the album was enriched by the production of Brian Deck (Counting Crows, Modest Mouse, Iron and Wine, Josh Ritter). Its style has been judged affirming and intriguing even though downtrodden and melancholic.

=== Some Kind of Cure ===
In late 2009, David Berkeley announced on his website and through his mailing list that he was working on a new album called Some Kind of Cure, mostly written while living in Corsica where, in his own words, he had the chance to listen to whatever surrounded him and take in the silence around.

As has been done more or less successfully in the past by other bands or artists (among which Marillion, Public Enemy and Jill Sobule), David Berkeley asked for his fans' contribution for the production of the record; the experiment was successful.

The album was released on January 25, 2011, and is accompanied by a book written by Berkeley himself and entitled 140 Goats & a Guitar, telling the stories behind the inspiration for each song in the album.

In this album Berkeley is accompanied among others by Peter Bradley Adams of Eastmountainsouth on piano, Kim Taylor of Over the Rhine on background vocals and by long-term collaborator Jordan Katz of Common Rotation on horns and banjo; it was produced by long-term collaborator Will Robertson, who had also produced the song "Fire Sign" included in After the Wrecking Ships and has also worked with Shawn Mullins, Clay Cook, Pat Sansone and Peter Ostroushko. Robertson also played bass and keyboards on the album.

Some Kind of Cure features much more electric guitar than Berkeley's previous works, alongside the church bells of Tralonca and a Corsican choir.

"George Square", the first single from the album, has been made available for download several weeks before the release of the record. Besides twelve original songs, Some Kind of Cure includes David Berkeley's version of "Shenandoah".

=== Fire in My Head ===
David Berkeley released in 2013 Fire in My Head, recorded in only a few weeks with the help and the production of Jono Manson (who, besides releasing several album with his own band, worked with Blues Traveler and Donald Rubinstein among others and appeared at Pete Seeger's 90th birthday celebration) and accompanied once again by Jordan Katz and Bill Titus.

It has also been released, for the first time in Berkeley's discography, on vinyl.

=== Other recordings ===
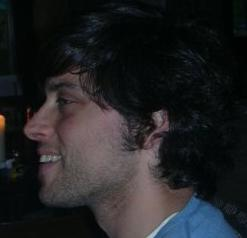
David Berkeley in Glasgow (June 2009)

David Berkeley also recorded a song ("Love's the Only Thing That Shuts Me Up") for Ciao My Shining Star, a tribute album to Mark Mulcahy (the former vocalist of Miracle Legion) that features contributions from Mark Mulcahy's favourite musicians. Besides David, other artists featured are Thom Yorke of Radiohead, Michael Stipe of R.E.M. and J Mascis of Dinosaur Jr. The album was released on September 29, 2009, and David Berkeley's contribution has been widely appreciated. He also took part in the benefit live concert that followed that album, held in Williamsburg, Brooklyn.

During his stay in Corsica, David Berkeley took part to the recording of a cover version of Leonard Cohen's "Hallelujah" with local artists which has not been released yet.

"Fire Sign" from After the Wrecking Ships has been remixed by Steve Brian into an electronica trance track and released in September 2010 by Enhanced under the name of "Agulo feat. David Berkeley", which is reported to have been a dancefloor favourite of renowned DJs such as Tiësto and Sean Tyas. Further versions of the same track have been created by Will Holland, in a bigroom progressive style, and by Freigeist. The Steve Brian version was included in Enhanced's Best of 2010 iTunes compilation after listeners voted it as one of the best 25 releases of the year by that label.

David Berkeley gave his voice for a second progressive house track called "Vueltas" created by the same Steve Brian who had worked on the dance version of "Fire Sign" and is rumored to be collaborating with other dance artists in creating new music to which he'd add his vocals. In early 2014, he also contributed vocal parts to a song on the album "Field Studies" by Ben Cosgrove, a composer and multi-instrumentalist.

More recently in 2018 David Berkeley has had one of his songs "The Faded Red and Blue" remixed while teaming up with Steve Brianwhich. This song while deeply political relates to the "faded red and blue flag of the USA missing a star or two" and focuses on the immigration issues (political issues) which the USA faces at the current time.

== Literary career ==
=== 140 Goats and a Guitar ===
David Berkeley published a book called 140 Goats & a Guitar through his own Straw Man label. It was released in January 2011 as a companion book to his fourth studio album Some Kind of Cure and tells the inspiration behind each song in the album through short stories based on real-life events. Berkeley made clear that such tales are not to be considered synopses of the songs, but simple aids to better understand them.

== Inspiration ==
In an interview, David Berkeley mentioned as his influences Paul Simon for the lyrics, Nick Drake for the mood, and then Neil Young, The Band, Elliott Smith and Jerry Garcia of the Grateful Dead. He also admitted to be inspired by hip hop artist Brother Ali and indie rockers The Hold Steady. He insists, however, that most of his inspiration derives from poetry (he is especially fond of Yeats and Keats's Ode on a Grecian Urn is heavily quoted in "A Moon Song" from The Confluence), passages of prose, people (his parents and his wife and sons especially), the outdoors, art and most form of visual images. He admits to have at least once chosen the topic of a song because a friend pressured him into it.

David Berkeley has a penchant for using geography-related references as song titles. Among them "Leaving Idaho" from The Confluence; "Jefferson", "Times Square", "Chicago" and "Bushwick" from After the Wrecking Ships; "Willis Avenue Bridge", "Sweet Auburn" and "Milwaukee Road" from Strange Light, "George Square" from Some Kind of Cure.

== Live career ==
In 2003, David Berkeley showcased at the popular South by Southwest festival in Austin, Texas, where he returned in 2004 and 2011. He also toured the United States and supported such artists as Ben Folds, Rhett Miller and Ed Harcourt.

In 2006, he participated in the Jeep Compass Summer Music Tour.

In early 2007, David Berkeley toured the United Kingdom for the first time, alongside Ben Parker. He returned to the UK at the end of the same year with Common Rotation.

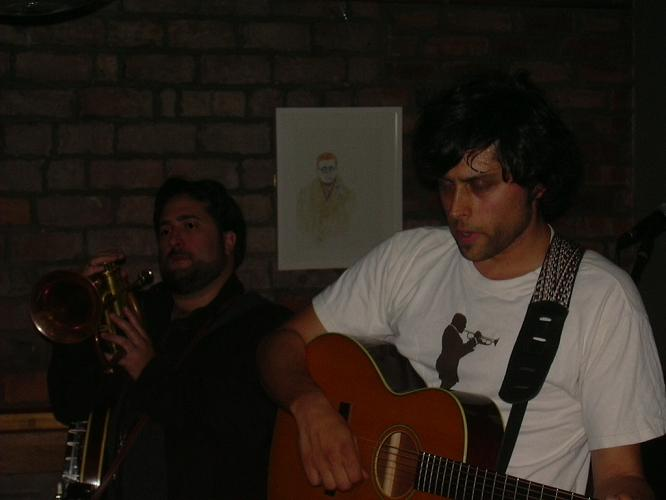
David Berkeley and Jordan Katz (of Common Rotation) live at The Drawing Room, Glasgow (June 2009)

After having spent most of 2008 in Corsica with his family keeping his musical profile low, in 2009 after the release of Strange Light David Berkeley toured with Katie Melua accompanied by Jordan Katz of Common Rotation. With Katz, he also toured once more the United Kingdom.

In 2010 he was a finalist in the Mountain Stage Newsong Contest after having been one of the two winners of the "Early Bird" stage alongside Rebecca Jordan. The contest was eventually won by Amber Rubarth.

Following the release of Some Kind of Cure, David Berkeley is touring the United States in what he called Some Kind of Tour. It is not a long tour but a series of small tours with breaks that allow him to return to California to spend time with his family. It also features readings from his new book.

He has appeared on Ira Glass's This American Life. He mentioned this experience as the proudest moment of his career so far.

Besides the artists already mentioned, David Berkeley has toured with Billy Bragg, Don McLean, Nickel Creek, Rufus Wainwright, Ray Lamontagne, Howie Day, Gary Jules, Dido, Vienna Teng, Joseph Arthur, Hem, Mason Jennings and Ben Lee.

David Berkeley's live concerts, both those with a full band and the solo ones (not to mention the dates in which he has performed in duo with Jordan Katz), have been praised for their gentleness and richness. Between songs he uses to tell short anecdotes usually extremely funny, witty and erudite.

=== The ATL Collective ===
In July 2009, David Berkeley, then living in Atlanta, announced the formation of the "ATL Collective" (not to be confused with the "Atlanta Collective", a similar project focused on blues) featuring himself, Micah Dalton and Samantha Murphy. Their intention was to gather as many musicians from Atlanta as possible once a month, on a Wednesday, in a café in the Old Fourth Ward area to cover whole classic albums. On their debut the three artists, accompanied by other local musicians, covered the whole Bob Dylan album Blood on the Tracks. The second album covered has been Rumours by Fleetwood Mac. Other albums played were At Folsom Prison by Johnny Cash and Sgt. Pepper's Lonely Hearts Club Band by The Beatles.

== Critical appreciation ==
David Berkeley's debut album, The Confluence, received very positive reviews that compared him to such great artists in his field such as Donovan and Nick Drake. His tenor voice has been defined by some reviewer so hypnotizing that he "could easily spin tales of cleaning his bathroom, cleaning his catbox, or participating in any number of equally mundane or horrifying events", and this paired with honest, warm lyrics. Also appreciated were the orchestral arrangements backing up his music. His delivery has been defined delicate and tasteful, sober but not cheap, sweet and sour, his songs are considered rich in texture and poetic, and his voice confident and reassured.

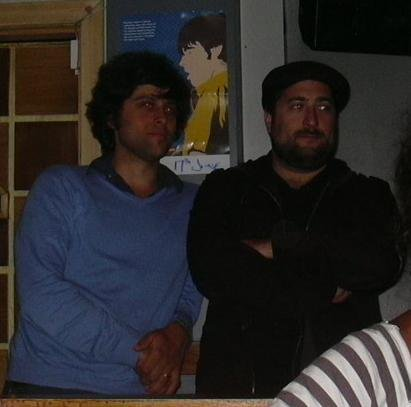
David Berkeley and Jordan Katz at Bloc, Glasgow (June 2009)

After the Wrecking Ships also gathered enthusiastic reviews and more comparisons to established artists, such as Wilco and Ryan Adams, and was chosen as the best album of 2004 by established Rolling Stone critic Rob O'Connor. The New York Times critic Jon Pareles showed his high appreciation for this album. The Pittsburgh Pulp defined David Berkeley one of the best examples in the resurgence of folk rock, praising the American taste of his songs along with his melodic and melancholy voice. The already mentioned Rob O'Connor, on Harp Magazine, noticed a superficial resemblance to the quieter side of Eddie Vedder paired with wanderlust and bravado, in the finest troubadour tradition. In the same year he was also officially recognized by ASCAP as one of the most important emerging songwriters in the United States.

To highlight David Berkeley's perception by the general public, it is interesting to notice that once he has been hired (and flown cross-country) to help a fan serenading his ex-girlfriend.

The song Red, included in this album, has been criticized by the people of Cleveland for depicting their town in a negative way; the only time he sang the song in Ohio, David Berkeley changed the reference in the lyrics to Pittsburgh.

Live from Fez was appreciated in its maturity and was reviewed as a good ensemble work, although some reviewers took exception at David Berkeley's on-stage habit, reflected in this album, to intersperse his setlist of quiet, warm songs with light-hearted banter.

Strange Light was also welcomed warmly by the critics adding to the list of artists David Berkeley has been compared to such influential names as James Taylor, Damien Rice, David Gray, Jackson Browne, Cat Stevens, Elliott Smith and Five for Fighting. This is the album, in some critics' opinion, that could give Berkeley "the big break". According to another critic, David Berkeley now is above comparisons and could be mentioned in the company (and could fit in the same period, the 1970s) of most of the artists he has been compared to. The passion and diversity of his lyrics and the poignancy of his music has also been widely praised, as has the emotional depth of his works. The originality and complexity of his arrangements have been positively highlighted.

Some Kind of Cure has been praised for its originality, even compared to Berkeley's previous albums, and from the range of influences the various songs seem to have been inspired to. Although the more rock songs have been judged less interesting than the rest of the album, Berkeley's skills as a lyricist and a storyteller have been once again praised, and the texture of the songs have been called "subtle" with the lyrics mentioned as "thoughtful but not self-indulgent". His gift of describing reality under other people's point of views is considered exceptional, allowing his songs to paint reality from different perspectives.

It has been judged the best album Berkeley has released yet thanks to the warmth of the melodies and the soul he seems to have poured in it, although some judged it too measured and not emotional enough. This record suggested comparisons with Steve Reynolds, Josh Ritter, Eastmountainsouth, Rosie Thomas, Ray LaMontagne, Ben Gibbard of Death Cab for Cutie, Joseph Arthur, Dan Fogelberg and John Denver.

The Boston Phoenix defined him "the best of the young American songwriters, a voice full of feeling and a big, big heart. And the balls to say what he thinks".

== Discography ==
=== Studio albums ===
- 2002 – The Confluence
- 2004 – After the Wrecking Ships
- 2005 – Live from Fez
- 2009 – Strange Light
- 2011 – Some Kind of Cure
- 2013 – Fire in My Head
- 2015 – Cardboard Boat
- 2020 – Oh Quiet World

=== Collaborations ===
| Year | Song | Original artist |
|---|---|---|
2010
| 2010 | "Fire Sign (Steve Brian's Original Mix)" | Agulo, David Berkeley |
| 2010 | "Vueltas" | Steve Brian, David Berkeley |
2011
| 2011 | "Believe feat. David Berkeley" | Sean Tyas |
2012
| 2012 | "George Square (Original Mix) | Steve Brian, David Berkeley |
| 2012 | "Take My Hand feat. David Berkeley" | Sean Tyas |
| 2012 | "Blood & The Wine (Original Mix) | Agulo, David Berkeley |
| 2012 | "Sail On The Waves feat. David Berkeley" | Walsh, McAuley |
2013
| 2013 | "Fallen For You (Original Mix) | Steve Brian, David Berkeley |

== Bibliography ==
- 2011 – 140 Goats and a Guitar
