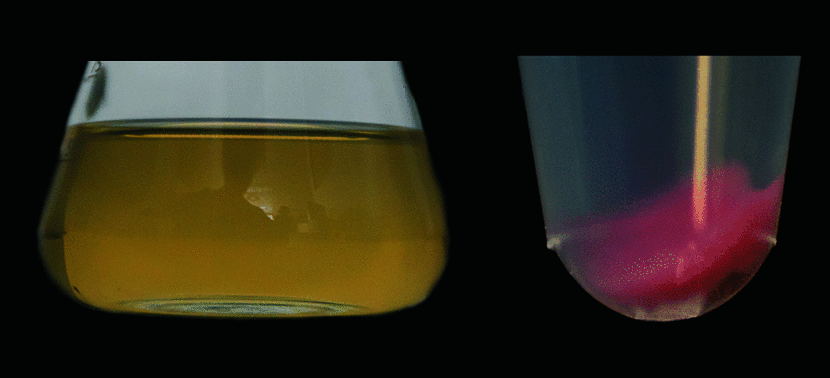

Scientific classification
- Domain: Bacteria
- Kingdom: Pseudomonadati
- Phylum: Pseudomonadota
- Class: Betaproteobacteria
- Order: Burkholderiales
- Family: Burkholderiaceae
- Genus: Polynucleobacter
- Species: P. meluiroseus

Binomial name
- Polynucleobacter meluiroseus Pitt et al. 2018

Type strain
- AP-Melu-1000-B4 = DSM 103591 = CIP 111329

Synonyms
- Polynucleobacter necessarius subsp. asymbioticus, Polynucleobacter sp. AP-Melu-1000-B4

= Polynucleobacter meluiroseus =

Species of bacterium

Polynucleobacter meluiroseus is an aerobic, chemo-organotrophic, non-motile, free-living bacterium of the genus Polynucleobacter.

The type strain was isolated from the mountain lake (1,710 meters) Lac de Melu located in the Restonica Valley on the Mediterranean island Corsica, France near to the commune of Corte. The type strain of P. meluiroseus is remarkable because of its unusual pigmentation compared to other Polynucleobacter strains, as well as due to the presence of a Proteorhodopsin gene in the genome of the strain. Furthermore, the 16S rRNA gene of the type strain contains an unusual indel previously only known from uncultured Polynucleobacter strains detected by cultivation-independent methods in mountain lakes located in the Pyrenees. The type strain dwells as a free-living, planktonic bacterium in the water column of the lake, thus is part of freshwater bacterioplankton. The complete genome sequence of the type strain was determined.
