= Monte Rotondo =

Mountain in Corsica, France

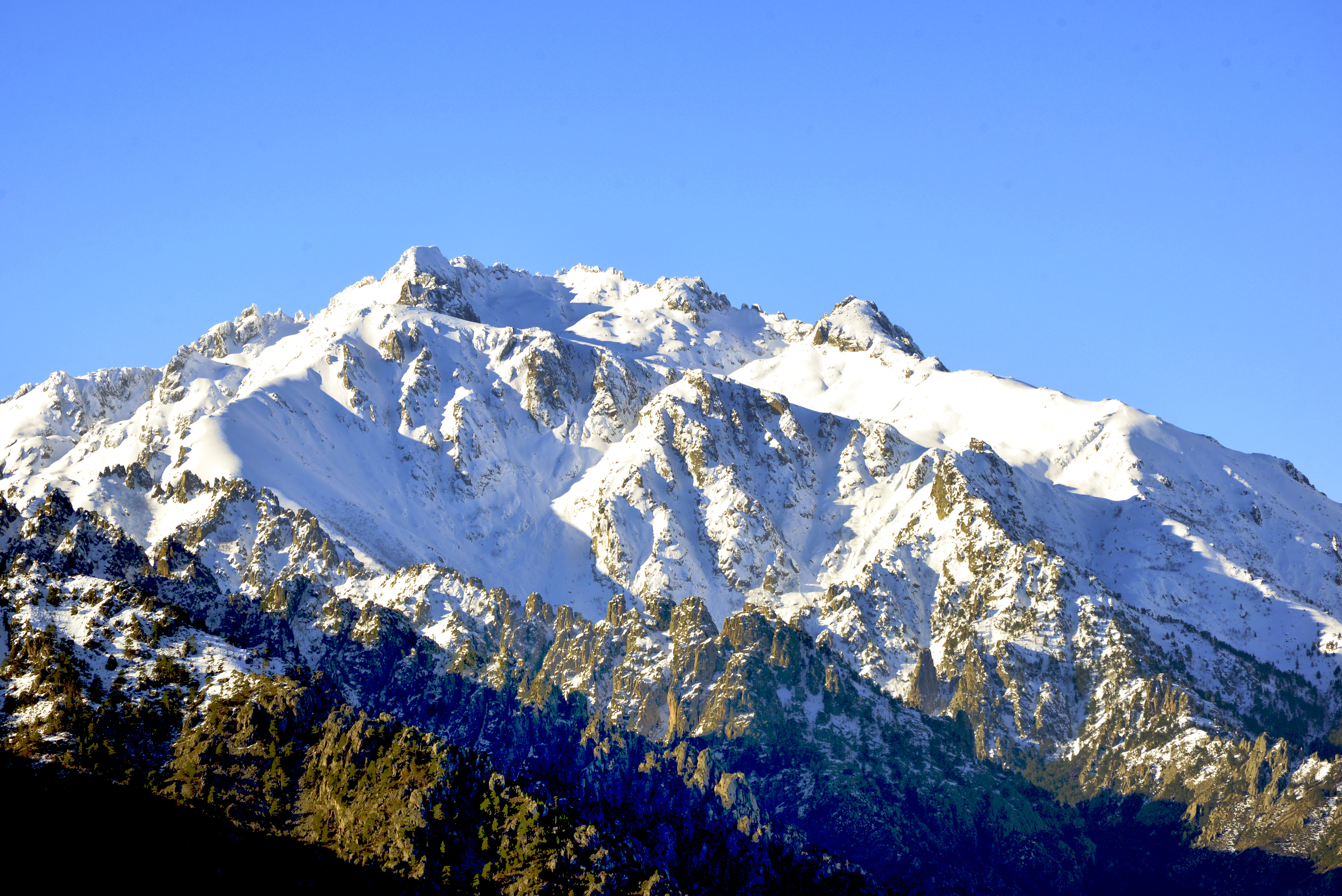
- Monte Rotondo seen from Tralonca

Highest point
- Elevation: 2,622 m (8,602 ft)
- Prominence: 1,170 m (3,840 ft)
- Isolation: 20.31 km (12.62 mi)
- Listing: Ribu
- Coordinates: 42°12′58″N 09°03′29″E

Geography
- Location within Corsica
- Country: France
- Department: Haute-Corse
- Parent range: Monte Rotondo Massif

Monte Rotondo (Corsican: Monte Ritondu) is a mountain in the department of Haute-Corse on the island of Corsica, France. At 2,622 metres (8,602 ft) it is the second highest in Corsica, after Monte Cinto. It is the highest point on the Monte Rotondo Massif.

== Location ==
The peak of Monte Rotondo lies on the boundary between the commune of Corte to the north and east and Venaco to the south and west. It is east of the 2,590 metres (8,500 ft) Punta Mufrena and northeast of Lac de Battomello. The mountain lies within and gives its name to the Réserve naturelle du Massif du Monte Ritondu.

== Physical ==
Monte Rotondo has an elevation of 2,622 metres (8,602 ft) and clean prominence of 1,170 metres (3,840 ft). It is isolated by 20.31 kilometres (12.62 mi) from its nearest higher neighbor, Monte Cinto.

== Hiking ==
A hiking trail to Monte Rotondo from the D623 road is rated moderate, and is in best condition from April to October. The return trip is 11.9 kilometres (7.4 mi) long, with an elevation gain of 1,510 metres (4,950 ft). The hike is easy but long, and requires good physical condition. The trail passes the Lac de l'Oriente. It passes through a pine forest, maquis shrubland and over bare rocks. The view from the summit gives a panorama of Corsica, including Cap Corse to the north, Monte Cinto and Paglia Orba just opposite, Monte d'Oro, Monte Renoso, and Monte Incudine to the south, with the sea on the east and west sides of the island.

== Gallery ==
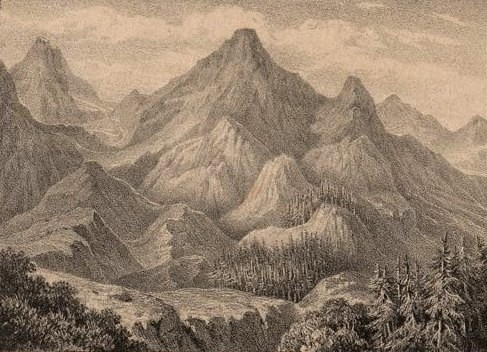
Monte Rotundu from Galletti's Histoire illustrée de la Corse (1863)

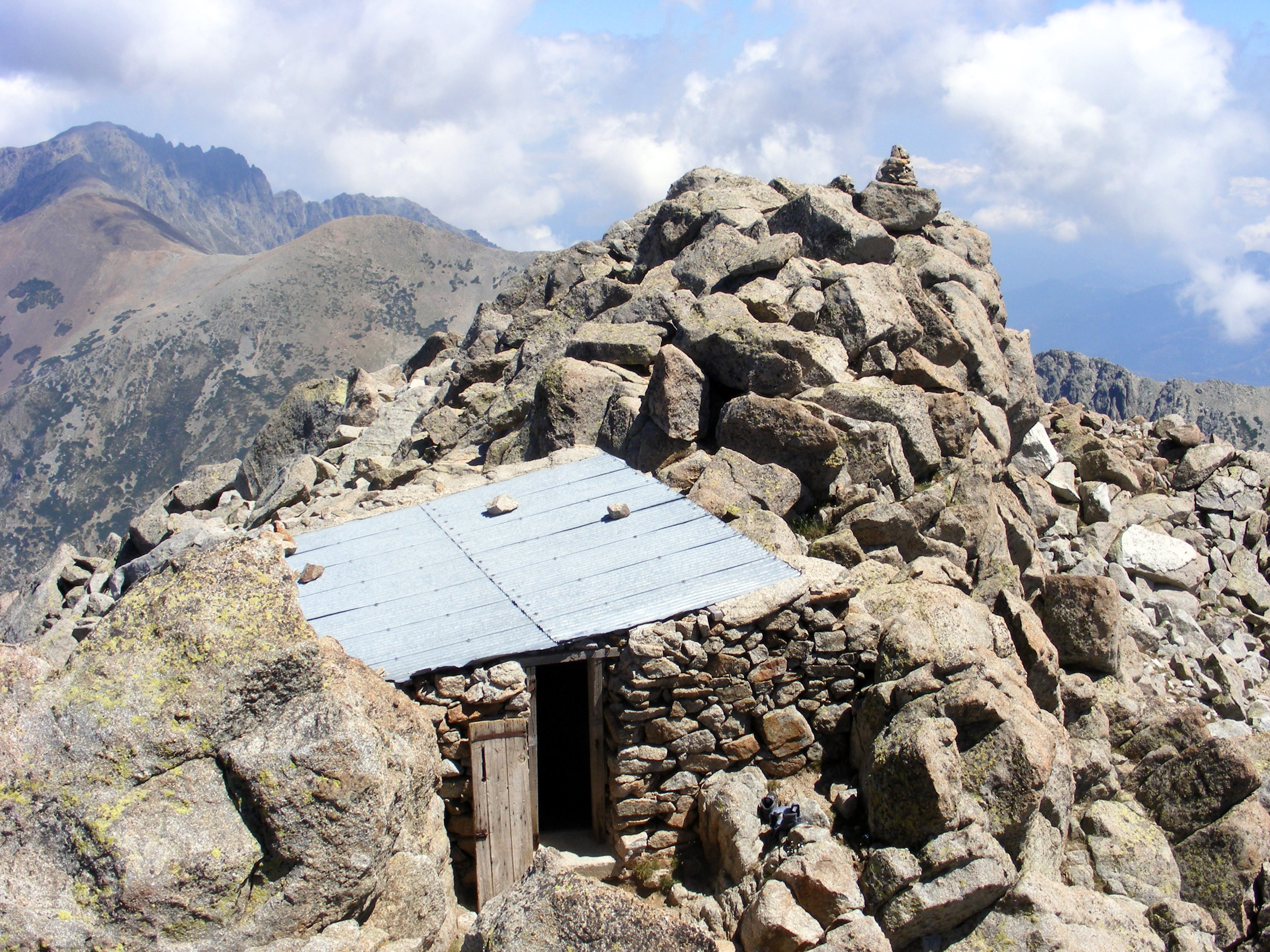
Cabin on the summit of Monte Rotondo

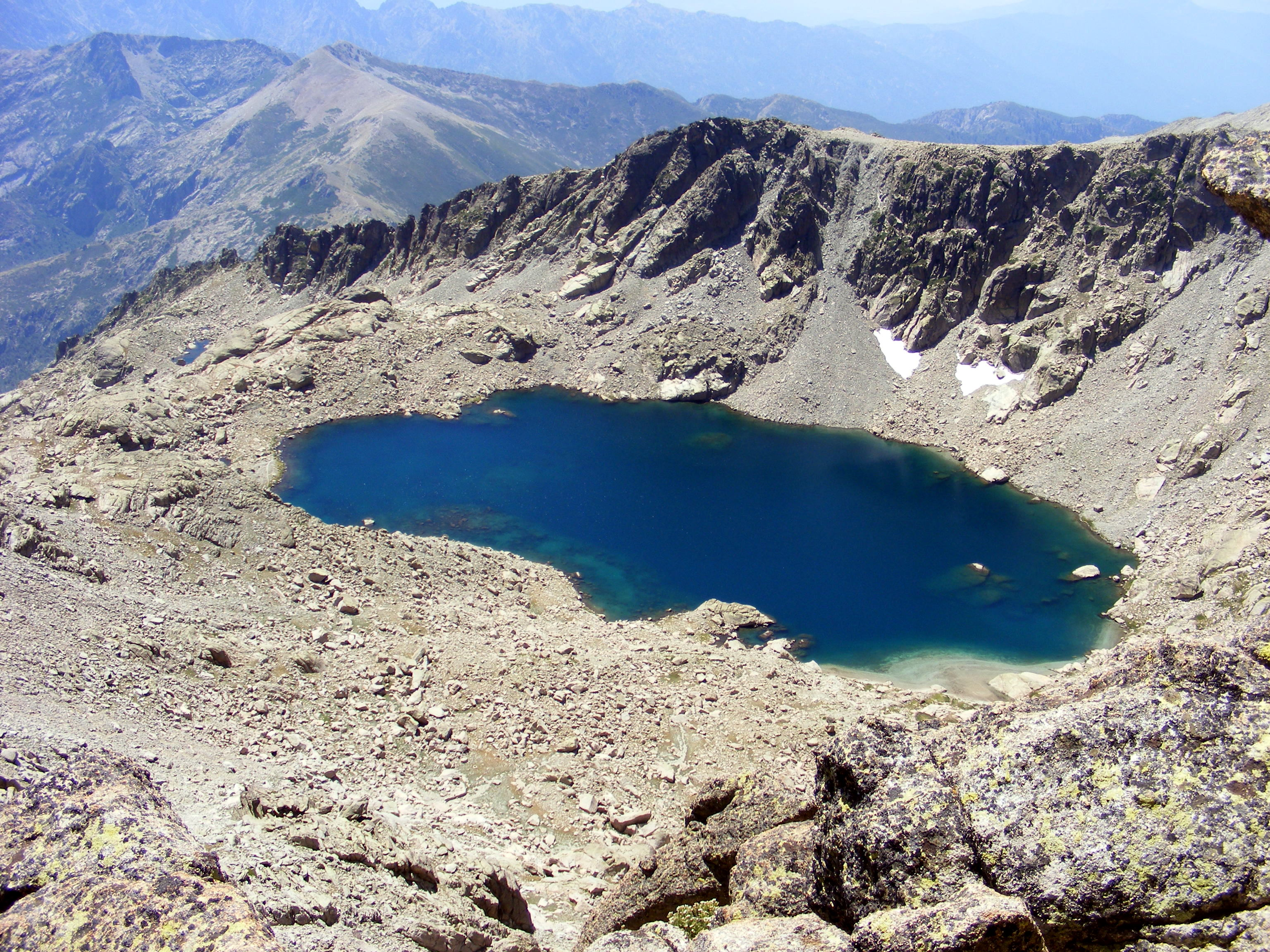
Lac du Rotondo

== See also ==
- Lake Revelli

== Sources ==
- Le Lac de l'Oriente - Monte Rotondu (in French), Office de Tourisme de Corte, 2013
- "Le Monte Rotondo (2622m)", Altituderando (in French)
- "Monte Rotondo", AllTrails
- "Monte Rotondo, France", Peakbagger
- "Node: Monte Rotondo (26863955)", OpenStreetMap
