= Restonica =

Small river in Corsica, France

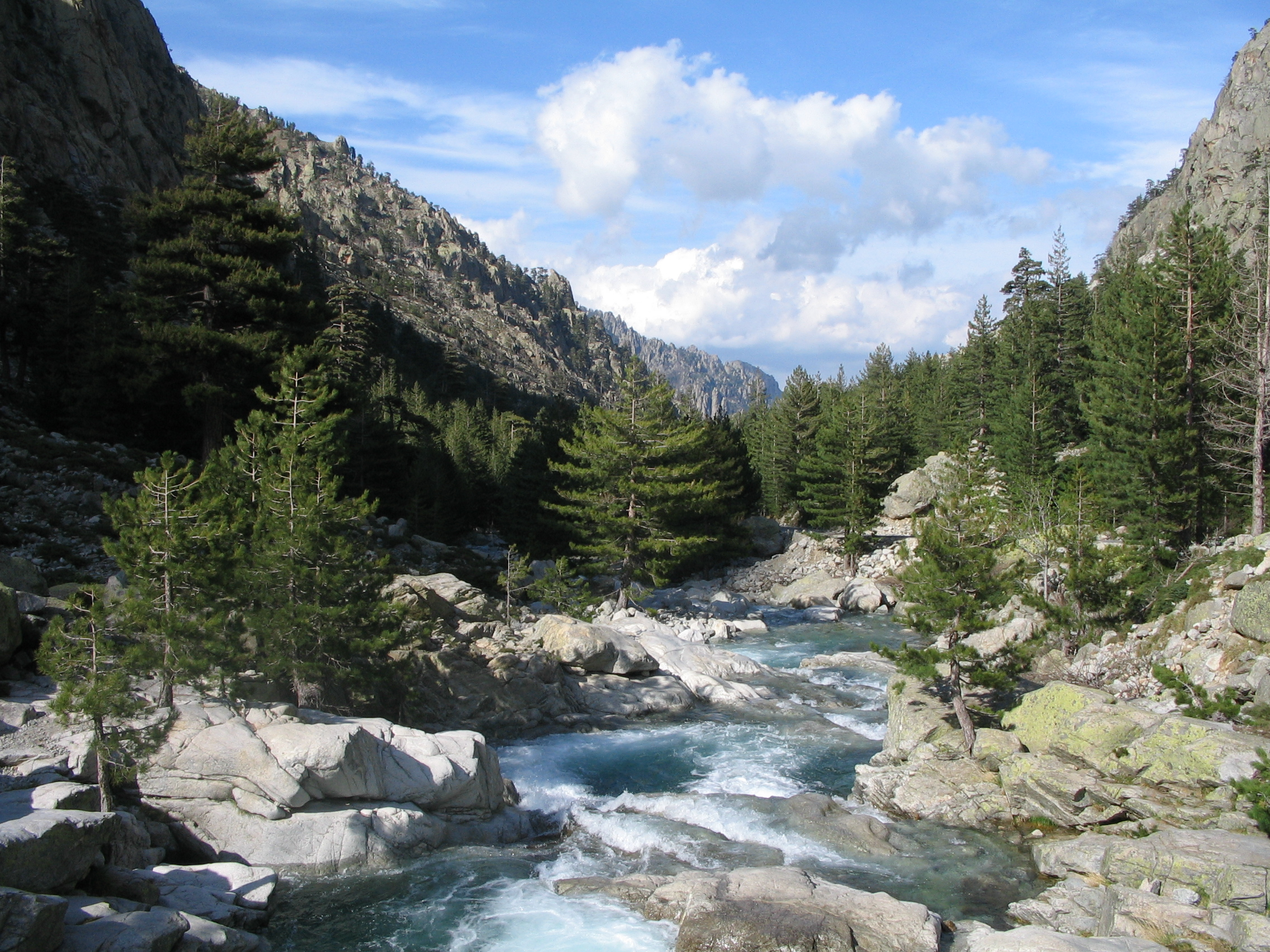
- Restonica river

- Location within Corsica Location within France

Location
- Country: France
- Region: Corsica
- Department: Haute-Corse
- Canton: Corte

Physical characteristics
- Mouth: Tavignano
  - location: Corte
  - coordinates: 42°18′14″N 9°09′12″E

Basin features
- Progression: Tavignano→ Tyrrhenian Sea

The Restonica is a small river in the department of Haute-Corse, Corsica, France. It is a tributary of the river Tavignano. The river has a steep and rocky course with many pools and waterfalls. The valley contains two lakes, and is a popular tourist destination.

== Course ==
The Restonica is 17.79 kilometres (11.05 mi) long. It rises to the north of the 2,342 metres (7,684 ft) Punta Muzzella in the canton of Corte. It originates in the Lac de Melu. The river continues in a northeast direction to join the Tavignano in the town of Corte. The Lac de l'Oriente to the north of the 2,622 metres (8,602 ft) Monte Rotondo, drains through the Ruisseau de Lamento or Timozzo, a tributary of the Restonica. The small Lac de Pozzolo to the east of Monte Rotondo drains through the Ruisseau de Pozzolo, a tributary of the Ruisseau de Rivesecco, another tributary of the Restonica. The D623 road follows the river for most of its course.

== Tourism ==
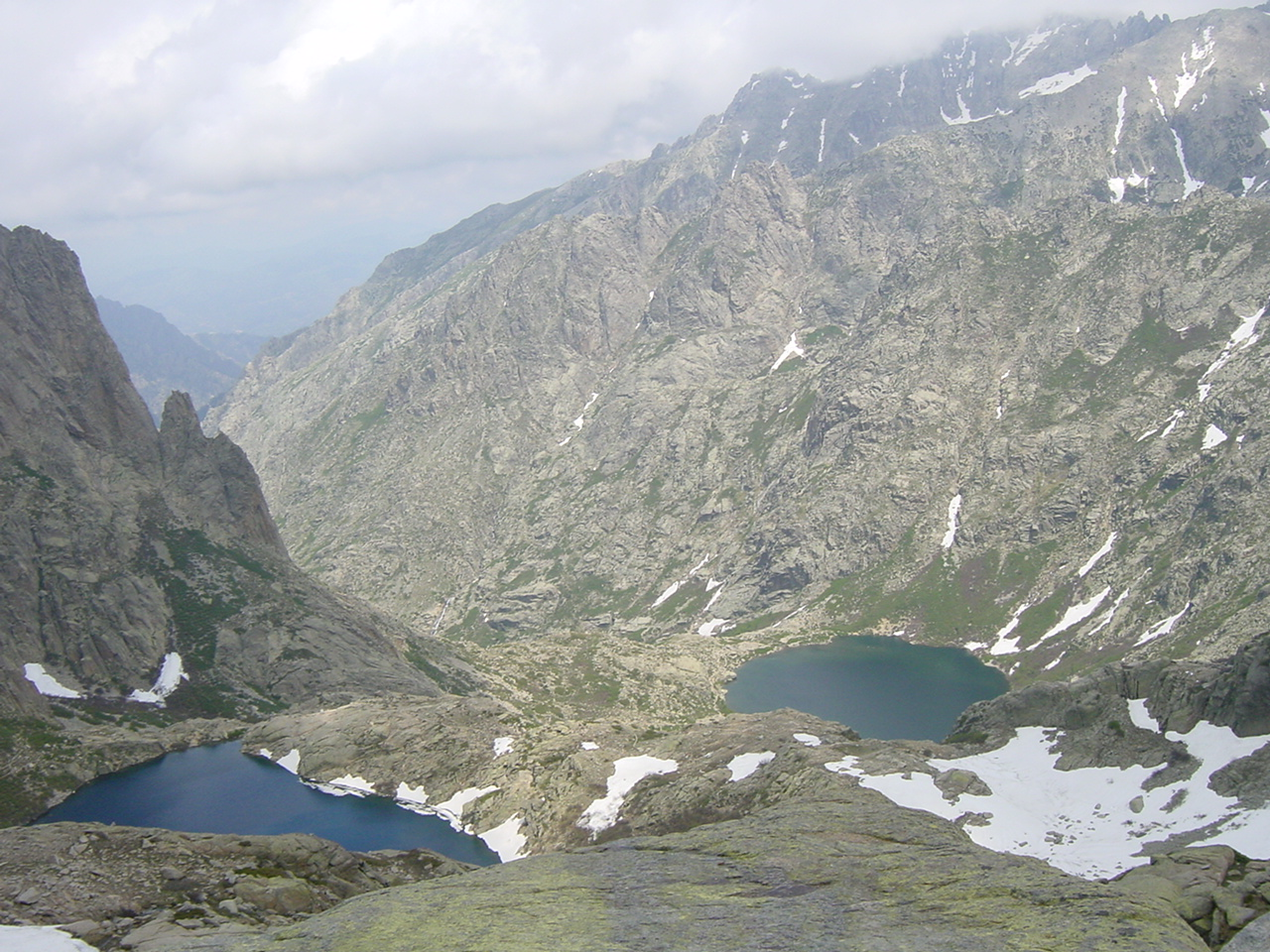
Lakes Capitello and Melo

The valley lies in the Monte Rotondo Massif and contains Lac de Melu at 1,711 metres (5,614 ft) and Lac de Capitellu at 1,930 metres (6,330 ft). It is accessible by the narrow and winding D623, which extends up to the Bergeries de Grutelle. In 2009 the municipality of Corte developed a plan to reconcile its protection, development and tourist exploitation. The Restonica Valley is an important source of tourist income for central Corsica and has been a listed site since 1966. Tourists may visit to contemplate the scenery, to swim in its clear waters, or to access the high mountains via the GR 20 trails. It can be very busy in the high season.

The banks of the river are lined with pines. The course of the river is dotted with waterfalls and deep natural basins carved into the granite that visitors can use to cool off during the heat of summer. A marked trail leads from the Bergeries de Grotelle at the end of the D623 to Lac de Melo, a hike of about an hour. The lake covers about 6.5 hectares (16 acres) and is no more than 20 metres (66 ft) deep. It is frozen for half the year. Lake Capitello is higher up and can be reached with another one-hour walk up a much harder trail. It is 340 by 250 metres (1,120 by 820 ft) and covers 5.5 hectares (14 acres). It is the deepest lake in Corsica with a maximum depth of 42 metres (138 ft) and stays frozen for more than eight months each year.

== Tributaries ==
The following streams (ruisseaux) are tributaries of the Restonica (ordered by length) and sub-tributaries:

- Rivisecco 7 km (4.3 mi)
  - Pianella 2 km (1.2 mi)
- Bravino 5 km (3.1 mi)
  - Formicuccia 2 km (1.2 mi)
  - Coloneili 1 km (0.62 mi)
- Timozzo 4 km (2.5 mi)
- Figarella 3 km (1.9 mi)
- Nucario 3 km (1.9 mi)
- Castelli 2 km (1.2 mi)
  - Prate di Giodda 1 km (0.62 mi)
- Pozzi 2 km (1.2 mi)
- Sorbello 2 km (1.2 mi)
- Rinoso 2 km (1.2 mi)
- Frasseta 2 km (1.2 mi)
- Valdaniello 2 km (1.2 mi)
- Cavacciole 2 km (1.2 mi)
- Renelluccio 1 km (0.62 mi)
- Grottelle 1 km (0.62 mi)
- Camorrette 1 km (0.62 mi)

== Gallery ==
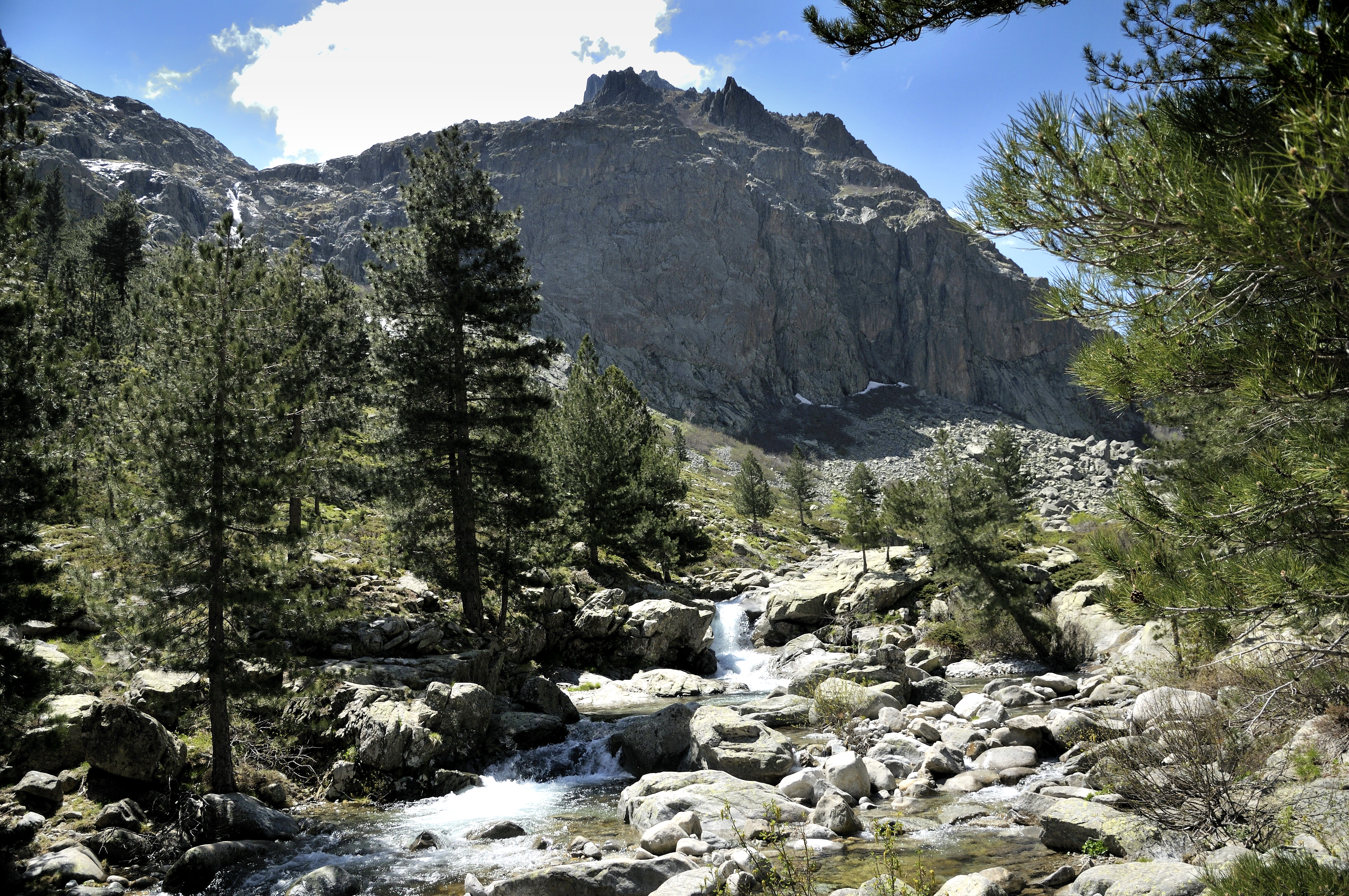
Restonica valley

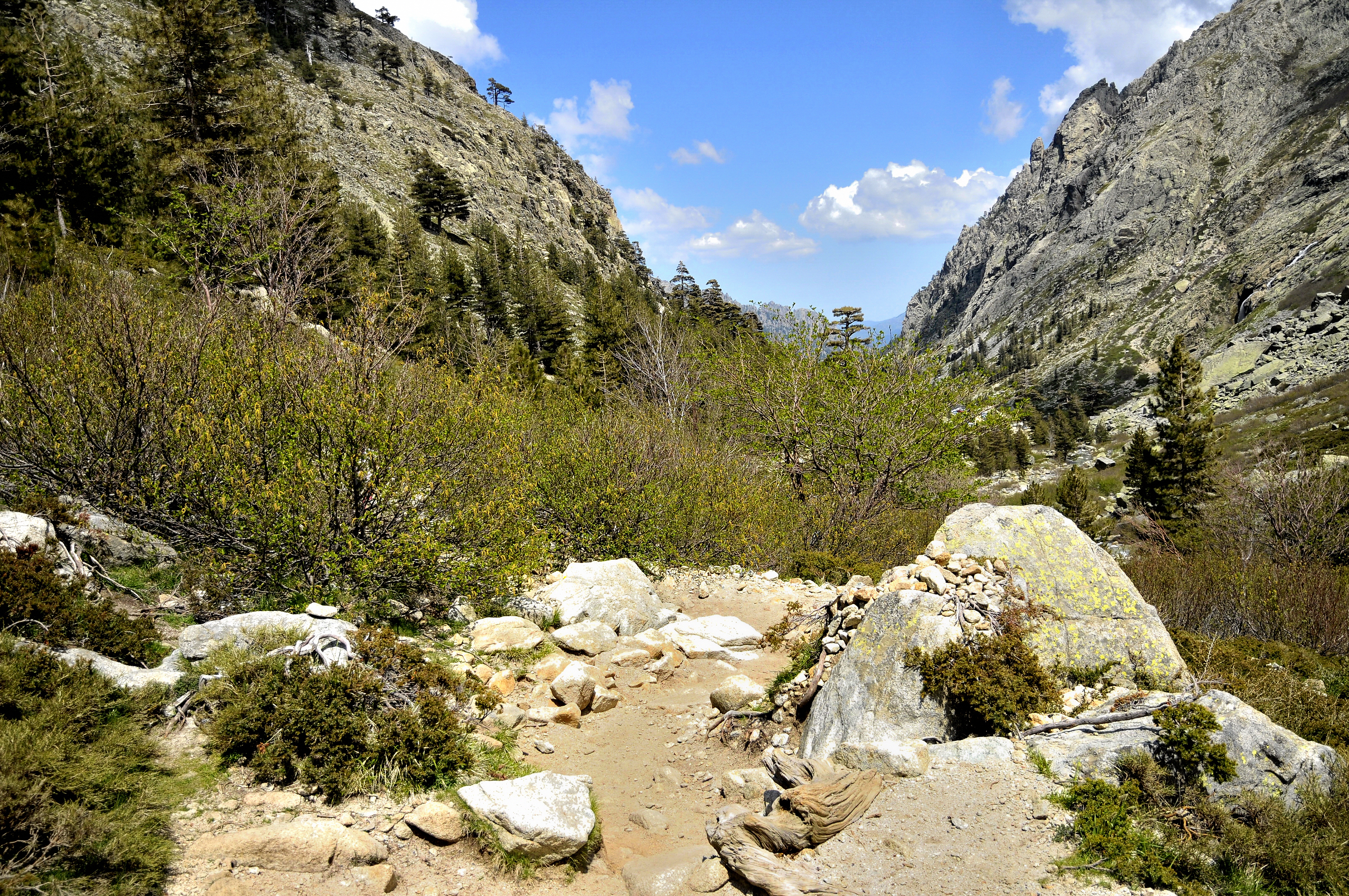
The hiking trail leading to Lake Melo

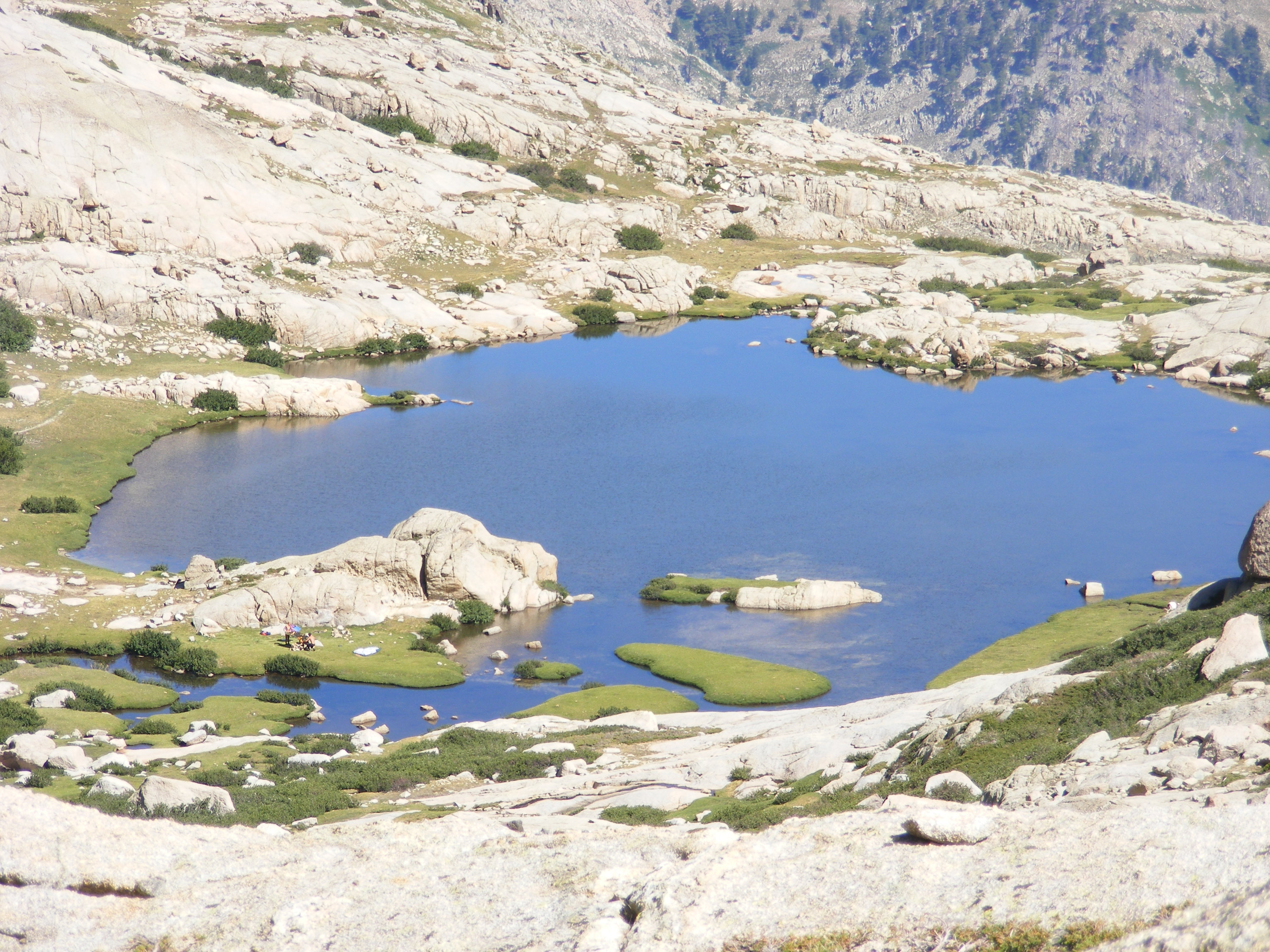
Lac de l'Oriente

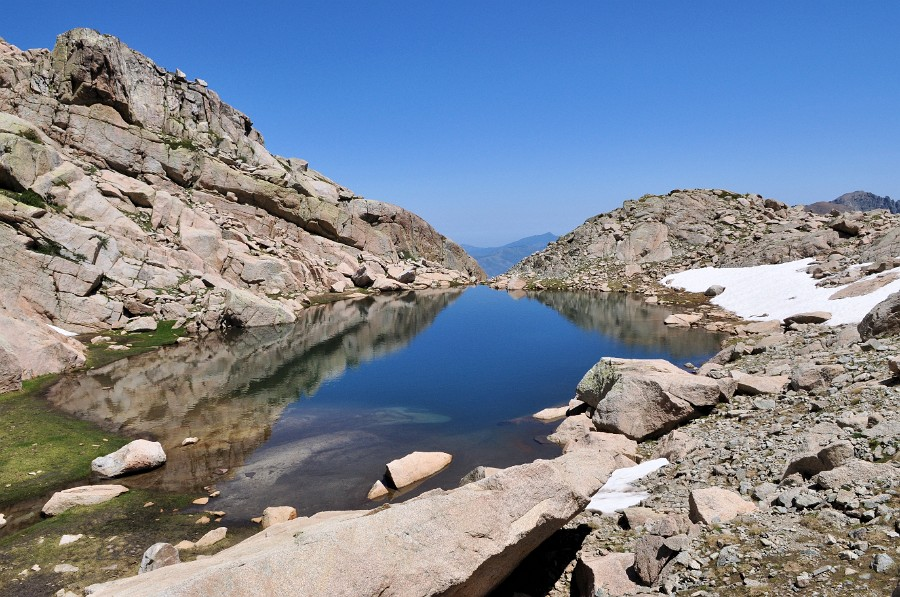
Lac de Pozzolo

== Sources ==
- La vallée de la Restonica (in French), Office de Tourisme de Corte, 2013
- "La Restonica", Sandre (in French)
- Moreau, Nathalie (14 July 2021), "Corse : baignade et randonnées dans les gorges de la Restonica", Figaro nautisme (in French)
- "Relation: La Restonica (2892937)", OpenStreetMap
