= Melu =

Melu or MELU may refer to:

- Ashious Melu, Zambian football player
- Mizinga Melu, Zambian businesswoman
- Lac de Melu, a lake in Corsica, France
- Melu, a deity of the Blaan people
- MELU, the Index Herbariorum code for the University of Melbourne Herbarium.
