= Monte Rotondo Massif =

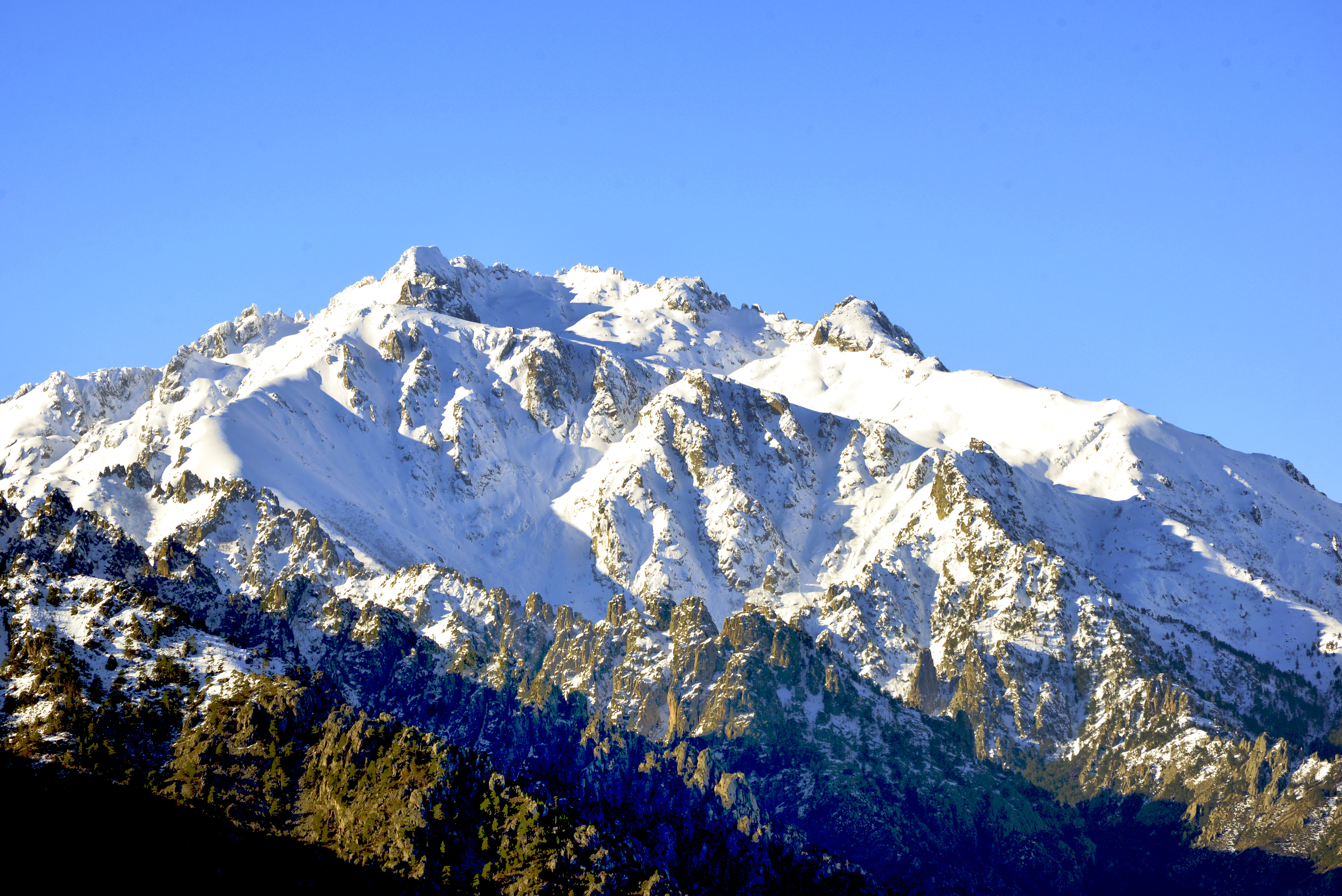
- Monte Rotondo from Tralonca

Highest point
- Peak: Monte Rotondo
- Elevation: 2,622 m (8,602 ft)
- Coordinates: 42°12′58″N 9°03′28″E

Geography
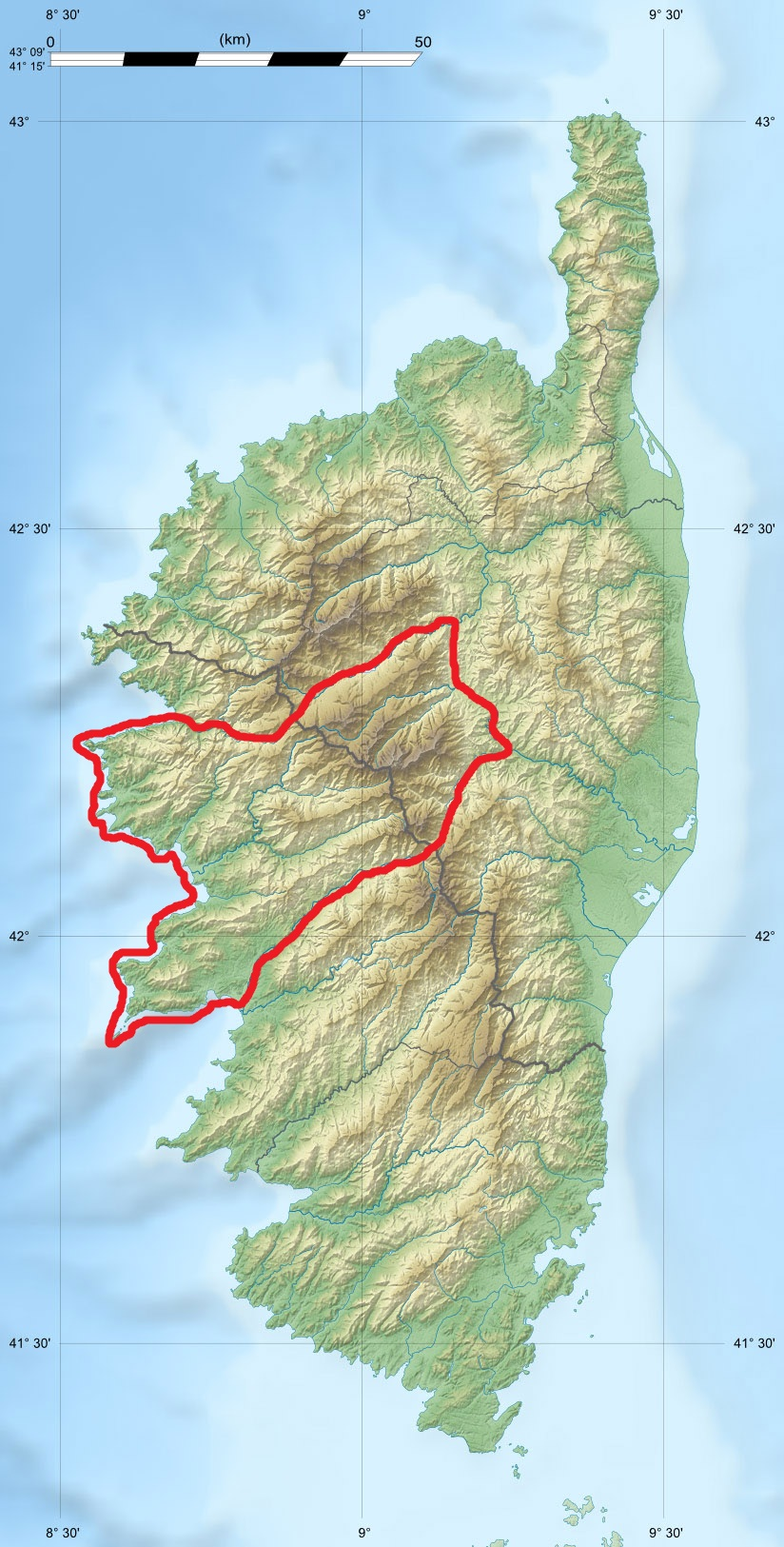
- Location: Corsica, France

The Monte Rotondo Massif (French: Massif du Monte Rotondo) is a chain of mountains on the southern side of Corsica, France. It takes its name from Monte Rotondo, the highest peak.

== Location ==
The Monte Rotondo Massif is one of the four main blocks of mountains in Corsica. These are (from north to south), the Monte Cinto Massif, Monte Rotondo Massif, Monte Renoso Massif and Monte Incudine Massif. These massifs form the Corse cristalline, mainly composed of magmatic rocks such as granites, granulites, porphyries and rhyolites. The Monte Rotondo Massif is located between the Col de Vergio and the Col de Vizzavona. It extends westward through the hills of Ajaccio, and eastward to the Sillon de Corte.

== Peaks ==
The main peaks are,

Name	Elevation		Prominence	
Name	metres	feet	metres	feet
Monte Rotondo	2,622	8,602	0	0
Punta Mufrena	2,590	8,500	0	0
Maniccia	2,496	8,189	0	0
Monte Cardo	2,453	8,048	0	0
Punta Felicina	2,437	7,995	0	0
Monte d'Oro	2,390	7,840	0	0
Punta Muzzella	2,342	7,684	0	0
Punta Artica	2,327	7,635	0	0
Punta alle Porte	2,313	7,589	0	0
Lombarduccio	2,268	7,441	0	0
Punta Migliarello	2,254	7,395	0	0
Cimatella	2,100	6,900	0	0
Capu a u Tozzu	2,007	6,585	0	0
Pinerole	1,951	6,401	0	0
Monte Cervellu	1,622	5,322	0	0
Capu d'Orto	1,294	4,245	0	0

== See also ==
- List of mountains in Corsica by height

== Sources ==
- Grande région écologique K Corse (PDF) (in French), IGN Agences de l'Eau, 2011
- "Massif du Monte Incudine en France", The Outsiders (in French)
