= Lac de Capitellu =

Lake in Haute-Corse

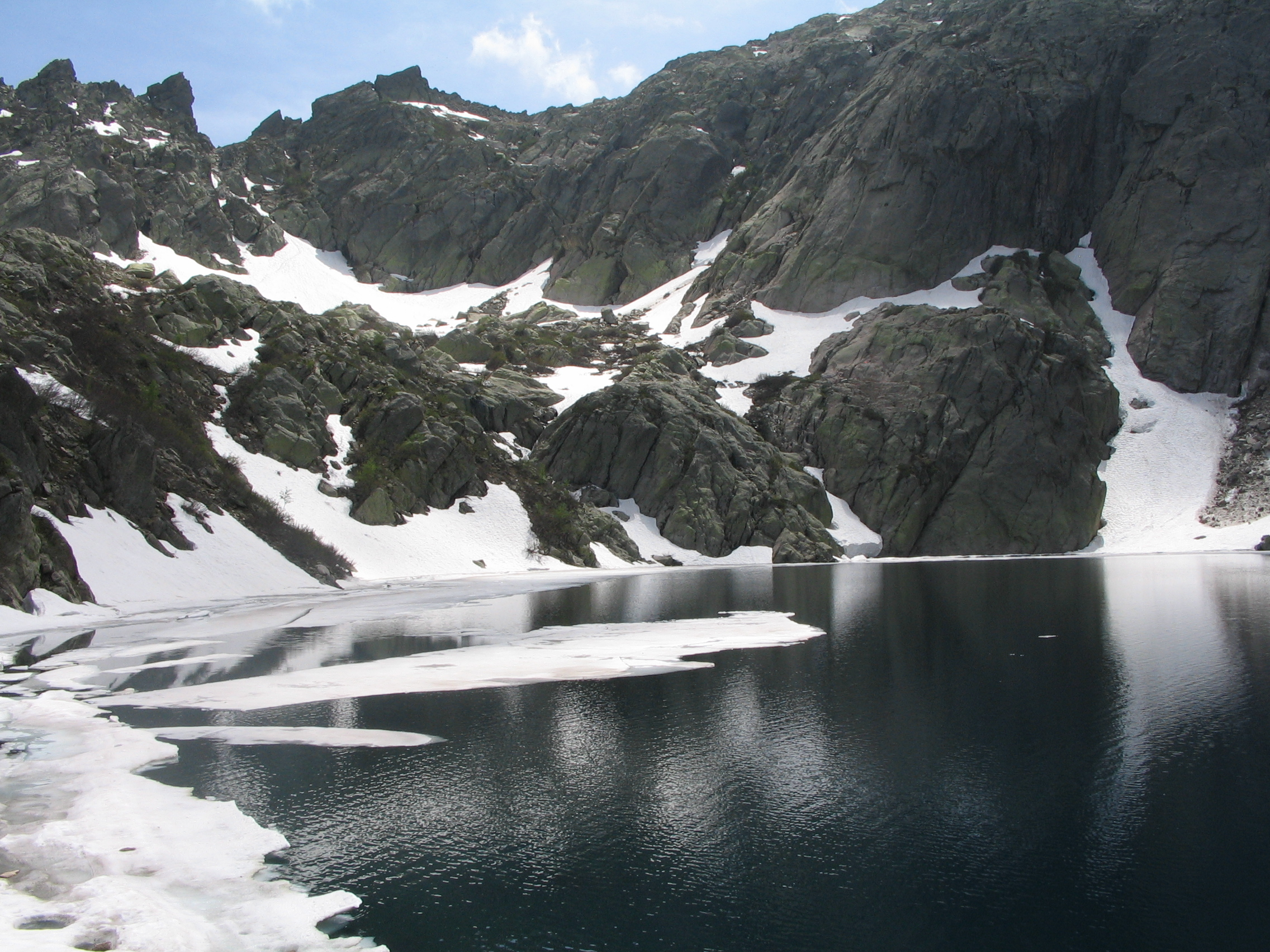

- Location within Corsica
- Location: Corte, Haute-Corse
- Coordinates: 42°12′45″N 9°0′43″E
- Type: glacial
- Primary outflows: Tavignano
- Basin countries: France
- Surface area: 0.055 km^{2} (0.021 sq mi)
- Average depth: 16.2 m (53 ft)
- Max. depth: 42 m (138 ft)
- Surface elevation: 1,930 m (6,330 ft)

Lac de Capitellu is a lake in Haute-Corse, France. At an elevation of 1930 m, its surface area is 0.055 km^{2}.

It is close to Lac de Melu, in the commune of Corte.

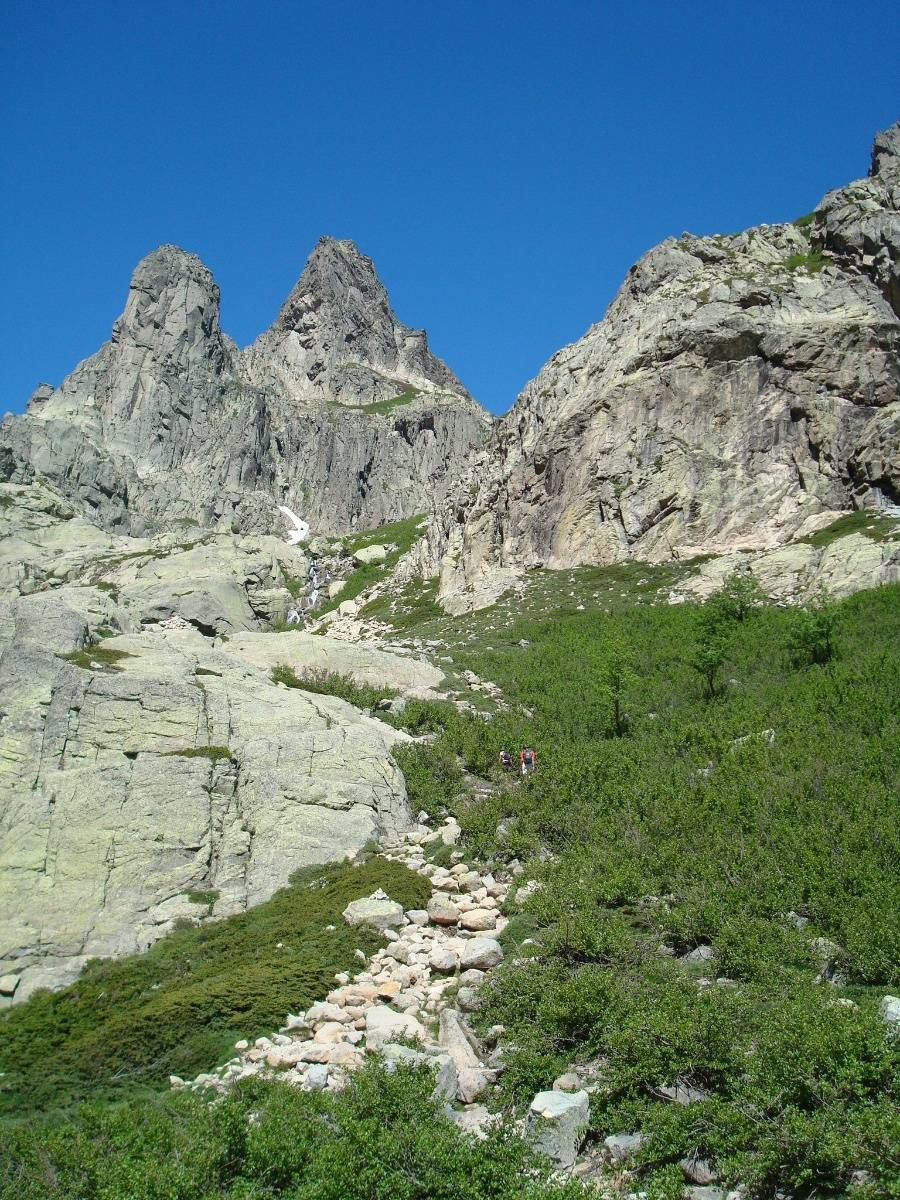

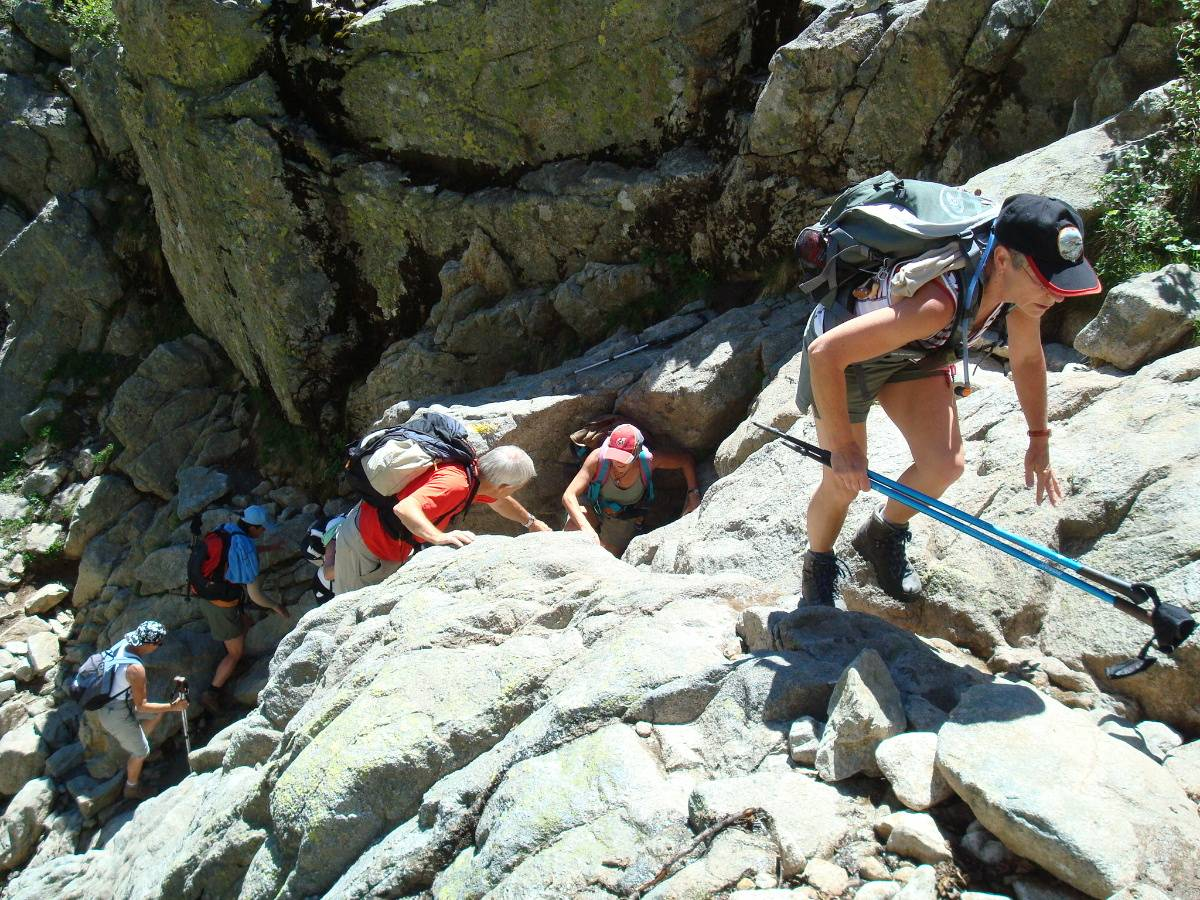

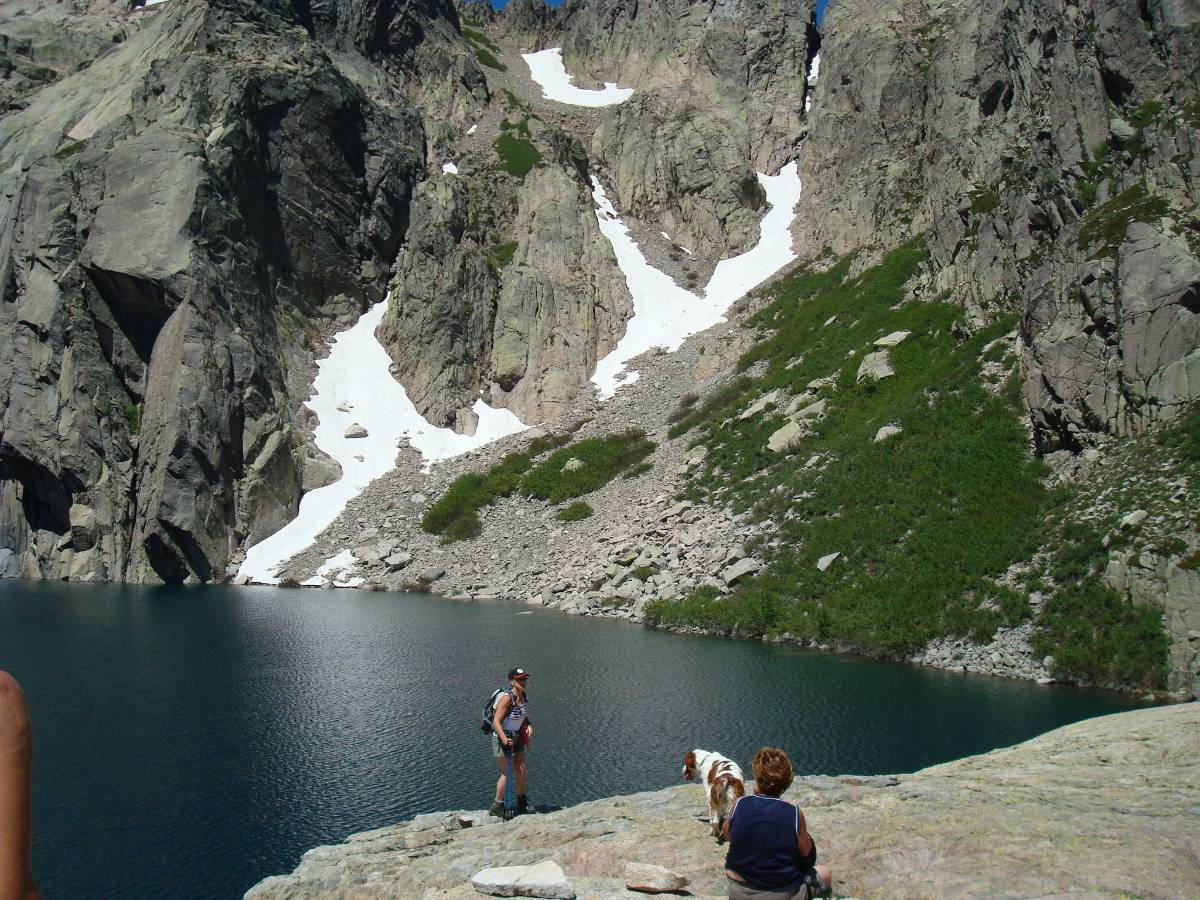

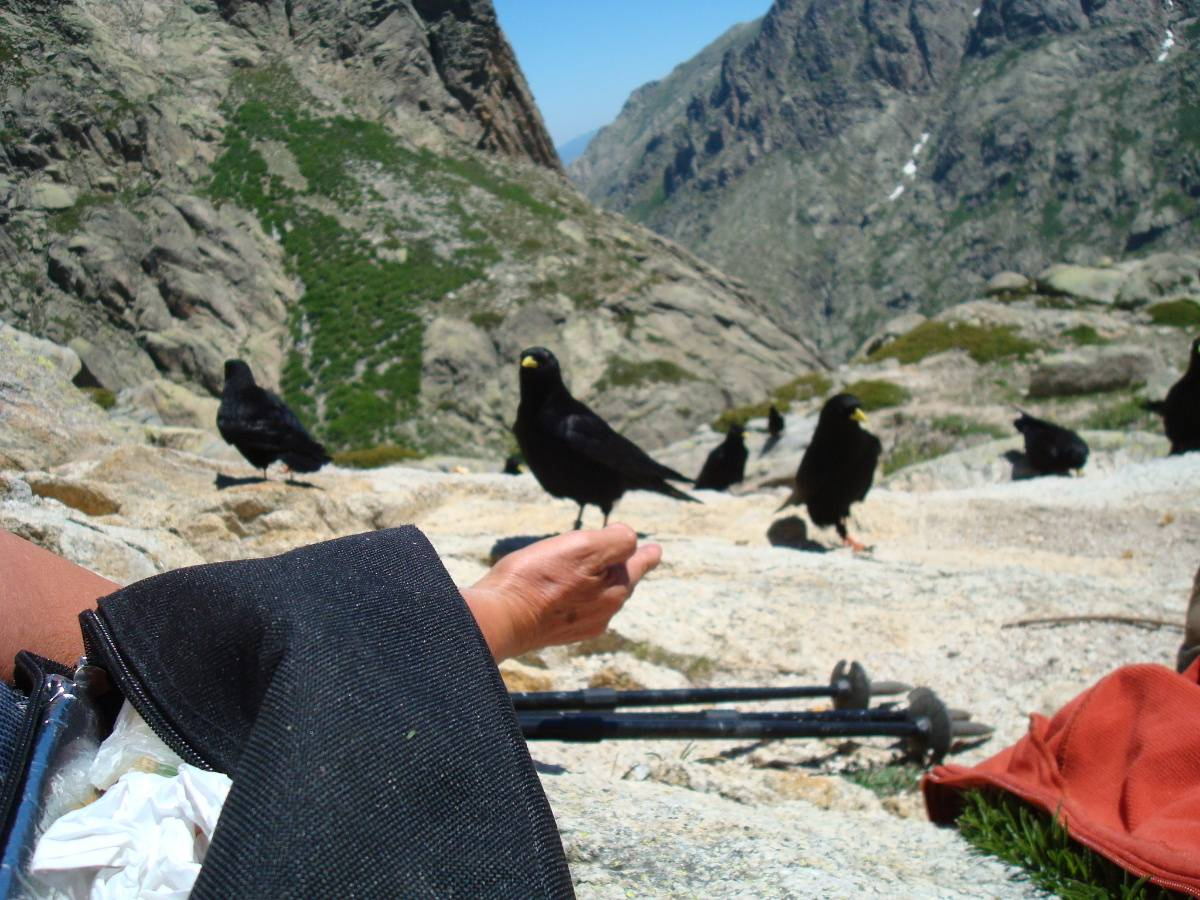

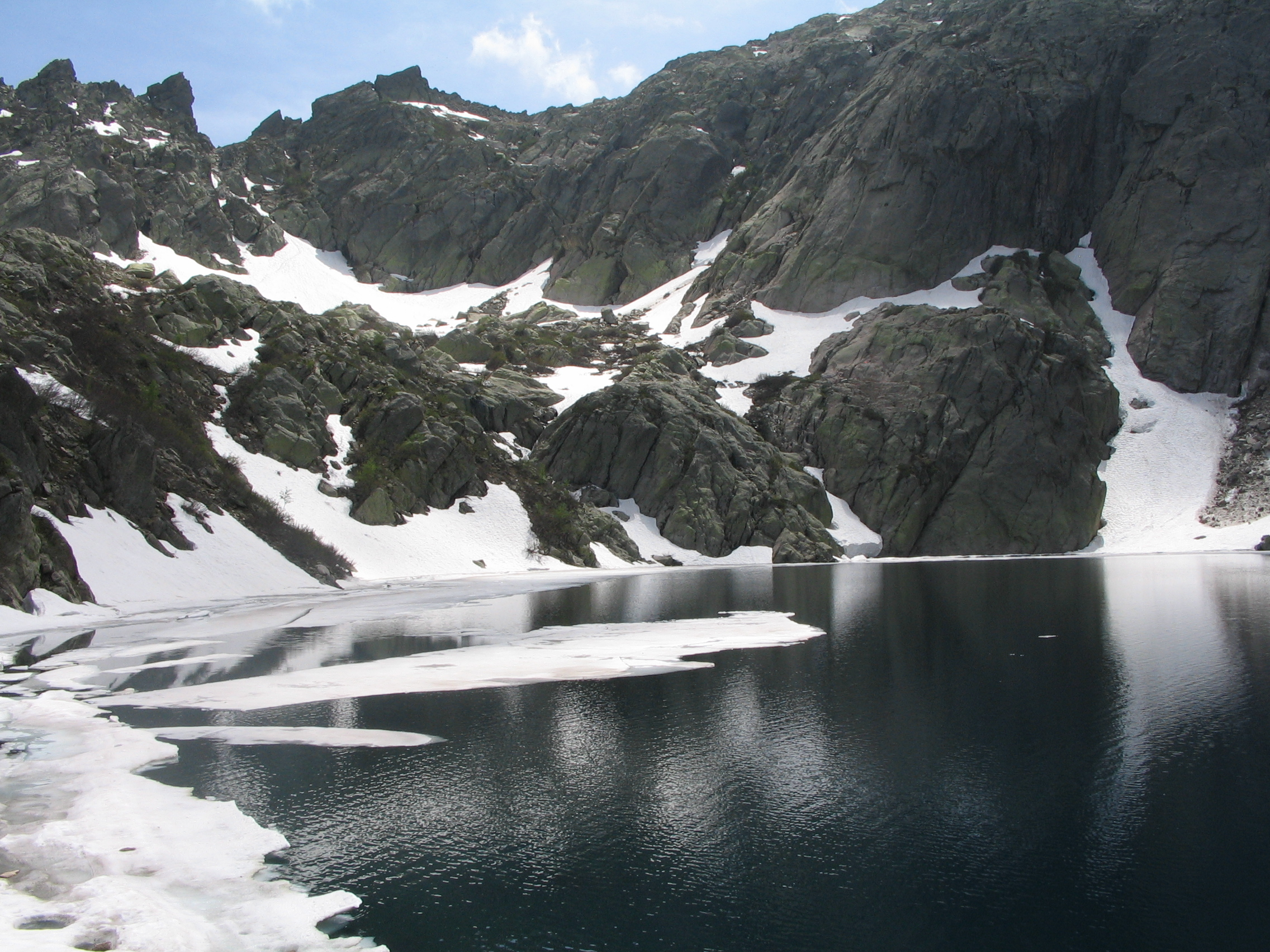
