= Monte Incudine Massif =

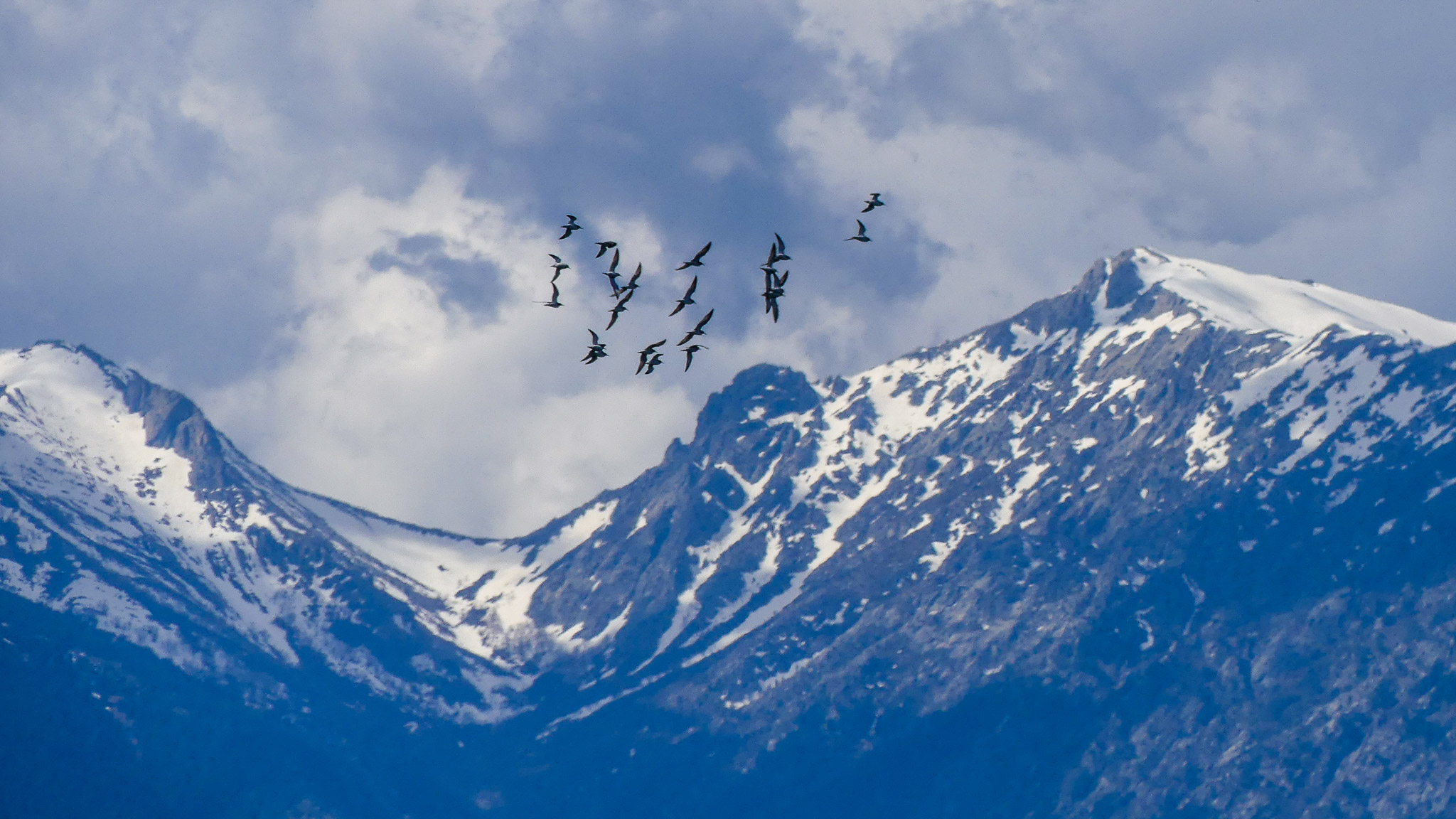
- Tintinnaghja and Bocca d'Asinau

Highest point
- Peak: Monte Incudine
- Elevation: 2,134 m (7,001 ft)
- Coordinates: 41°50′57″N 9°12′26″E

Geography
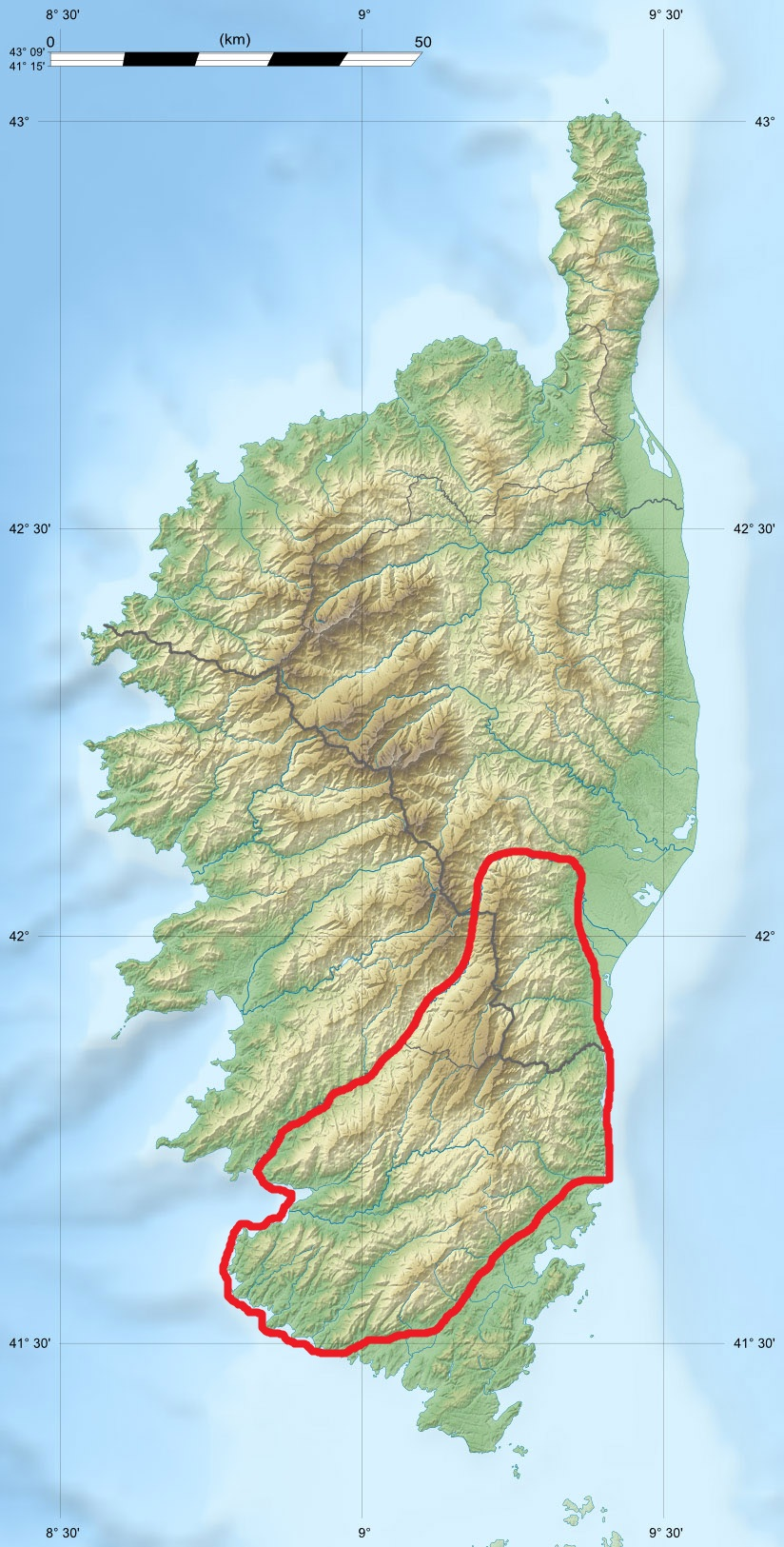
- Location: Corsica, France

The Monte Incudine Massif (French: Massif du Monte Incudine) is a chain of mountains located in the south region of the island of Corsica, France. It takes its name from Monte Incudine, which is the highest peak.

== Location ==
The Monte Incudine massif is the southernmost of the four largest blocks of mountains in Corsica, the others being (from north to south), the Monte Cinto Massif, Monte Rotondo Massif, and Monte Renoso Massif. These massifs form the Corse cristalline, mainly composed of magmatic rocks such as granites, granulites, porphyries and rhyolites. The Monte Incudine Massif dominates the Sartenais and extends south to the Cagna mountain.

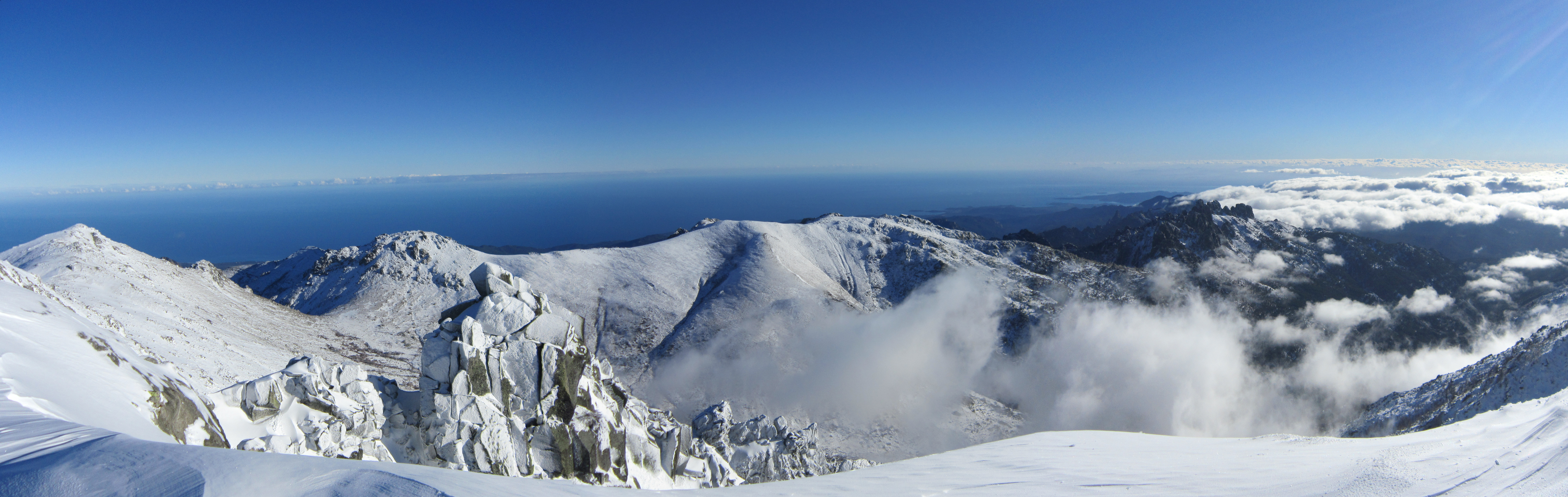
Panorama of the eastern sector of the Alcudina (from left to right ː Bucca d'Asinau, Punta Muvrariccia, Punta di U Furnellu, Bavedda)

== Peaks ==
The main peaks are,

Name	Elevation		Prominence	
Name	meters	feet	meters	feet
Monte Incudine	2,134	7,001	0	0
Punta Scarachiana	2,128	6,982	0	0
Cappella	2,041	6,696	0	0
Punta di Tintennaja	2,018	6,621	0	0
Monte Furmicula	1,981	6,499	0	0
Punta di u Furnellu	1,902	6,240	0	0
Punta Muvrareccia	1,899	6,230	0	0
Aiguilles de Bavella	1,857	6,093	0	0
Punta Velaco	1,483	4,865	0	0
Monte San Petru	1,400	4,600	0	0
Cagna	1,371	4,498	0	0
Punta di a Vacca Morta	1,316	4,318	0	0

== See also ==
- List of mountains in Corsica by height

== Sources ==
- Grande région écologique K Corse (PDF) (in French), IGN Agences de l'Eau, 2011
- "Massif du Monte Incudine en France", The Outsiders (in French)
