= Common Rotation =

US musical group

Common Rotation

Common Rotation is an American indie folk rock band consisting of Eric Kufs (vocals, guitar), Adam Busch (vocals, saxophone, harmonica, glockenspiel), and Jordan Katz (vocals, trumpet, banjo). The three are childhood friends from New York City and have been making music together for almost 20 years.

== History ==
The band was formed by Kufs and Busch while they were in high school in East Meadow, New York in the early 1990s with two other members, and was originally known as 28 Orange Street. They debuted at the Nassau County Folk Festival, and soon began performing hundreds of gigs each year throughout the northeastern United States. As 28 Orange Street, the quartet released their first album, titled Common Rotation.

The band recorded its first record as Common Rotation with the help of They Might Be Giants, who subsequently backed them on the recording and allowed them to open on their first major tour across the United States. In 2007 they toured the United Kingdom, albeit without Jordan Katz, alongside David Berkeley.

Common Rotation have self-released five full length records and 'A Song A Day' for over ten years online at the website "The Union Maid".

== Collaborations ==
Common Rotation can be heard on Dan Bern's two albums, Live in Los Angeles and Live in New York and provided the soundtrack to the film "Drones".

"True Hollywood Romance" from The ClearChannel EP is featured as theme music in Kevin Pollak's comedy special, The Littlest Suspect.

Common Rotation recorded Twisted Sister's, "We're Not Gonna Take It" with Mike Viola for the latest installment of Engine Room Recordings Guilt by Association series, Guilt by Association Vol. 3.

The band recorded "Salty South" with the Indigo Girls for their live record, Staring Down The Brilliant Dream.

== In other media ==
Peter Stass's documentary film How to Lose chronicled the band's efforts to protest Clear Channel's monopoly on the musical touring market by playing in fan's homes from Alaska to Europe.

Amber Benson's music video for Wasted Words follows the band while performing for the Yupik peoples in the remote fishing villages of Kotlik and Russian Mission, Alaska.

Their song "Clear Channel" was featured in British Indie filmmaker Evan Richards' 2006 film, "In a Day."

== Personnel ==
Busch is also known for his work as an actor (The Mystery Files of Shelby Woo, Buffy the Vampire Slayer, The Professional, Grey's Anatomy, House, American Dreamz).

Katz has worked with hip hop groups (De La Soul, Big Daddy Kane, Ghostface Killah, Neon Trees, Lucinda Williams, Jennifer Nettles, The Rhythm Roots Allstars).

Kufs is a singer-songwriter who has completed his first solo collection of songs, "A Dust Bowl Full O' Cherries.

=== Compilations ===
- "We're Not Gonna Take It" (Twisted Sister cover) from Guilt by Association Vol. 3 (2011).
