= Lac de l'Oriente =

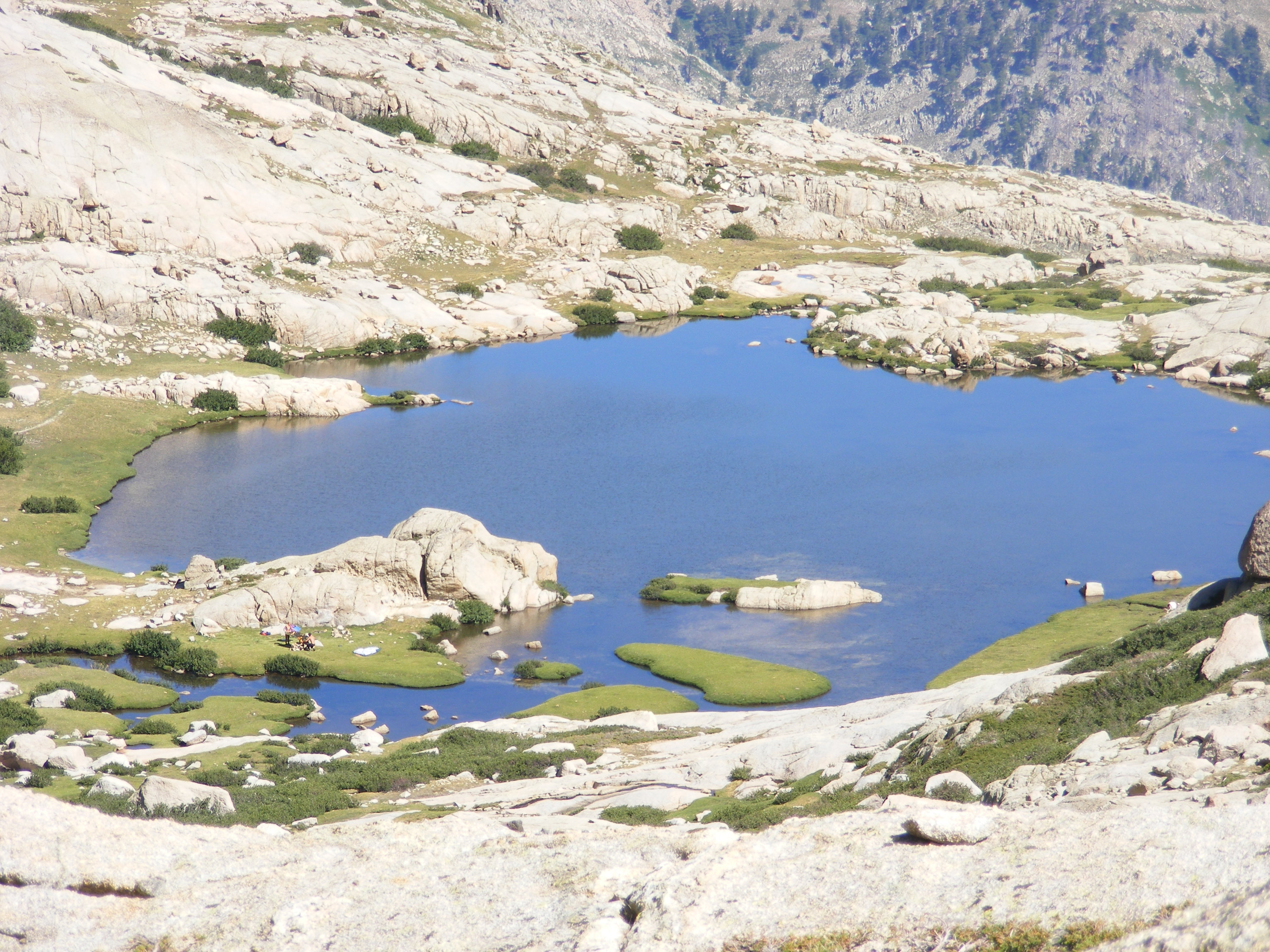

- Location within Corsica
- Location: Corsica
- Coordinates: 42°13′40″N 9°3′32″E
- Type: glacial
- Basin countries: France
- Surface area: 1 ha (2.5 acres)
- Average depth: 1.8 m (5 ft 11 in)
- Surface elevation: 2,060 m (6,760 ft)

Lac de l'Oriente is a lake in Corsica, France.

The Lac de l'Oriente (East Lake) is in a basin on the north slope of Monte Rotondo. Its outlet is the Ruisseau de Lomento. This is a tributary of the Ruisseau Timozzo, in turn a tributary of the Restonica river. It is in the watershed of the Tavignano river.
