= Peter Bradley Adams =

American singer-songwriter

- Origin: Birmingham, Alabama
- Genres: Americana, folk-pop, pop rock, ambient
- Occupations: Singer-songwriter, producer, musician, composer
- Instruments: Piano, guitar, vocals
- Years active: 2001–present
- Label: Sarathan Records
- Website: www.peterbradleyadams.com

Peter Bradley Adams is a folk-pop Americana singer-songwriter from Birmingham, Alabama. Adams was a founding member in 2001 of the folk pop duo eastmountainsouth. The duo had success with the single "You Dance" while Adam's cover of the song "Hard Times" appeared in the Cameron Crowe's 2005 film, Elizabethtown. Adams began focusing on his solo career in late 2004. Adams's songs have appeared in more than 30 films and television shows in the US (including One Tree Hill, Smallville, and The Mentalist).

== Early life and education ==
A native of Birmingham, Alabama, Adams credits his grandfather, a former professional jazz clarinetist and accomplished pianist, as being his earliest musical inspiration. Adams began playing piano at the age of 6 and continued studying piano throughout high school at Deerfield Academy in Deerfield, Massachusetts and college. He worked with composer Michael Kapsner while studying abroad in Freiburg, Germany. While focusing on piano, organ, and music composition, his experience in Germany inspired Adams to continue his musical studies stateside. Adams graduated with a Bachelor of Arts degree in Music from the University of the South in Sewanee, Tennessee. He continued his studies at the University of Alabama's School of Music in Tuscaloosa where he earned a master's degree in Music Composition. Adams moved to Los Angeles in the mid-1990s to study film scoring at USC Thornton School of Music's Scoring for Motion Pictures and Television (SMPTV) program.

== Career ==
Adams worked as a freelance score composer for film and television until forming eastmountainsouth in 2001.

=== Eastmountainsouth ===
Adams was a founding member of the folk pop duo eastmountainsouth. Within a year of forming eastmountainsouth in 2001 with Kat Maslich Bode, they were signed by Robbie Robertson to DreamWorks Records.

Adams co-produced their 2003 debut album with Mitchell Froom, and toured extensively for the next year and a half with acts including Lucinda Williams, Tracy Chapman, Joan Baez and Nelly Furtado. Their single "You Dance" was a #1 AAA radio hit (top 5 for 2 months) in 2003 and eastmountainsouth performed on Late Night with Conan O'Brien on September 24, 2003. DreamWorks Records was sold to Universal Music Group in October 2003, which shifted their rights to different labels until Adams and eastmountainsouth eventually negotiated their official release.

Eastmountainsouth performed their last show in September 2004 at the Hollywood Bowl with Shelby Lynne and Lyle Lovett. Soon after, Adams decided to work on his own as a solo artist.

Adams's cover of Stephen Foster's "Hard Times", the opening track on eastmountainsouth's album, appeared in Cameron Crowe's 2005 film, Elizabethtown and also was included on the soundtrack album.

=== Solo career ===
After releasing a limited edition solo EP in 2005, Adams was praised by some critics, including The Boston Globe, who called it, "a beautiful set of Americana music...It confirms the dreamy-voiced Adams as an artist to follow." This effort was followed up by his first full-length solo release "Gather Up" in 2006. Most of the album was recorded in his apartment in 2005 between touring dates. Southern Californian session musician Greg Leisz is featured on Queen of Hearts. Based on the response from this release, Adams was named "Notable New Artist of the Year" in 2006 by The Loft (Sirius XM) Satellite Radio.

Before recording his next collection of music, Adams headed east to Nashville to be closer to musicians and producers with whom he wanted to work. While working on Gather Up, Adams formed a collaborative bond with session player and producer Lex Price. Now based out of Brooklyn, New York, Adams is signed to Sarathan Records, which released his sophomore solo release, Leavetaking. This title was inspired by Mark Strand's poem "The View".

In November 2008, Adams was named by The Wall Street Journal as one of the "21st-century writers whose songs are worth exploring", and as having "a way with melody and lyrics ... ready to be seen and heard".

In May 2009, Leavetaking earned Adams Indie Acoustic Project's "Best CDs of 2008" Award for Best Singer-Songwriter-Male.

In 2017, Adams released A Face Like Mine of which No Depression wrote "Ultimately, A Face Like Mine affirms the fact that Peter Bradley Adams is clearly one of Americana’s most consistent and commanding auteurs, and one whose recognition is long overdue."

In 2019, Adams was working on a sixth solo album, Afterglow.

=== Down Like Silver ===
In 2011, Adams formed Down Like Silver with singer/songwriter Caitlin Canty. The duo co-wrote and released a self-titled EP as well as a single "Light That Match" in 2013.

== Discography ==
Studio albums

- self-titled EP (2005)
- Gather Up (2006)
- Leavetaking (2008)
- Traces (2009)
- Between Us (2011)
- The Mighty Storm (2014)
- A Face Like Mine (2017)

Other Contributions

- eastmountainsouth "self-titled" (2003)
- Down Like Silver "self-titled" EP (2011)
- Down Like Silver "Light That Match" Single (2013)
- Down Like Silver "Broken Coastline" Single (2018)
- Down Like Silver "Against the Night" Single (2020)
- Down Like Silver "First Light" Single (2022)
