= Monte Incudine =

Mountain in Corsica, France

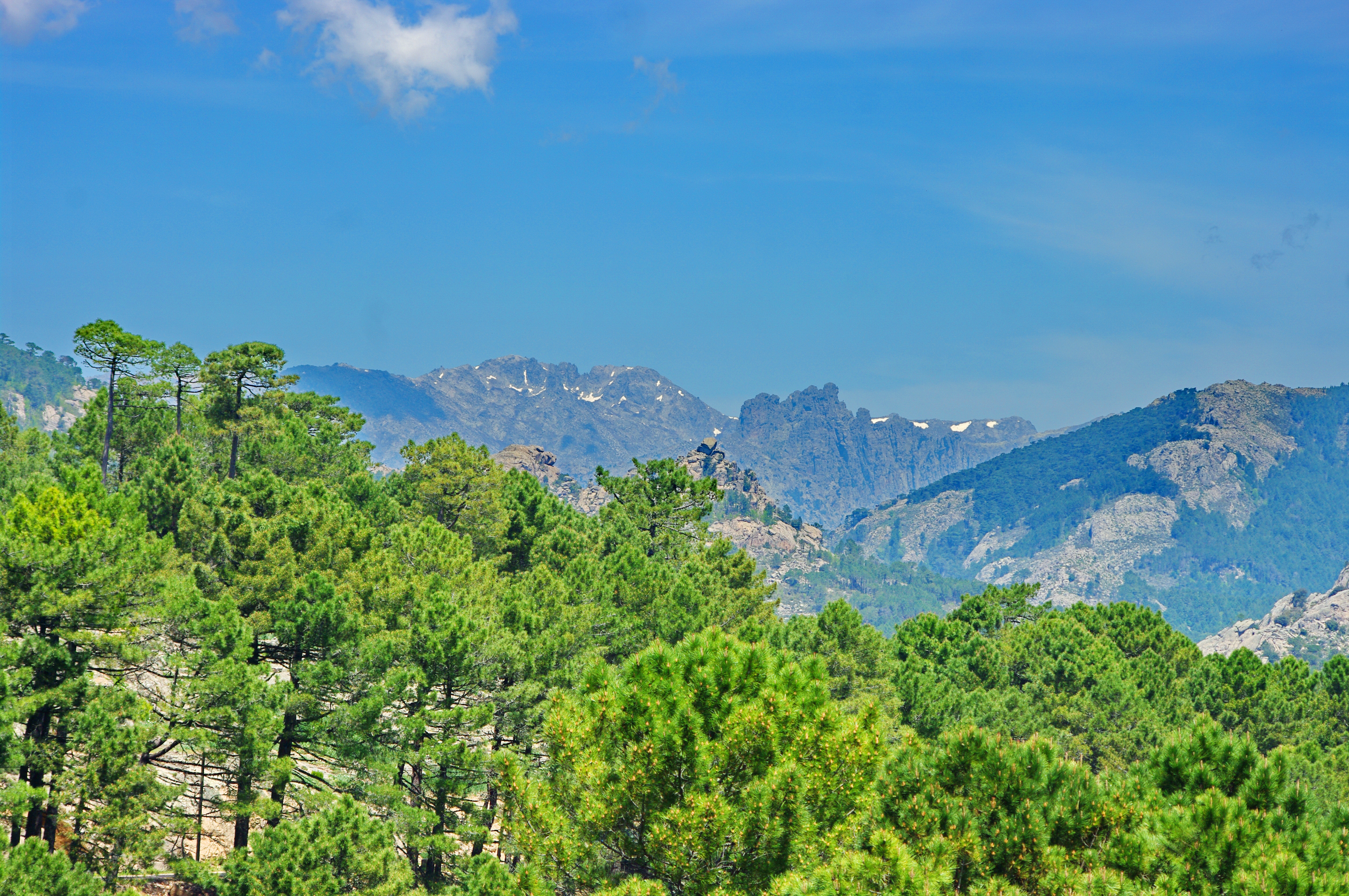
- Monte Incudine and the Aiguilles de Bavella from the Col d'Illarata

Highest point
- Prominence: 845 m (2,772 ft)
- Isolation: 22.07 km (13.71 mi)
- Coordinates: 41.84948°N 9.20736°E

Geography
- Location within Corsica
- Country: France
- Department: Corse-du-Sud

Monte Incudine (Corsican: Alcùdina) is a mountain in the department of Corse-du-Sud on the island of Corsica, France. It is the highest peak in the Monte Incudine Massif.

== Location ==
The peak is on the border between the communes of Zicavo to the northwest and Sartène to the southeast. The Ruisseau de l'Incudine rises on its northwest slope.

== Physical ==
Monte Incudine has prominence of 845 metres (2,772 ft) and elevation of 2,134 metres (7,001 ft). It is isolated by 22.07 kilometres (13.71 mi) from Monte Renoso to the north-northwest.

== Hiking ==
The hike to the summit is long, and very steep in some places. Lower down, vegetation includes Laricio pine forests and green meadows. Higher up it becomes more rocky, and the summit is a huge slab of rock strewn with boulders. Often the summit is shrouded by clouds, and snow tends to persist. However, the summit provides an excellent panorama of the Corsican mountains.

The mountain can be hiked as part of the GR 20 route. Alternatively, hikers can begin their climb from the Col de Bavella, accessible by road.

== Gallery ==
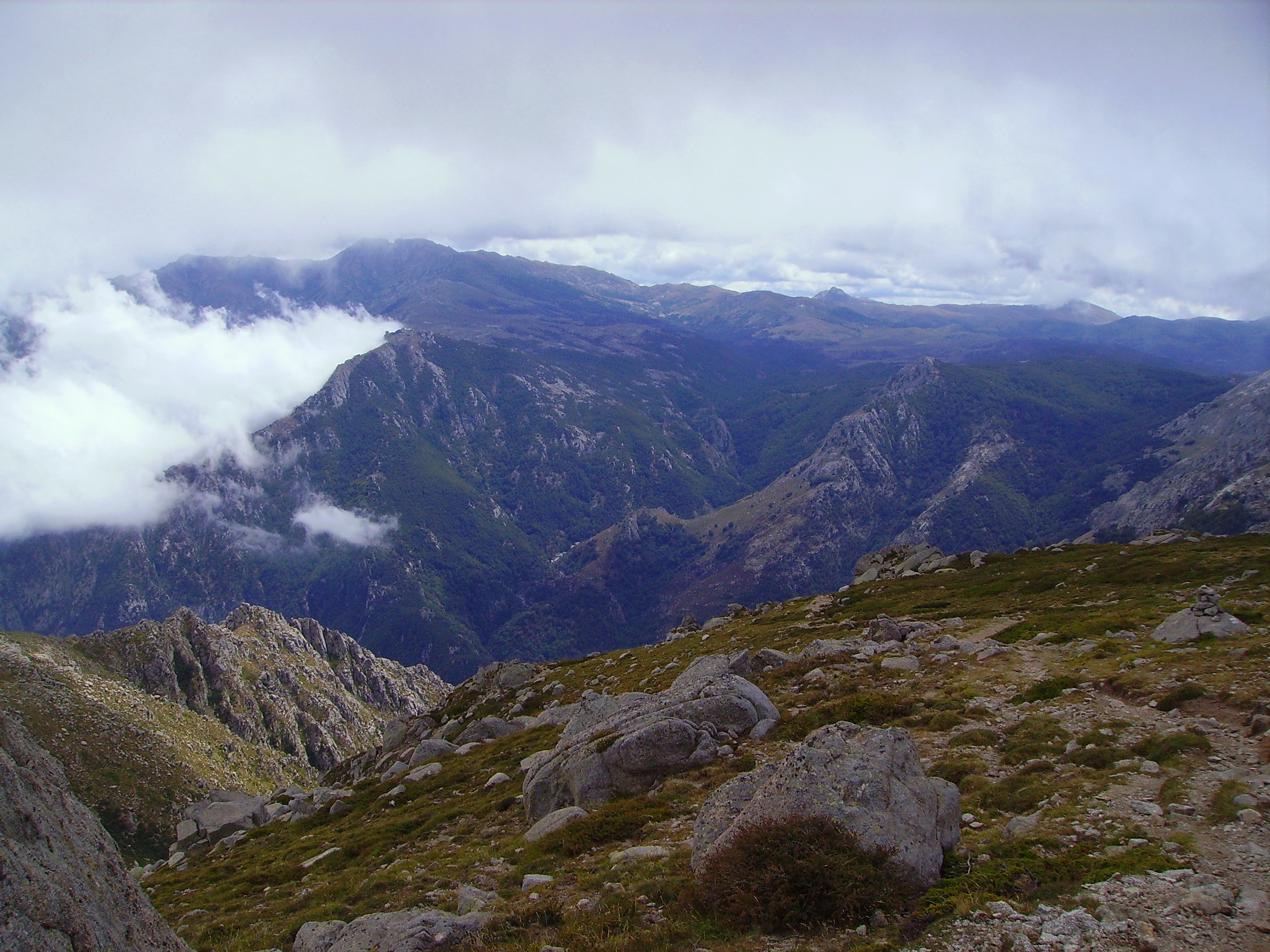
Incudine from Formicola

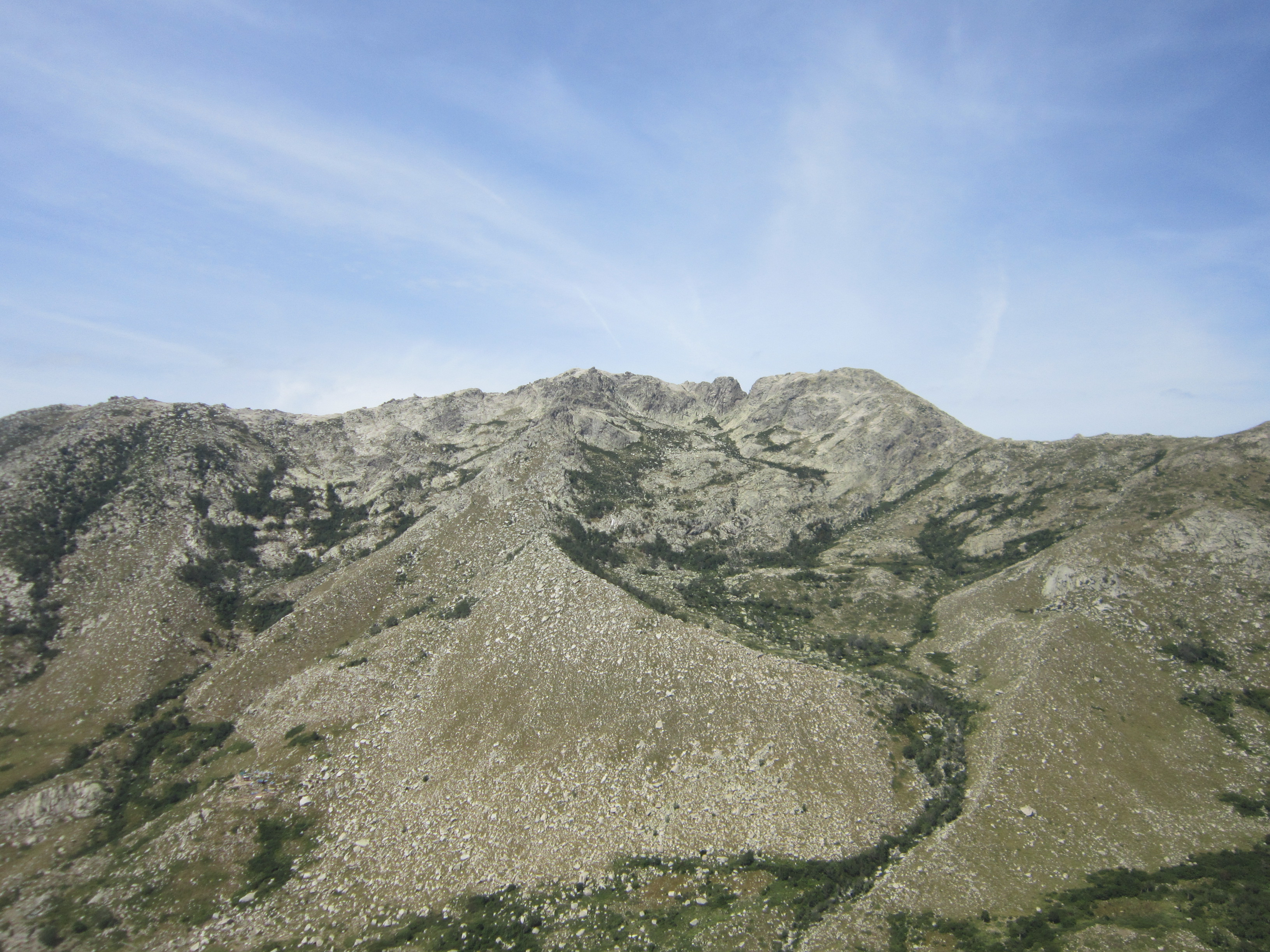
Summit of Incudine

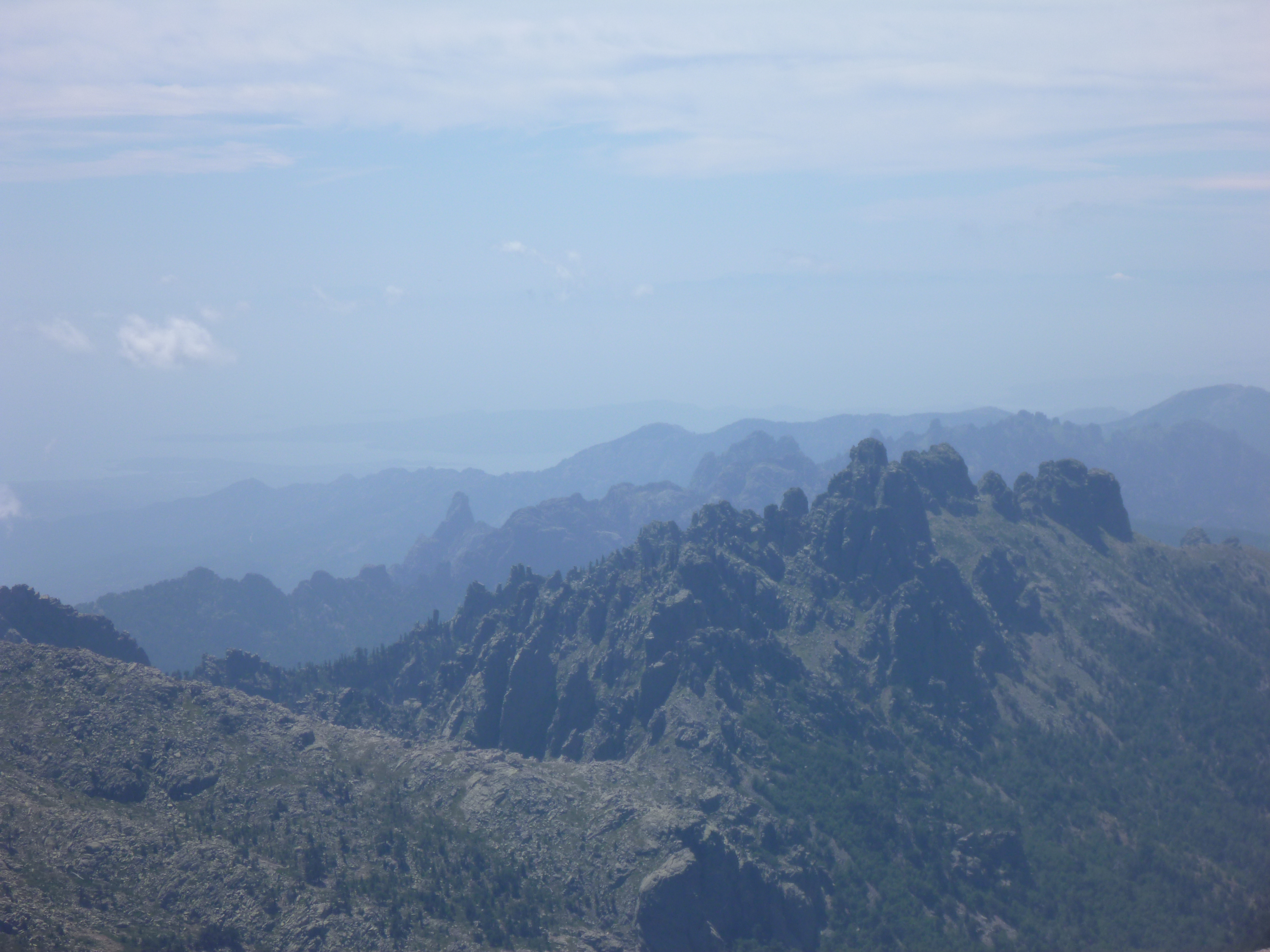
Aiguilles de Bavella from Incudine

== Sources ==
- "Le Monte Incudine", gr20-infos (in French)
- "Monte Incudine, France", Peakbagger
- "Node: Monte Incudine (26863878)", OpenStreetMap
