= Jordan Katz =

American musician

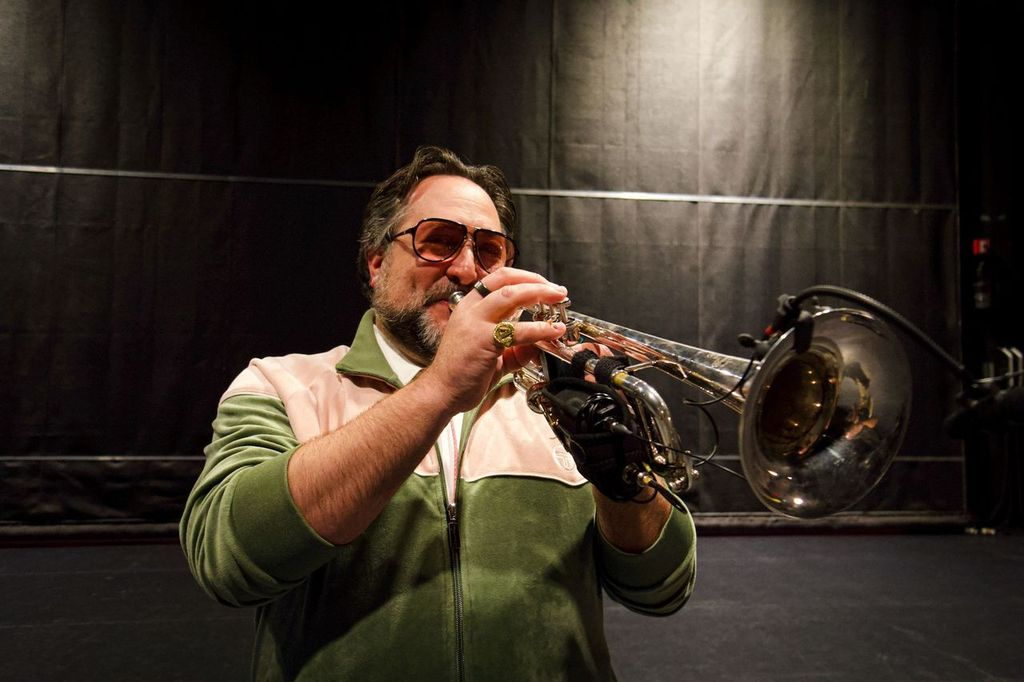
- Jordan Katz plays trumpet before a Varietopia show at The Egg in Albany, New York (June 2, 2025)

Background information
- Born: New York, United Statas
- Origin: East Meadow, Long Island, New York, United States
- Genres: Indie folk; pop; rock; various others
- Occupations: Musician; composer; producer
- Instruments: Trumpet; banjo
- Member of: Middle Aged Dad Jam Band; Varietopia Orchestra ("Varietorchestra")
- Formerly of: Common Rotation
- Website: www.jordankatzmusic.com

Jordan Katz is an American musician and composer. He is known for his work on trumpet and banjo, and is also a musical director. Katz has contributed to various projects in different genres, including hip-hop, pop, folk, and orchestral music, and has performed with artists such as Katy Perry, De La Soul, and They Might Be Giants. He is the musical director and bandleader for Paul F. Tompkins’ variety show Varietopia and the live podcast Thrilling Adventure Hour. Katz is an active band performer and manager in David Wain's and Ken Marino's Middle Aged Dad Jam Band.

Katz was part of the American indie folk rock band Common Rotation, where he played the trumpet and banjo.

== Career ==
Katz grew up in East Meadow, Long Island, New York and began his professional career in the folk trio Common Rotation with Eric Kufs and Adam Busch. As a session musician, he has collaborated with artists such as Big Daddy Kane, Ghostface Killah, Devendra Banhart, Bono, Dan Bern, Brother Ali, Father John Misty, Jason Isbell, Open Mike Eagle, and The Indigo Girls.

Katz is also a producer and composer. He has recorded, arranged and contributed to film scores and television cues as part of his work as an instrumentalist, including music for This Is Us, Bob's Burgers, NCIS: New Orleans, and The Late Late Show with James Corden. Katz was the bandleader and composer for TNT's competitive reality show Drop The Mic. He also co-wrote and produced one song per episode for Amazon's "Stinky and Dirty Hour". He also arranged the brass sections for the soundtrack of Red Dead Redemption 2 and Grand Theft Auto V.

== See also ==
- Common Rotation
- Middle Aged Dad Jam Band
