= Lac de Melu =

Lake in Corsica, France

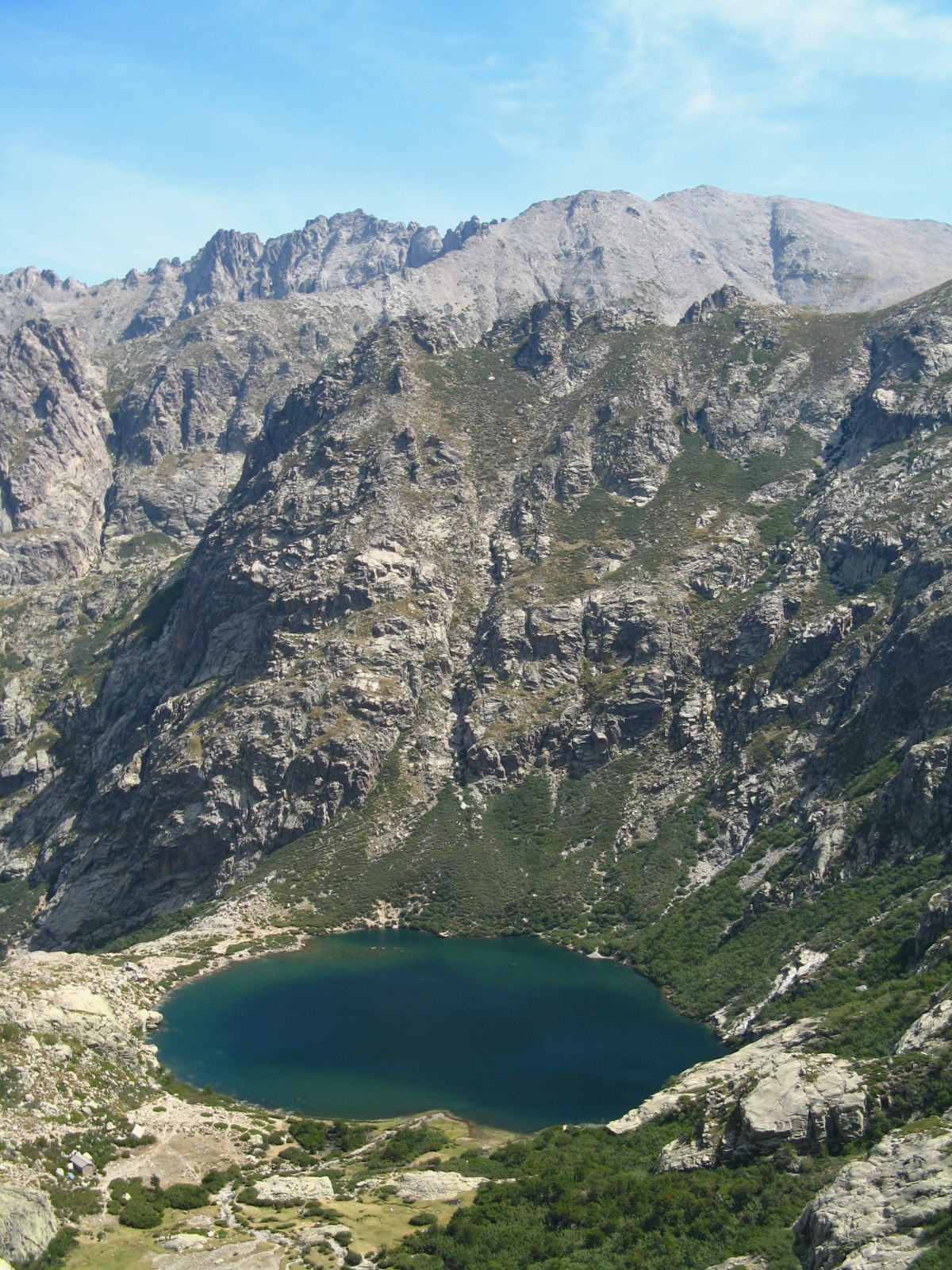

- Location within Corsica
- Location: Corte, Haute-Corse
- Coordinates: 42°12′47″N 9°1′21″E
- Lake type: glacial
- Primary outflows: Restonica
- Basin countries: France
- Surface area: 0.065 km^{2} (0.025 sq mi)
- Max. depth: 20 m (66 ft)
- Surface elevation: 1,710 m (5,610 ft)

Lac de Melu is a lake in Corsica, France. At an elevation of 1,710 metres (5,610 ft), its surface area is 0.065 square kilometres (0.025 mi^{2}). The lake is the source of the Restonica River.

It is close to Lac de Capitellu, in the commune of Corte.

A new bacterial species, Polynucleobacter meluiroseus, was discovered in the lake and also named after the lake.
