= Eastmountainsouth =

Pop band

- Origin: Los Angeles, California, United States
- Genres: Pop, rock
- Years active: 1999–2004
- Label: DreamWorks Records
- Members: Kat Maslich; Peter Bradley Adams

Eastmountainsouth was an American pop rock duo formed in 1999 composed of vocalists Kat Maslich-Bode and Peter Bradley Adams.

The duo released their self-titled debut album in 2003 after signing a deal with DreamWorks Records. It was their only album as they parted ways after its release. Both have released work on solo projects since their split in 2004.

Several of the duo's songs have been used in films and television episodes. Their cover of Stephen Foster's song "Hard Times (Come Again No More)" was featured on the Elizabethtown film soundtrack. The track "So Are You To Me" was featured on the soundtrack of the movie Lucky 7 and appeared in the episode "Truth Takes Time" of the television series Alias. Their song "You Dance" was featured in a first-season episode of the television series One Tree Hill, and the song "Ghost" was used in a fifth-season episode of Dawson's Creek. Another song, "All the Stars", was featured in the TV series Smallville.

In 2003, the duo opened for Lucinda Williams, Tracy Chapman and Nelly Furtado.
