= Tralonca =

- Commune
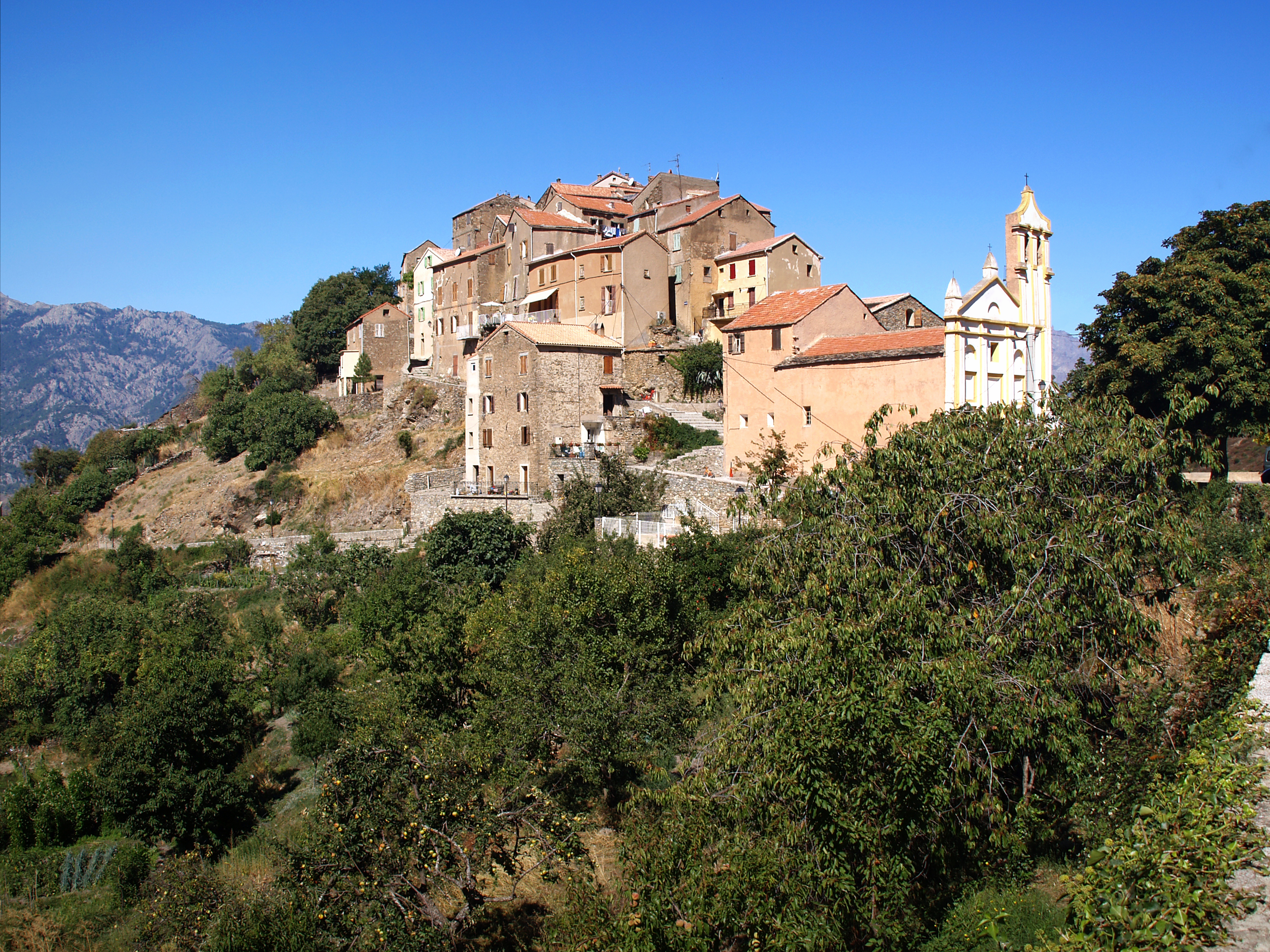
- The village of Tralonca
- Location of Tralonca
- Location within France Location within Corsica
- Coordinates: 42°20′39″N 9°12′26″E
- Country: France
- Region: Corsica
- Department: Haute-Corse
- Arrondissement: Corte
- Canton: Golo-Morosaglia

Government
  - Mayor (2020–2026): Félicie Mazzacami
- Area^{1}: 15.7 km^{2} (6.1 sq mi)
- Elevation: 756 m (2,480 ft)
- Highest elevation: 1,464 m (4,803 ft)
- Lowest elevation: 410 m (1,350 ft)
- Population (2023): 118
  - Density: 7.52/km^{2} (19.5/sq mi)
- Time zone: UTC+01:00 (CET)
  - Summer (DST): UTC+02:00 (CEST)
- INSEE/Postal code: 2B329 /20250
- ^{1} French Land Register data, which excludes lakes, ponds, glaciers > 1 km^{2} (0.386 sq mi or 247 acres) and river estuaries.

Tralonca is a commune in the Haute-Corse department of France on the island of Corsica.

== Population ==
Historical population
| Year | Pop. | ±% p.a. |
|---|---|---|
| 1968 | 92 | — |
| 1975 | 73 | −3.25% |
| 1982 | 74 | +0.19% |
| 1990 | 48 | −5.27% |
| 1999 | 64 | +3.25% |
| 2007 | 90 | +4.35% |
| 2012 | 102 | +2.53% |
| 2017 | 110 | +1.52% |
| 2023 | 118 | +1.18% |
Source: INSEE

== See also ==
- Communes of the Haute-Corse department
