= Col de Marsolino =

Mountain pass in Corsica, France

- Bocca di Marsulinu (Corsican)
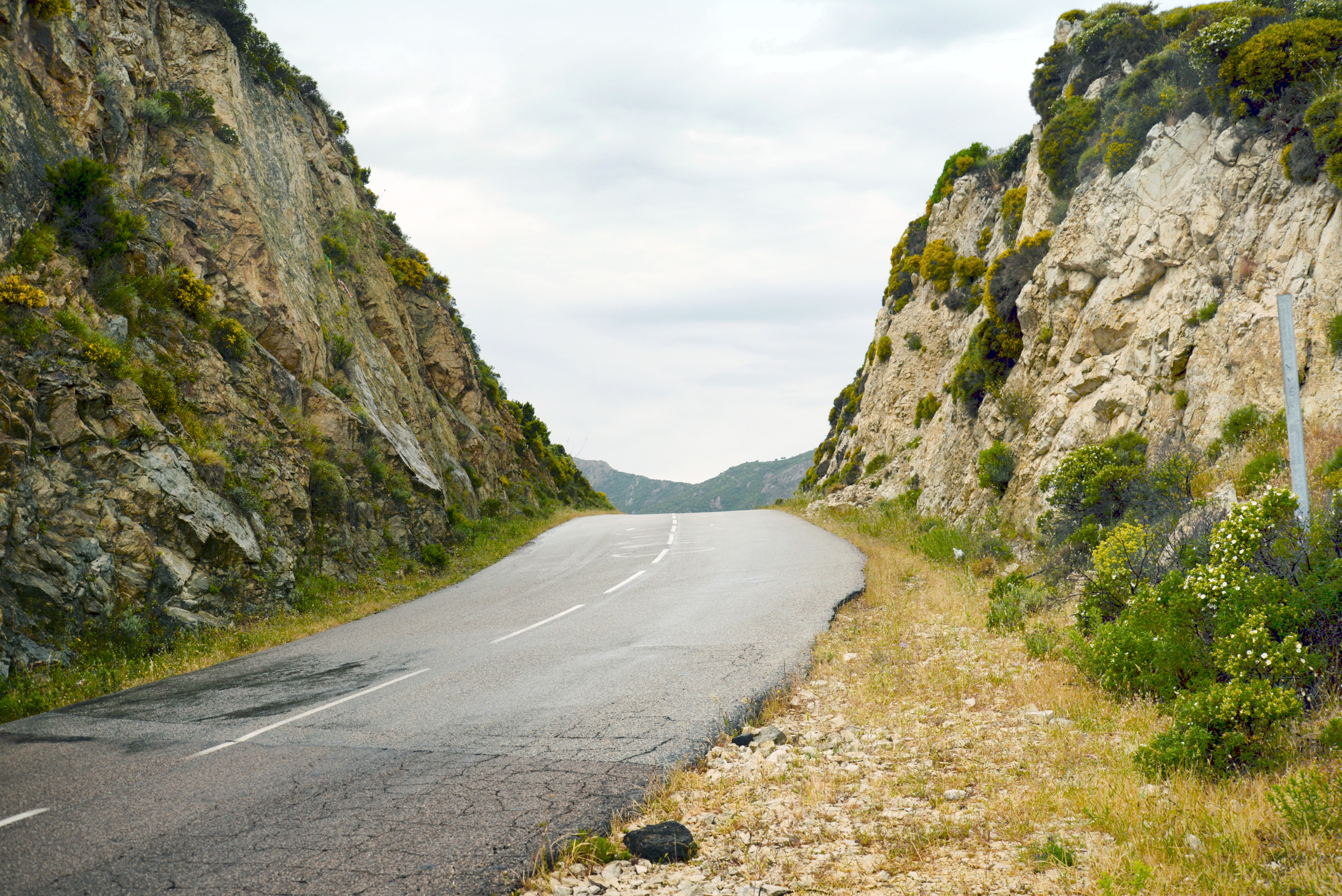

- Location within Corsica Location within France
- Elevation: 443 metres (1,453 ft)

First Approach
- Length: 12.1 kilometres (7.5 mi)
- Traversed by: D81
- Avg gradient: 3.5% %
- Max gradient: 13% %
- Ascent from: Pont des Cinq Arcades (Galéria), Figarella valley (northeast)

Second Approach
- Length: 4.5 kilometres (2.8 mi)
- Traversed by: D81
- Avg gradient: 6.7% %
- Max gradient: 14% %
- Ascent from: Suare (Calenzana), Marsolino valley (southwest)

Third Approach
- Range: Monte Cinto Massif
- Coordinates: 42.47590°N 8.75673°E

The Col de Marsolino (Corsican: Bocca di Marsolinu) is a mountain pass in the Haute-Corse department of Corsica, France. The pass is in the west of the Monte Cinto Massif. It connects Calvi and Calenzana to Galéria. Its low altitude allows it to be open almost all year round.

== Toponymy ==
The pass takes its name from the ancient parish of Armito-Marsolino which covered the upper Ruisseau de Marsulinu valley.

== Geography ==
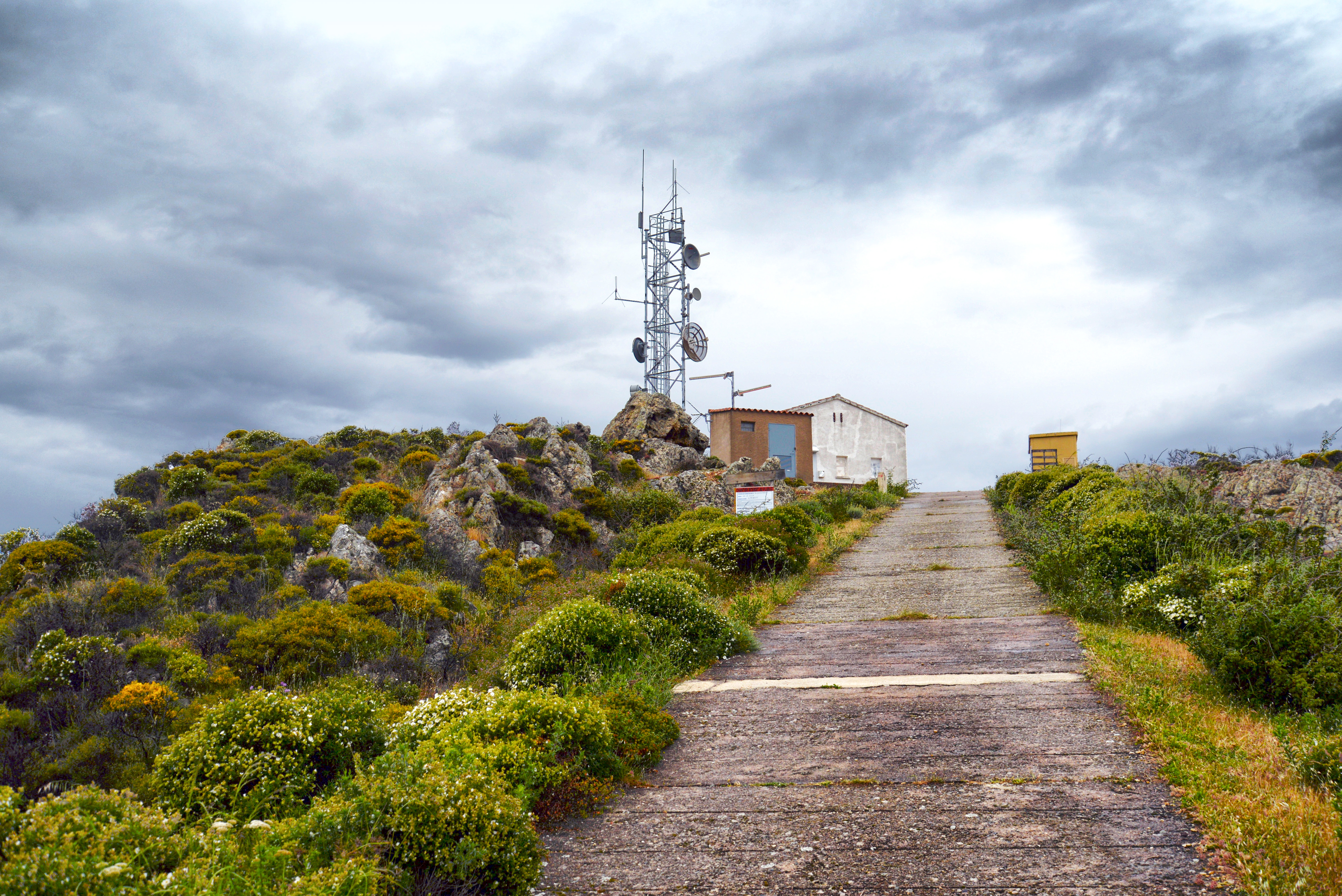
Marsolino pylon

The Marsolino Pass is located on a secondary mountain range in the Monte Cinto Massif, joining the main chain of the island at the 2,148 metres (7,047 ft) Muvrella. The range extends west to the sea at Punta di Ciuttone north of the Gulf of Galeria.

It separates the valley of the Ruisseau de Pinzutella stream (Ronca river), a tributary of the Figarella to the north, from the valley of the Ruisseau de Marsolinu, a tributary of the Fango river to the south. It is an entrance to the regional natural park of Corsica.

Its altitude is 443 metres (1,453 ft). It is located on the only major road in the west of the island: the D81 (formerly RN 199) connecting Calvi to Vico (109 kilometres (68 mi)) and Ajaccio (154 kilometres (96 mi)).

A pylon supporting telecommunications antennas is installed about twenty meters above the pass.

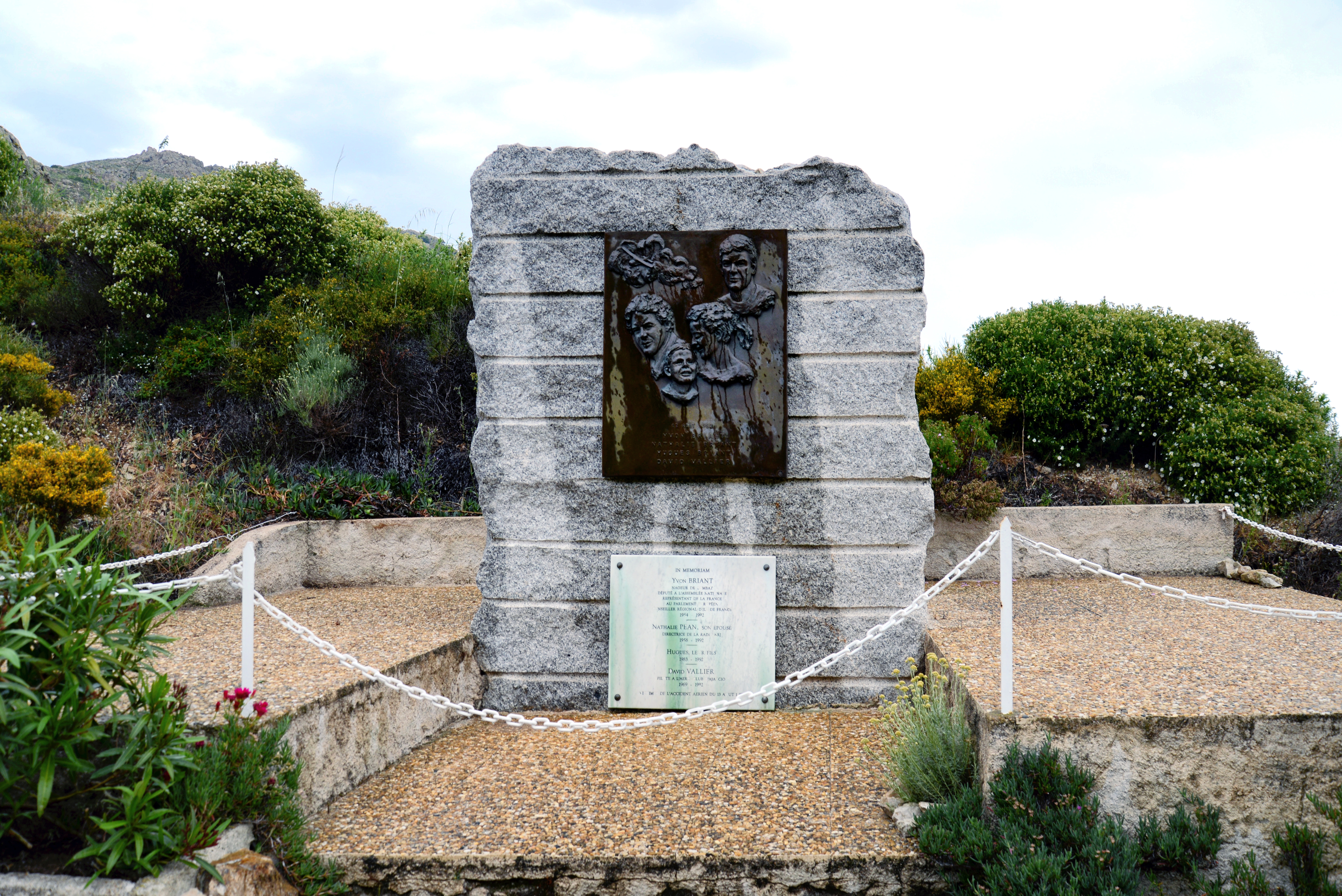
Yvon Briant Memorial

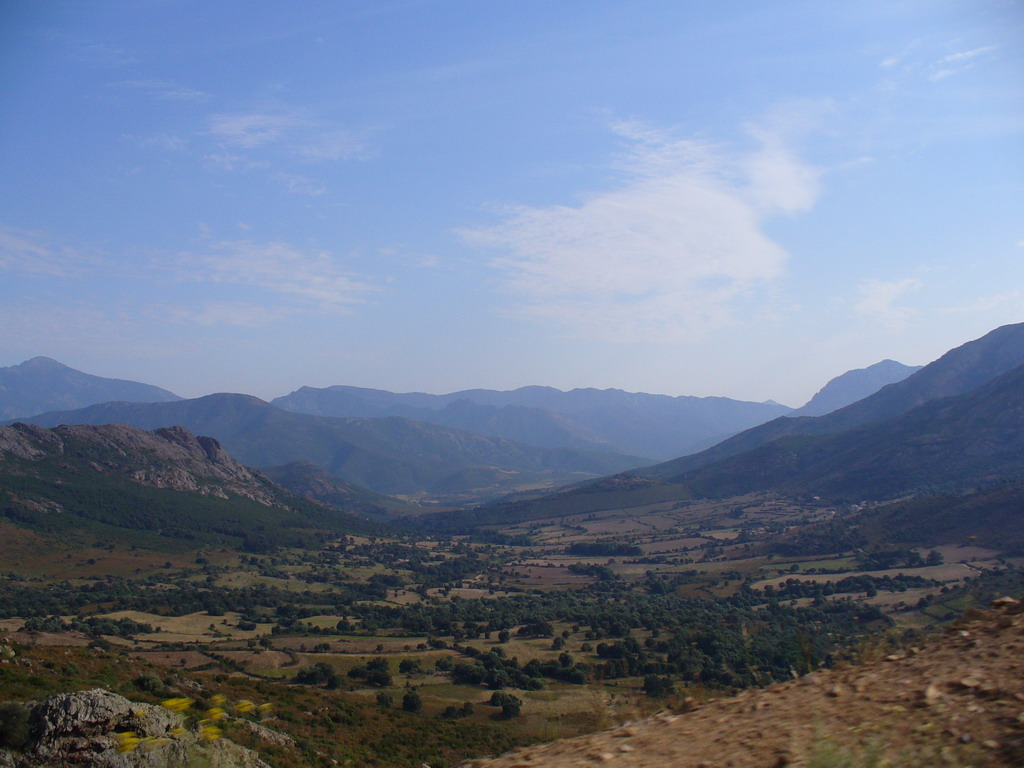
View to the Marsolinu valley (south)

== Events ==
On August 13, 1992, a plane crash occurred at the pass, killing all four occupants of the aircraft: David Vallier, a pilot practicing at the Ajaccio Air Club, and three passengers, Yvon Briant, Member of the Assembly. Nathalie Péan his wife, director of NRJ radio, and Hugues their son.

== Cycling ==
The Col de Marsolino was part of the Tour de France for the first time in 2013, during the 3rd stage. It was classified as a 2nd category climb. The Frenchman Pierre Rolland took the lead at the top.

== Sources ==
- "Bocca di Marsolinu", geoportail, IGN
- "Node: Col de Marsolino (299830745)", OpenStreetMap
- "Rivière a Ronca", Sandre (in French)
- "Ruisseau de Marsolinu", Sandre (in French)
