= List of mountains in Corsica by height =

This article lists the mountains of Corsica by height and by prominence.

Corsica contains seven massifs: Monte Cinto Massif, Monte Rotondo Massif, Monte Renoso Massif, Monte Incudine Massif, Monte San Petrone Massif, Monte Astu Massif, and Monte Stello Massif.

Name	Elevation		Prominence		Massif
Name	meters	feet	meters	feet	Massif
Monte Cinto	2,706	8,878	2,706	8,878	Monte Cinto
Monte Rotondo	2,622	8,602	0	0	Monte Rotondo
Punta Mufrena	2,590	8,500	0	0	Monte Rotondo
Capo al Berdato	2,583	8,474	163	535	Monte Cinto
Capu Biancu	2,562	8,406	140	460	Monte Cinto
Punta Minuta	2,556	8,386	176	577	Monte Cinto
Capu Falu	2,540	8,330	115	377	Monte Cinto
Paglia Orba	2,525	8,284	530	1,740	Monte Cinto
Capu Larghia	2,503	8,212	98	322	Monte Cinto
Maniccia	2,496	8,189	0	0	Monte Rotondo
Monte Cardo	2,453	8,048	0	0	Monte Rotondo
Punta Felicina	2,437	7,995	0	0	Monte Rotondo
Monte d'Oro	2,390	7,840	0	0	Monte Rotondo
Monte Padro	2,389	7,838	545	1,788	Monte Cinto
Monte Renoso	2,352	7,717	0	0	Monte Renoso
Punta Muzzella	2,342	7,684	0	0	Monte Rotondo
Capu Tafunatu	2,335	7,661	192	630	Monte Cinto
