= Capu Tafunatu =

Mountain on the island of Corsica, France

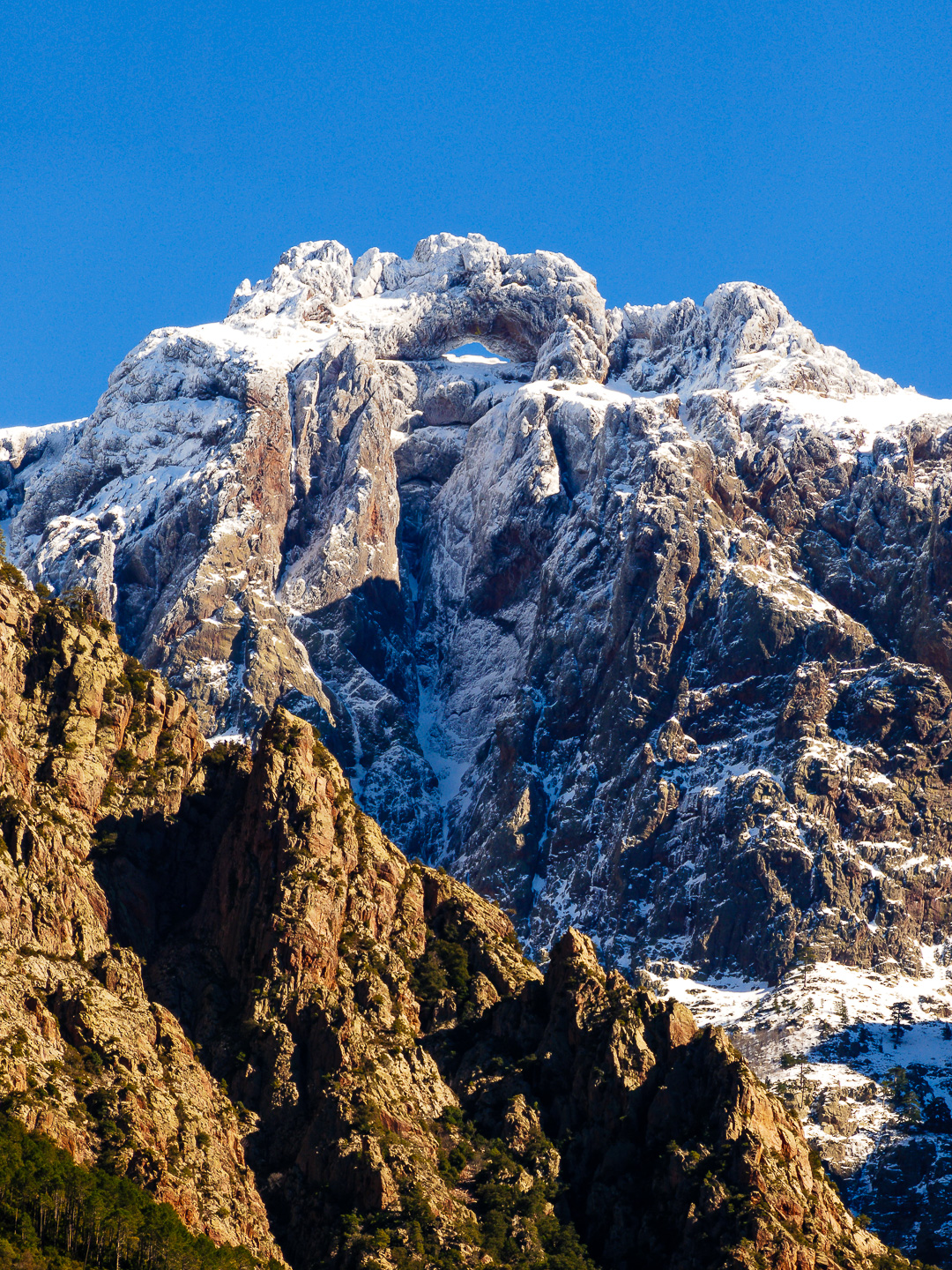
- West face of Capu Tafunatu in winter

Highest point
- Elevation: 2,335 m (7,661 ft)
- Coordinates: 42°20′27″N 8°52′06″E

Geography
- Location within Corsica
- Country: France
- Department: Haute-Corse
- Parent range: Monte Cinto Massif

Geology
- Rock type: Rocks: rhyolite

Climbing
- Easiest route: Northern ridge from the refuge de Ciòttulu à i Mori (PD +)

The Capu Tafunatu is a mountain in the department of Haute-Corse on the island of Corsica, France. It rises to an altitude of 2,335 metres (7,661 ft) in the Niolo piève in the northwest of the island. Located in the Monte Cintu massif near the Paglia Orba, it rises southeast of Manso on the edge of the commune of Albertacce.

Capu Tafunatu literally means "perforated head". The top of the mountain is pierced by an opening 55 metres (180 ft) wide by 16 metres (52 ft), making it the largest natural arch in France.

== Geology ==
Capu Tafunatu consists of alkaline rhyolite with ignimbrite facies, an igneous rock of the Monte Cinto annular volcano-plutonic complex, formed in the Permian.

The formation of the "hole" is explained by tectonics. The inclined plane at the base of this cavity is an oblique fault which, intersecting the rocky blade of the summit, weakened it and caused it to collapse.

== In popular culture ==
Georges-Louis Leclerc, Comte de Buffon (1707–1788), in Histoire et théorie de la terre (History and Theory of the Earth), hypothesizes that Corsica is a mountain peak of the sunken continent of Atlantis. It was at this time that this legend was told:

At the time when Saint Martin was tending the flocks in the meadows of Niolo, he received a visit from a stranger who asked him to enter his service. The latter seemed needy, so the saint hired him. During the first night when he shared his hut with his servant, he noticed that he gave off a strong smell of sulfur while sleeping. The next morning, Martin told the shepherd that he had guessed his true identity and that he could not keep him in his service. The devil flew into a violent rage. So he went away, determined to stay in the area and give Saint Martin a formidable competitor.

The devil, who knew well how to disguise his wicked person, went to find the head of the village of Niolo. He offered to build him a bridge over the Golo in exchange for the ownership of a soul to be chosen from his village. But the village head went to seek advice from Saint Martin. A few hours later, when the devil reappeared the village head gave his agreement but the bridge had to be completely built in one night, that is to say, before the rooster crowed. The satanic engineer set to work, all night long a dreadful din was heard near the Golo, the bridge was almost finished as the thousands of devils called by Satan to his aid had put ardor into their work.

In the midst of this darkness made feverish by the infernal tumult, a man walked calmly and peacefully, and contemplated the work carried out. Only one stone remained to be laid, the keystone of the Bridge. Then the man pulled out a rooster from under his coat. The rooster stretched and began to crow. A cry of rage came from the ranks of the workers of hell. In turn, the devil let out a terrible roar and threw his useless tool into the air. The hammer struck the "Capo Tafonato", (the holed mountain) which it passed through from side to side. And this is how the devil's hole was dug, at the precise moment when Lucifer disappeared.

== Access ==
Different routes allow the ascent to the "hole" of Capu Tafunatu, at about 2,200 metres (7,200 ft), from the refuge of Ciottulu a i Mori. All require great caution (risk of fatal falls) but remain practicable without special equipment for people in good physical condition and not prone to vertigo.

The normal route "ranks at the upper limit of what non-climbers can face". It begins at the Moorish Pass and uses a system of low-sloping rocky outcrops (vires) that run on the east face of Capu Tafunatu: first to the south and then over whitish rocks, heading north to the plateau where the cavity opens.

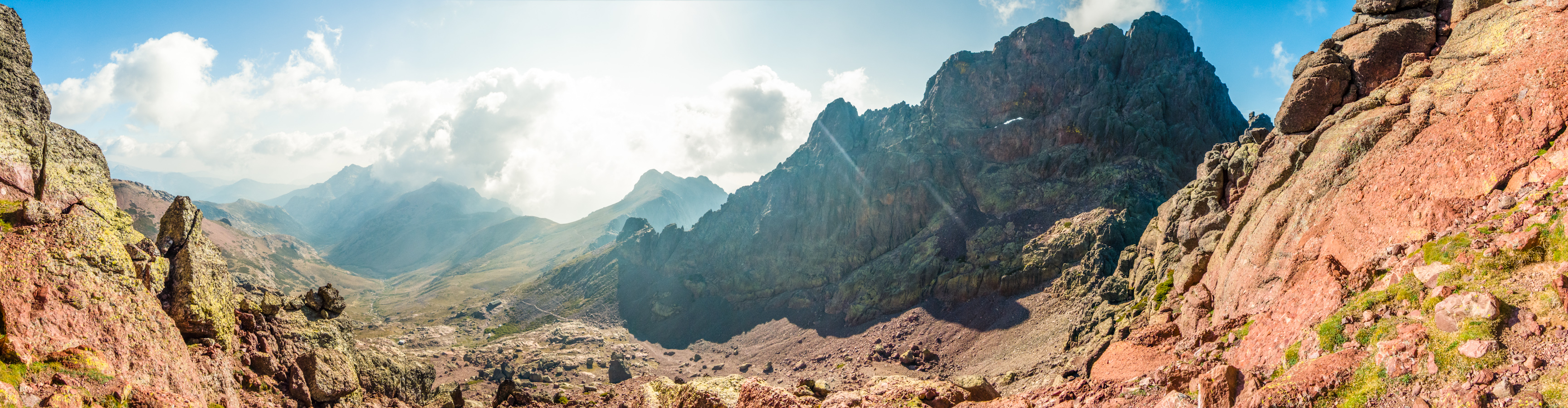
Panoramic photo of Capu Tafunatu (east face, in the shade) and the Col des Maures (Moorish Pass), above the Ciottulu a i Mori refuge in the upper Golo Valley. One can distinguish in the wall the turns of the normal access route leading to the "hole".

== Climbing ==
Access to the main summit of Capu Tafunatu, altitude 2,335 metres (7,661 ft), requires "PD (peu difficile) sup." climbing skills, a rate that indicates "small difficulties [...] requiring the use of the rope" ). From the platform on the east face where the "hole" opens, a ledge crosses the north ridge, then returns to the west face towards a chimney (vertical fracture, listed II) which is climbed 12 metres (39 ft) up to near the summit ridge, to finish with a short climb (vertical slab, grade III) to the summit.

Several climbing routes rated “AD” (Assez difficile: Fairly difficult) to “TD" (Très difficile: Very difficult) climb the east and west faces. Their approach is respectively from the Col des Maures and the Fango valley.

== Gallery ==
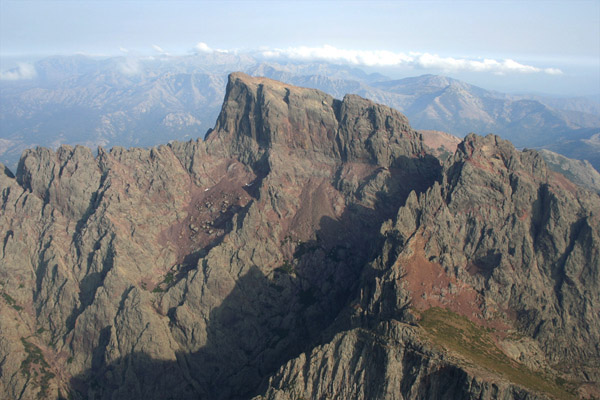
Paglia Orba (center) and Capu Tafunatu (right)

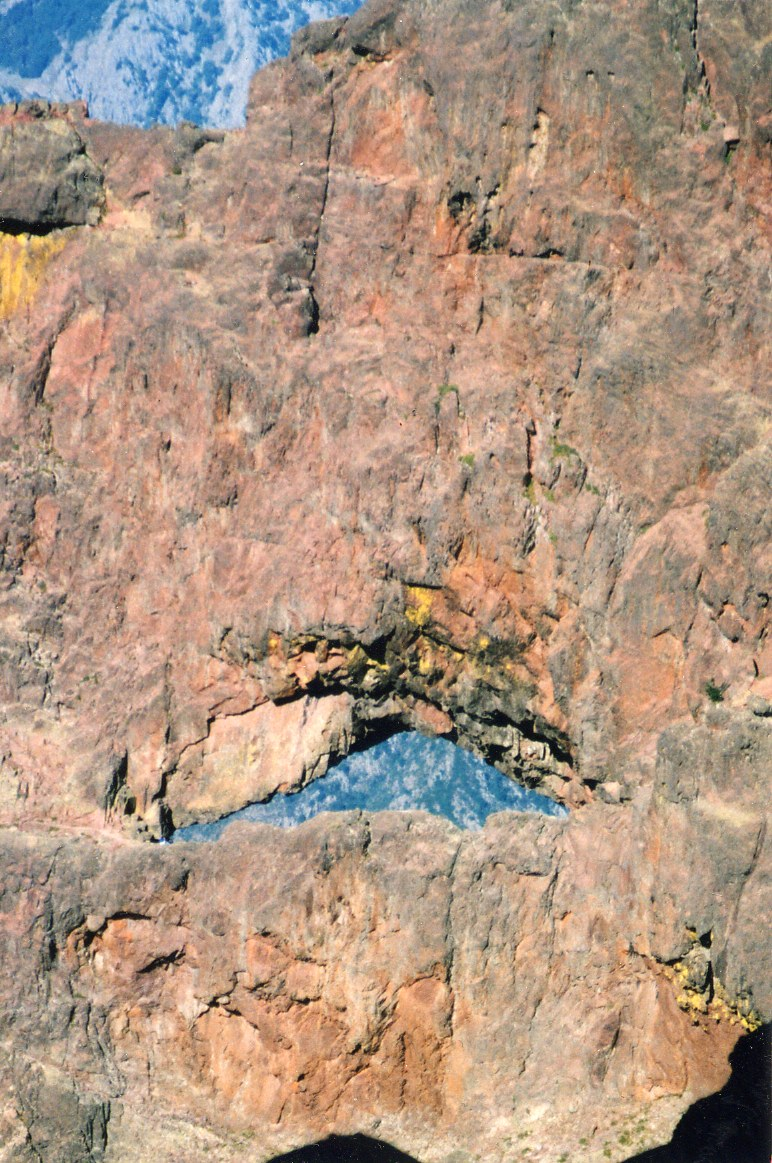
The arch of Capu Tafunatu seen from the Paglia Orba

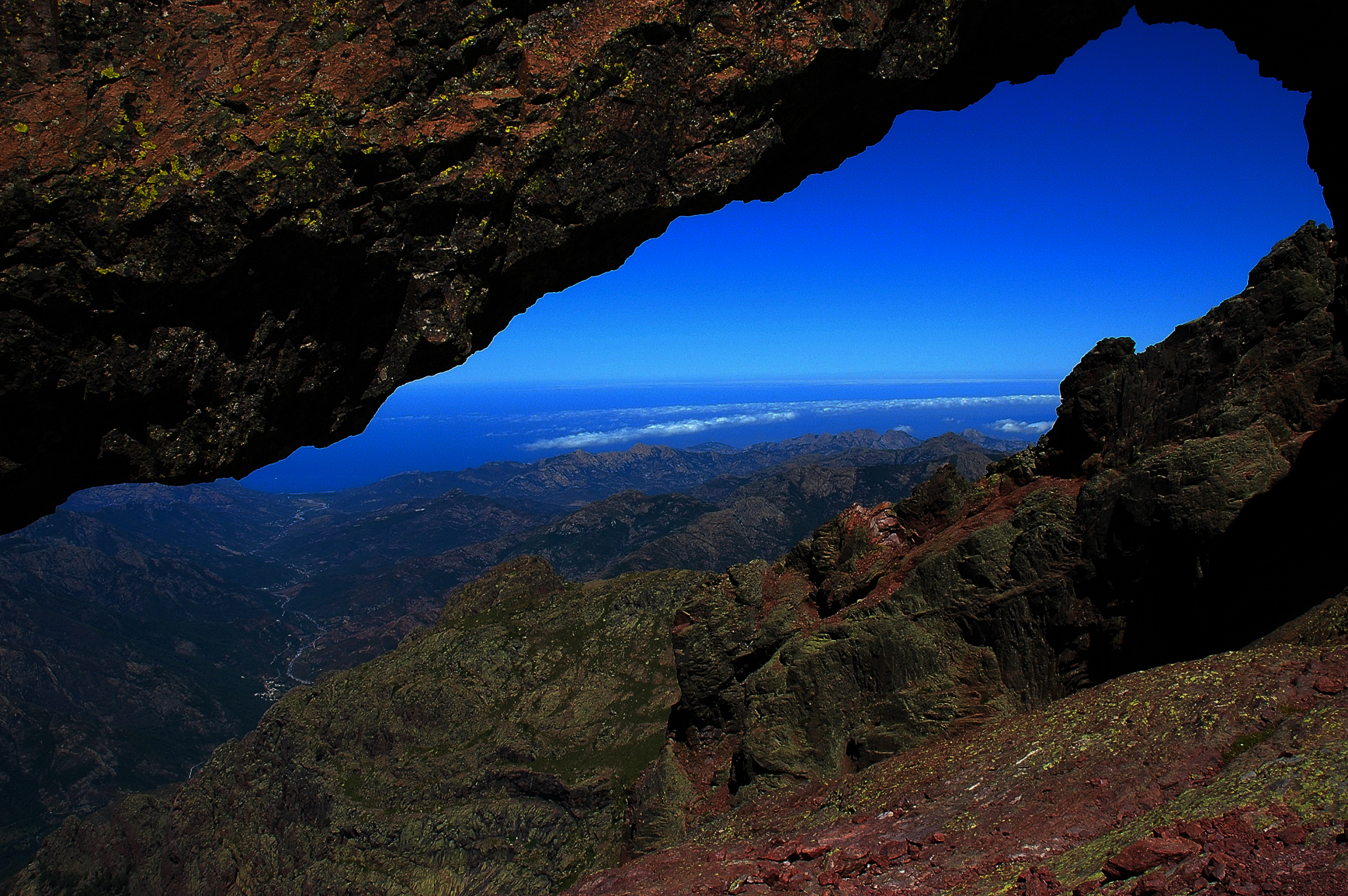
The Fango Valley from the arch of Capu Tafunatu

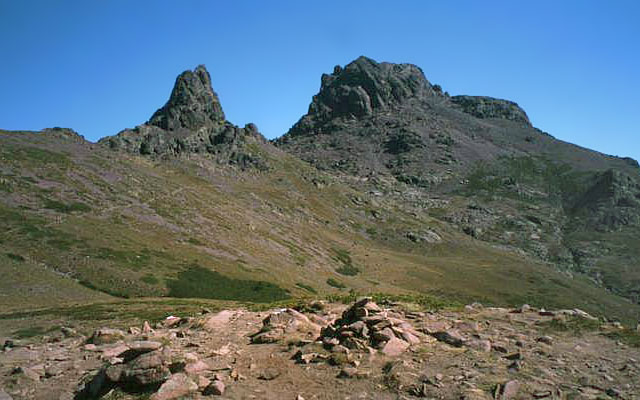
Capu Tafunatu (left) and Paglia Orba

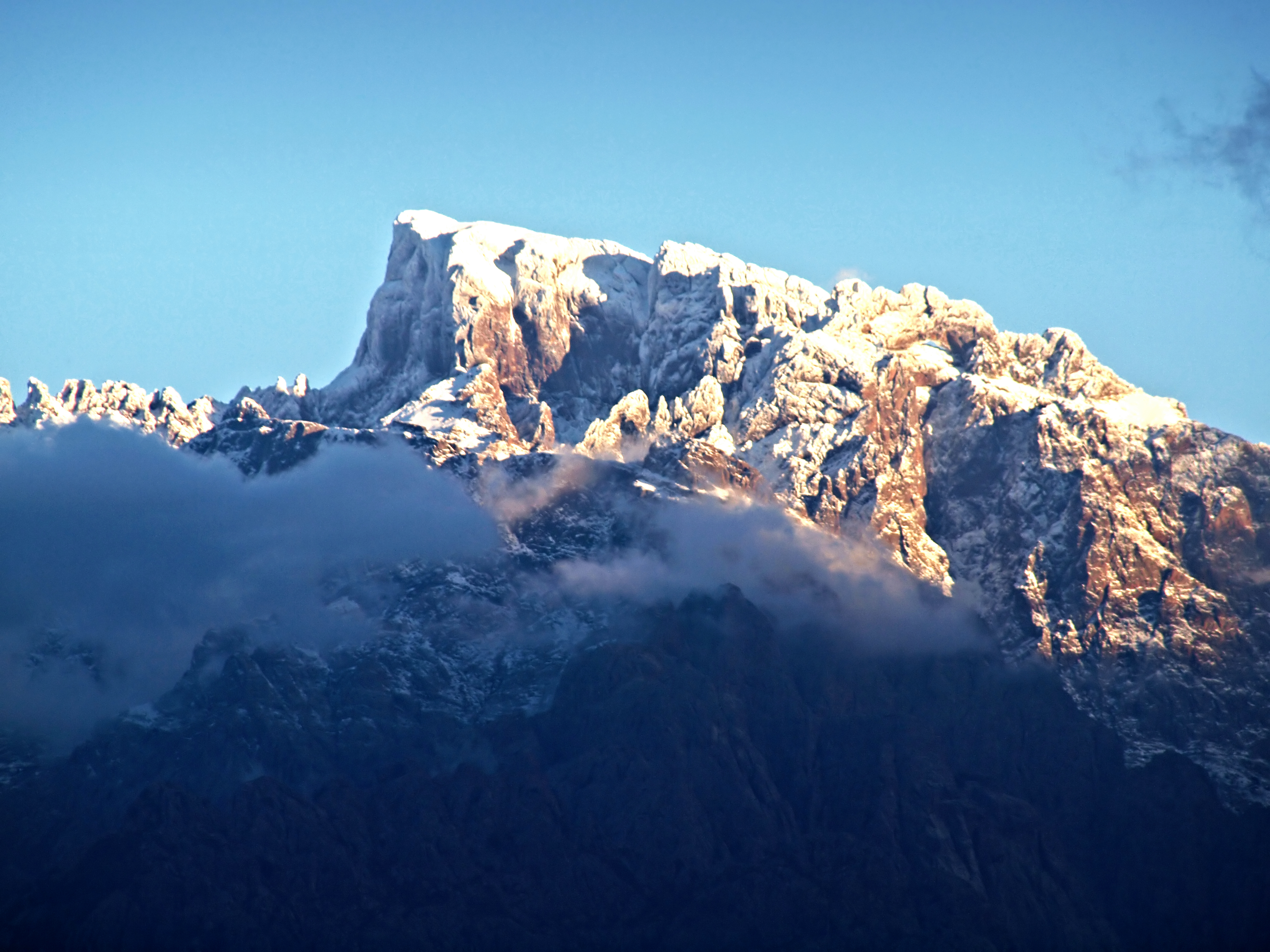
Capu Tafunatu to the right of Paglia Orba seen from Galéria

== Sources ==
- "Capu Tafunatu", Géoportail (in French)
- Culture Corse
- "De nouveaux relevés métriques au Tafunatu", Corse Matin (in French), 6 September 2010, archived from the original on 2021-05-18
- Fabrikant, Michel (1982), Guide des montagnes corses : Randonnées pédestres et escalades, Cartes et guides de Corse, Grenoble: Didier Richard, p. 408, ISBN 978-2-7038-0018-7
- Gauthier, Alain (2015), Corse, l'Élysée du Géologue, Aiacciu i.e. Ajaccio: Albiana, p. 232, ISBN 978-2-8241-0632-8
- Souffache, Blaise; Gauthier, Alain (1993), "Le Capu Tavunatu (Haute Corse), un essai brésilien naturel en tectonique cassante" (PDF), Travaux scientifiques du parc naturel régional et des réserves naturelles de Corse (in French), 41: 63–86, ISSN 0246-1579
- Vellutini, P.J.; Rossi, P-; Michon, G.; Hervé, J.Y (1996), "Carte géologique de la France à 1/50000 : Galeria-Osani" (PDF), Infoterre (in French), BRGM
