= Fango (river) =

River in the department of Haute-Corse, Corsica

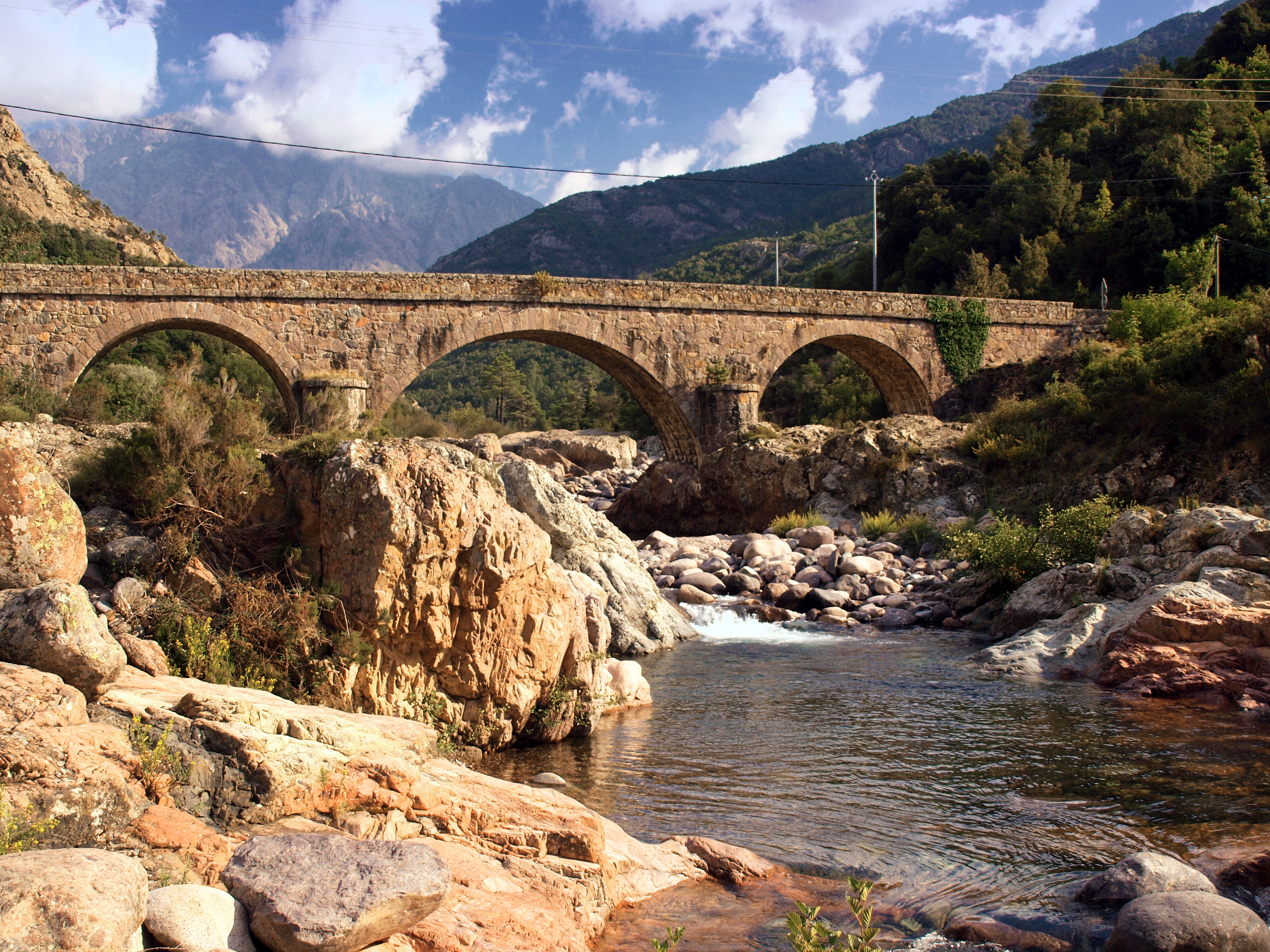
- Fango: Pont de Manso

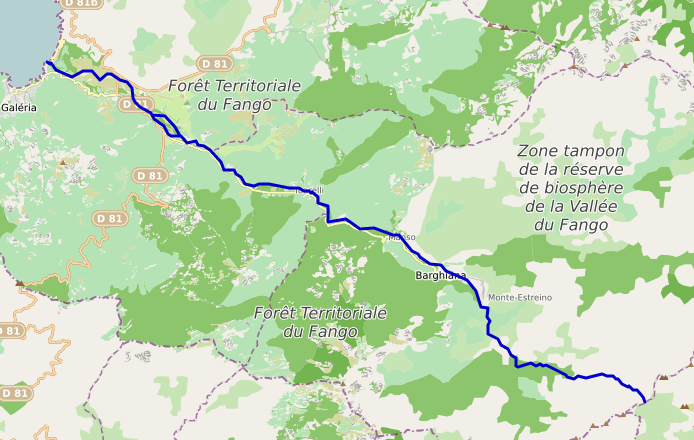
- Course of the Fango

- Location within Corsica Location within France

Location
- Country: France
- Region: Corsica
- Department: Haute-Corse

Physical characteristics
- Mouth: Tyrrhenian Sea
  - coordinates: 42.4196°N 8.6582°E

The Fango (Corsican: Fangu) is a small coastal river in the department of Haute-Corse, Corsica, France. The Fango Valley was designated a biosphere reserve in 1977. It holds flora and fauna representative of all regions of Corsica from the coast to the highest mountains.

== Course ==
The Fango is 22.72 kilometres (14.12 mi) long. It crosses the communes of Galéria and Manso. The watershed of the river covers 235 kilometres (146 mi). It extends from Galéria to the Paglia Orba and from the Col de Marsolino to the Col de Palmarella.

The Fango rises in the commune of Manso to the west of the 2,335 metres (7,661 ft) Capo Tafonatu. Its tributaries drain the ridge line in the Monte Cinto Massif of which the highest point is the 2,556 metres (8,386 ft) Punta Minuta. In its upper reaches it is called the Ruisseau de Capu di Vetto. It runs in a northwest direction past Monte-Estreino, Barghana, Manso and Tuarelli to enter the Gulf of Caléria just north of the town of Galéria. From Barghiana to the coast the D351 road follows the river.

== Valley ==
The mouth of the river is biologically very rich, with many birds, amphibians and reptiles. The lower valley holds very old oak forests dominated by holm oak (Quercus ilex). The upper valley is steep and rocky, with evergreen forest and maquis shrubland. The fauna includes Corsican mouflon, bearded vulture and golden eagle. There is a small human population in the valley, numbering 435 in 1990, mainly engaged in animal husbandry and tourism. The Fango Valley was designated a biosphere reserve in 1977, extended and renamed in 1990. In 2020 the reserve was renamed the Falasorma-Dui Sevi Biosphere Reserve. Falasorma is the Corsican language name for the Fango valley, and Dui-Sevi is the region included in the reserve's transition zone.

== Hydrology ==
Measurements of the river flow were taken at the Galéria station from 1976 to 2021. The watershed above this station covers 129 square kilometres (50 sq mi). Annual precipitation was calculated as 538 millimetres (21.2 in). The average flow of water throughout the year was 2.2 cubic metres per second (78 cu ft/s).

Average flow (cubic meters per second) by month for the period 1961 to 1999
Month	Flow
Jan	3.120
Feb	3.000
Mar	2.900
Apr	3.040
May	2.240
Jun	0.998
Jul	0.274
Aug	0.227
Sep	0.634
Oct	2.160
Nov	4.020
Dec	3.820

== Tributaries ==
The following streams (ruisseaux) are tributaries of the Fango (ordered by length) and sub-tributaries:

- Marsolinu 12 km (7.5 mi)
  - Prezzuna 11 km (6.8 mi)
    - Culombu 5 km (3.1 mi)
    - Rimboli 2 km (1.2 mi)
      - Melone 2 km (1.2 mi)
      - Fuglietu 1 km (0.62 mi)
    - Polgge 2 km (1.2 mi)
    - Scala 2 km (1.2 mi)
    - Trea 2 km (1.2 mi)
    - Cannosa 2 km (1.2 mi)
    - Piaggiola 1 km (0.62 mi)
  - Finocchie 6 km (3.7 mi)
    - Ficaccia 2 km (1.2 mi)
  - Querciu 4 km (2.5 mi)
- Candela 11 km (6.8 mi)
  - Bocca Bianca 8 km (5.0 mi)
    - Taïta 4 km (2.5 mi)
    - Muntunaghiu 4 km (2.5 mi)
    - Sposata 3 km (1.9 mi)
    - Terribule 3 km (1.9 mi)
    - Valle Nera 3 km (1.9 mi)
  - Saltare 3 km (1.9 mi)
    - Laoscella 3 km (1.9 mi)
  - Valle Serrata 2 km (1.2 mi)
- Perticatu 6 km (3.7 mi)
  - Anghione 3 km (1.9 mi)
- Canne 6 km (3.7 mi)
  - Tetti 5 km (3.1 mi)
  - Parma 4 km (2.5 mi)
- Rocce 5 km (3.1 mi)
- Cutalellu 4 km (2.5 mi)
- Buliga 4 km (2.5 mi)
- Bussiccia 4 km (2.5 mi)
- Margine 3 km (1.9 mi)
- Capronale 3 km (1.9 mi)
  - Campottoli Rossi 2 km (1.2 mi)
- Capu Rossu 3 km (1.9 mi)
- Acqua Salsa 2 km (1.2 mi)
- Valle Sarratra 2 km (1.2 mi)
- Forchettaghiu 2 km (1.2 mi)

== Sources ==
- 25 sites rejoignent le Réseau mondial des réserves de biosphère de l’UNESCO (in French), UNESCO, 28 October 2020
- "Corse : le Fango, premier cours d'eau de l'île à bénéficier d'un contrat de rivière", Sauvons l'eau!, 22 January 2014
- "Le Fango à Galéria", eaufrance (in French), Ministère de l'Ecologie, du Développement Durable et de l'Energie
- "Le Fango", Sandre (in French)
- Vallée du Fango (in French), UNESCO
- "Way: Fango (620853731)", OpenStreetMap
