= Punta Minuta =

Mountain in Corsica, France

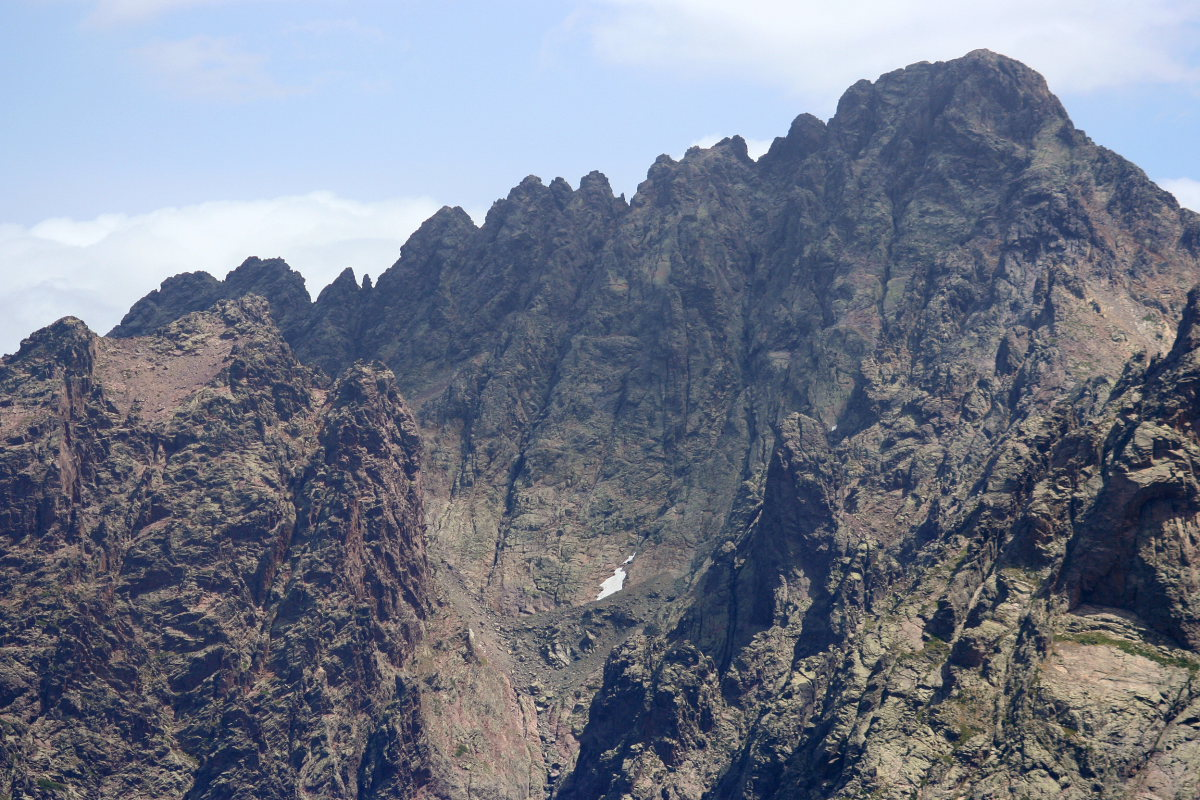
- West face of Punta Minuta

Highest point
- Elevation: 2,556 m (8,386 ft)
- Coordinates: 42.3752°N 8.9139°E

Geography
- Location within Corsica
- Country: France
- Department: Haute-Corse
- Parent range: Monte Cinto Massif

Punta Minuta is a 2,556 metres (8,386 ft) mountain in the department of Haute-Corse on the island of Corsica, France. It is in the Monte Cinto Massif.

== Location ==
The peak is in the commune of Albertacce, just south of the communes of Asco to the northeast and Manso to the northwest. The nearest road is the D147 to the north, which runs northwest from the village of Asco.

== Physical ==
Punta Minuta is 2,556 metres (8,386 ft) high and has a prominence of 176 metres (577 ft). It is isolated by 1.88 kilometres (1.17 mi) from the slopes of its nearest higher neighbor, Monte Cinto. It is in the central chain of the Monte Cinto Massif at a point where a ridge leads east to the 2,706 metres (8,878 ft) Monte Cinto. It is in the Grande Barriere, the crestline that runs from Monte Cinto westward to Paglia Orba. It is northeast of the 2,525 metres (8,284 ft) Paglia Orba.

Punta Minuta is drained to the west by tributaries of the Fango river, to the north by tributaries of the Asco river and to the south by tributaries of the Golo river. The southern side of the mountain is free of snow from May/June until September. The northern side retains snow and ice throughout the year.

== Gallery ==
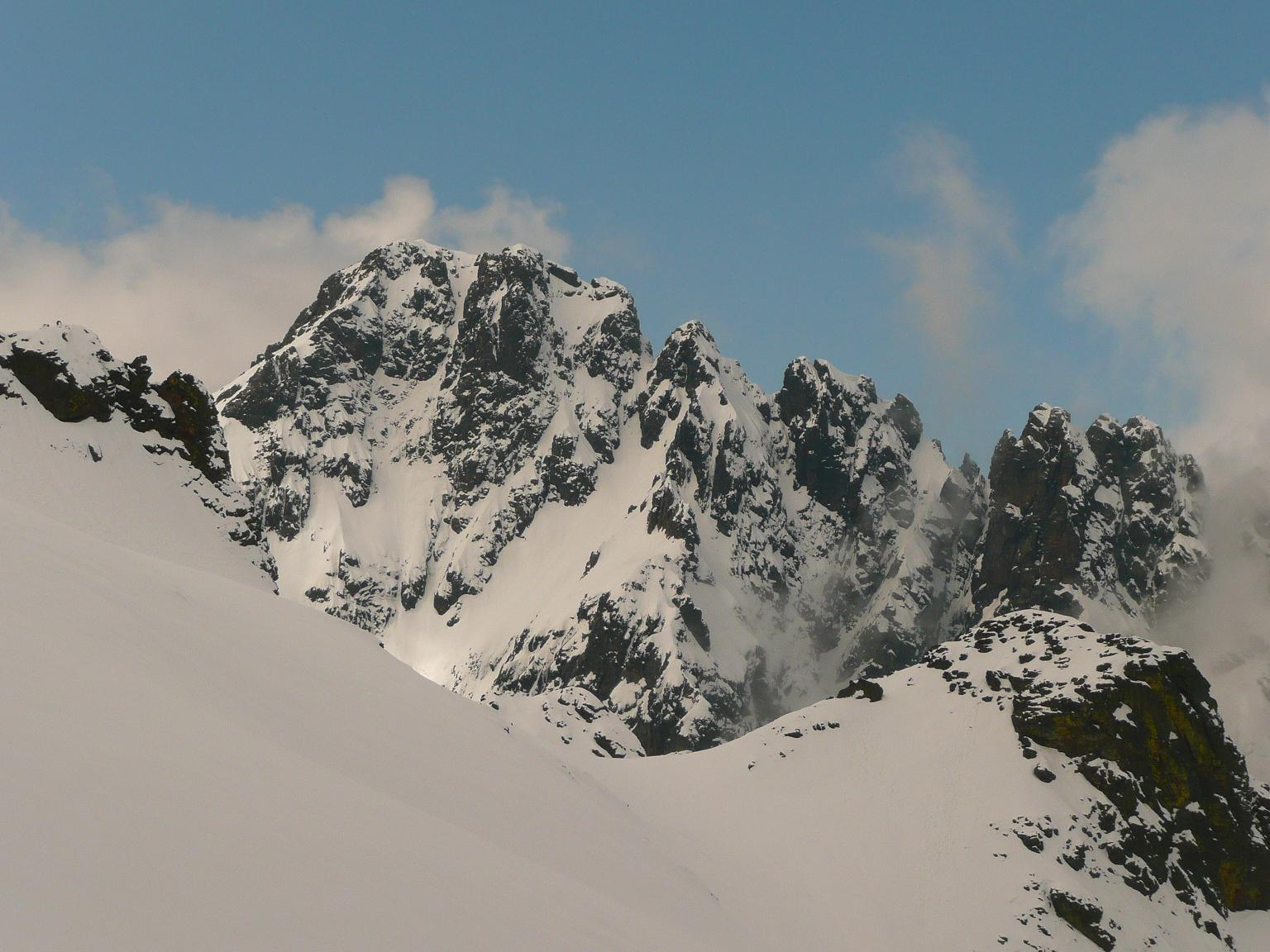
East face of Punta Minuta (from Monte Cinto).

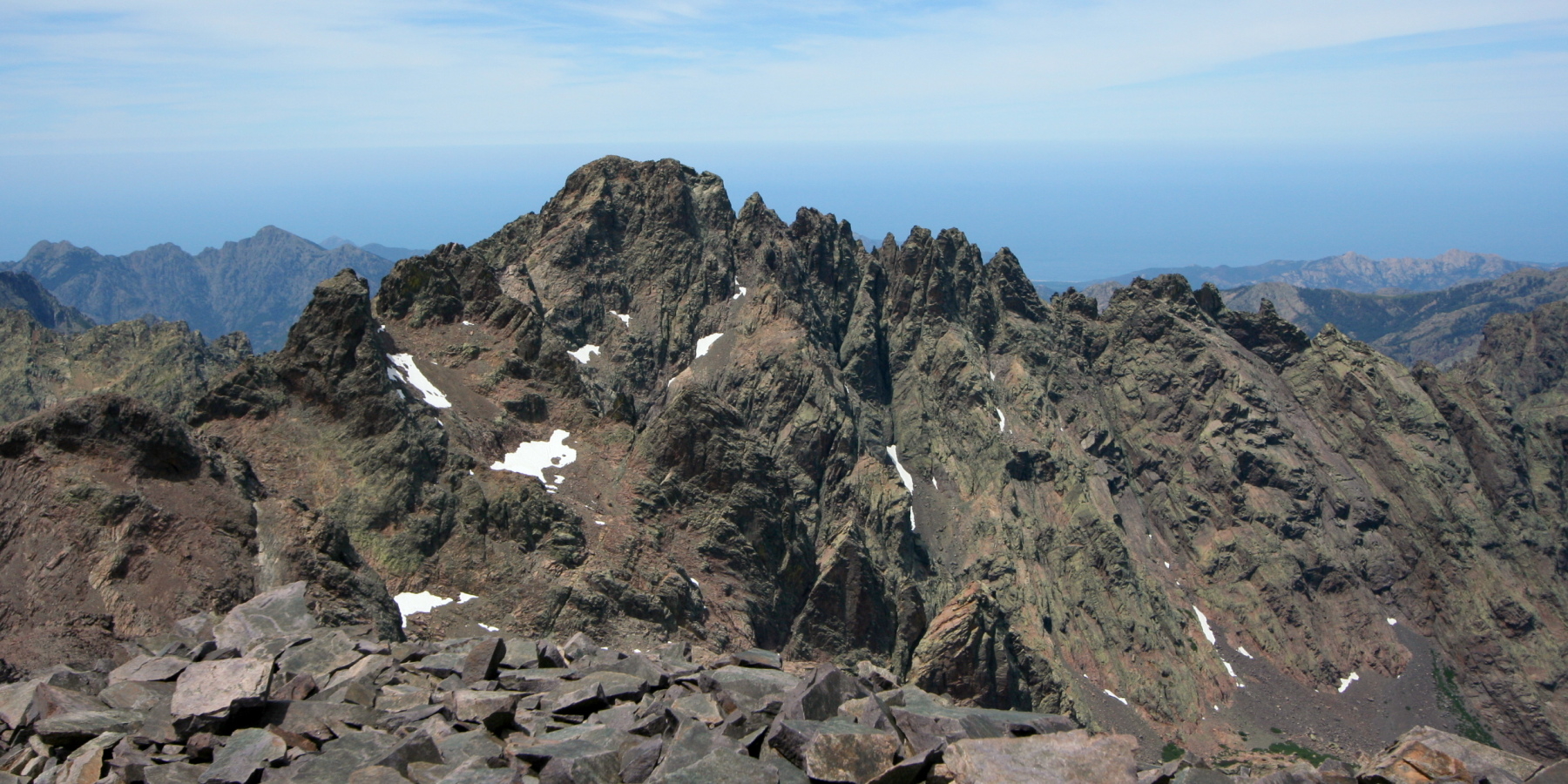
Punta Minuta from near Monte Cinto.

South face of Punta Minuta (from Punta Artica).

== Sources ==
- "Node: Punta Minuta (1366096346)", OpenStreetMap
- "Punta Minuta, France", Peakbagger
- "Punta Minuta", Géoportail
- "Punta Minuta", Summitpost
