= Paglia Orba =

Mountain in Corsica, France

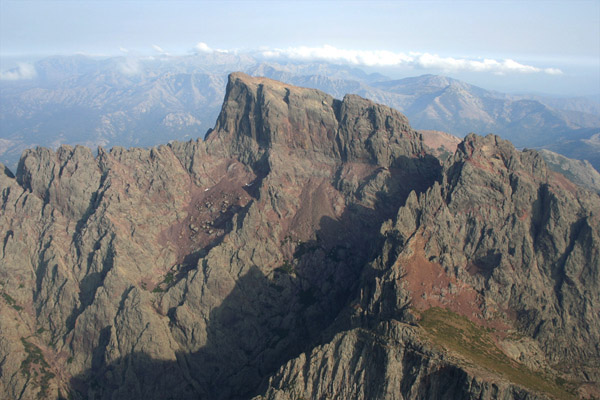
- Summit, with Capu Tafunatu on its right (aerial photo)

Highest point
- Elevation: 2,525 m (8,284 ft)
- Prominence: 530 m (1,740 ft)
- Isolation: 4.6 km (2.9 mi)
- Coordinates: 42°20′33″N 8°52′43″E

Geography
- Location within Corsica
- Country: France
- Department: Haute-Corse
- Parent range: Monte Cinto Massif

Geology
- Rock age: Permian

The (Note: French-language books often treat the name as feminine, but in Corsican it is masculine.) Paglia Orba (pronounced /ˌpa.ʎa ˈɔːr.ba/) is a mountain peak in the Monte Cinto Massif in Corsica. It rises to an altitude of 2,525 metres (8,284 ft), between the valleys of the Golo (in the Niolo) and the Cavicchia (in the Filosorma). Relatively isolated, this peak, notable for its characteristic tooth-shaped silhouette, dominates the Fango Valley and the west coast of the island.

Straddling the municipalities of Albertacce and Manso, Paglia Orba is the second highest peak of the central chain and the Filosorma, behind Punta Minuta at 2,556 metres (8,386 ft).

== Geography ==
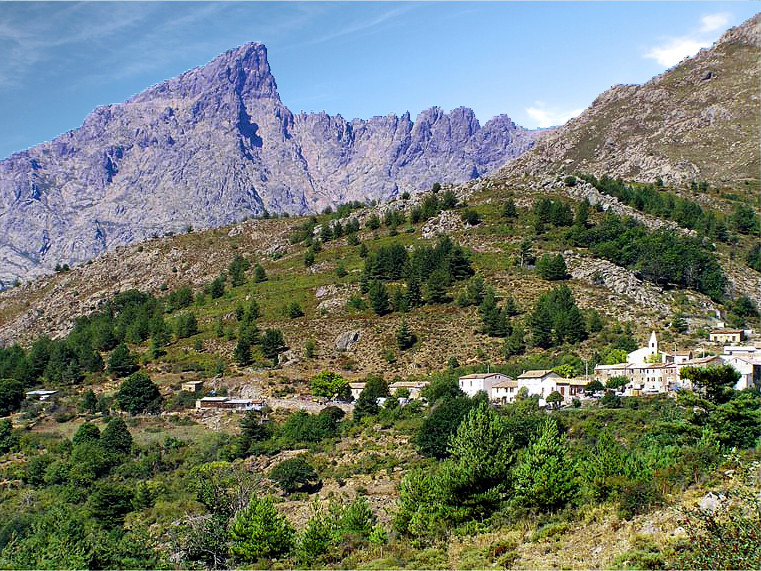
Calasima, at 1,095 metres (3,593 ft) the highest village in Corsica

With an altitude of 2,525 metres (8,284 ft), the Paglia Orba is located in the municipalities of Albertacce and Manso. It is nearly 200 metres (660 ft) lower than Monte Cinto. The Golo, the longest river in Corsica, rises at its feet.

On its slopes at an altitude of 1,384 metres (4,541 ft) the Ruisseau Orba rises in the communal forest of Albertacce, which is a monoculture of laricio pines.

== Geology ==
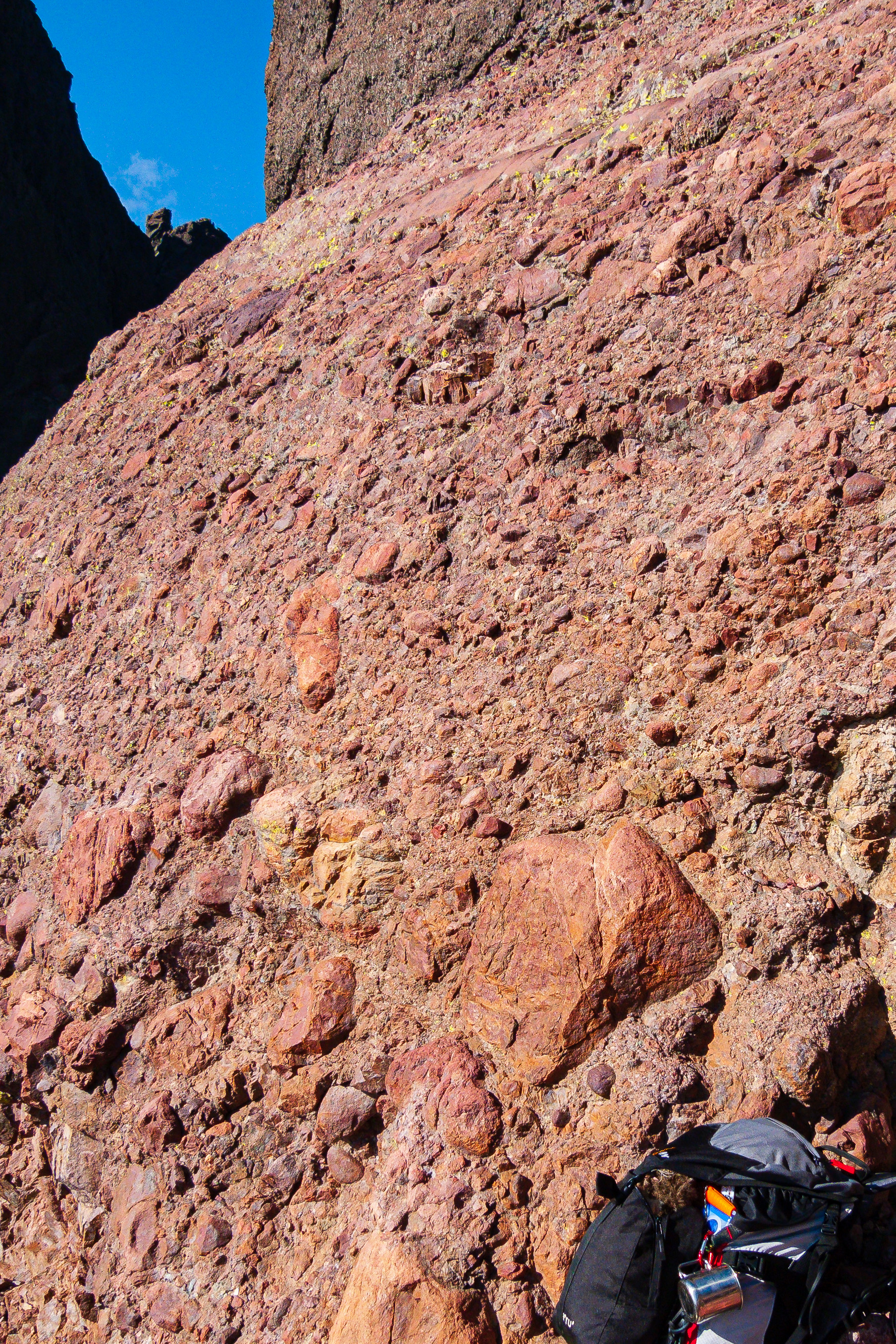
Permian conglomerates and arkosic sandstones of the Paglia Orba

Unlike the other summits of the Cinto massif, which are formed mainly of volcanic rocks, the Paglia Orba is made up of sandstone and conglomerates (puddingstone) with some boulders exceeding 1 cubic metre (35 cu ft) in size.

These sedimentary rocks accumulated during the Permian-Triassic within a vast zone of volcanic collapse (a lake occupying a caldera), before being raised to altitude then largely destroyed by erosion during the tertiary era. Only a few rare vestiges of this sedimentary filling remain today, including the Paglia Orba preserved on the southwestern edge of this caldera.

== Access ==
The normal access road to the summit is somewhere between hiking and mountaineering. From the Ciottulu a i Mori refuge, a path leads to the Col des Maures (Moorish Pass) and then up a very steep corridor on the western slope of the Paglia Orba. The route marked by cairns then overlooks a cliff to reach a first summit, separated from the true summit by a ravine called "combe des Chèvres". Other steep routes exist on the south side (vertical fractures or chimneys) but require experience in climbing.

Experienced hikers and mountaineers can also complete the tour of the Paglia Orba by crossing the "Geologists' Breach", named in memory of a geologist who died there,) and the "Sphinx Breach", near a characteristic looking rock block.

=== Climbing ===
The faces and ridges of this "queen of the Corsican mountains" offer climbers a multitude of routes rated “AD” to “ED”.

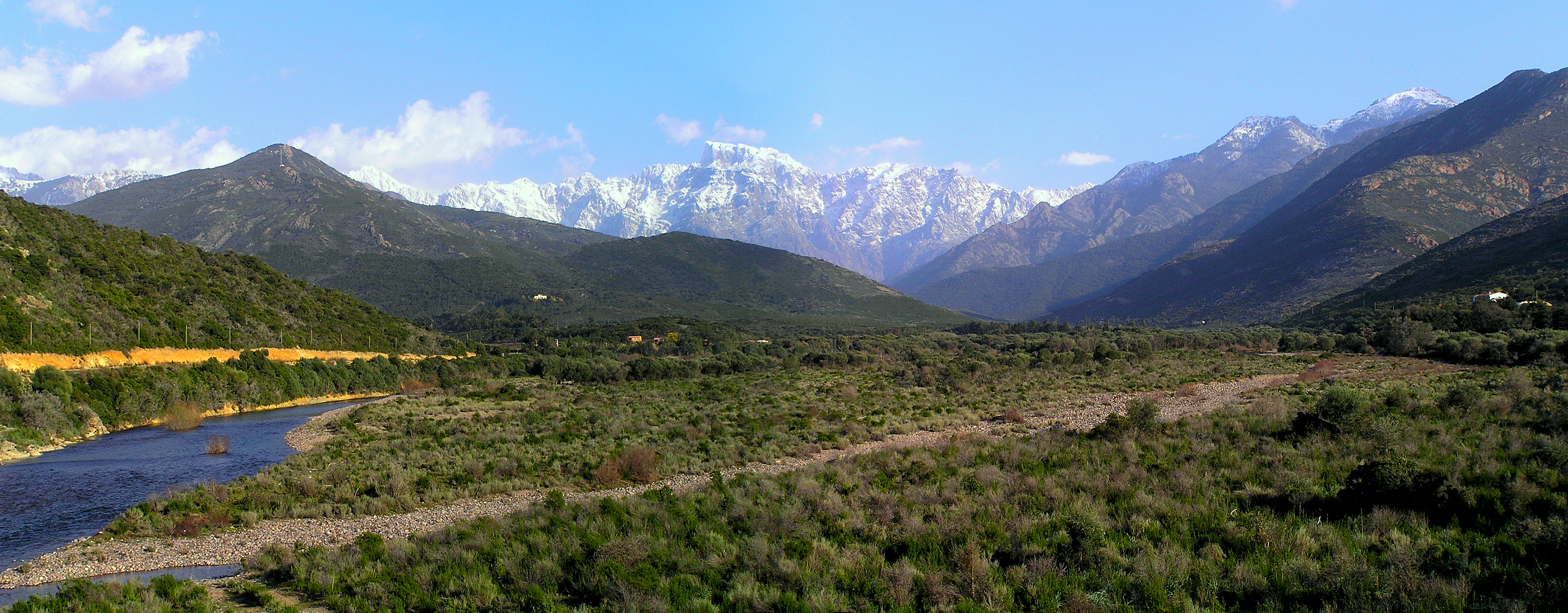
The Paglia Orba seen from the Pont des 5 Arcades (D81) in Galéria, above the Fango valley.

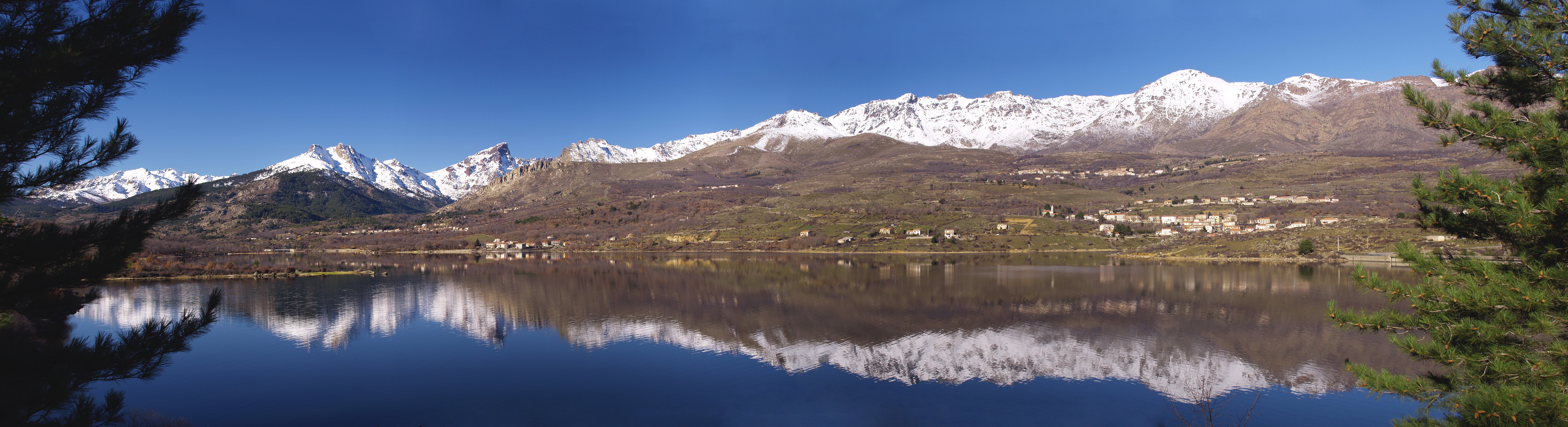
La Paglia Orba (left) seen from the Lac de Calacuccia. In the middle, Monte Cintu.

== Sources ==
- Bouchra Zarki‐Jakni; Peter van der Beek; Gérard Poupeau; Marc Sosson; Erika Labrin; Philippe Rossi; Jean Ferrandini (February 2004), "Cenozoic denudation of Corsica in response to Ligurian and Tyrrhenian extension: Results from apatite fission track thermochronology", Tectonics, 23 (1), doi:10.1029/2003TC001535, ISSN 0278-7407, S2CID 129821727
- BRGM (1996), "Notice de la carte géologique de la France à 1/50000 feuille Galeria-Osani" (PDF), Infoterre*Chiorboli, Jean (27 March 2020), "Paglia Orba : sommets corses emblématiques", Corse-Matin « Settimana (in French), ISSN 2429-4764
- "Climber killed", Belfast Telegraph: 7, 25 July 1961, ISSN 0307-5664
- Fabrikant, Michel (1982), Guide des montagnes corses : Randonnées pédestres et escalades, Cartes et guides de Corse (in French), Grenoble: Didier Richard, p. 408, ISBN 978-2-7038-0018-7
- Gauthier, Alain (2015), Corse, l'Élysée du Géologue, Albiana, p. 232, ISBN 978-2-8241-0632-8
