= Figarella =

River in the department of Haute-Corse, Corsica

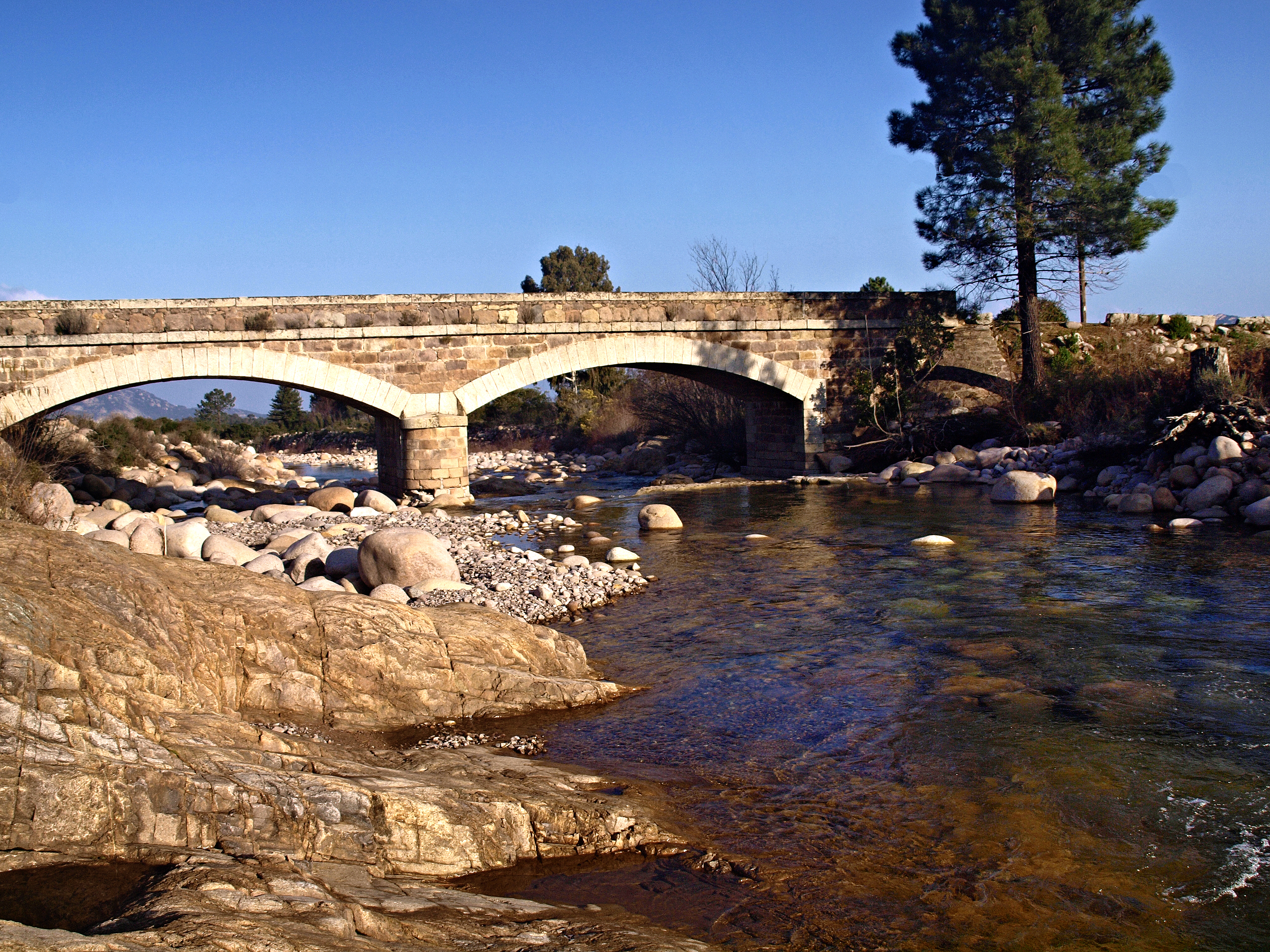
- RD 51 bridge over the Figarella at Moncale

- Location within Corsica Location within France

Location
- Country: France
- Region: Corsica
- Department: Haute-Corse

Physical characteristics
- Mouth: Mediterranean Sea
  - coordinates: 42.5581°N 8.7872°E

The Figarella is a small coastal river in the northwest of the department of Haute-Corse, Corsica, France.

== Course ==
The Figarella is 24.16 kilometres (15.01 mi) long. It crosses the communes of Calenzana, Calvi and Moncale. The river rises as the Ruisseau de Spasimata in the commune of Calenzana to the northeast of the 2,085 metres (6,841 ft) Punta Mazagnu in the Monte Cinto Massif and flows northwest. The Figarella proper forms when the Spasimata is joined by the Rau de Melaghia from the north. It turns to the north and flows between the villages of Suare and Tarazone, then along the east side of the Calvi – Sainte-Catherine Airport. It is joined by the Ronca river from the left just north of the airport, then by the Campu Longu stream from the right before entering the sea just west of Camp Raffalli.

== Human impacts ==
In the late 19th century the decline in agriculture led to croplands and pasture being replaced by wild undergrowth and woods, which reduced the amount of erosion and run-off. This in turn led to less sediment being carried to the mouth of the river. In the 1970s in-channel gravel mining began in the river, and about 600,000 cubic metres (21,000,000 cu ft) of gravel were removed. The gravel pit traps sediment, and has caused braided channels to be replaced by a single channel. Most of the former channels are now vegetated. Downstream, the result has been erosion of the beach, which started in the 19th century and is likely to continue for several decades, destroying a tourist attraction.

== Hydrology ==
The Figarella was measured at Calenzana between 1960 and 1976. At this point it captures a watershed of 33.8 square kilometres (13.1 sq mi). The maximum instantaneous flow rate was 43.5 cubic metres per second (1,540 cu ft/s) on 24 September 1974.

== Tributaries ==
The following streams (ruisseaux) are tributaries of the Figarella (ordered by length) and sub-tributaries:

- Campu Longu 10 km (6.2 mi)
  - Novalella 2 km (1.2 mi)
- Ronca (river) 9 km (5.6 mi)
  - Enferata 7 km (4.3 mi)
    - Campu d'Ava 3 km (1.9 mi)
    - Vespaiu 2 km (1.2 mi)
      - Capu Pianu 2 km (1.2 mi)
    - Signoria 2 km (1.2 mi)
- Lioli 8 km (5.0 mi)
  - Acqua Viva 3 km (1.9 mi)
  - Campanella 3 km (1.9 mi)
  - Falcunaghia 2 km (1.2 mi)
- Melaghia 5 km (3.1 mi)
  - Mandriaccia 3 km (1.9 mi)
- Onda 5 km (3.1 mi)
- Curzulosu 4 km (2.5 mi)
  - Sambucu 3 km (1.9 mi)
    - Arghioa 3 km (1.9 mi)
    - Catarelle 1 km (0.62 mi)
  - Vivariu 2 km (1.2 mi)
- Frassigna 3 km (1.9 mi)
  - Vespaghiu 2 km (1.2 mi)
  - Melaghiola 2 km (1.2 mi)
- Nocaghia 3 km (1.9 mi)
  - Terribule 2 km (1.2 mi)
- Pelliciani 3 km (1.9 mi)
  - Vignali 2 km (1.2 mi)
- Meta di Filu 3 km (1.9 mi)
  - Pittinaghia 1 km (0.62 mi)
- Purcareccia 2 km (1.2 mi)
- Ladroncellu 2 km (1.2 mi)
- Valle d'Alloru 2 km (1.2 mi)

== Sources ==
- Gaillot, S.; Piégay, H. (Summer 1999), "Impact of Gravel-Mining on Stream Channel and Coastal Sediment Supply: Example of the Calvi Bay in Corsica (France)", Journal of Coastal Research, 15 (3), Coastal Education & Research Foundation, Inc.: 774–788
- "La Figarella à Calenzana", eaufrance (in French), Ministère de l'Ecologie, du Développement Durable et de l'Energie
- "La Figarella", Sandre (in French)
- "Relation: La Figarella (8479277)", OpenStreetMap
