= Monte Cinto Massif =

Massif in Corsica, France

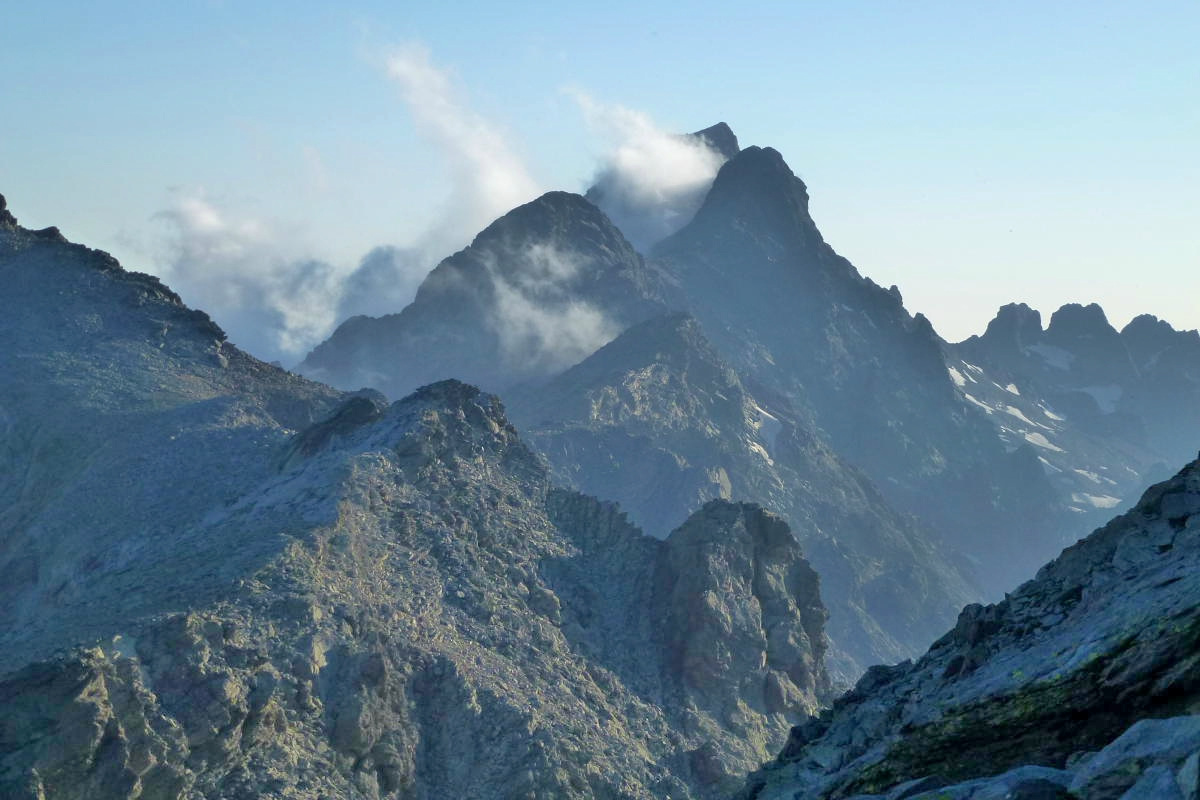
- Monte Cinto from Capu Biancu (2,562 m)

Highest point
- Elevation: 2,706 m (8,878 ft)
- Prominence: 2,706 m (8,878 ft)
- Coordinates: 42°22′46.86″N 8°56′44.22″E

Geography
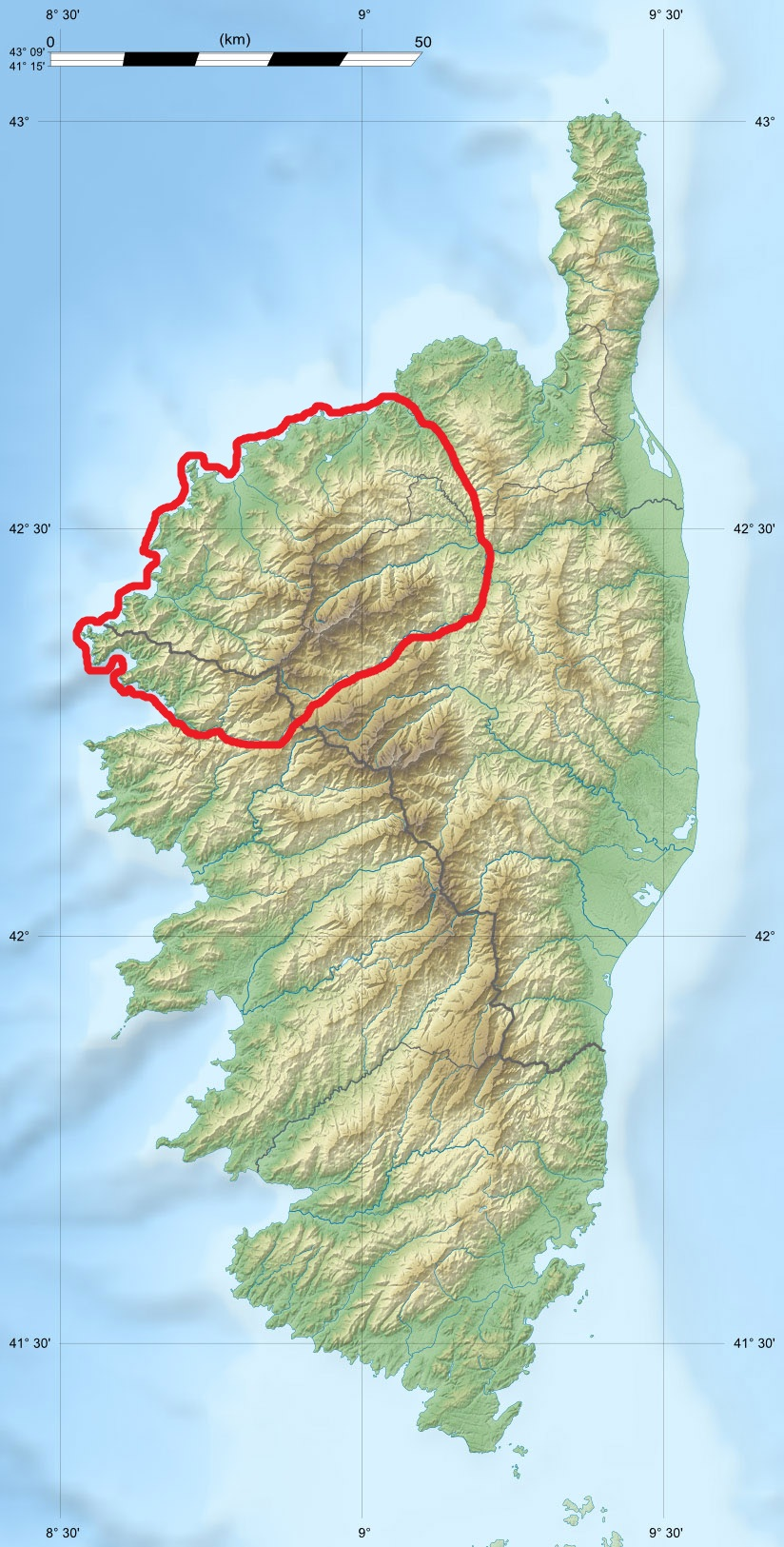
- Location: Corsica, France

The Monte Cinto Massif is one of the main massifs in the island of Corsica, France, taking its name from the highest mountain in Corsica, Monte Cinto. It is the northernmost and highest of the four massifs that form the spine of the island. The massif is mostly in the Haute-Corse department, but the southwest of the massif is in the Corse-du-Sud department.

== Setting ==
The island of Corsica essentially consists of a long chain of mountains divided into four massifs. From north to south these are the massifs of Monte Cinto, Monte Rotondo, Monte Renoso and Monte Incudine. The Monte Cinto Massif is the highest at 2,706 metres (8,878 ft) of elevation, followed by the massifs of Monte Rotondo, Monte Renoso and Monte Incudine. The main peaks are Monte Cinto, Punta Minuta, Paglia Orba, Monte Padro, Monte Traunato, Monte Corona, Capu a u Ceppu and Monte Grosso.

The massif is bounded by the Forêt de Bonifatu and Forêt de Tartagine Melaja to the north, the Forêt de Pineto to the east and the Forêt de Valdu Niellu to the south. It is drained by the Fango river to the west, the Tavignano to the southeast, the Golo to the east, the Asco and Tartagine to the northeast and the Figarella to the northwest.

== Peaks ==
The main peaks are,

| Name | Elevation | | Prominence | |
| Name | meters | feet | meters | feet |
|---|---|---|---|---|
| Monte Cinto | 2,706 | 8,878 | 2,706 | 8,878 |
| Capo al Berdato | 2,583 | 8,474 | 163 | 535 |
| Capu Biancu | 2,562 | 8,406 | 140 | 460 |
| Punta Minuta | 2,556 | 8,386 | 176 | 577 |
| Capu Falu | 2,540 | 8,330 | 115 | 377 |
| Paglia Orba | 2,525 | 8,284 | 530 | 1,740 |
| Capu Larghia | 2,503 | 8,212 | 98 | 322 |
| Monte Padro | 2,389 | 7,838 | 545 | 1,788 |
| Capu Tafunatu | 2,335 | 7,661 | 192 | 630 |
| Cima di a Statoghia | 2,305 | 7,562 | 279 | 915 |
| Punta Rossa | 2,247 | 7,372 | 117 | 384 |
| Punta Licciola | 2,235 | 7,333 | 268 | 879 |
| Punta Missoghiu | 2,201 | 7,221 | 215 | 705 |
| Cima a i Mori | 2,180 | 7,150 | 350 | 1,150 |
| a Muvrella | 2,148 | 7,047 | 195 | 640 |
| Capu Ladroncellu | 2,145 | 7,037 | 206 | 676 |
| Monte Corona | 2,144 | 7,034 | 860 | 2,820 |
| Capu a e Ghiarghiole | 2,105 | 6,906 | 94 | 308 |
| Capu a u Dente | 2,029 | 6,657 | 178 | 584 |
| Punta di e Cricche | 2,057 | 6,749 | 222 | 728 |
| Monte Albanu | 2,018 | 6,621 | 112 | 367 |
| Capu a u Ceppu | 1,951 | 6,401 | 363 | 1,191 |
| Monte Grosso | 1,935 | 6,348 | 161 | 528 |
| San Parteo | 1,680 | 5,510 | | |
| Capu a a Ghiallichiccia | 1,619 | 5,312 | 395 | 1,296 |

== Gallery ==
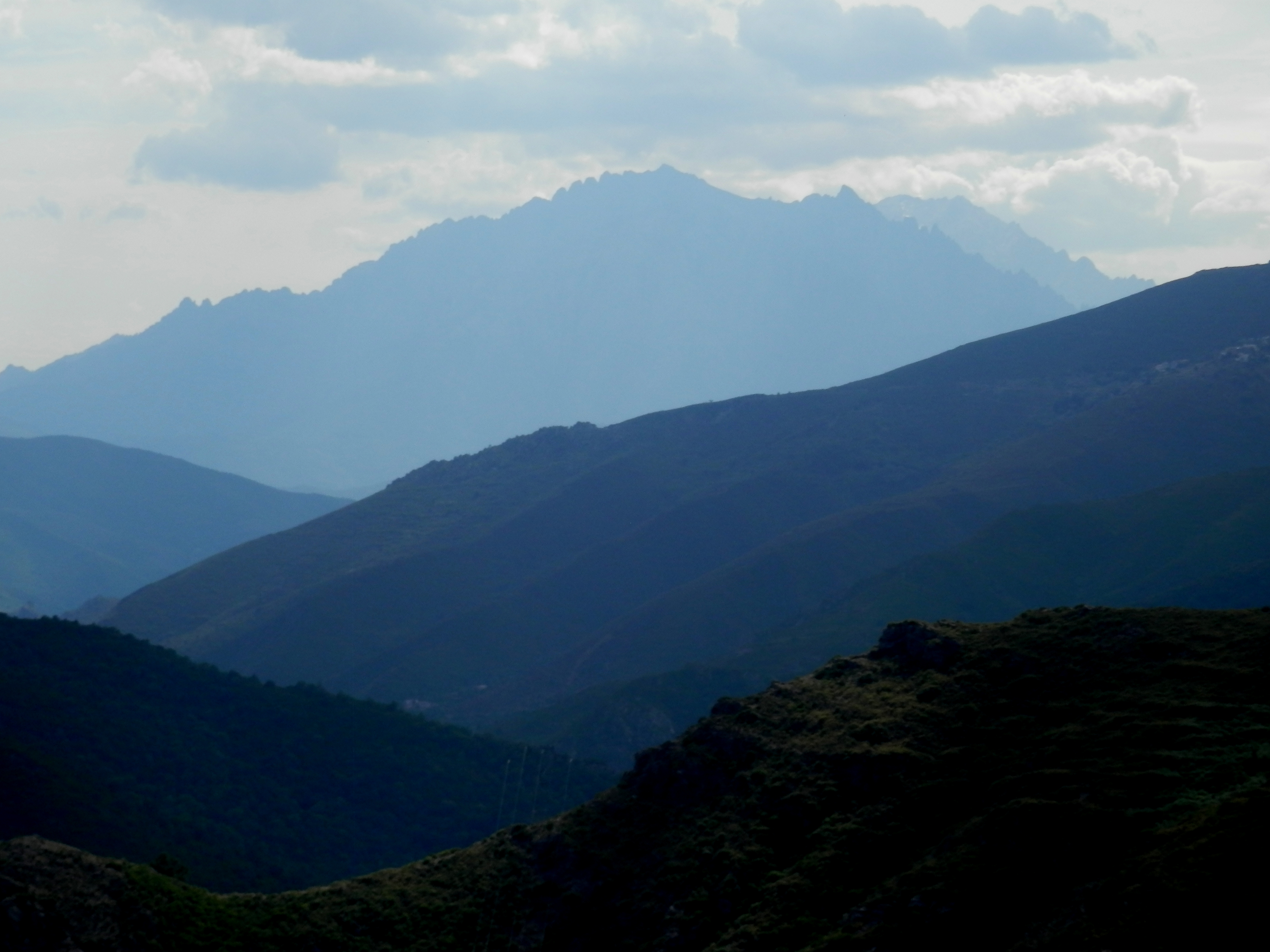
Penna Rossa and Capu Biancu from Custera

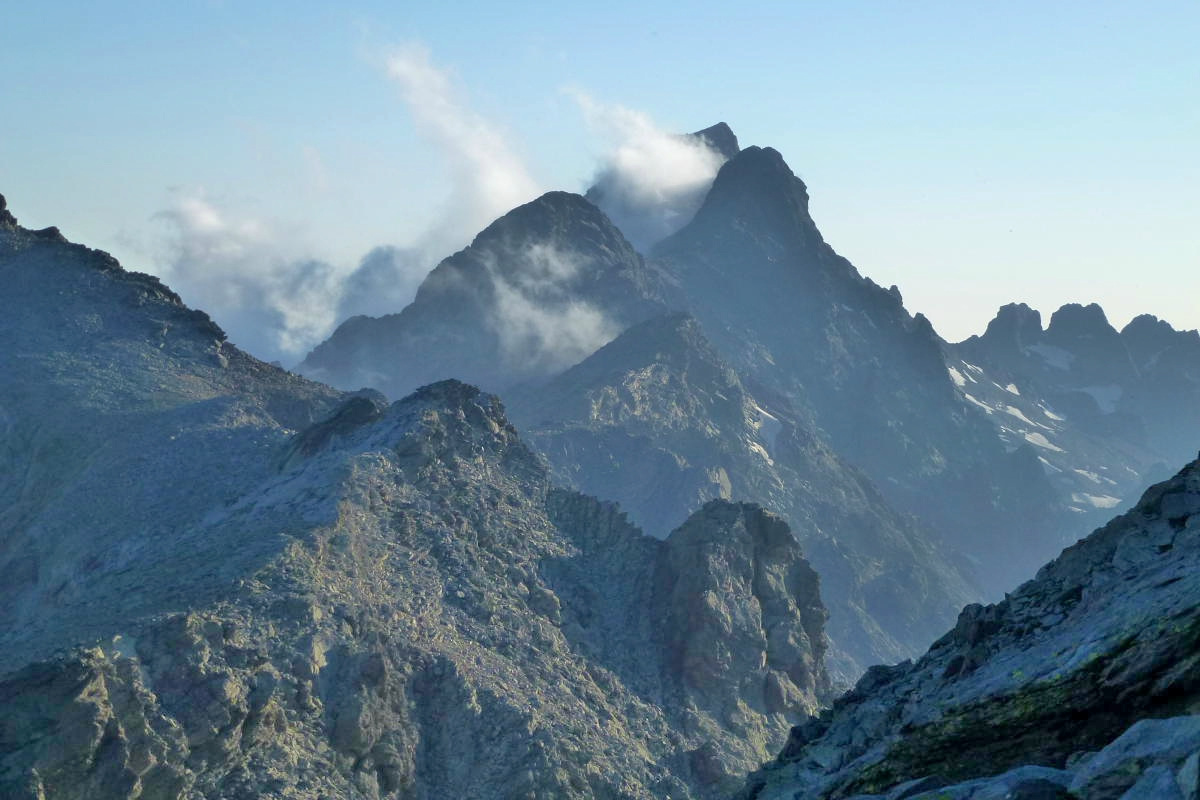
Monte Cinto from Capu Biancu

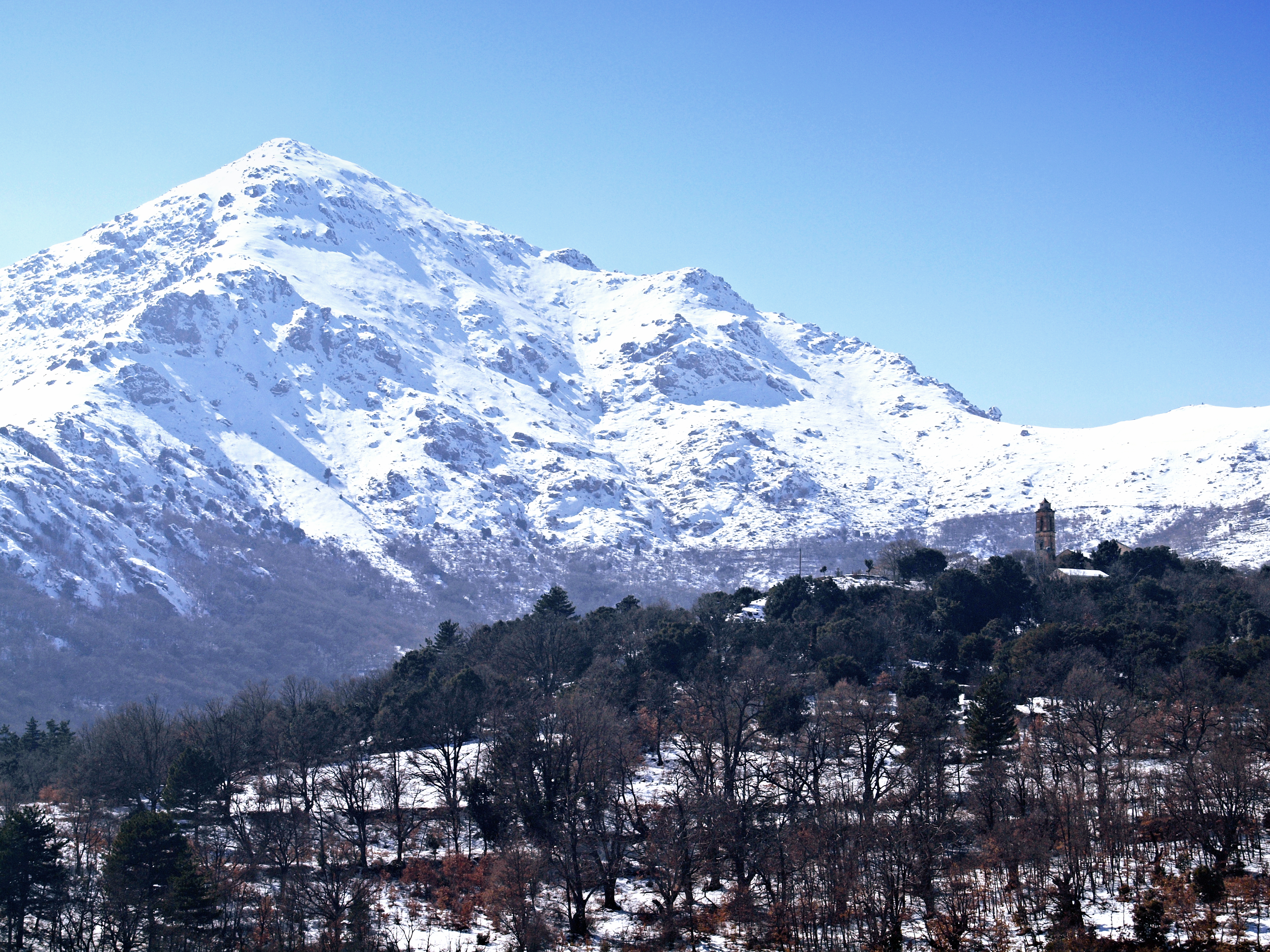
Pioggiola view of San Parteo

== See also ==
- List of mountains in Corsica by height

== Sources ==
- "Europe Ultra-Prominences", Peaklist.org
- "Le Monte Cinto", GR20 Infos (in French)
- "Node: Monte Cinto (1102925427)", OpenStreetMap
- "Randonnée Monte Cinto (2706 m) GR20 Corse", Les Topos Pyrénées (in French)
