= Galéria =

- Commune
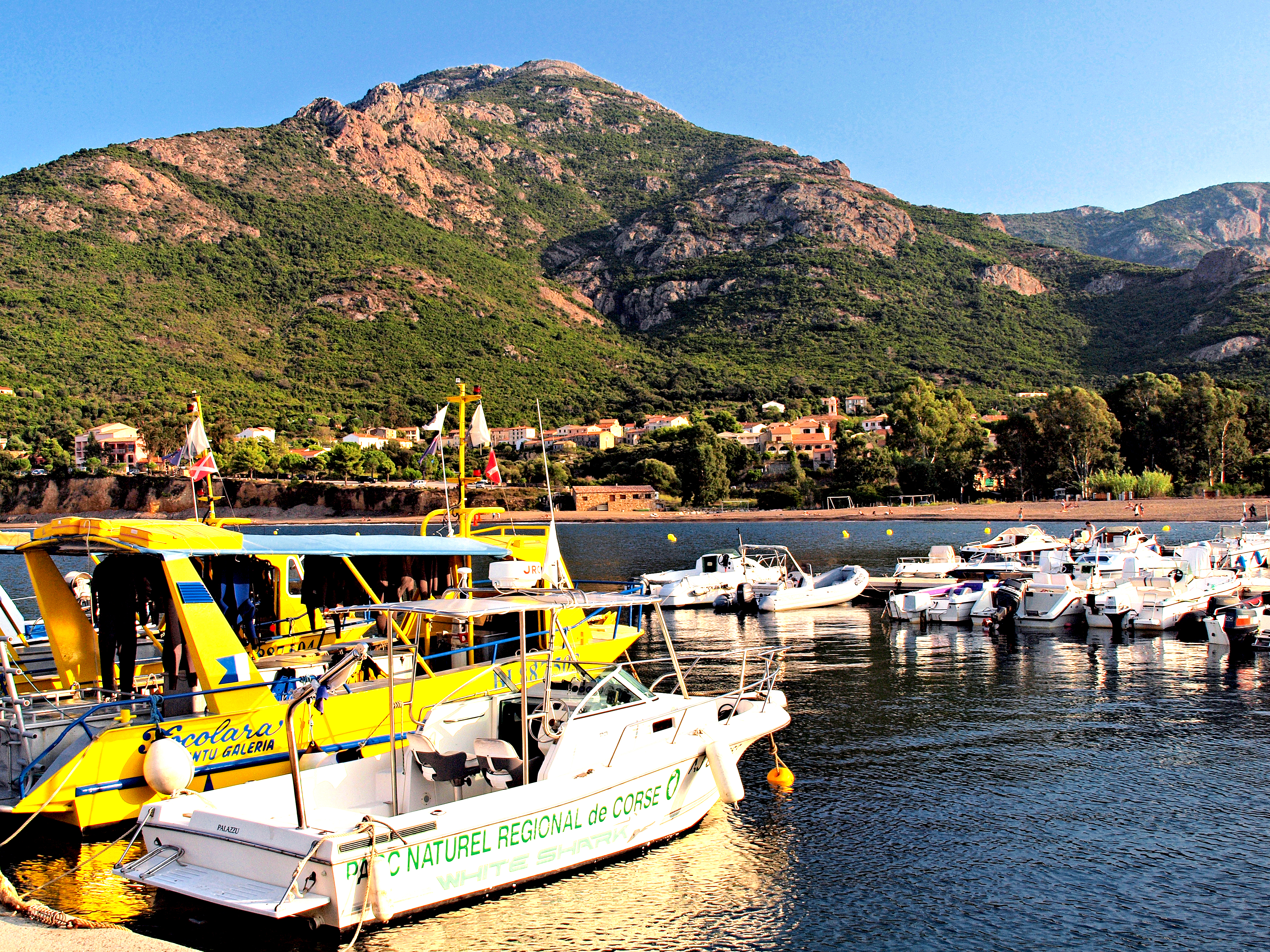
- The harbour in Galéria
- Location of Galéria
- Location within France Location within Corsica
- Coordinates: 42°24′36″N 8°38′57″E
- Country: France
- Region: Corsica
- Department: Haute-Corse
- Arrondissement: Calvi
- Canton: Calvi
- Intercommunality: Calvi Balagne

Government
  - Mayor (2020–2026): Jean-Marie Seïte
- Area^{1}: 135.16 km^{2} (52.19 sq mi)
- Elevation: 29 m (95 ft)
- Highest elevation: 1,717 m (5,633 ft)
- Lowest elevation: 0 m (0 ft)
- Population (2023): 395
  - Density: 2.92/km^{2} (7.57/sq mi)
- Time zone: UTC+01:00 (CET)
  - Summer (DST): UTC+02:00 (CEST)
- INSEE/Postal code: 2B121 /20245
- ^{1} French Land Register data, which excludes lakes, ponds, glaciers > 1 km^{2} (0.386 sq mi or 247 acres) and river estuaries.

Galéria (French pronunciation: [ɡaleʁja]) is a commune in the Haute-Corse department of France on the island of Corsica.

== Geography ==
=== Climate ===
Galéria has a hot-summer mediterranean climate (Köppen climate classification Csa). The average annual temperature in Galéria is 15.8 °C (60.4 °F). The average annual rainfall is 741.0 mm (29.17 in) with December as the wettest month. The temperatures are highest on average in July, at around 24.2 °C (75.6 °F), and lowest in January, at around 9.0 °C (48.2 °F). The highest temperature ever recorded in Galéria was 42.0 °C (107.6 °F) on 5 July 1993; the coldest temperature ever recorded was −4.5 °C (23.9 °F) on 2 March 2005.

Climate data for Galéria (1981–2010 averages, extremes 1977−2014)
Month	Jan	Feb	Mar	Apr	May	Jun	Jul	Aug	Sep	Oct	Nov	Dec	Year
Record high °C (°F)	22.0 (71.6)	24.0 (75.2)	32.0 (89.6)	30.0 (86.0)	34.5 (94.1)	36.5 (97.7)	42.0 (107.6)	41.0 (105.8)	37.5 (99.5)	31.1 (88.0)	29.5 (85.1)	25.0 (77.0)	42.0 (107.6)
Mean daily maximum °C (°F)	13.8 (56.8)	14.1 (57.4)	16.1 (61.0)	18.7 (65.7)	23.0 (73.4)	26.9 (80.4)	30.7 (87.3)	30.4 (86.7)	26.5 (79.7)	22.6 (72.7)	17.8 (64.0)	14.7 (58.5)	21.3 (70.3)
Daily mean °C (°F)	9.0 (48.2)	9.1 (48.4)	10.9 (51.6)	13.1 (55.6)	17.2 (63.0)	20.9 (69.6)	24.2 (75.6)	24.1 (75.4)	20.5 (68.9)	17.2 (63.0)	13.0 (55.4)	10.0 (50.0)	15.8 (60.4)
Mean daily minimum °C (°F)	4.2 (39.6)	4.1 (39.4)	5.8 (42.4)	7.5 (45.5)	11.5 (52.7)	15.0 (59.0)	17.7 (63.9)	17.7 (63.9)	14.5 (58.1)	11.8 (53.2)	8.3 (46.9)	5.3 (41.5)	10.3 (50.5)
Record low °C (°F)	−4.0 (24.8)	−4.5 (23.9)	−4.5 (23.9)	1.0 (33.8)	4.5 (40.1)	5.0 (41.0)	8.0 (46.4)	9.0 (48.2)	6.0 (42.8)	2.5 (36.5)	−0.5 (31.1)	−4.0 (24.8)	−4.5 (23.9)
Average precipitation mm (inches)	67.1 (2.64)	52.8 (2.08)	58.6 (2.31)	73.5 (2.89)	45.5 (1.79)	33.5 (1.32)	7.5 (0.30)	22.9 (0.90)	69.2 (2.72)	102.7 (4.04)	124.2 (4.89)	83.5 (3.29)	741.0 (29.17)
Average precipitation days (≥ 1.0 mm)	6.5	6.2	6.2	7.3	5.2	2.8	1.1	2.1	5.2	8.1	9.1	8.4	68.2
Source: Meteociel

== Population ==
Historical population
Year	Pop.	±% p.a.
1968	350	—
1975	311	−1.67%
1982	306	−0.23%
1990	305	−0.04%
1999	302	−0.11%
2007	340	+1.49%
2012	327	−0.78%
2017	338	+0.66%
2023	395	+2.63%
Source: INSEE

== See also ==
- Torra di Galeria
- Communes of the Haute-Corse department
