= Manso, Haute-Corse =

Manso
- Commune
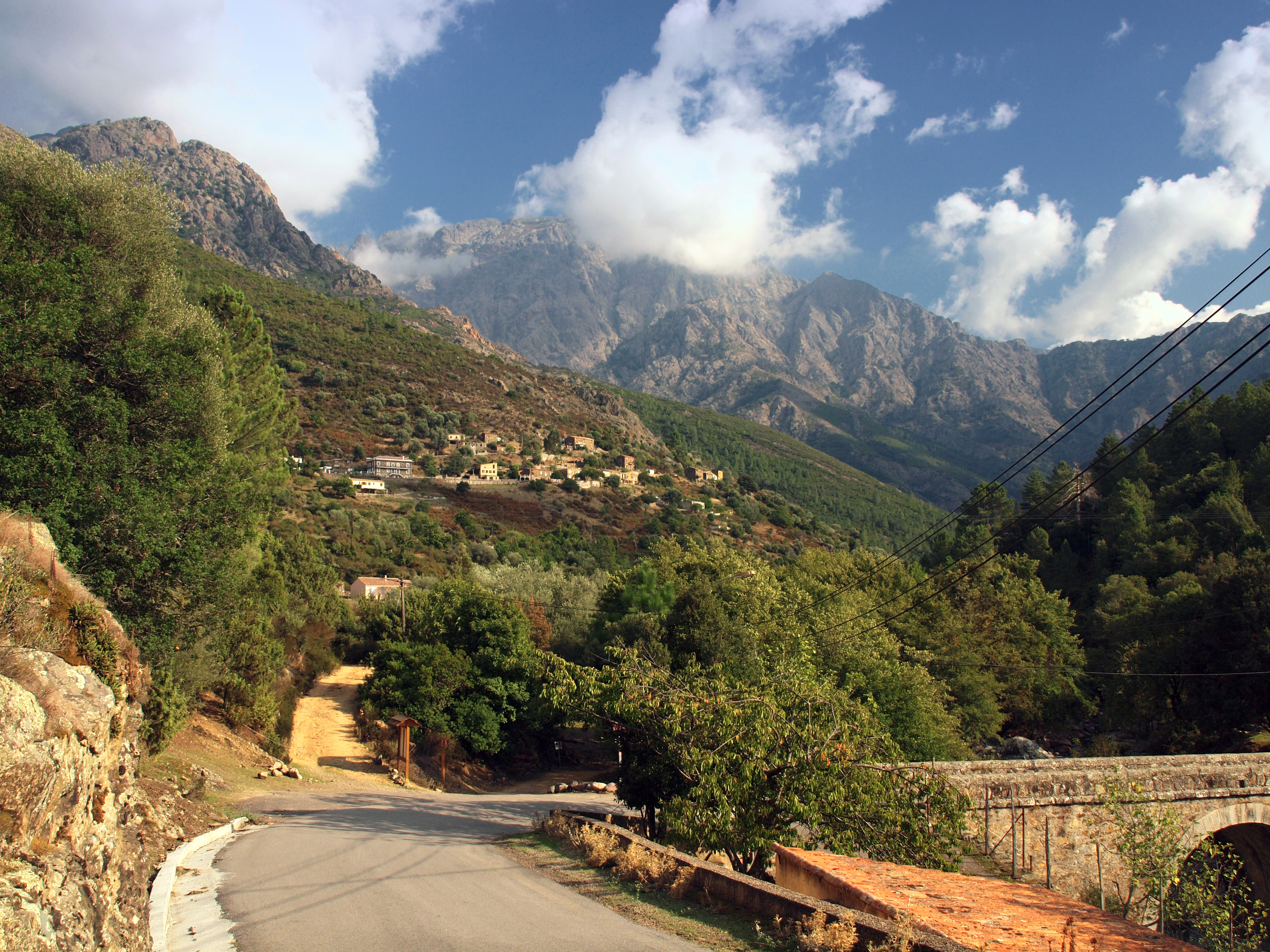
- Montestremu, part of Manso
- Location of Manso
- Location within France Location within Corsica
- Coordinates: 42°22′00″N 8°47′35″E
- Country: France
- Region: Corsica
- Department: Haute-Corse
- Arrondissement: Calvi
- Canton: Calvi
- Intercommunality: Calvi Balagne

Government
  - Mayor (2020–2026): Pasquale Simeoni
- Area^{1}: 121.02 km^{2} (46.73 sq mi)
- Elevation: 120 m (390 ft)
- Highest elevation: 2,558 m (8,392 ft)
- Lowest elevation: 40 m (130 ft)
- Population (2023): 116
  - Density: 0.959/km^{2} (2.48/sq mi)
- Time zone: UTC+01:00 (CET)
  - Summer (DST): UTC+02:00 (CEST)
- INSEE/Postal code: 2B153 /20245
- ^{1} French Land Register data, which excludes lakes, ponds, glaciers > 1 km^{2} (0.386 sq mi or 247 acres) and river estuaries.

Manso (French pronunciation: [mɑ̃so]) is a commune in the Haute-Corse department of France on the island of Corsica.

== Population ==
Historical population
Year	Pop.	±% p.a.
1968	79	—
1975	125	+6.77%
1982	175	+4.92%
1990	130	−3.65%
1999	106	−2.24%
2007	106	+0.00%
2012	107	+0.19%
2017	114	+1.28%
2023	116	+0.29%
Source: INSEE

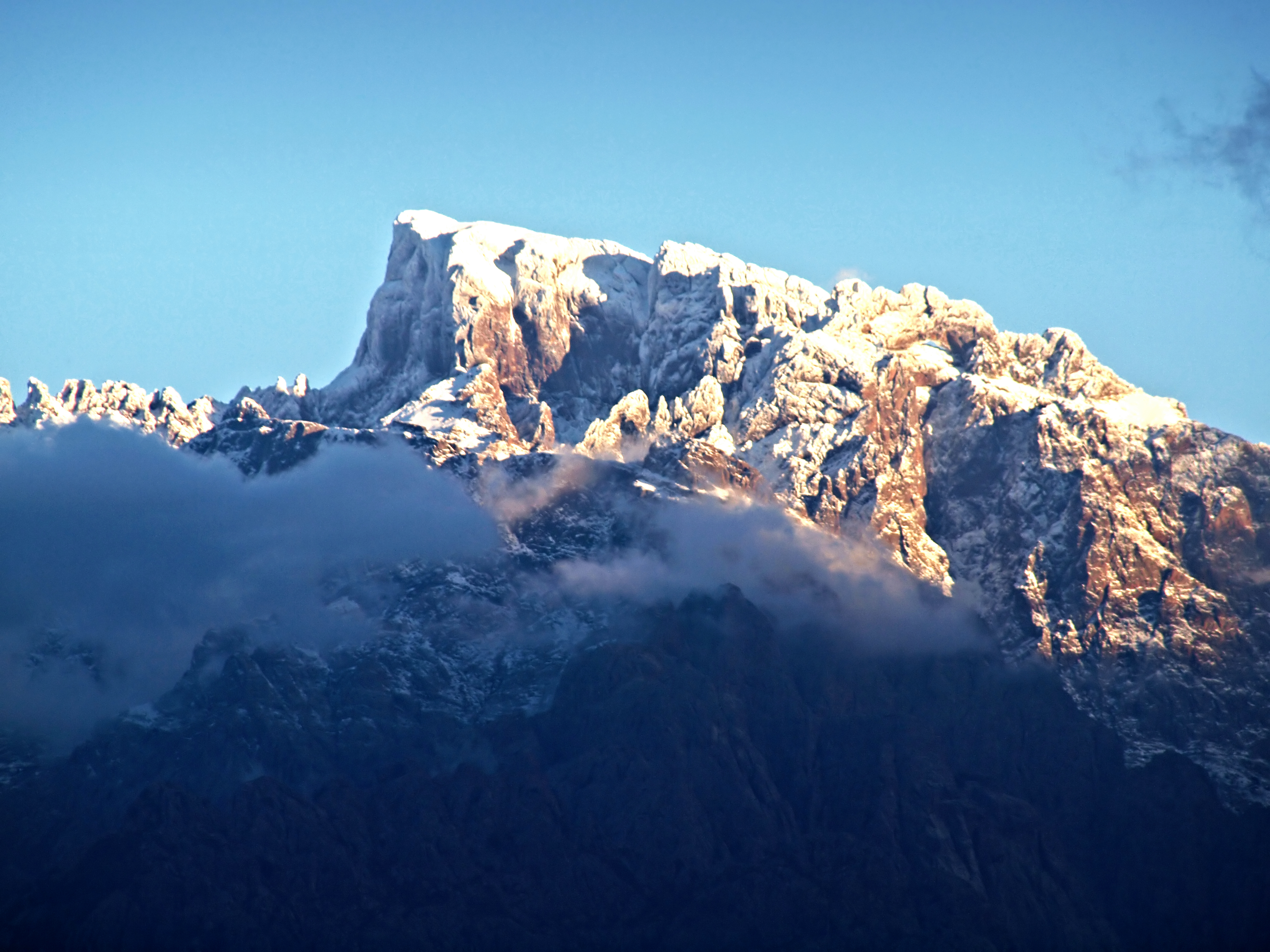
Paglia Orba

== See also ==
- Communes of the Haute-Corse department
