= Algajola =

- Commune
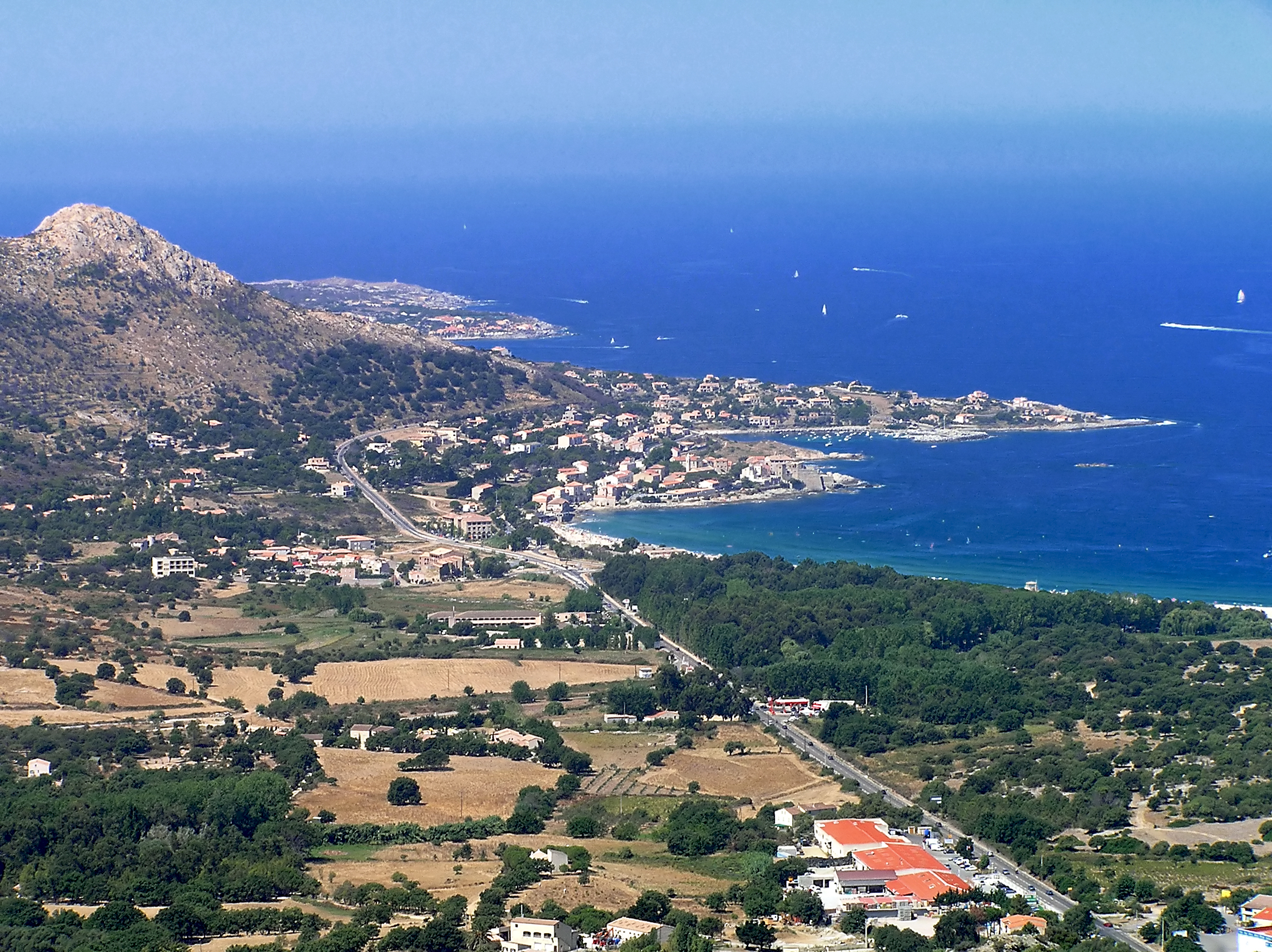
- A general view of Algajola, seen from Corbara
- Location of Algajola
- Location within France Location within Corsica
- Coordinates: 42°36′31″N 8°51′46″E
- Country: France
- Region: Corsica
- Department: Haute-Corse
- Arrondissement: Calvi
- Canton: Calvi
- Intercommunality: Calvi Balagne

Government
  - Mayor (2020–2026): François Rossi
- Area^{1}: 1.72 km^{2} (0.66 sq mi)
- Elevation: 14 m (46 ft)
- Highest elevation: 269 m (883 ft)
- Lowest elevation: 0 m (0 ft)
- Population (2023): 363
  - Density: 211/km^{2} (547/sq mi)
- Time zone: UTC+01:00 (CET)
  - Summer (DST): UTC+02:00 (CEST)
- INSEE/Postal code: 2B010 /20220
- ^{1} French Land Register data, which excludes lakes, ponds, glaciers > 1 km^{2} (0.386 sq mi or 247 acres) and river estuaries.

Algajola (Corsican: Algaghjola) is a commune in the Haute-Corse department of France on the island of Corsica.

== Geography ==
Algajola is a commune on the Balagne coast between Calvi, 12 km to the west, and Ile Rousse, 10 km to the East. It is one of 19 communes in the Canton of Belgodère and not to those of Calvi or Ile Rousse as its location would suggest. It is part of the arrondissement of Calvi.

=== Relief ===
The commune occupies a small area of 172 hectares on the coast bisected by small hills oriented north-south, the highest is a "saddle" straddling Algajola and Aregno which rises to 288m. To the west of the hills, Tebina is a flat area and Cocani covers the hillsides down to the resort. On both sides of the hills their slopes were once covered with maquis then were turned into terraces to cultivate strips of land. For a long time the maquis here consisted mainly of cistus and mastic, oaks and some wild olive trees which reestablished themselves on the abandoned terraces.

One small stream, unnamed on maps, rises in the commune at Tepina and empties into the port of San Damiano.

=== Boundaries ===
The borders of Algajola can be defined as follows:

- North: a mostly ragged coastline 3 km long along the shores of the Mediterranean with the Punta San Damiano. To the east of this part, away from the prevailing westerly winds, is the port of San Damiano, which was built in Roman times, and the village of Algajola with its fortress "feet in the water". This is part of a point located 500m west of Punta San Damiano ending 200 m from the sandy beach of Aregno in the east. This beach is covered with Posidonia or sea grass in winter which may perhaps be the origin of the name of the town (petite algue meaning "small algae") but this is probably a folk etymology

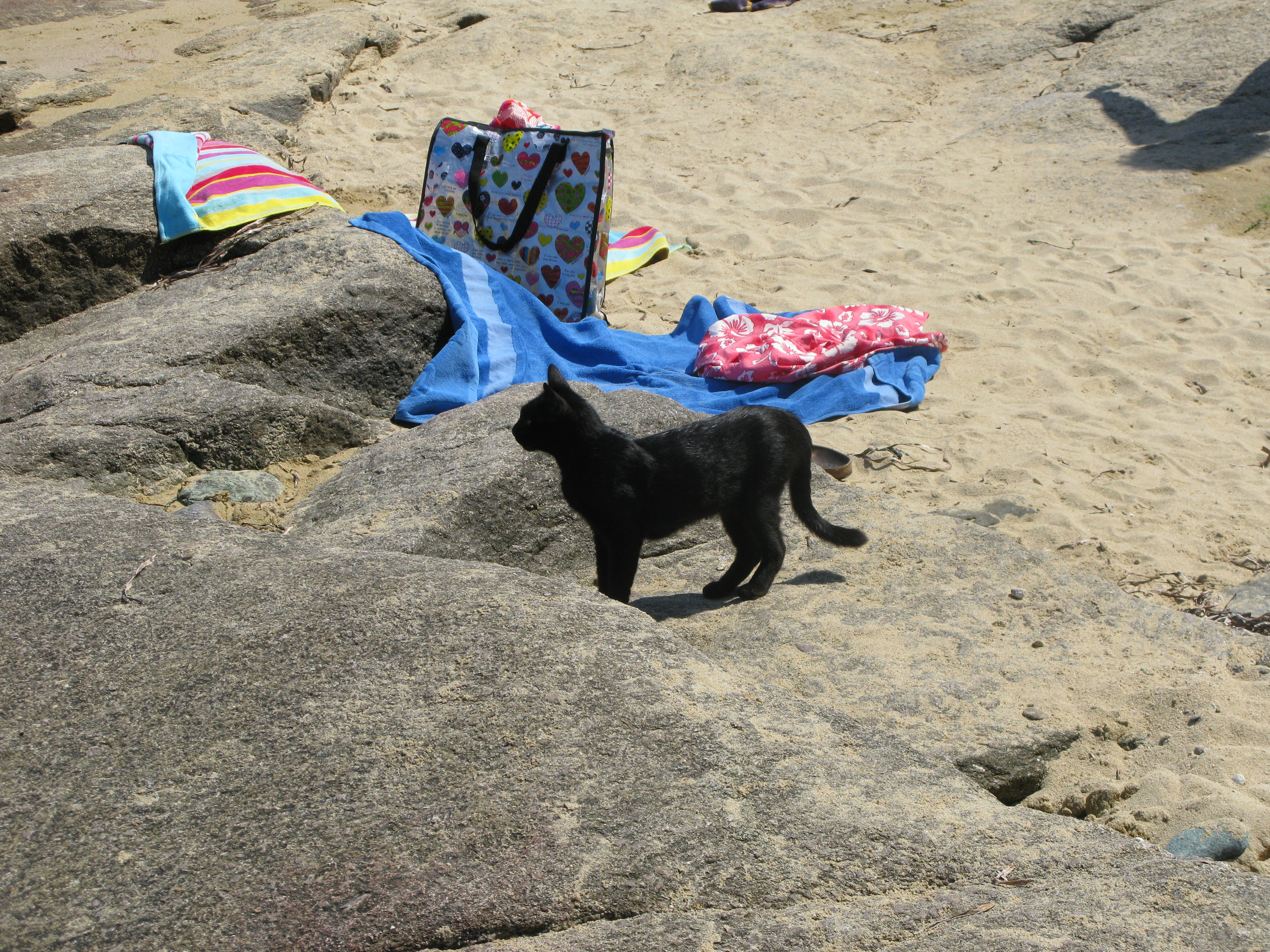
The beach.

- East: the border goes south from the start of the beach of Aregno and National Route N197 crosses the border just north of the Cala di Sole campsite then the border continues south to the hills of Monti (281 m) and the highest point in the commune (269 m)
- South: the boundary follows the ridge of the hills towards Capu Luna Piana (345 m-Lumio) without reaching it to a point located 251 m above sea level overlooking Algajola, Aregno, and Lumio. From there the border passes north-west to Ribe at a point approximately 400 m from the coast
- West: from Ribe the line runs north to the sea crossing the N197.

=== Habitat ===
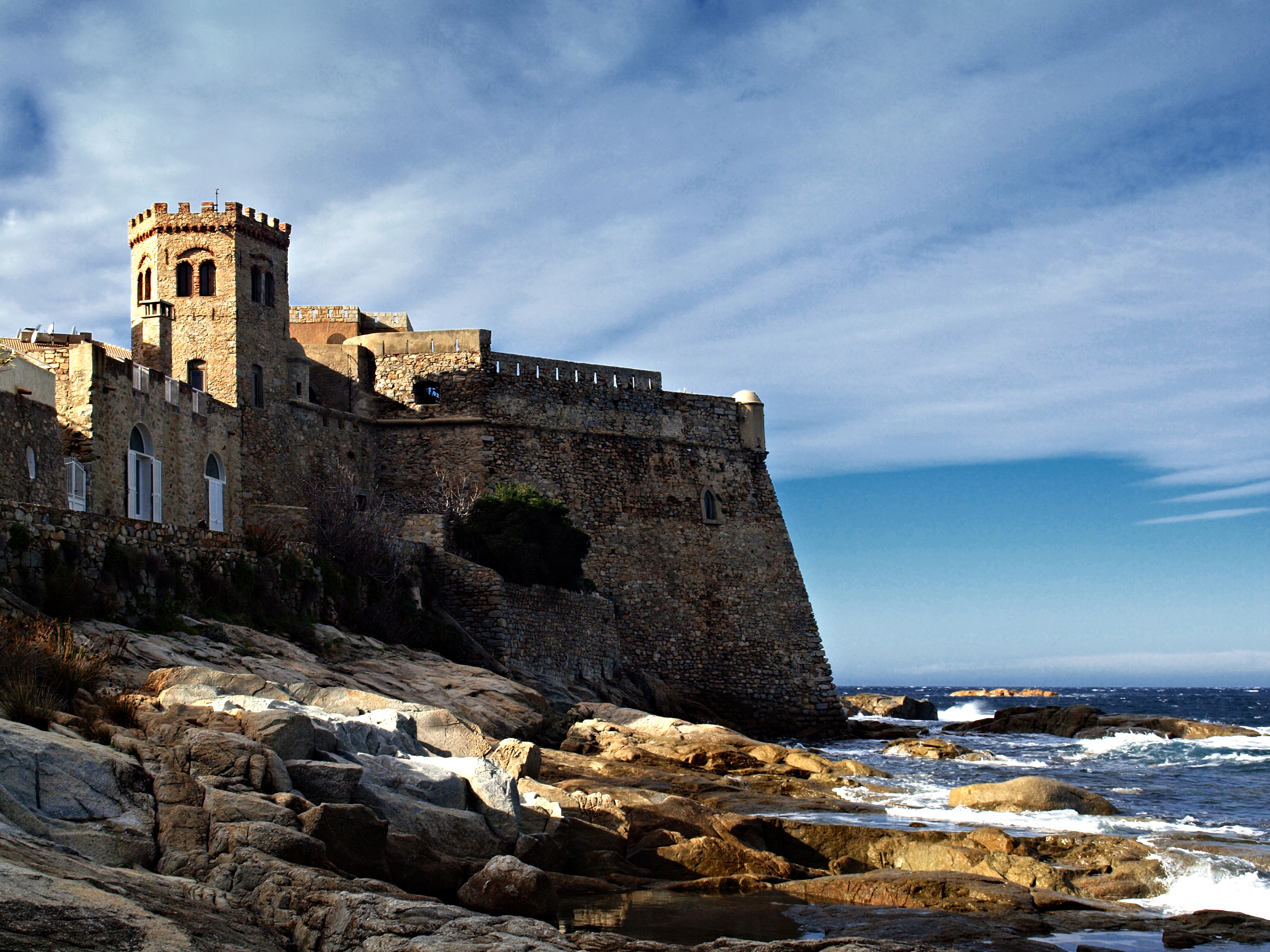
Algajola Fort

Algajola was a small fishing port with a fort on the sea built with the concurrence of the neighbouring towns. Professional fishermen have almost disappeared and activities have turned to tourism. In a few decades the population of Algajola almost tripled although its territory is small. In summer, there are thousands of residents, Italian tourists, northern Europeans, and French people who come to visit this resort town with its fortress by the sea.

The western part of the commune has the marina of San Damiano.

=== Access ===
==== Rail Access ====
The village is served by a CFC railway line. During the summer season, it is the Trinighellu stop on the beaches service from Calvi to L'Ile Rousse.

==== Road access ====
There is a single road accessing the commune: the National Route N197. A parallel road accessing Aregno beach to the east starts from the roundabout which was opened in 2010 to the west allows access to the village by the sea. At the roundabout a road also leads to the fishing port/marina of San Damiano.

== History ==
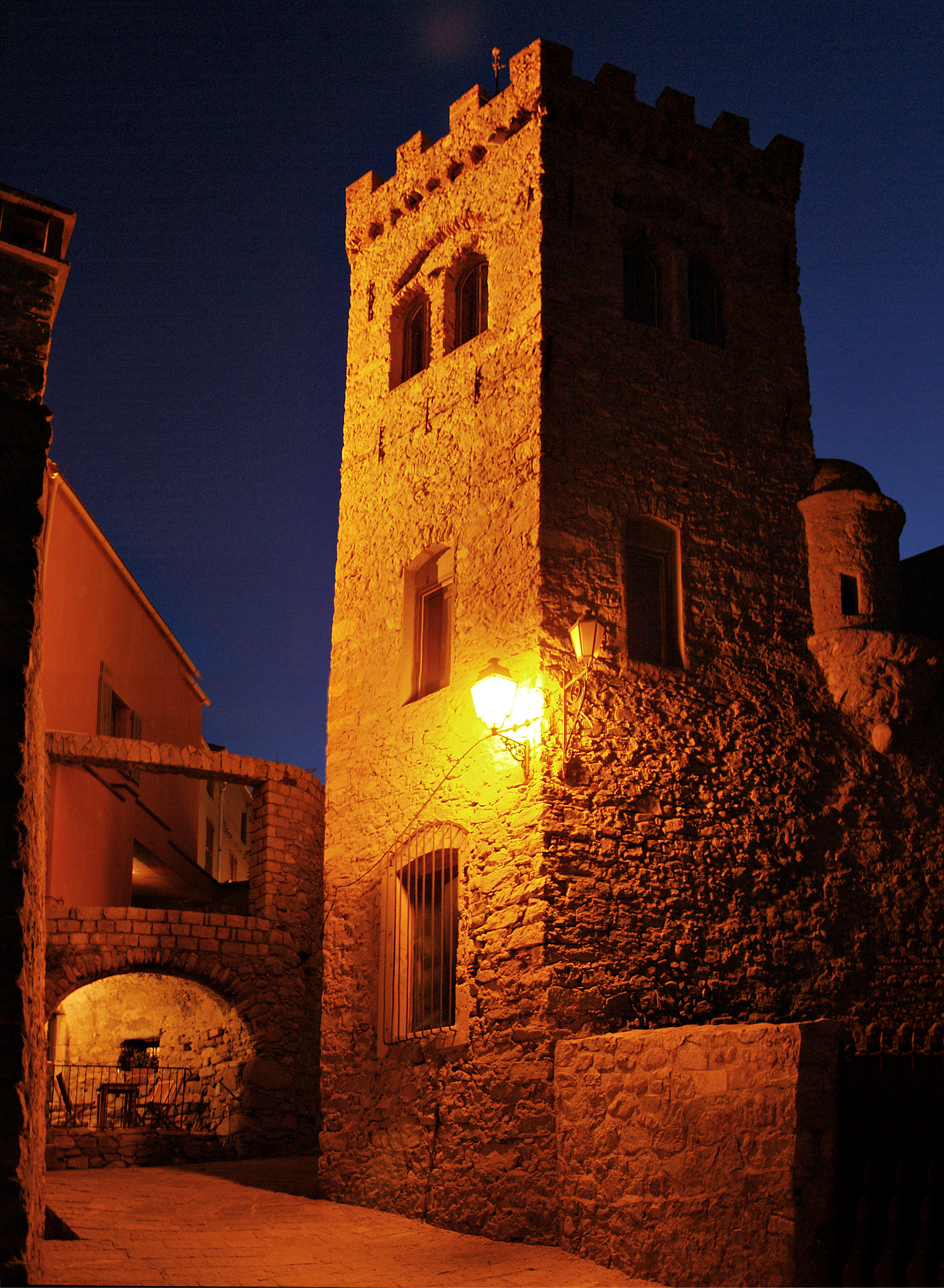
The Castellu

=== Antiquity ===
Algajola was built on the site of an ancient Phoenician city called Argha. An etymology from a commune at Alghero on a similar site in Sardinia is possible.

According to the historians Cluver and Canari, CÆSIÆ littus shown on the northern coast of Corsica by Ptolemy on his maps was Algajola. According to Müller it was the Gulf of Saint-Florent. Following his study, Xavier Poli excluded these hypotheses stating that: "Cæsiæ is clearly the beach on the Gulf of Calvi" because littus means "sandy beach". The Aregno beach that starts in the commune is equally sandy.

=== Middle Ages ===
Algajola, according to Gabbiola (or Gabiola), was in the old Pieve of Aregnu.

=== Modern times ===
From the 16th century to 1520 Balagne was a province of the Republic of Genoa. It was composed of the pieves of Tuani, Aregnu, Santo Andrea, Pino, and Olmia. The Pieve of Aregno had several populated places: Arpagiola (or Gabiola), Corbaia, Monticello, Santo Antonino, Santa Riparata, Piaza, Pragola, Le Torre, Regno, li Catari lo Lavatogio, Lacona, Spano, Hogio, and Aquapessa with a total of approximately 1,350 inhabitants.

Algaiola was the administrative capital of the province of Balagne. A court for the nearby pièves was established there. A castle fortress was built shortly before 1531 for the use of the "lieutenant" (luogotenente: he was the representative of the executive power at the head of a province) of the Office of Saint George and part the Genovese defensive system.

Before the war that gave Henry II of France to the Genovese in Corsica, Algajola was a very minor fortress on the coast:

"The village, now almost abandoned, was also very small since it had little more than twenty-five or thirty fires. Today there are even less. Even so it is very conveniently located as anyone going to the Piève of Balagne at Algajola for business can come back at night to sleep in his house. It is without doubt that because of this convenience that the Office of Saint George chose this place to be the residence of the lieutenant in preference to many other more populated and perhaps healthier areas. There is a Franciscan monastery in this piève, a vast and remarkable site with its cool shadows, the goodness of water and the air, so good that at Rome or Genoa such a site would pay many thousands of écus".

- Monseigneur Giustiniani in Dialogo nominato Corsica, translation by Father Letteron in History of Corsica, Volume I, page 19 (in French).

=== Algajola during the French war against Genoa ===
In January 1555 Manomozzo, the Sergeant Sampiero was sent by Marshal de Thermes from Ajaccio with a hundred men - many Corsicans and some Gascons - to take Saint-Florent. Repelled by the Genovese, they retreated to Balagne and decided to take Algaiola - a small castle near the sea where a group of twenty-five Genovese soldiers were stationed. Using ladders forty men descended on the place.

"The Genoese were stationed in a tower overlooking the house: they killed some with stones and Arquebuses while others surrendered and were made prisoners. Only four or five were able to escape back up the ropes on which they had scaled down. There remained thirty-five men either dead or prisoners. The Gascons lost only their weapons and were released but the eight Corsican prisoners were taken to Calvi and hanged after suffering various tortures. This event took place during the month of January 1555. " - Marc' Antonio Ceccaldi in Chronicle, translated by Father Letteron in History of Corsica - Volume II, page 169 (in French).

Shortly afterwards a French captain was sent from Ajaccio by Thermes with a galley and a cannon accompanied by plenty of ammunition to support Manomozzo's troops.

"The Captain in his galley fired a few shots of the castle, while Manomozzo fired on the ground with the cannon which had been landed there. (Note: a preceding Galiot had foundered on rocks near the entrance of the port of the île d'Or in a storm.) Finding themselves surrounded, those in the castle were forced to surrender." - Father Letteron in History of Corsica Volume II page 170 (in French).

Thermes was carrying a large quantity of food to Algaiola with fifteen galleys he had brought from Marseille. Two hundred Gascons in two companies were sent by Giordano Orsino to guard the large supplies of food that were being sent.

Sampiero being absent from the island, people everywhere took up arms in favour of Genoa. Frightened, the Gascons fled without waiting for rescue and leaving the food to the Balanais who took a large quantity because the country suffered greatly from famine. Grechetto Giustiniano (Note: Leonardo Giustiniano, nicknamed Grechetto, a Genovese sergeant-major in Calvi then Captain at Bastia.) was sent by Quilico Spinola, the Commissioner and colonel of Signoria who commanded at Calvi, and arrived with his company to remove remaining food and transport it to Calvi. On arrival in Algaiola five French galleys sent by Giordano (Note: Giordano Orsini, French officer who pursued the expedition to Corsica for Marshall Thermes) to prevent the Calvi troops from leaving.

"On these galleys were five Gascon companies who landed on the shore. When they saw that the Genovese soldiers took the food from Algaiola they barred the way. Surprised by such a sudden attack the Genovese fled and returned to Calvi." - Marc' Antonio Ceccaldi in Chronicle, translated by Father Letteron in History of Corsica - Volume II, page 201 (in French).

The Genovese who were at Calvi however gave little rest to their enemies in the vicinity. On their departure from Balagne the French burned a few towers in villages favourable to the Genovese. When they were gone the Genoese came out in turn from Calvi and burned the towers remaining in villages who favoured the French, including that of Francesco of Sant'Antonino and several others. They then razed the walls of Algaiola to their foundations to prevent the French from establishing themselves in the future.

=== Genovese Algajola ===
In 1643 Arpagiola was taken and sacked by the Ottomans. The Barbary pirates also came to take their tribute of slaves. The Genovese who persisted in demanding the demolition of the towers and castles and prohibiting the carrying of weapons except on the coast where four rifles were permitted in Algajola. Two years later there was nothing but ruins.

In 1664 Genoa did fortify the castle which remained the residence of the Lieutenant until 1764.

Algajola later became a community of the Pieve of Regino, one of the three pieves in the Regino Valley.

==== Algajola during the great revolt against Genoa ====
Extracts from the Chronology written by Antoine Dominic Monti, president of the ADECEC, published by them in 1979

1730

- 21 February. Genovese Governor Felice Pinelli, elected on 1 April 1728, learns that Farinole, Patrimonio, Saint-Florent, and Algajola are besieged and that Corte and Rogliano have fallen into the hands of the Corsicans. He sends Balagne Petru Pizzini, one of the Twelve-Nobles, and Lieutenant Domenico Maria Mariani.
- March. Algajola is besieged for several days.

1731

- March. Algajola remains faithful to the Genovese Republic
- 5 April. The people of Balagne, unhappy with the corruption of Lieutenant Algajola, lay siege to the place. The inhabitants take refuge at Calvi and at Genoa without waiting for the assault. The tower of L'Île-Rousse is taken by the Corsicans.

1736

- 6 June. Theodore of Corsica passes Balagne accompanied by General Giacinto Paoli and Luigi Giafferi. The king attacks Calenzana and Algajola without much success.

1737

- October. Military situation in Balagne: Calvi, Lumio, Calenzana, and Algajola are in the hands of the Genovese; the Nationalists are at Montemagiore, Lunghignani, Cassano, Zilia, Corbara, Monticello, and Santa-Reparata-di-Balagna.

1739

- 18 May. The Corsicans attack Piève and Algajola without success.

1745

- until 29 November. A circular from Domenico Rivarola (Note: Count Dumenicu Rivarola, the former Consul of Spain in Bastia, who lived at Livorno where he recruited Corsicans for the Spanish army. His son, Francesco Rivarola, a doctor, in 1735 was lieutenant-colonel of the Corsican regiment in the service of the Kingdom of Aragon) announces the taking of Bastia, San Pellegrino, and Padulella to the residents of Balagne and their commend to blockade Calvi, Algajola, and Ile Rousse.

1753

The French leave the island. The control of Algajola is again Genoese.

1762

- April. The Genovese fortify San Pellegrino which they have occupied again, they resist at Macinaggio and retain Algajola.
- July 17 to 18. 150 national volunteers try in vain to surprise Algajola.

1764

- 6 August. the Second Treaty of Compiègne between France and the Republic of Genoa is signed by Choiseul and Sorba. France receives initially for four years: Bastia, Ajaccio, Saint-Florent, Calvi, and Algajola. (Note: In the second Treaty of Compiègne the French troops undertook to garrison Ajaccio, Calvi, Saint-Florent, Bastia, and Algajola for only four years)

1765

Under the pretext of an exchange of prisoners between Genoa and Corsica, Marbeuf obtains an interview with Paoli. In fact the French commander wishes to maintain freedom of trade between the mandated areas and the interior. He obtains the opening of markets on Wednesdays and Saturdays for his garrisons at the Caldano Tower at Lumio, for those at Calvi and Algajola.

1767

- to 30 July. The French evacuate three seaports. Algajola is occupied by the Corsicans. Calvi is blockaded.

In 1789, the Pieve of Regino became the Canton of Algajola.

=== Contemporary Period ===
In 1954 Algajola had only 138 inhabitants and belonged to the Canton of Muro which was composed of the communes of Algajola, Aregno, Avapessa, Cateri, Feliceto, Lavatoggio, Muro, Nessa, and Speloncato.

1971-1973: new cantons were created such as the Canton of Belgodère with the merger of the former cantons of Muro, Belgodère, and Olmi-Cappella.

The electoral disputes of the commune are famous and have been the subject of numerous court decisions. The current mayor is Mr. Maurice Pariggi, retired from public service. He is close to the Radical Left Party (he was 31st on the list "For Corsica in the Republic" in local elections in 2004, Zuccarelli Alfonsi list).

== Administration ==
List of Successive Mayors

| From | To | Name | Party |
|---|---|---|---|
| 1877 | 1933 | Joseph Marie Luiggi | |
| 1935 | 1945 | Laurent Luiggi | |
| 1959 | 1959 | Laurent Luiggi | |
| 1959 | ? | Joseph Martelli | |
| 2001 | 2020 | Maurice Pariggi | PRG |
| 2020 | 2026 | François Rossi | |

== Population ==
The inhabitants of the commune are known as Algajolais or Algajolaises in French.

Historical population
| Year | Pop. | ±% p.a. |
|---|---|---|
| 1968 | 129 | — |
| 1975 | 178 | +4.71% |
| 1982 | 228 | +3.60% |
| 1990 | 211 | −0.96% |
| 1999 | 216 | +0.26% |
| 2007 | 297 | +4.06% |
| 2012 | 293 | −0.27% |
| 2017 | 358 | +4.09% |
| 2023 | 363 | +0.23% |
Source: INSEE

== Economy ==
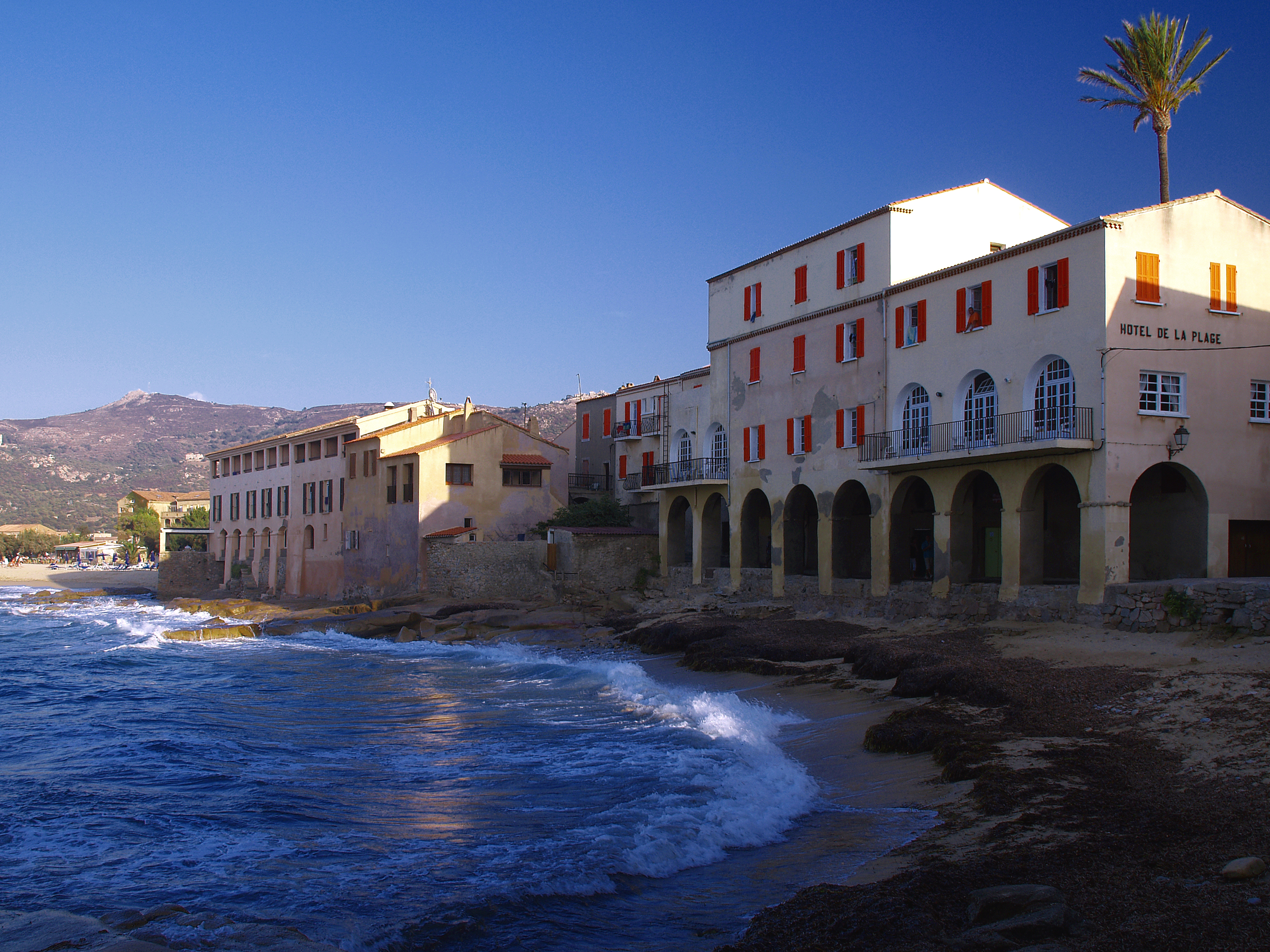
Algajola Beach Hotel

Algajola has become a popular small resort. Located in Balagne, one of the two tourist poles of Corsica, with a hinterland rich in villages and historic buildings and monuments, it is an idyllic experience for all lovers of the sea, sunsets, and good food.

== Sites and Monuments ==
=== Civil heritage ===
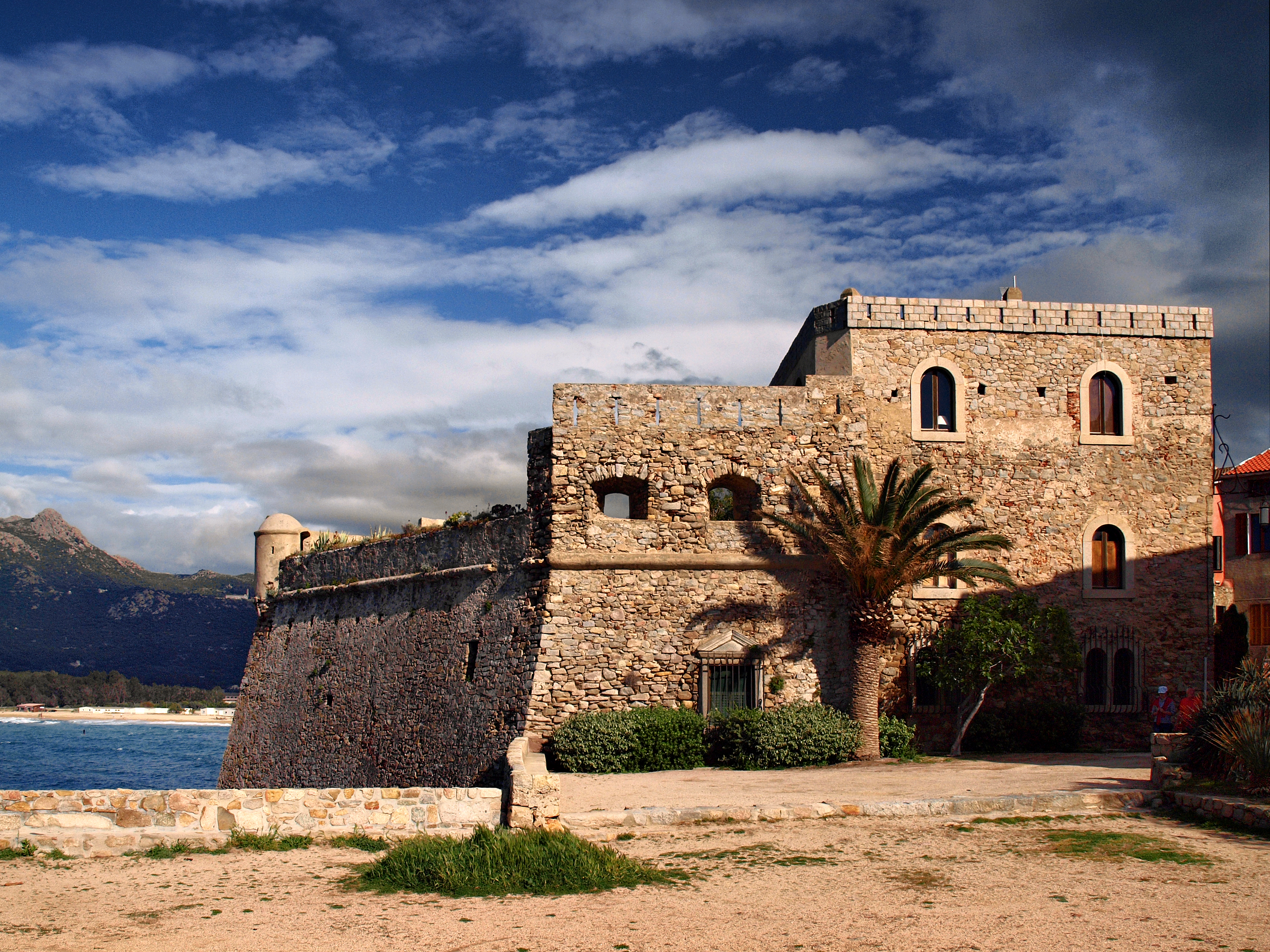
The Fort

- The Algajola Chateau-fort or U Castellu was built at the beginning of the 16th century just before 1531 on the ruins of the Lomellini Tower (Genoese nobility) to be the residence of the Governor of Balagne for Genoa until 1764. It is now privately owned. The chateau has been classified as a historical monument since 15 July 1965.
- The small Port of San Damiano. It is located 7 km west of L'Île-Rousse and 15 km from Calvi. It is sheltered by the Punta San Damiano from frequent strong winds from north to west. Once a Roman port it was abandoned at the end of the 6th century until the 12th century when there was the construction of a defensive tower. After that trade and fishing activities resumed. In 1620 the port was the second port of the island. Today Algajola has the small fishing port of San Damaiano but without all-year fishermen.
- The Citadel. Algajola was an advanced Genovese position for a long time before Calvi. Today the small fortress is well maintained and has as attractive silhouette with its protruding watchtower.

=== Religious Heritage ===
- The Parish Church of Saint-George (15th century), burned by the Saracens, then remodeled in 1618. The building integrated into the defence system of the village and has an original square bell tower. It contains two items that are registered as historical objects:
  - A Painting: Descent from the Cross (17th century) of the Italian School: owned by the commune.
  - The Gallery Organ (18th century) in ebony.
- The Chapel of Saint-Michel was built near the sea in the 12th century to the east of the village. This small maritime chapel has recently been restored from the incessant attacks of time and the sea.

=== Photo gallery ===
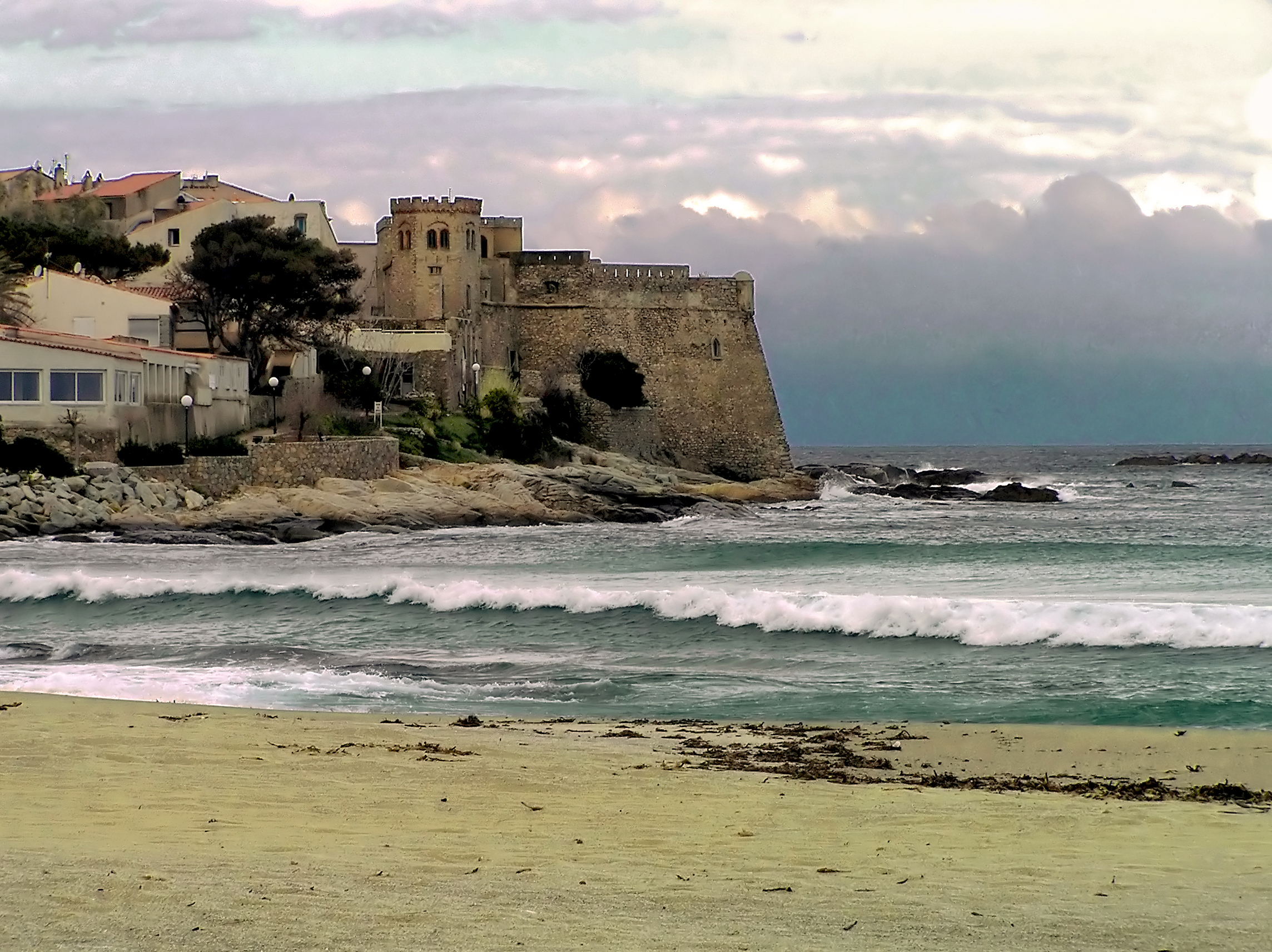
The Castle

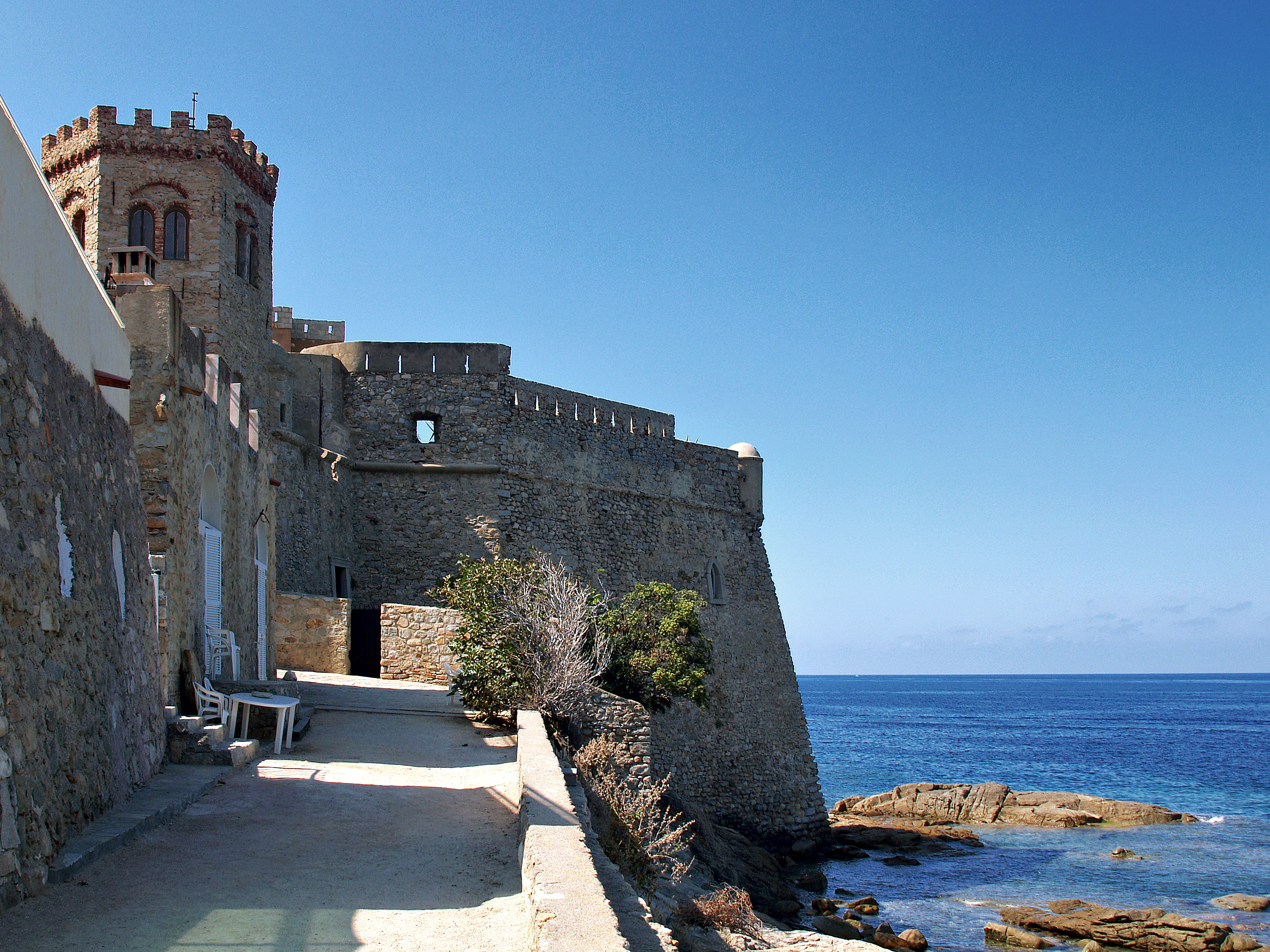
The Citadel

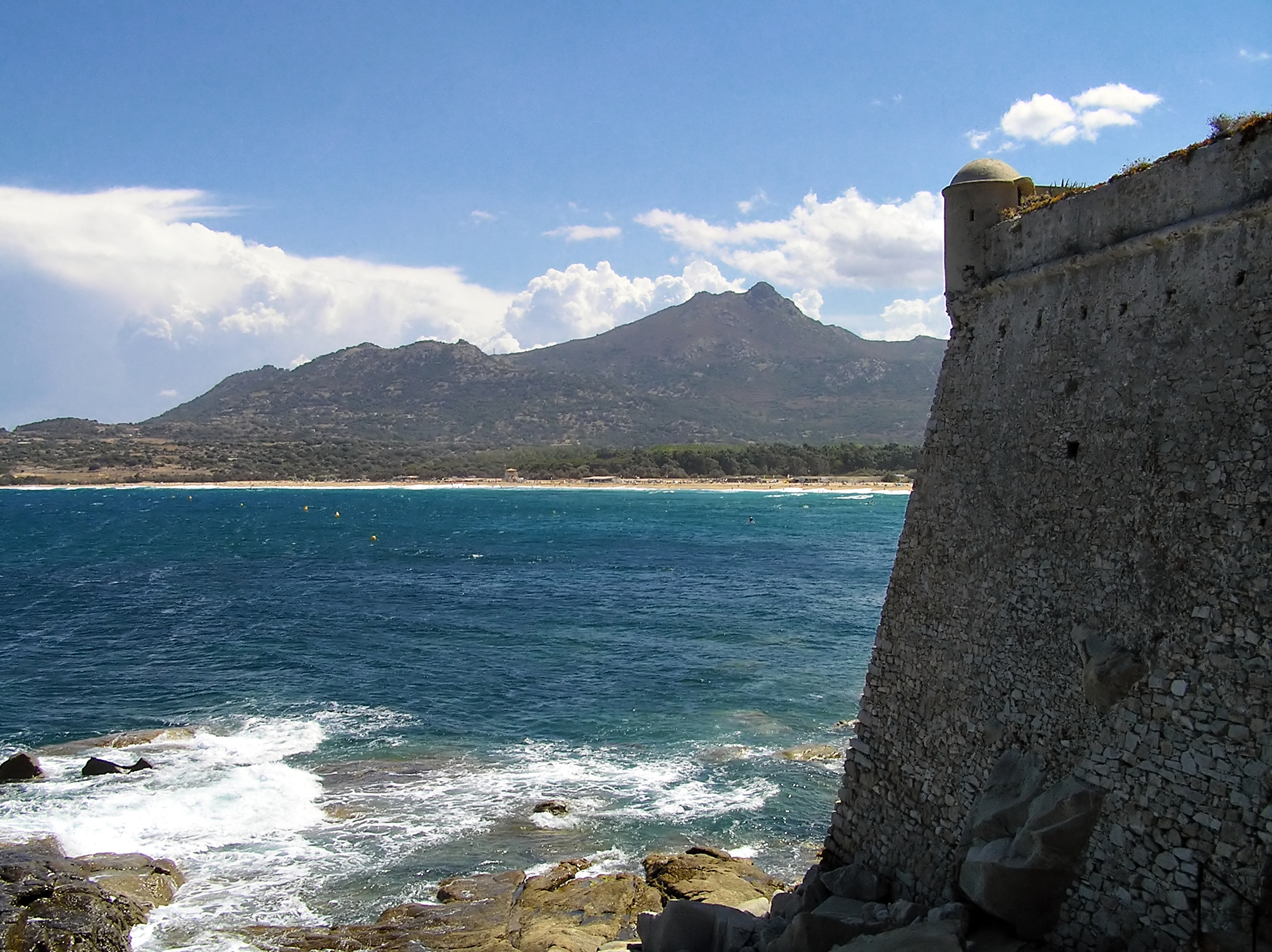
The Watchtower of the Citadel

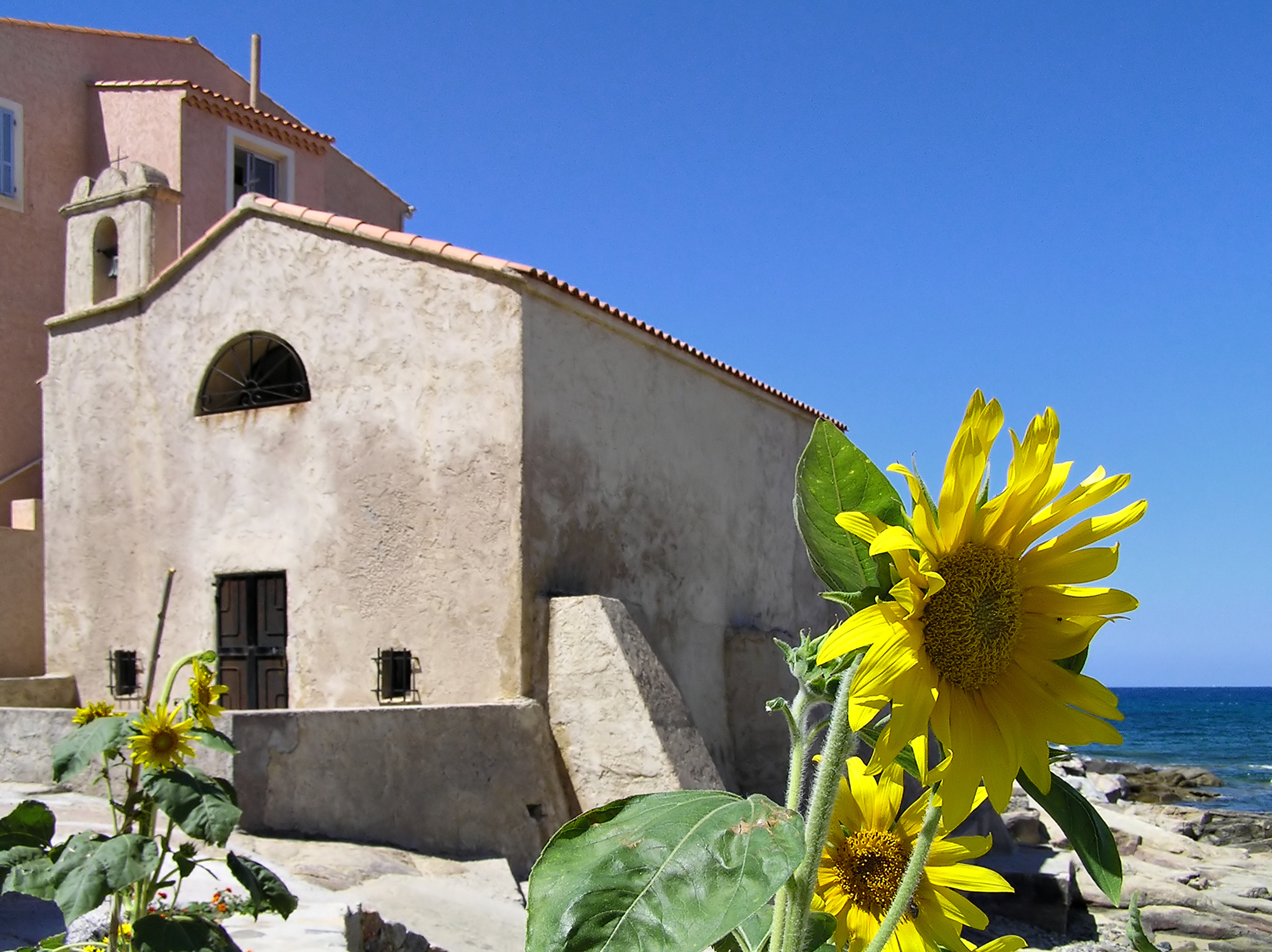
The Chapel Saint-Michel

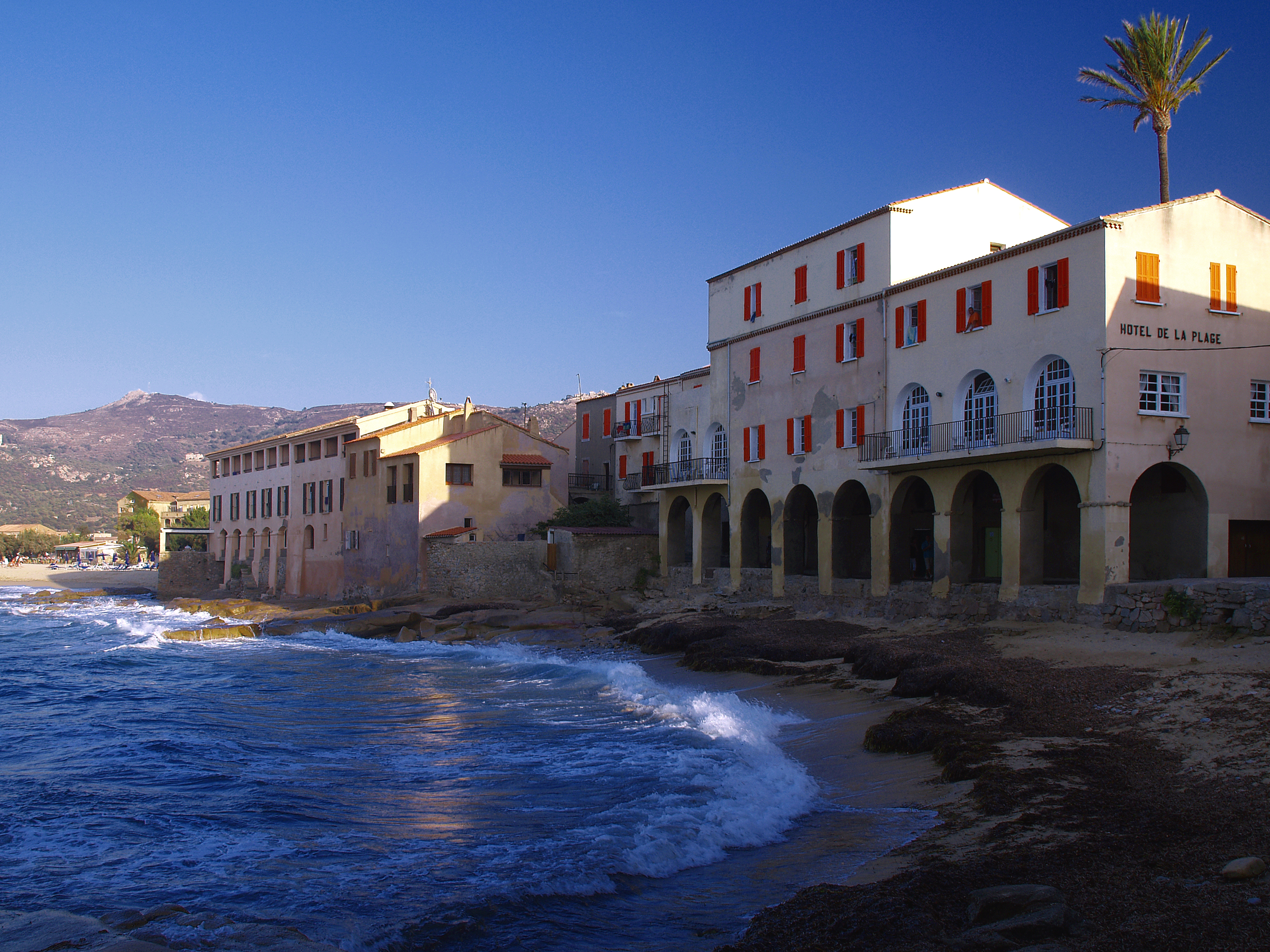
Buildings at the seaside

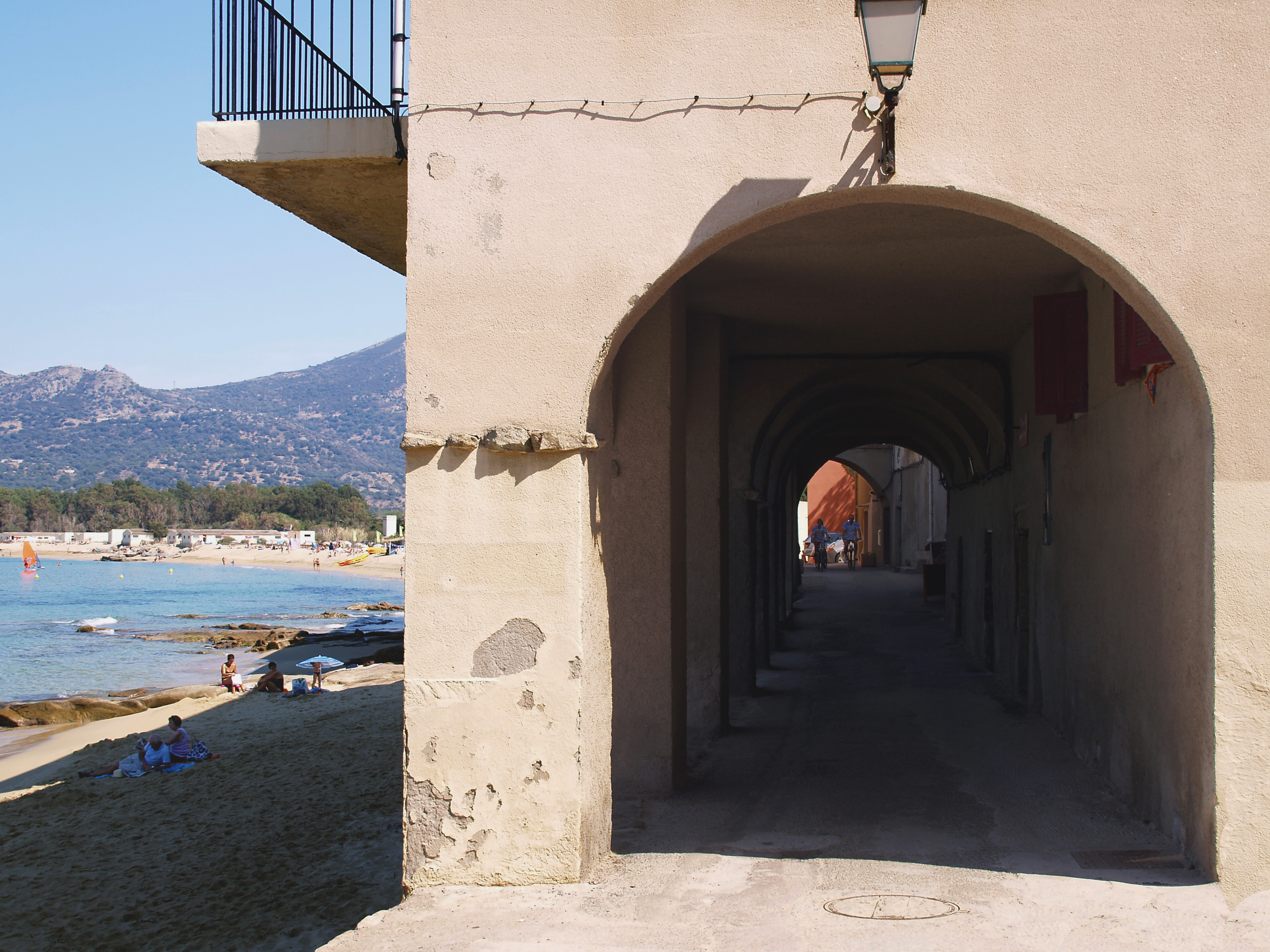
Walkway under the Beach Hotel

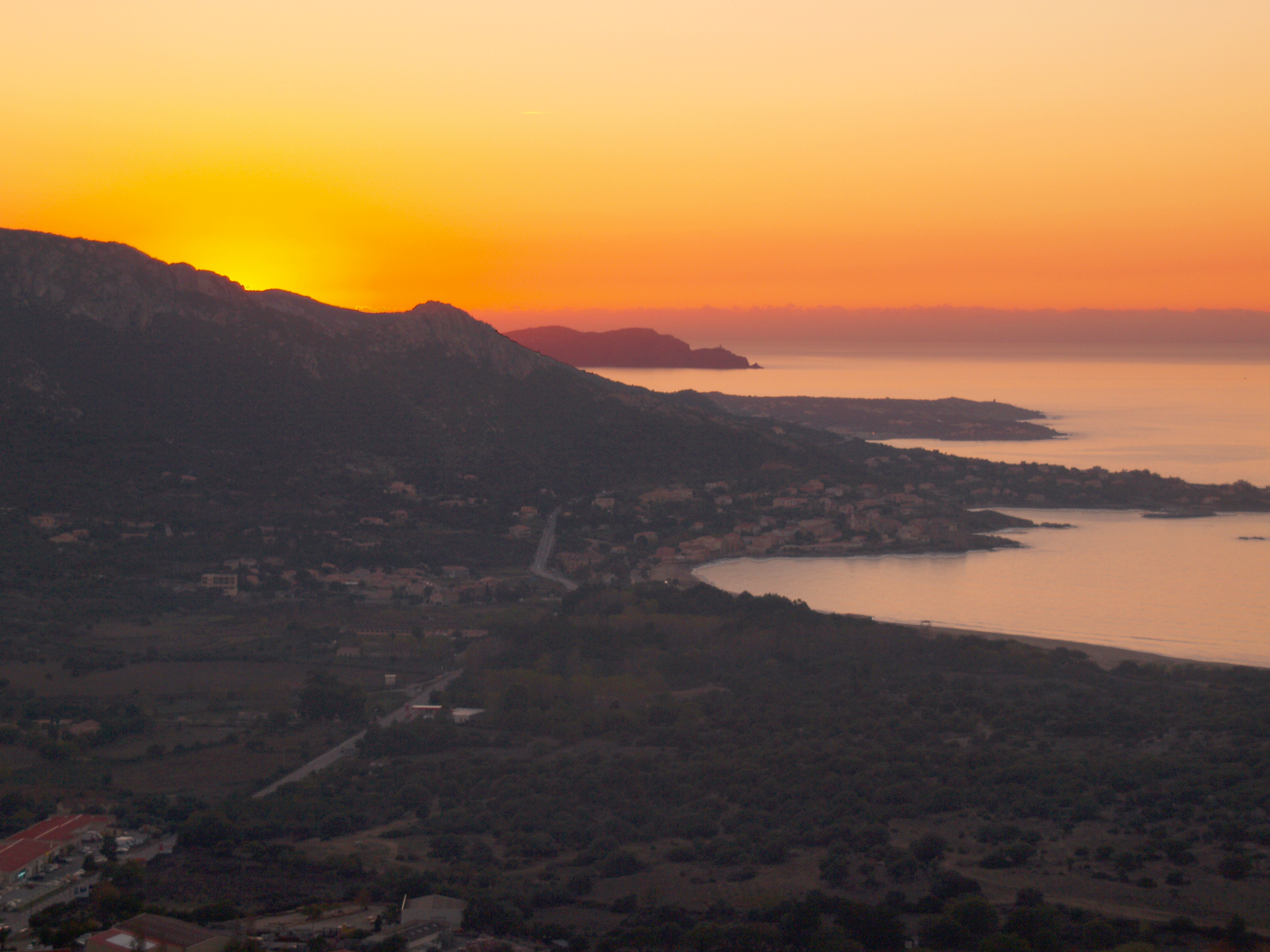
Sunset from Algajola

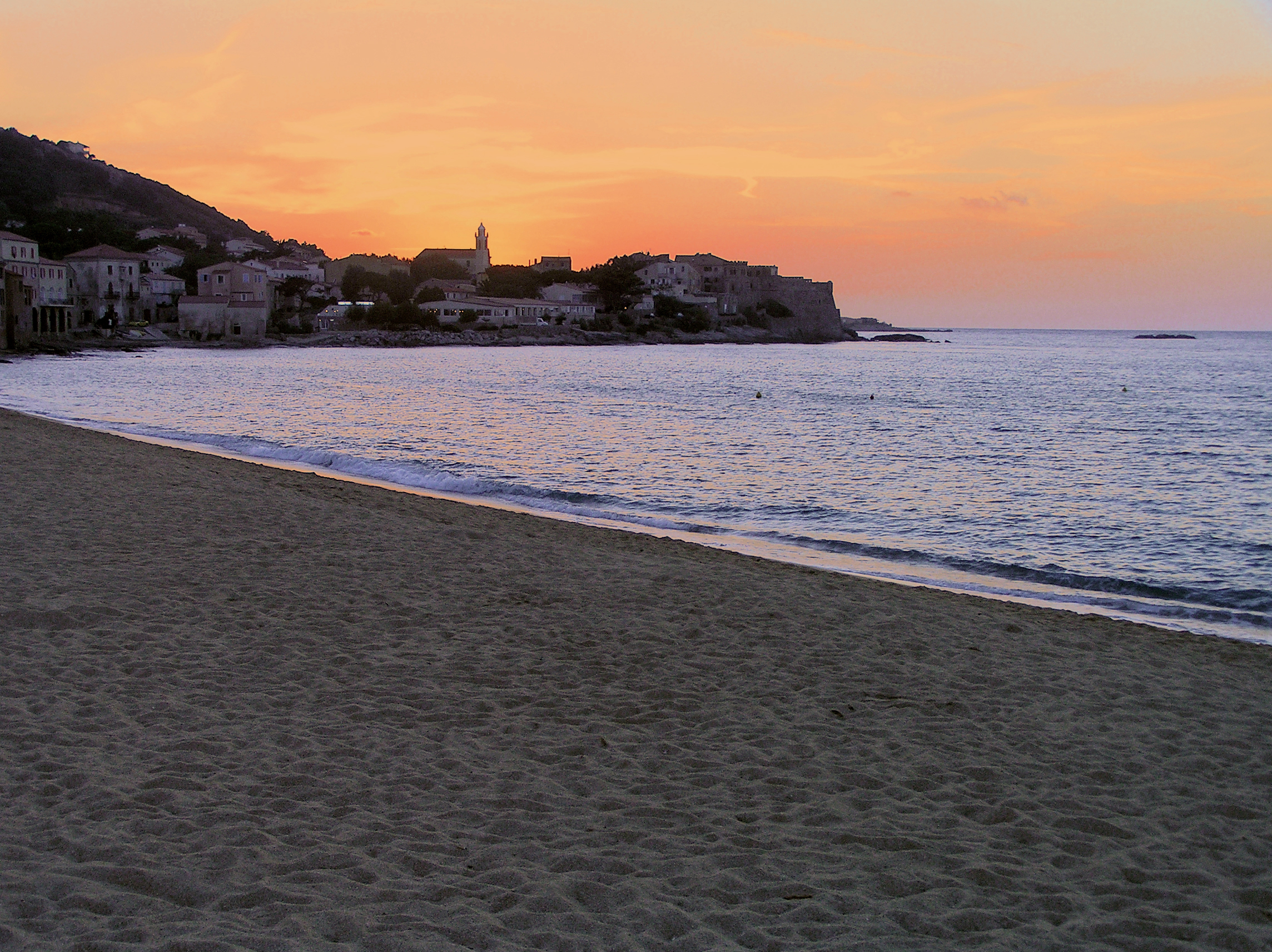
Sunset

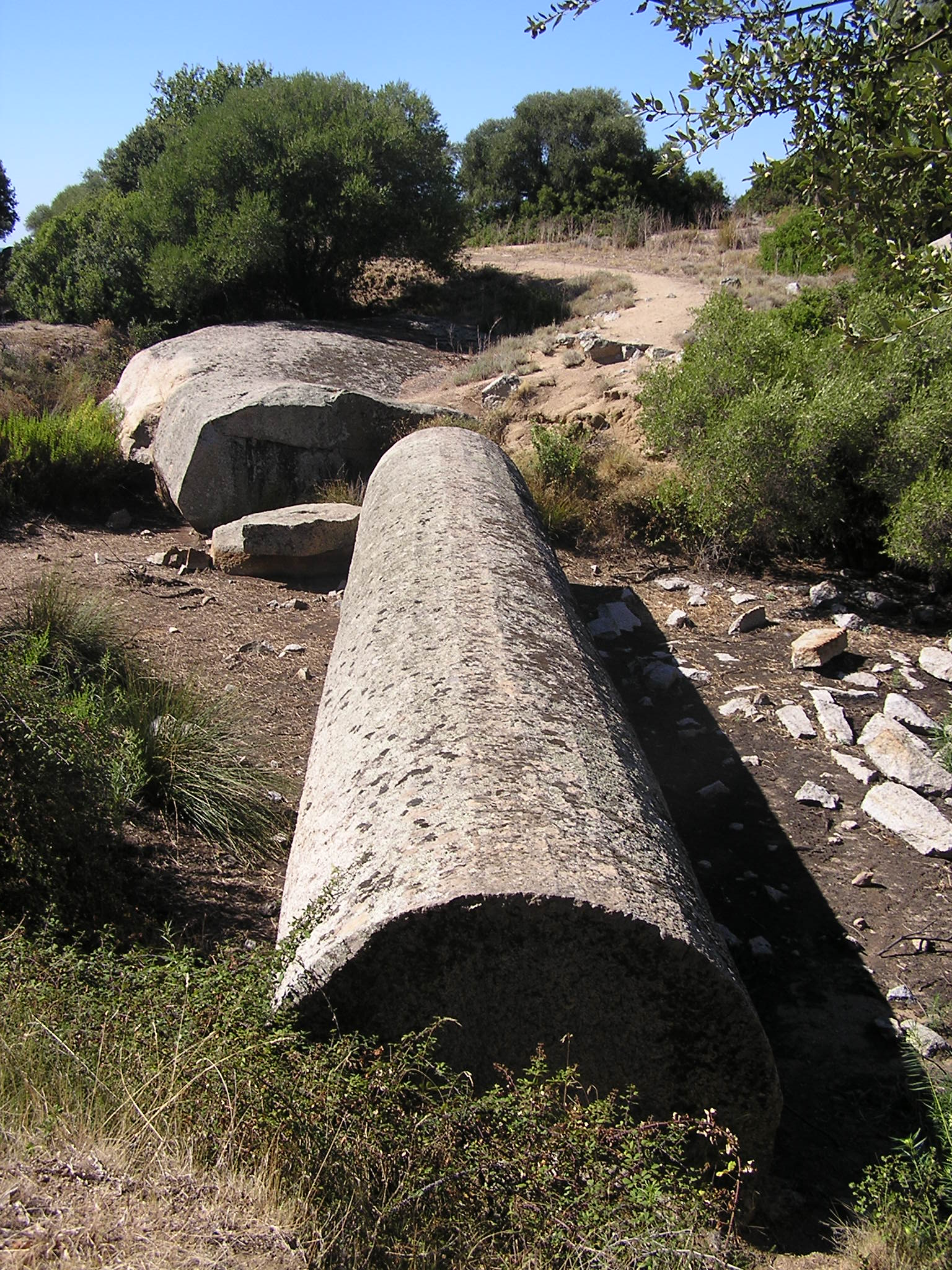
Algajola monument

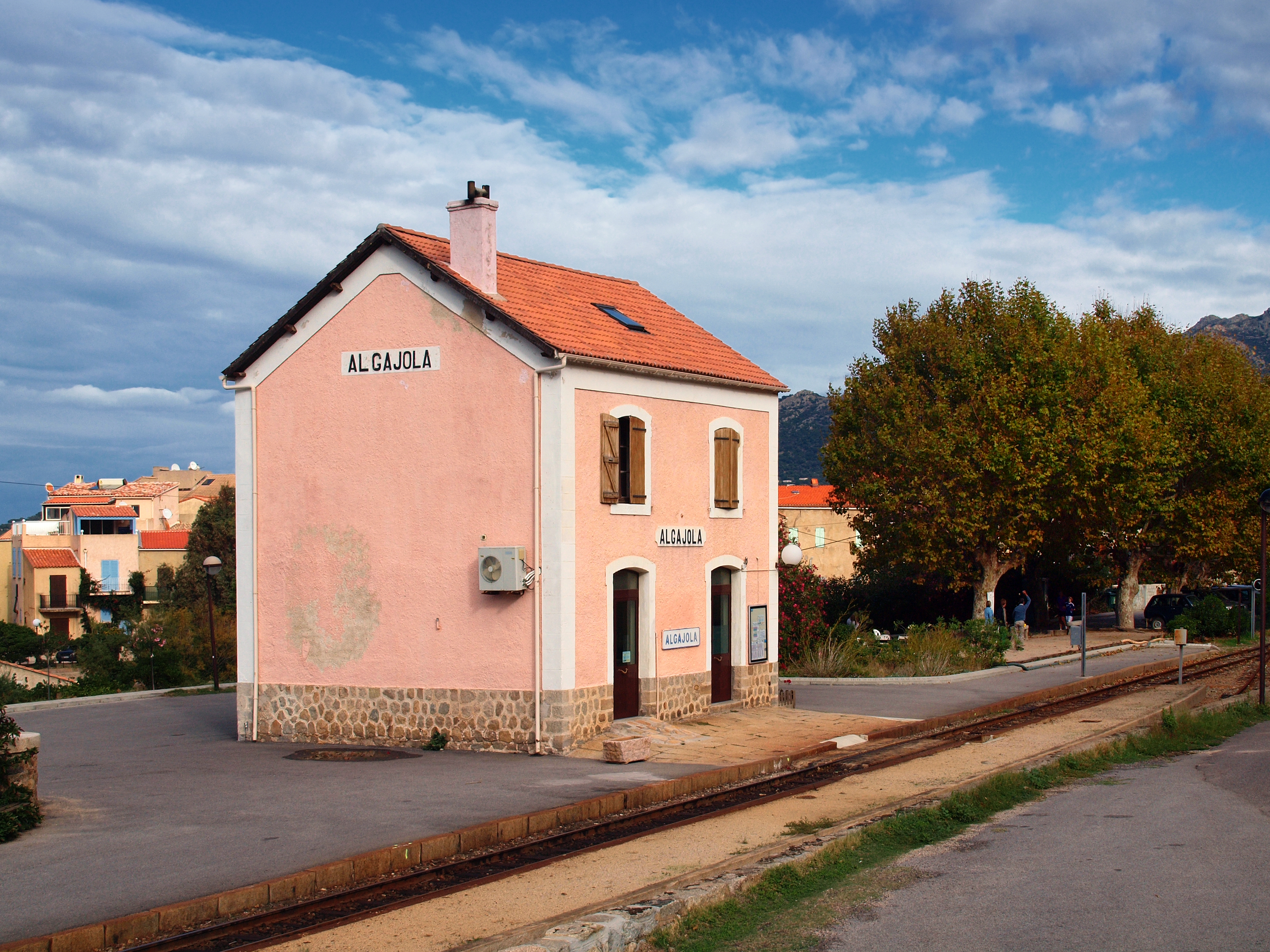
Algajola railway station

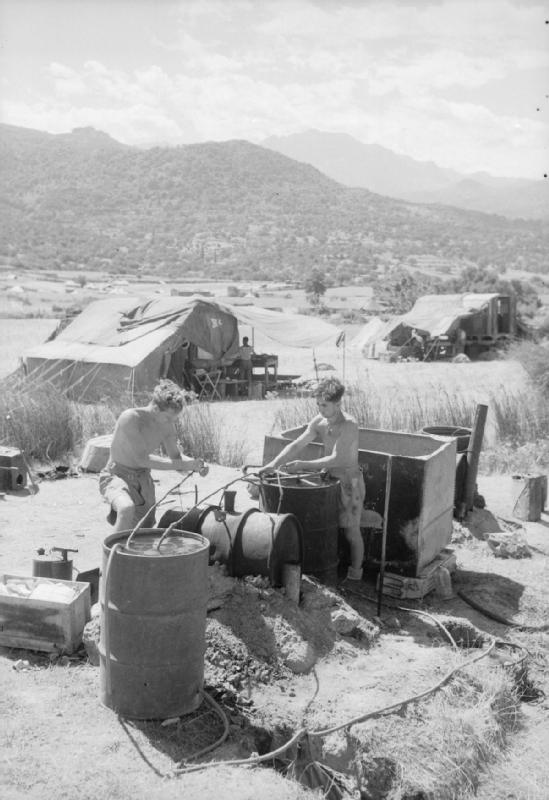
RAF Air Stores Park in Algajola, 1944-1945

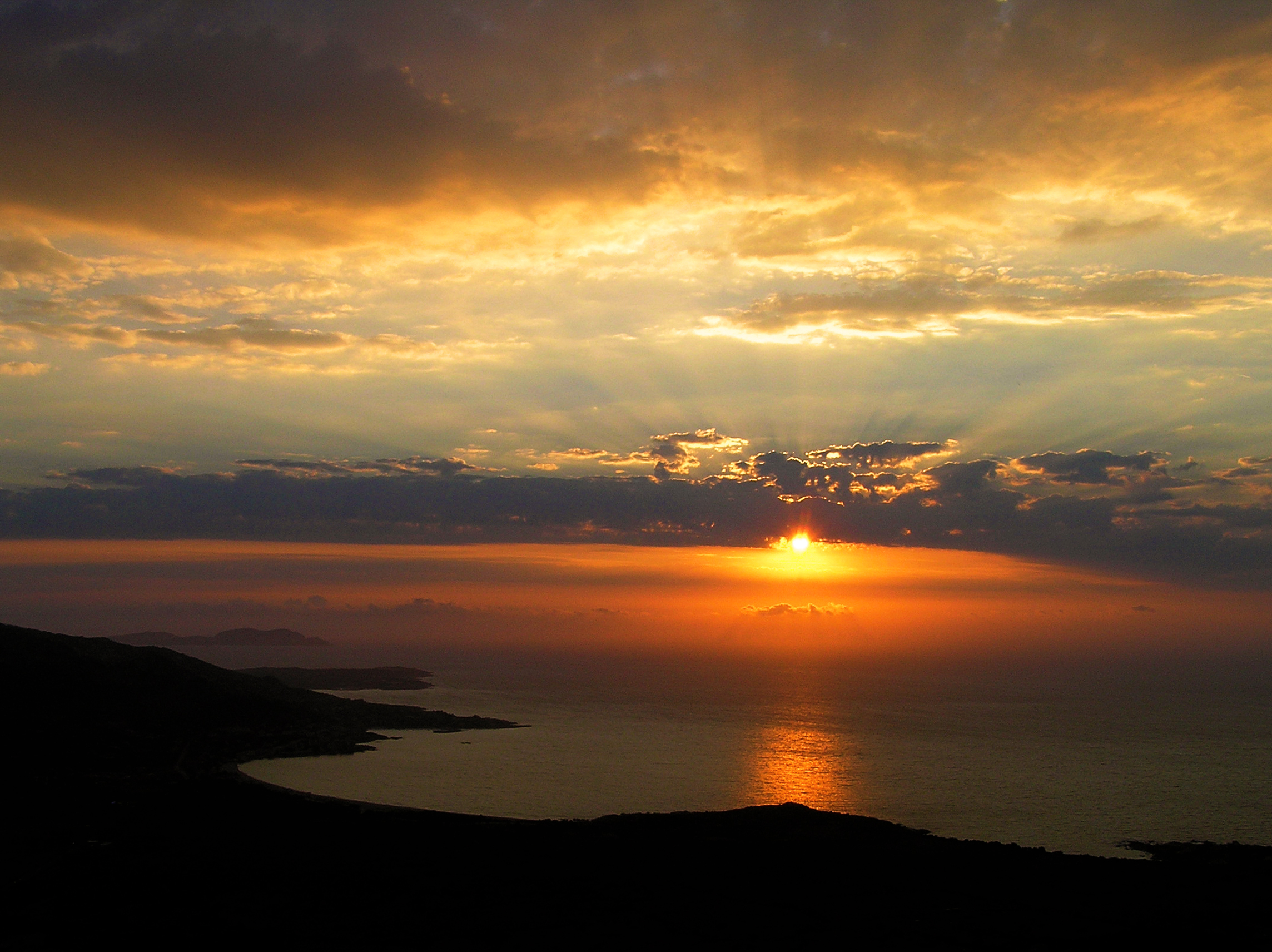
Sunset from Corbara

== Holidays and leisure activities ==
- The Caruli Art Workshop in Marina street facing the Chapel Saint-Michel. This ceramic workshop is open to the public during the summer season, from 9am to 12 and from 2pm to 5pm.
- Algajola is located on the Strada di l'Artigiani (Balagne Crafts Route) created with the support of the General Council of Upper Corsica.

== See also ==
- Communes of the Haute-Corse department
