= Ville-di-Paraso =

- Commune
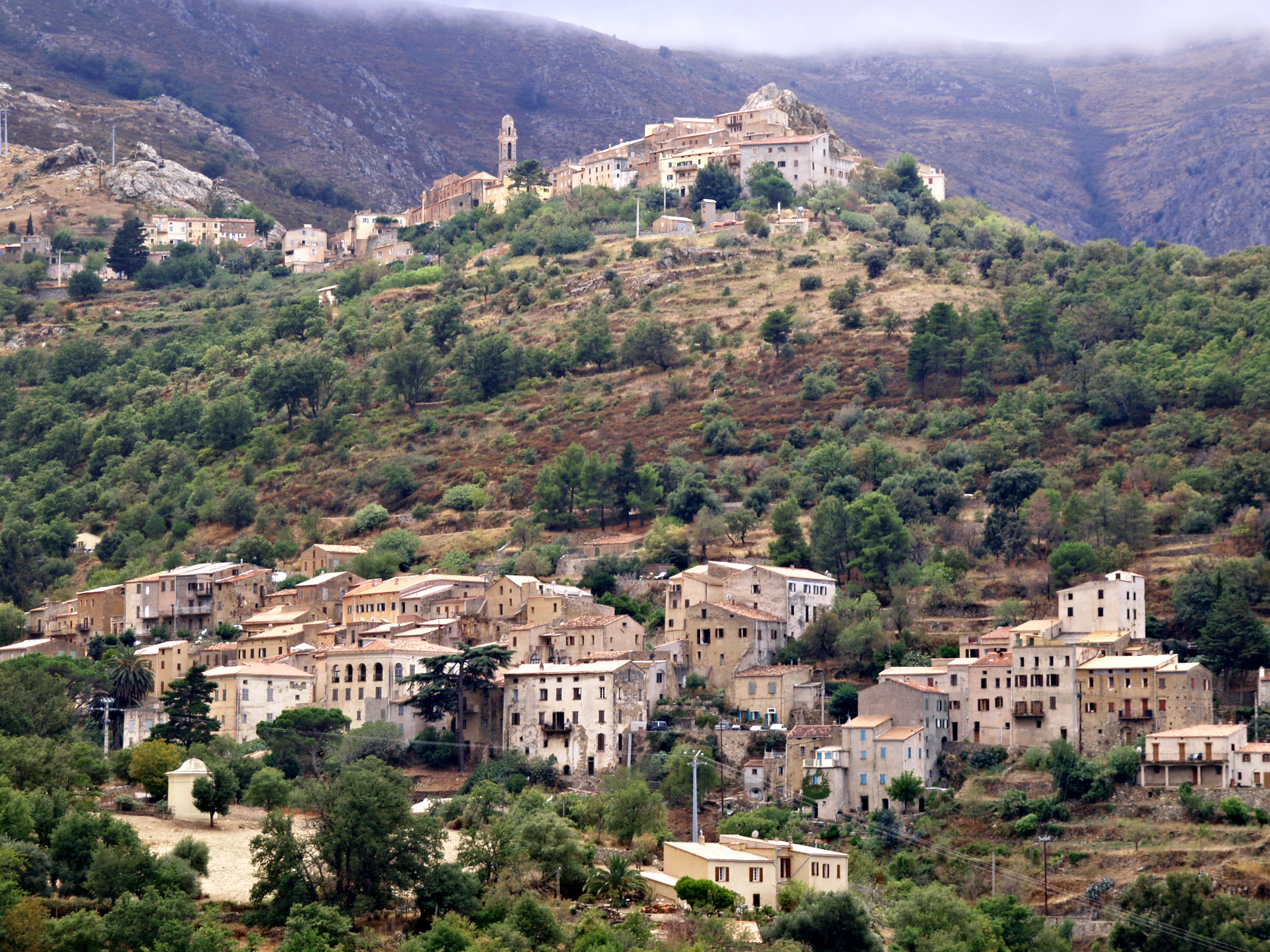
- Ville-di-Paraso overlooked by Speloncato
- Location of Ville-di-Paraso
- Location within France Location within Corsica
- Coordinates: 42°34′03″N 8°59′13″E
- Country: France
- Region: Corsica
- Department: Haute-Corse
- Arrondissement: Calvi
- Canton: L'Île-Rousse

Government
  - Mayor (2020–2026): William Monti Rossi
- Area^{1}: 9.37 km^{2} (3.62 sq mi)
- Elevation: 400 m (1,300 ft)
- Highest elevation: 1,120 m (3,670 ft)
- Lowest elevation: 32 m (105 ft)
- Population (2023): 205
  - Density: 21.9/km^{2} (56.7/sq mi)
- Time zone: UTC+01:00 (CET)
  - Summer (DST): UTC+02:00 (CEST)
- INSEE/Postal code: 2B352 /20279
- ^{1} French Land Register data, which excludes lakes, ponds, glaciers > 1 km^{2} (0.386 sq mi or 247 acres) and river estuaries.

Ville-di-Paraso is a commune in the Haute-Corse department of France on the island of Corsica.

== Population ==
Historical population
Year	Pop.	±% p.a.
1968	197	—
1975	175	−1.68%
1982	172	−0.25%
1990	168	−0.29%
1999	128	−2.98%
2007	182	+4.50%
2012	173	−1.01%
2017	213	+4.25%
2023	205	−0.64%
Source: INSEE

== See also ==
- Communes of the Haute-Corse department
