= Canton of L'Île-Rousse =

Coordinates: 42°38′08″N 8°56′17″E

The Canton of L'Île-Rousse is one of the cantons of the Haute-Corse department, France. It is entirely in the arrondissement of Calvi. in Since the French canton reorganisation which came into effect in March 2015, the communes of the canton of L'Île-Rousse are:

- Belgodère
- Corbara
- Costa
- Feliceto
- L'Île-Rousse
- Lama
- Mausoléo
- Monticello
- Muro
- Nessa
- Novella
- Occhiatana
- Olmi-Cappella
- Palasca
- Pigna
- Pioggiola
- Santa-Reparata-di-Balagna
- Speloncato
- Urtaca
- Vallica
- Ville-di-Paraso
