= Palasca =

- Commune
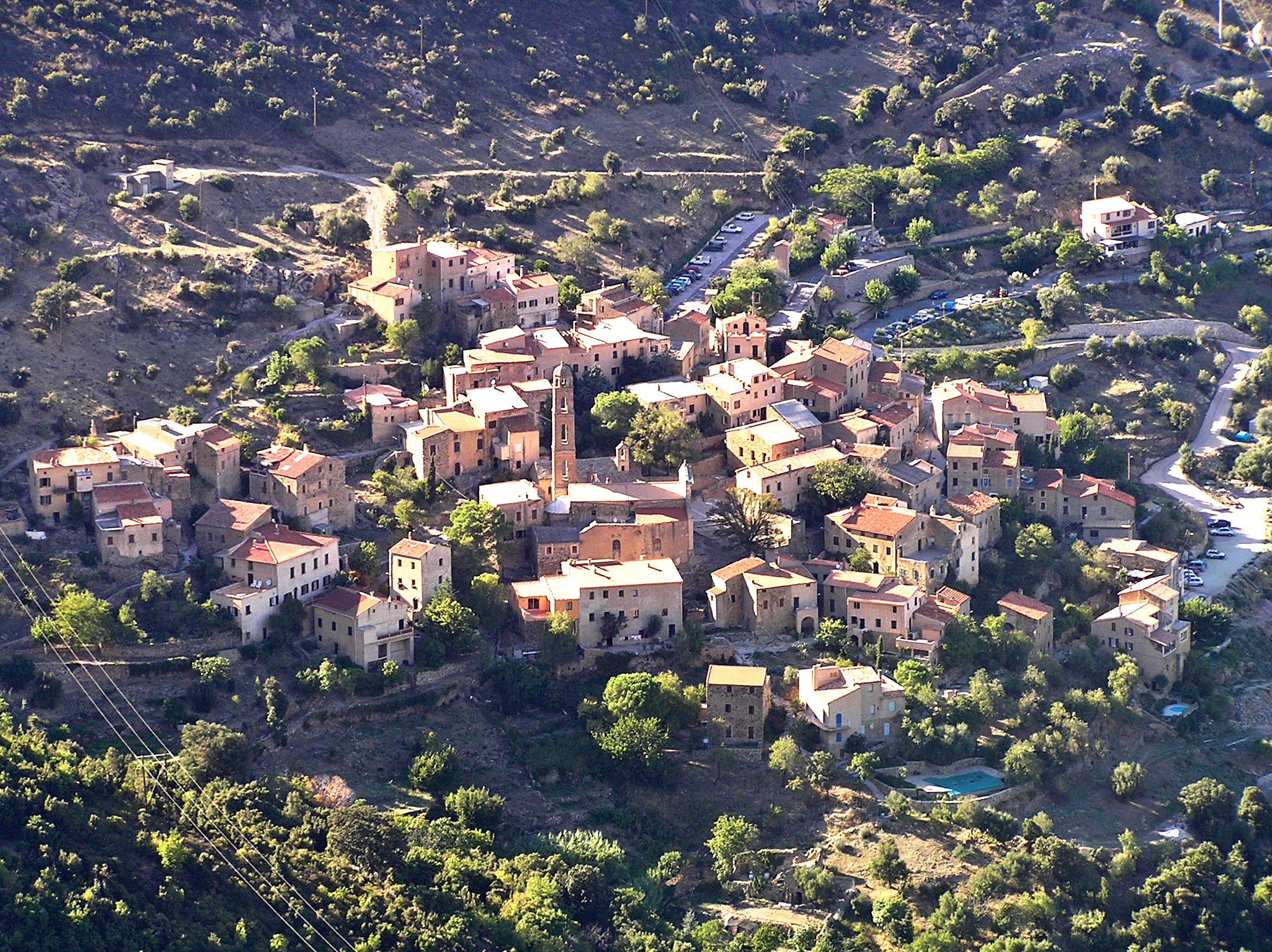
- An aerial view of Palasca
- Location of Palasca
- Location within France Location within Corsica
- Coordinates: 42°35′24″N 9°02′36″E
- Country: France
- Region: Corsica
- Department: Haute-Corse
- Arrondissement: Calvi
- Canton: L'Île-Rousse

Government
  - Mayor (2020–2026): Jean-Paul Guerrieri
- Area^{1}: 49.56 km^{2} (19.14 sq mi)
- Elevation: 350 m (1,150 ft)
- Highest elevation: 794 m (2,605 ft)
- Lowest elevation: 0 m (0 ft)
- Population (2023): 222
  - Density: 4.48/km^{2} (11.6/sq mi)
- Time zone: UTC+01:00 (CET)
  - Summer (DST): UTC+02:00 (CEST)
- INSEE/Postal code: 2B199 /20226
- ^{1} French Land Register data, which excludes lakes, ponds, glaciers > 1 km^{2} (0.386 sq mi or 247 acres) and river estuaries.

Palasca (French pronunciation: [palaska]) is a commune in the Haute-Corse department of France on the island of Corsica.

== Population ==
Historical population
Year	Pop.	±% p.a.
1968	72	—
1975	84	+2.23%
1982	85	+0.17%
1990	115	+3.85%
1999	117	+0.19%
2007	134	+1.71%
2012	153	+2.69%
2017	170	+2.13%
2023	222	+4.55%
Source: INSEE

== See also ==
- Communes of the Haute-Corse department
