= Novella, Haute-Corse =

Novella
- Commune
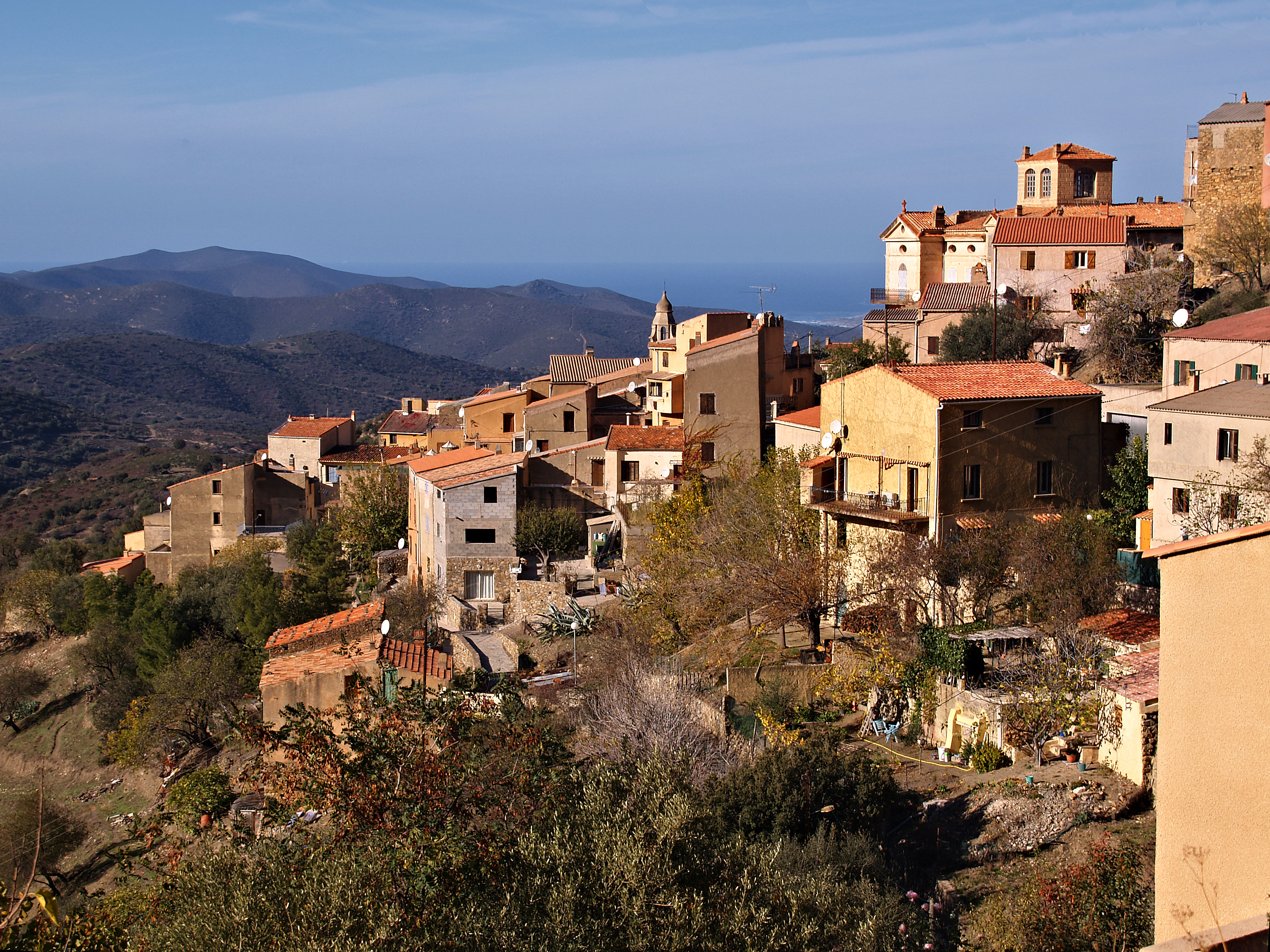
- A general view of Novella village
- Location of Novella
- Location within France Location within Corsica
- Coordinates: 42°35′07″N 9°07′04″E
- Country: France
- Region: Corsica
- Department: Haute-Corse
- Arrondissement: Calvi
- Canton: L'Île-Rousse

Government
  - Mayor (2020–2026): Jean Louis Massiani
- Area^{1}: 30.23 km^{2} (11.67 sq mi)
- Elevation: 400 m (1,300 ft)
- Highest elevation: 821 m (2,694 ft)
- Lowest elevation: 14 m (46 ft)
- Population (2023): 80
  - Density: 2.6/km^{2} (6.9/sq mi)
- Time zone: UTC+01:00 (CET)
  - Summer (DST): UTC+02:00 (CEST)
- INSEE/Postal code: 2B180 /20211
- ^{1} French Land Register data, which excludes lakes, ponds, glaciers > 1 km^{2} (0.386 sq mi or 247 acres) and river estuaries.

Novella (French pronunciation: [nɔvɛla]; Corsican: Nuvella) is a commune in the Haute-Corse department of France on the island of Corsica.

== Population ==
Historical population
Year	Pop.	±% p.a.
1968	121	—
1975	110	−1.35%
1982	97	−1.78%
1990	55	−6.85%
1999	68	+2.39%
2007	80	+2.05%
2012	88	+1.92%
2017	83	−1.16%
2023	80	−0.61%
Source: INSEE

== See also ==
- Communes of the Haute-Corse department
