= Lama, Haute-Corse =

Lama
- Commune
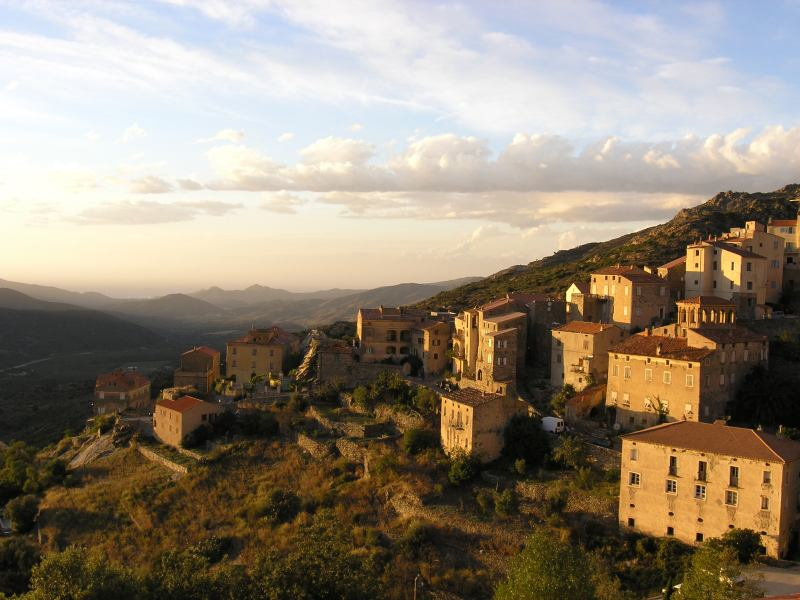
- Lama and the Ostriconi valley
- Location of Lama
- Location within France Location within Corsica
- Coordinates: 42°34′39″N 9°10′22″E
- Country: France
- Region: Corsica
- Department: Haute-Corse
- Arrondissement: Calvi
- Canton: L'Île-Rousse

Government
  - Mayor (2020–2026): Attilius Ceccaldi
- Area^{1}: 19.92 km^{2} (7.69 sq mi)
- Elevation: 480 m (1,570 ft)
- Highest elevation: 1,535 m (5,036 ft)
- Lowest elevation: 120 m (390 ft)
- Population (2023): 155
  - Density: 7.78/km^{2} (20.2/sq mi)
- Time zone: UTC+01:00 (CET)
  - Summer (DST): UTC+02:00 (CEST)
- INSEE/Postal code: 2B136 /20218
- ^{1} French Land Register data, which excludes lakes, ponds, glaciers > 1 km^{2} (0.386 sq mi or 247 acres) and river estuaries.

Lama (French pronunciation: [lama]) is a commune in the Haute-Corse department of France on the island of Corsica.

== Population ==
Historical population
Year	Pop.	±% p.a.
1968	237	—
1975	174	−4.32%
1982	120	−5.17%
1990	98	−2.50%
1999	130	+3.19%
2007	171	+3.49%
2012	164	−0.83%
2017	151	−1.64%
2023	155	+0.44%
Source: INSEE

== See also ==
- Communes of the Haute-Corse department
