= Arrondissement of Calvi =

Coordinates: 42.5686°N 8.7569°E

Calvi
- Arrondissement
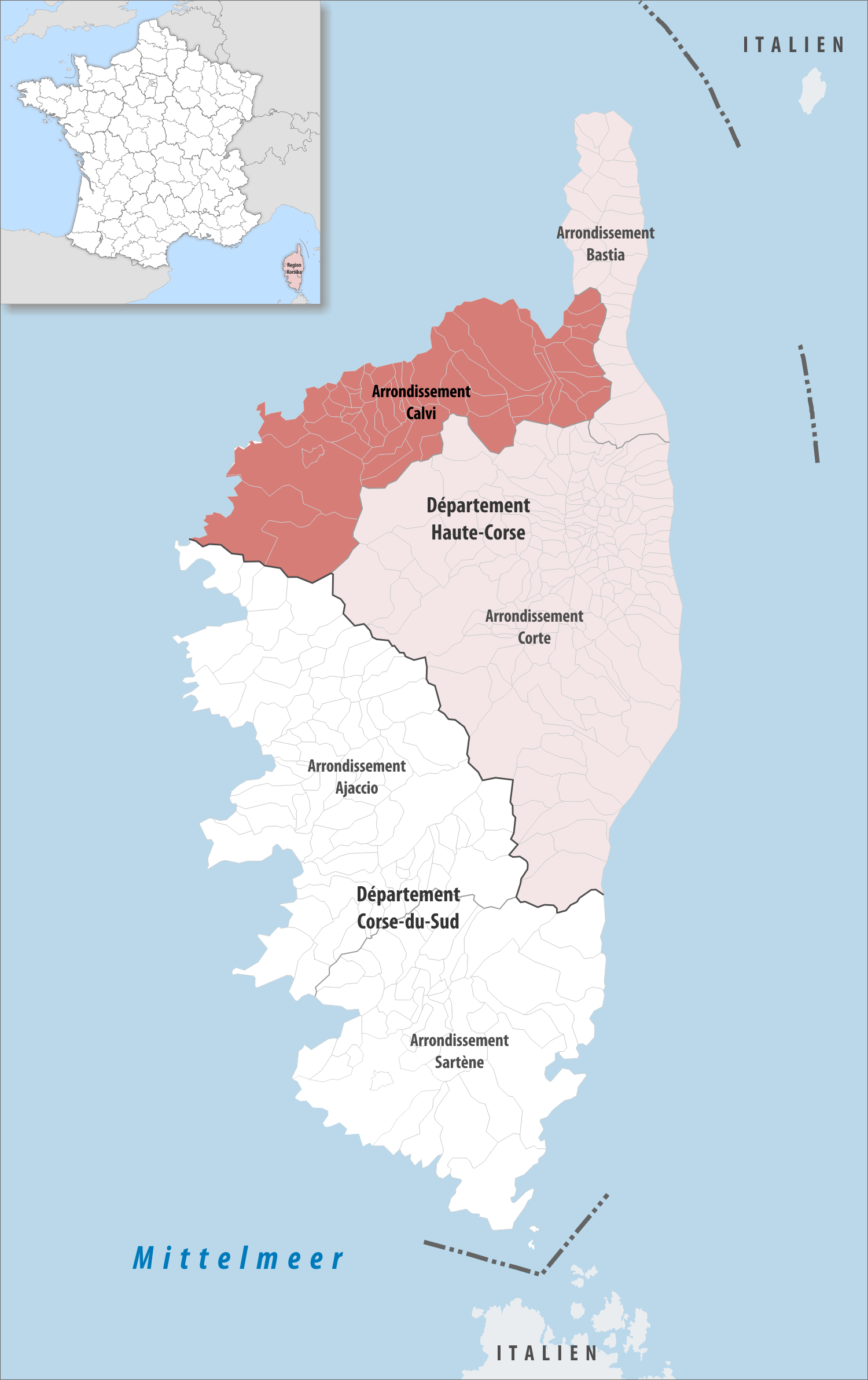
- Location within the region Corsica
- Country: France
- Region: Corsica
- Department: Haute-Corse
- No. of communes: {{{nbcomm}}}
- Area: 1,338.4 km^{2} (516.8 sq mi)
- Population (2023): 31,823
  - Density: 23.777/km^{2} (61.582/sq mi)
- INSEE code: 2B5

The arrondissement of Calvi (Corsican: circundariu di Calvi) is an arrondissement of France in the Haute-Corse department in the territorial collectivity of Corsica. It has 51 communes. Its population is 31,219 (2021), and its area is 1,338.4 km^{2} (516.8 sq mi).

== Composition ==
The communes of the arrondissement of Calvi, and their INSEE codes, are:

1. Algajola (2B010)
2. Aregno (2B020)
3. Avapessa (2B025)
4. Barbaggio (2B029)
5. Belgodère (2B034)
6. Calenzana (2B049)
7. Calvi (2B050)
8. Cateri (2B084)
9. Corbara (2B093)
10. Costa (2B097)
11. Farinole (2B109)
12. Feliceto (2B112)
13. Galéria (2B121)
14. L'Île-Rousse (2B134)
15. Lama (2B136)
16. Lavatoggio (2B138)
17. Lumio (2B150)
18. Manso (2B153)
19. Mausoléo (2B156)
20. Moncale (2B165)
21. Montegrosso (2B167)
22. Monticello (2B168)
23. Murato (2B172)
24. Muro (2B173)
25. Nessa (2B175)
26. Novella (2B180)
27. Occhiatana (2B182)
28. Oletta (2B185)
29. Olmeta-di-Tuda (2B188)
30. Olmi-Cappella (2B190)
31. Palasca (2B199)
32. Patrimonio (2B205)
33. Pietralba (2B223)
34. Piève (2B230)
35. Pigna (2B231)
36. Pioggiola (2B235)
37. Poggio-d'Oletta (2B239)
38. Rapale (2B257)
39. Rutali (2B265)
40. Saint-Florent (2B298)
41. San-Gavino-di-Tenda (2B301)
42. Sant'Antonino (2B296)
43. Santa-Reparata-di-Balagna (2B316)
44. Santo-Pietro-di-Tenda (2B314)
45. Sorio (2B287)
46. Speloncato (2B290)
47. Urtaca (2B332)
48. Vallecalle (2B333)
49. Vallica (2B339)
50. Ville-di-Paraso (2B352)
51. Zilia (2B361)

== History ==
The arrondissement of Calvi was created as part of the department Golo in 1800. In 1811 it became an arrondissement of the department Corse. It was disbanded in 1926 and restored in 1943. Since 1976 it has been an arrondissement of the department Haute-Corse. On 1 January 2010, it gained the two cantons of Le Haut-Nebbio and La Conca-d'Oro from the arrondissement of Bastia.

As a result of the reorganisation of the cantons of France which came into effect in 2015, the borders of the cantons are no longer related to the borders of the arrondissements. The cantons of the arrondissement of Calvi were, as of January 2015:

1. Belgodère
2. Calenzana
3. Calvi
4. La Conca-d'Oro
5. Le Haut-Nebbio
6. L'Île-Rousse

== Sub-prefects ==
- Pierre-Henry Maccioni : on 1 March 1982
