= Vallica =

- Commune
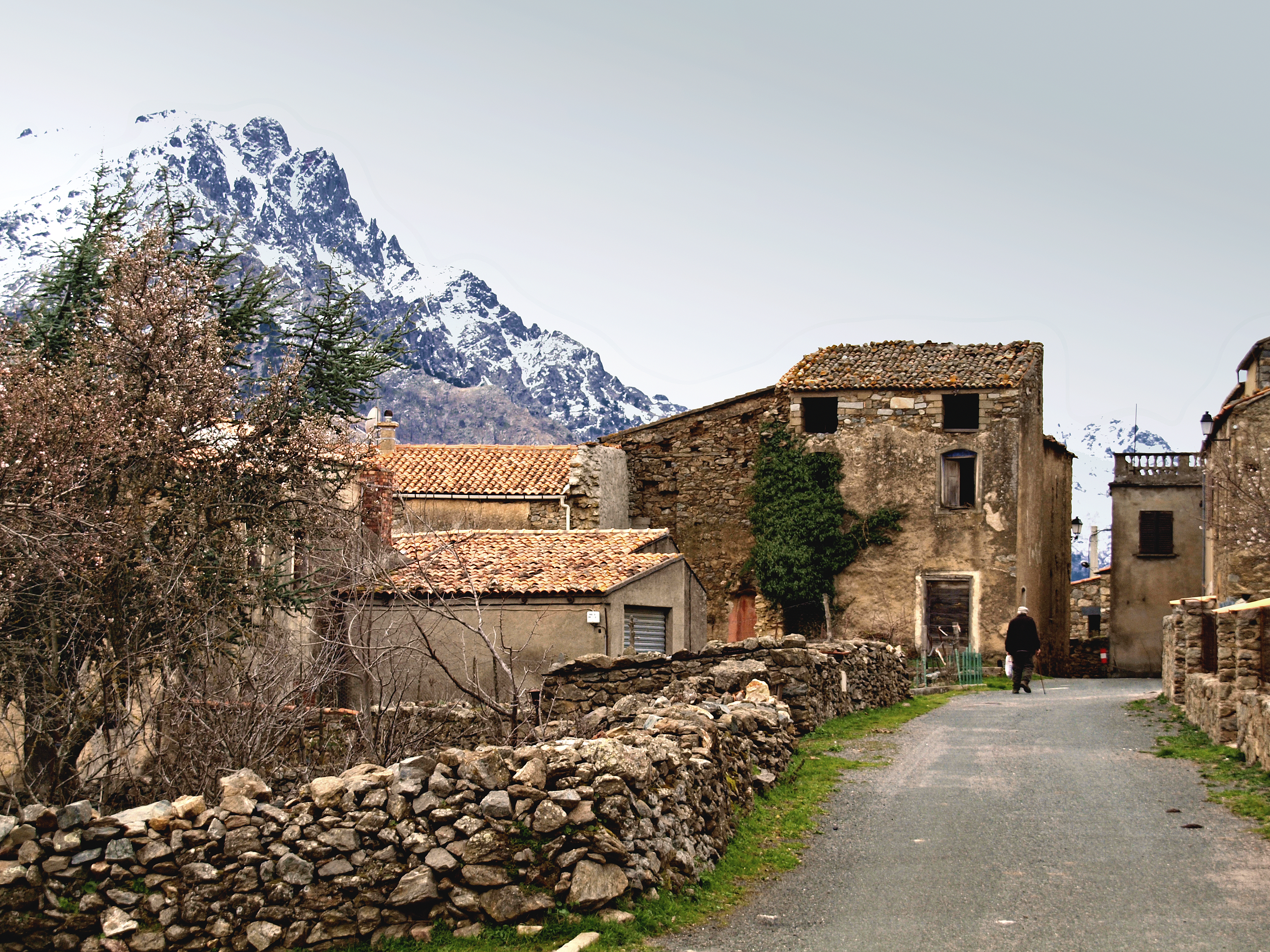
- The village of Vallica, overlooked by Monte Padro
- Location of Vallica
- Location within France Location within Corsica
- Coordinates: 42°31′19″N 9°03′07″E
- Country: France
- Region: Corsica
- Department: Haute-Corse
- Arrondissement: Calvi
- Canton: L'Île-Rousse
- Intercommunality: l'Île-Rousse - Balagne

Government
  - Mayor (2023–2026): Jean-René Castellani
- Area^{1}: 12.07 km^{2} (4.66 sq mi)
- Elevation: 800 m (2,600 ft)
- Highest elevation: 1,117 m (3,665 ft)
- Lowest elevation: 388 m (1,273 ft)
- Population (2023): 29
  - Density: 2.4/km^{2} (6.2/sq mi)
- Time zone: UTC+01:00 (CET)
  - Summer (DST): UTC+02:00 (CEST)
- INSEE/Postal code: 2B339 /20259
- ^{1} French Land Register data, which excludes lakes, ponds, glaciers > 1 km^{2} (0.386 sq mi or 247 acres) and river estuaries.

Vallica (French pronunciation: [valika]; Corsican: A Vallica) is a commune in the Haute-Corse department of France on the island of Corsica.

== Geography ==
It is situated in the Giussani Valley with Olmi Cappella being its closest neighbor village.

== Population ==
Historical population
Year	Pop.	±% p.a.
1968	66	—
1975	55	−2.57%
1982	45	−2.83%
1990	41	−1.16%
1999	27	−4.54%
2007	41	+5.36%
2012	24	−10.16%
2017	26	+1.61%
2023	29	+1.84%
Source: INSEE

== Events ==
Once a year, Vallica is one of the few villages in the Giussani that host the Aria theater festival. The festival was created by French actor Robin Renucci in 1998.

== See also ==
- Communes of the Haute-Corse department
