= Mausoléo =

- Commune
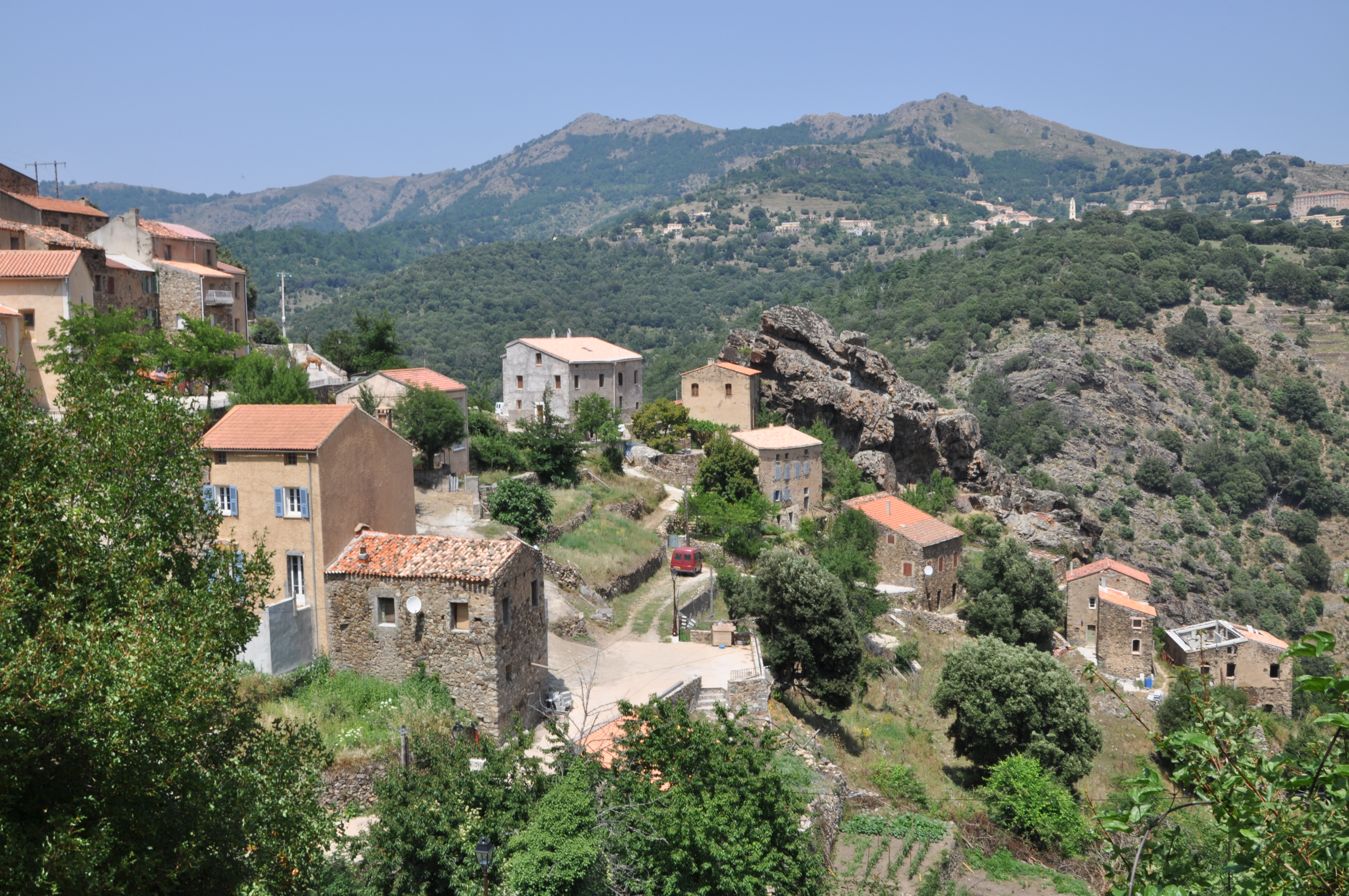
- A general view of Mausoléo
- Location of Mausoléo
- Location within France Location within Corsica
- Coordinates: 42°31′14″N 9°00′32″E
- Country: France
- Region: Corsica
- Department: Haute-Corse
- Arrondissement: Calvi
- Canton: L'Île-Rousse

Government
  - Mayor (2020–2026): Jean Toussaint Antonelli
- Area^{1}: 19.43 km^{2} (7.50 sq mi)
- Elevation: 720 m (2,360 ft)
- Highest elevation: 2,030 m (6,660 ft)
- Lowest elevation: 527 m (1,729 ft)
- Population (2023): 24
  - Density: 1.2/km^{2} (3.2/sq mi)
- Time zone: UTC+01:00 (CET)
  - Summer (DST): UTC+02:00 (CEST)
- INSEE/Postal code: 2B156 /20259
- ^{1} French Land Register data, which excludes lakes, ponds, glaciers > 1 km^{2} (0.386 sq mi or 247 acres) and river estuaries.

Mausoléo (French pronunciation: [mozɔleo]; Corsican: U Musuleu, Mausuleu; Italian: Mausoleo, [mawzoˈlɛo]) is a commune in the French department of Haute-Corse, island of Corsica.

== Population ==
Historical population
Year	Pop.	±% p.a.
1968	67	—
1975	49	−4.37%
1982	38	−3.57%
1990	14	−11.73%
1999	11	−2.64%
2007	13	+2.11%
2012	17	+5.51%
2017	17	+0.00%
2023	24	+5.92%
Source: INSEE

== See also ==
- Communes of the Haute-Corse department
