= Costa, Haute-Corse =

Costa
- Commune
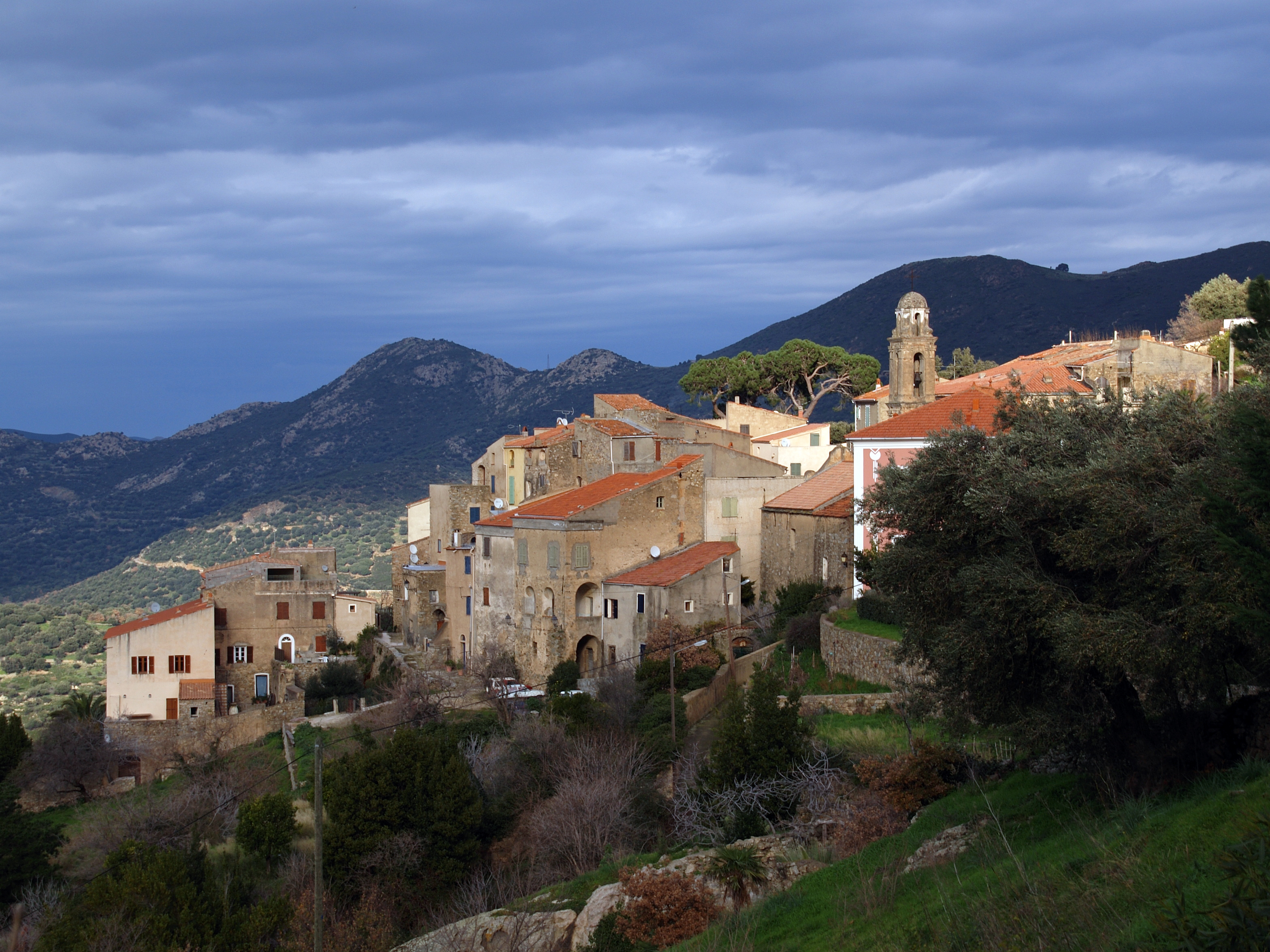
- The village of Costa

- Coat of arms
- Location of Costa
- Location within France Location within Corsica
- Coordinates: 42°34′34″N 9°00′08″E
- Country: France
- Region: Corsica
- Department: Haute-Corse
- Arrondissement: Calvi
- Canton: L'Île-Rousse

Government
  - Mayor (2020–2026): Barthelemy Colombani
- Area^{1}: 1.09 km^{2} (0.42 sq mi)
- Elevation: 350 m (1,150 ft)
- Highest elevation: 604 m (1,982 ft)
- Lowest elevation: 160 m (520 ft)
- Population (2023): 49
  - Density: 45/km^{2} (120/sq mi)
- Time zone: UTC+01:00 (CET)
  - Summer (DST): UTC+02:00 (CEST)
- INSEE/Postal code: 2B097 /20226
- ^{1} French Land Register data, which excludes lakes, ponds, glaciers > 1 km^{2} (0.386 sq mi or 247 acres) and river estuaries.

Costa (French pronunciation: [kɔsta]; Corsican: A Costa) is a commune in the Haute-Corse department of France on the island of Corsica.

It is in the north of the island, about 5 km south east of Belgodère, just off the D71 corniche. The commune is built on the site of the medieval parish of Tuani.

== Population ==
Historical population
Year	Pop.	±% p.a.
1968	90	—
1975	73	−2.95%
1982	69	−0.80%
1990	46	−4.94%
1999	48	+0.47%
2007	60	+2.83%
2012	70	+3.13%
2017	62	−2.40%
2023	49	−3.85%
Source: INSEE

== See also ==
- Communes of the Haute-Corse department
