= Pigna, Haute-Corse =

Pigna
- Commune
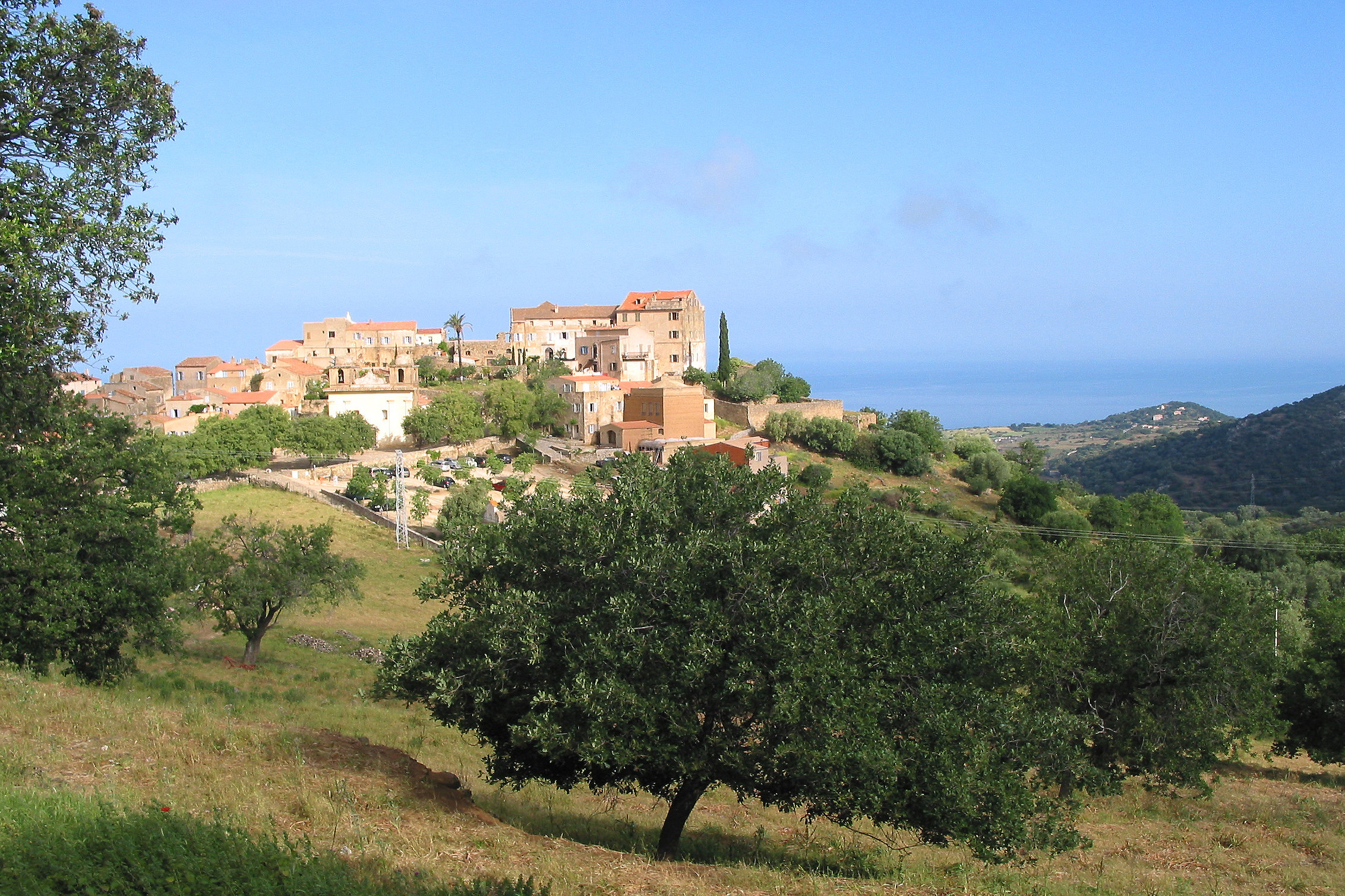
- The village of Pigna
- Location of Pigna
- Location within France Location within Corsica
- Coordinates: 42°36′01″N 8°54′10″E
- Country: France
- Region: Corsica
- Department: Haute-Corse
- Arrondissement: Calvi
- Canton: L'Île-Rousse

Government
  - Mayor (2023–2026): Jérôme Casalonga
- Area^{1}: 2.21 km^{2} (0.85 sq mi)
- Elevation: 230 m (750 ft)
- Highest elevation: 521 m (1,709 ft)
- Lowest elevation: 15 m (49 ft)
- Population (2023): 128
  - Density: 57.9/km^{2} (150/sq mi)
- Time zone: UTC+01:00 (CET)
  - Summer (DST): UTC+02:00 (CEST)
- INSEE/Postal code: 2B231 /20220
- ^{1} French Land Register data, which excludes lakes, ponds, glaciers > 1 km^{2} (0.386 sq mi or 247 acres) and river estuaries.

Pigna (French pronunciation: [piɲa]) is a commune in the Haute-Corse department of France on the island of Corsica.

== Population ==
Historical population
Year	Pop.	±% p.a.
1968	60	—
1975	101	+7.72%
1982	110	+1.23%
1990	92	−2.21%
1999	95	+0.36%
2007	97	+0.26%
2012	100	+0.61%
2017	95	−1.02%
2023	128	+5.09%
Source: INSEE

== See also ==
- Communes of the Haute-Corse department
