= Nessa, Haute-Corse =

Nessa
- Commune
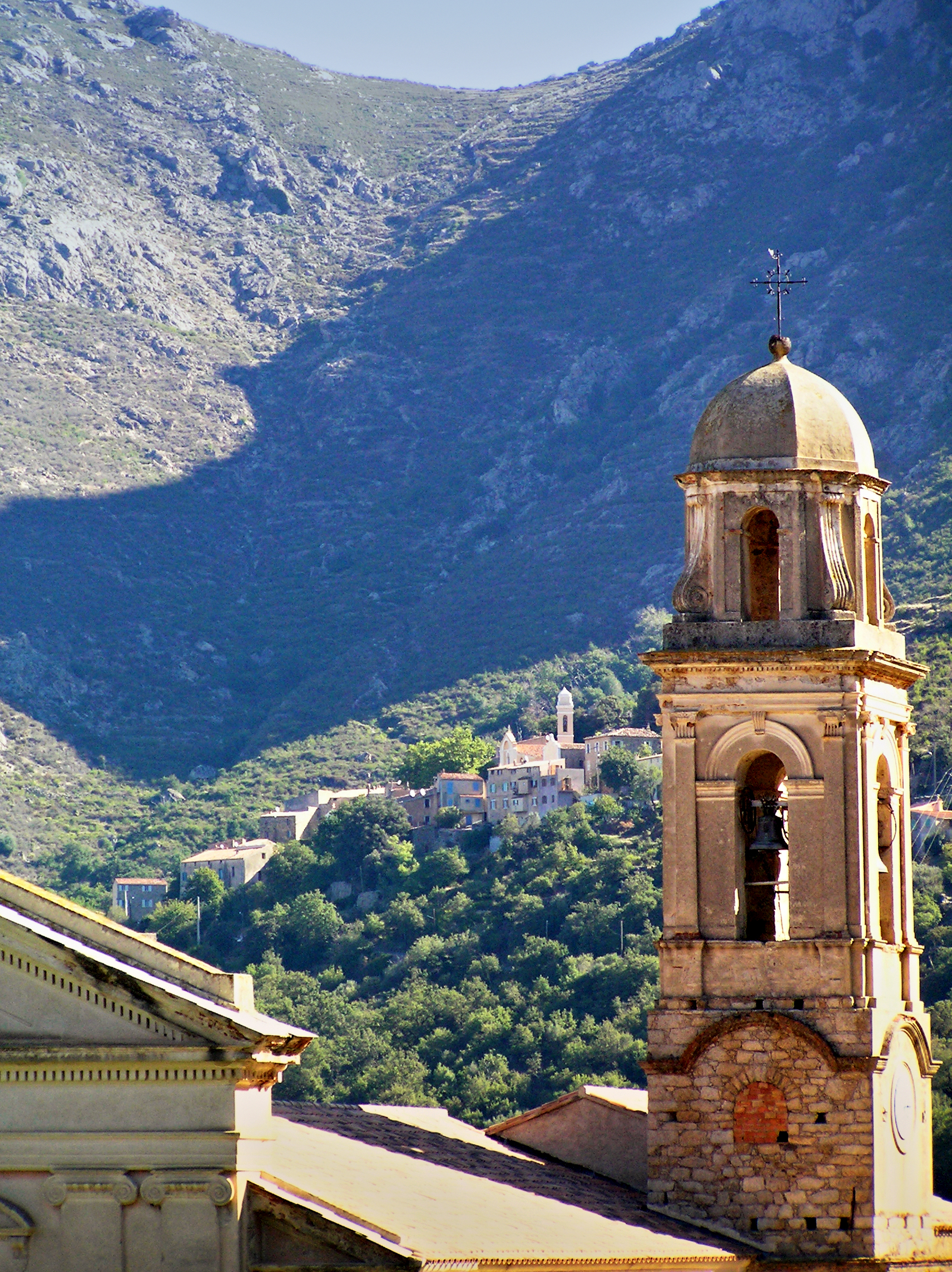
- A view of the village, from the church in Feliceto
- Location of Nessa
- Location within France Location within Corsica
- Coordinates: 42°33′01″N 8°56′54″E
- Country: France
- Region: Corsica
- Department: Haute-Corse
- Arrondissement: Calvi
- Canton: L'Île-Rousse

Government
  - Mayor (2020–2026): Jean-Michel Pinaud
- Area^{1}: 5.86 km^{2} (2.26 sq mi)
- Elevation: 350 m (1,150 ft)
- Highest elevation: 1,331 m (4,367 ft)
- Lowest elevation: 258 m (846 ft)
- Population (2023): 122
  - Density: 20.8/km^{2} (53.9/sq mi)
- Time zone: UTC+01:00 (CET)
  - Summer (DST): UTC+02:00 (CEST)
- INSEE/Postal code: 2B175 /20225
- ^{1} French Land Register data, which excludes lakes, ponds, glaciers > 1 km^{2} (0.386 sq mi or 247 acres) and river estuaries.

Nessa is a commune in the Haute-Corse department of France on the island of Corsica.

== Population ==
Historical population
Year	Pop.	±% p.a.
1968	97	—
1975	98	+0.15%
1982	100	+0.29%
1990	91	−1.17%
1999	77	−1.84%
2007	106	+4.08%
2012	108	+0.37%
2017	109	+0.18%
2023	122	+1.90%
Source: INSEE

== See also ==
- Communes of the Haute-Corse department
