= Santa-Reparata-di-Balagna =

- Commune
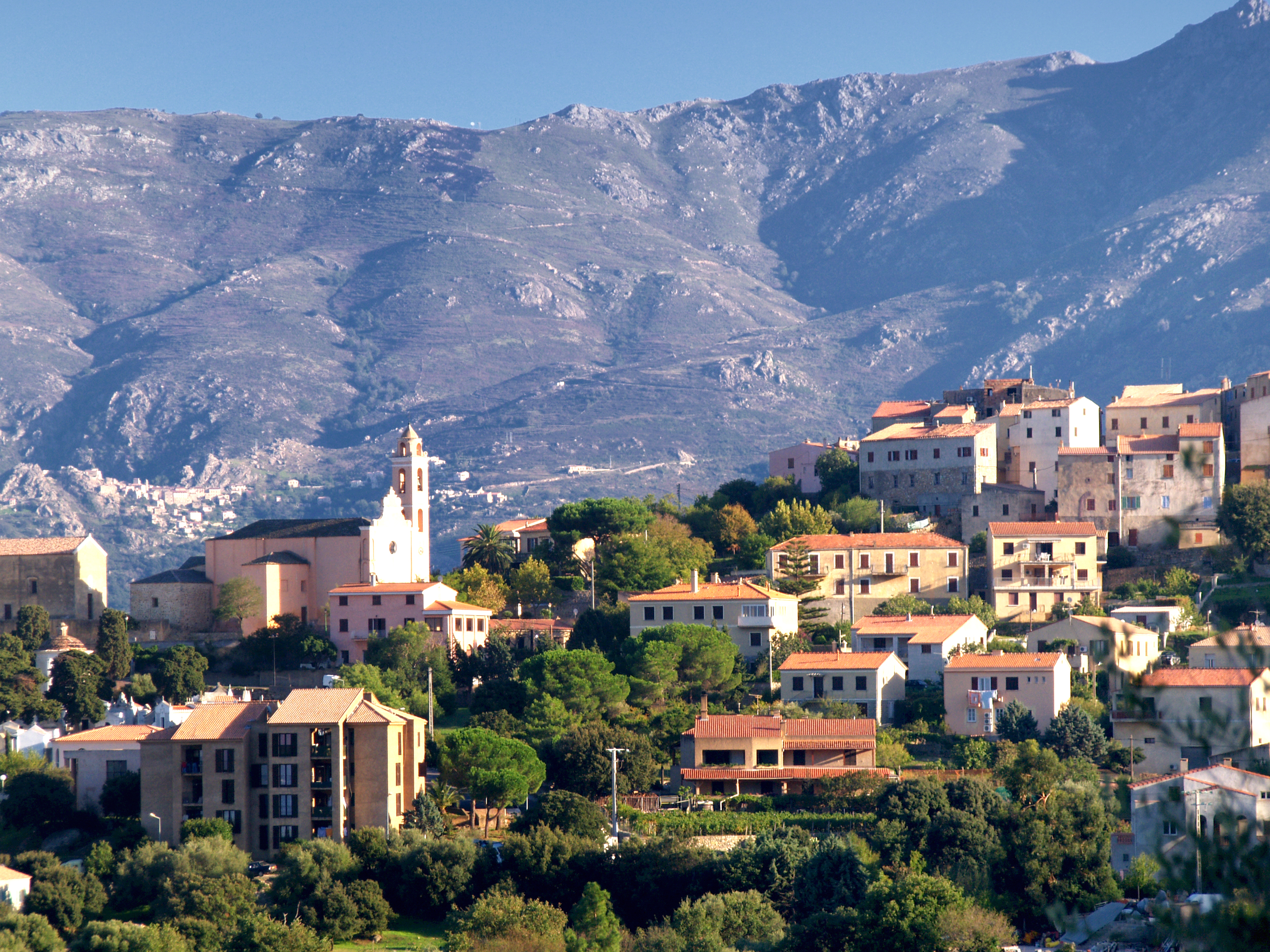
- A general view of Santa-Reparata-di-Balagna
- Location of Santa-Reparata-di-Balagna
- Location within France Location within Corsica
- Coordinates: 42°36′16″N 8°55′45″E
- Country: France
- Region: Corsica
- Department: Haute-Corse
- Arrondissement: Calvi
- Canton: L'Île-Rousse

Government
  - Mayor (2020–2026): Marcel Torracinta
- Area^{1}: 10.16 km^{2} (3.92 sq mi)
- Elevation: 150 m (490 ft)
- Highest elevation: 561 m (1,841 ft)
- Lowest elevation: 35 m (115 ft)
- Population (2023): 1,024
  - Density: 100.8/km^{2} (261.0/sq mi)
- Time zone: UTC+01:00 (CET)
  - Summer (DST): UTC+02:00 (CEST)
- INSEE/Postal code: 2B316 /20220
- ^{1} French Land Register data, which excludes lakes, ponds, glaciers > 1 km^{2} (0.386 sq mi or 247 acres) and river estuaries.

Santa-Reparata-di-Balagna is a commune in the Haute-Corse department of France on the island of Corsica.

== Population ==
Historical population
Year	Pop.	±% p.a.
1968	477	—
1975	539	+1.76%
1982	643	+2.55%
1990	784	+2.51%
1999	838	+0.74%
2007	953	+1.62%
2012	1,007	+1.11%
2017	1,012	+0.10%
2023	1,024	+0.20%
Source: INSEE

== See also ==
- Communes of the Haute-Corse department
