= Muro, Haute-Corse =

Muro Muru
- Commune
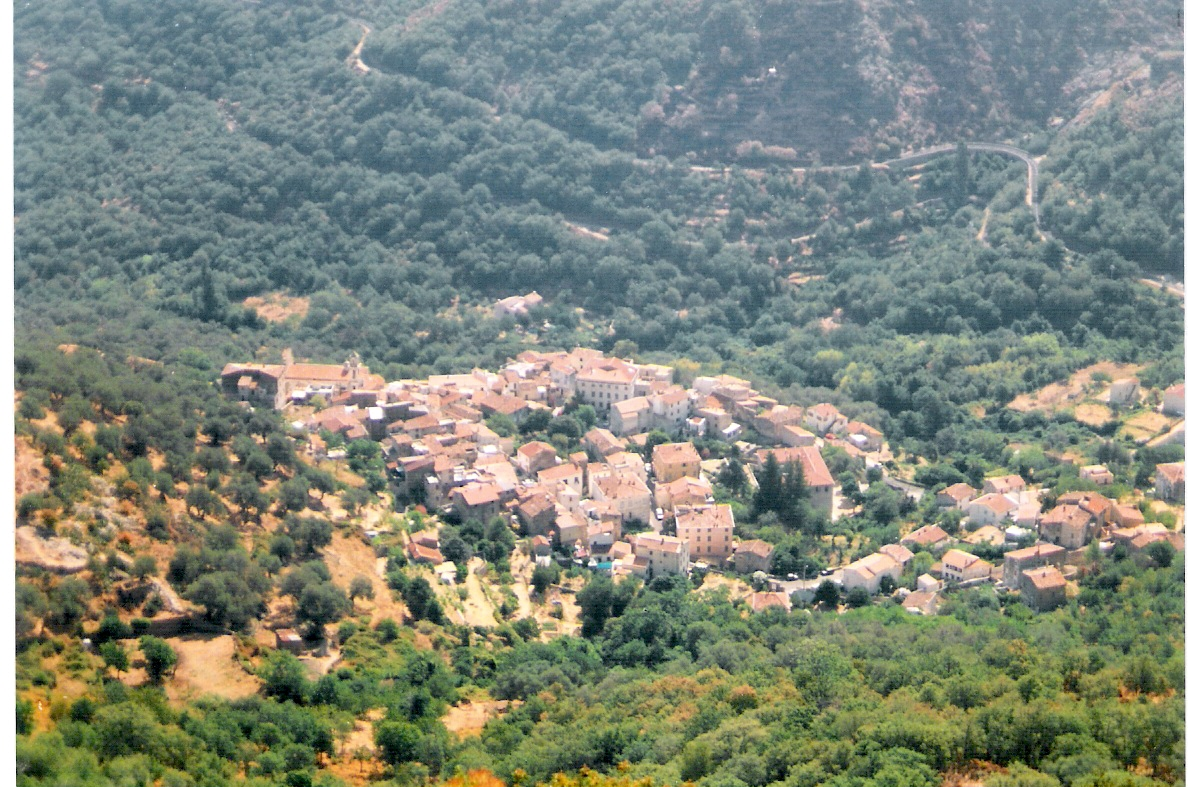
- The village of Muro, seen from the nearby hillside

- Coat of arms
- Location of Muro
- Location within France Location within Corsica
- Coordinates: 42°32′47″N 8°54′54″E
- Country: France
- Region: Corsica
- Department: Haute-Corse
- Arrondissement: Calvi
- Canton: L'Île-Rousse

Government
  - Mayor (2020–2026): Jean-Baptiste Moretti
- Area^{1}: 7.92 km^{2} (3.06 sq mi)
- Elevation: 320 m (1,050 ft)
- Highest elevation: 1,360 m (4,460 ft)
- Lowest elevation: 160 m (520 ft)
- Population (2023): 243
  - Density: 30.7/km^{2} (79.5/sq mi)
- Time zone: UTC+01:00 (CET)
  - Summer (DST): UTC+02:00 (CEST)
- INSEE/Postal code: 2B173 /20225
- ^{1} French Land Register data, which excludes lakes, ponds, glaciers > 1 km^{2} (0.386 sq mi or 247 acres) and river estuaries.

Muro is a commune in the Haute-Corse department of France on the island of Corsica.

== Population ==
Historical population
Year	Pop.	±% p.a.
1968	400	—
1975	323	−3.01%
1982	283	−1.87%
1990	276	−0.31%
1999	248	−1.18%
2007	263	+0.74%
2012	235	−2.23%
2017	238	+0.25%
2023	243	+0.35%
Source: INSEE

== See also ==
- Communes of the Haute-Corse department
