= Sant'Antonino, Haute-Corse =

Sant'Antonino
- Commune
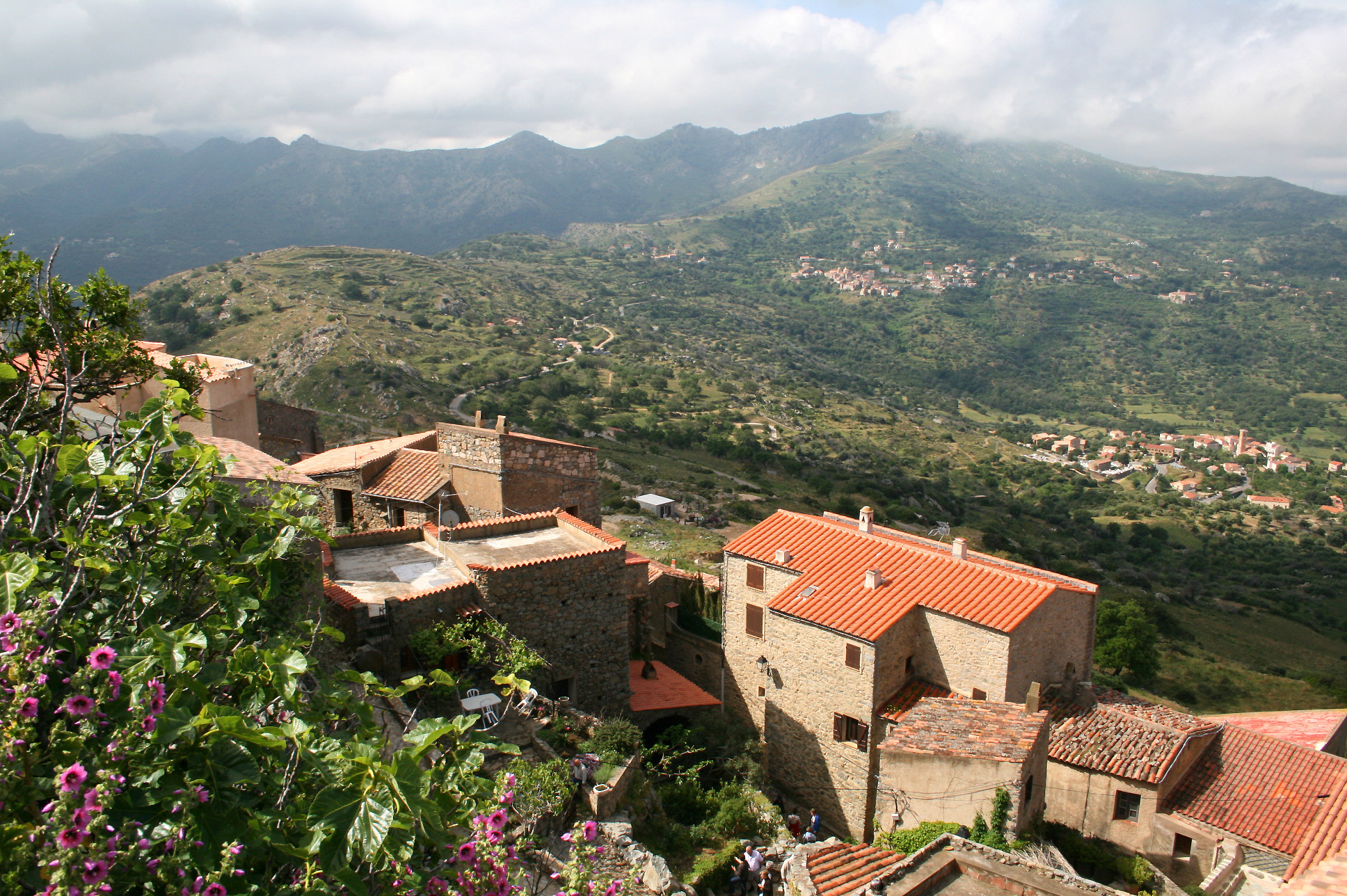
- Sant'Antonino, and the villages of the Balagne
- Location of Sant'Antonino
- Location within France Location within Corsica
- Coordinates: 42°35′24″N 8°54′20″E
- Country: France
- Region: Corsica
- Department: Haute-Corse
- Arrondissement: Calvi
- Canton: Calvi
- Intercommunality: Calvi Balagne

Government
  - Mayor (2020–2026): Roxane Barthelemy
- Area^{1}: 4.1 km^{2} (1.6 sq mi)
- Elevation: 497 m (1,631 ft)
- Highest elevation: 521 m (1,709 ft)
- Lowest elevation: 138 m (453 ft)
- Population (2023): 127
  - Density: 31/km^{2} (80/sq mi)
- Time zone: UTC+01:00 (CET)
  - Summer (DST): UTC+02:00 (CEST)
- INSEE/Postal code: 2B296 /20220
- ^{1} French Land Register data, which excludes lakes, ponds, glaciers > 1 km^{2} (0.386 sq mi or 247 acres) and river estuaries.

Sant'Antonino (French pronunciation: [sɑ̃t‿ɑ̃tɔnino]) is a commune in the Haute-Corse department of France on the island of Corsica. It is one of Les Plus Beaux Villages de France.

== Population ==
Historical population
Year	Pop.	±% p.a.
1968	121	—
1975	113	−0.97%
1982	79	−4.98%
1990	60	−3.38%
1999	77	+2.81%
2007	91	+2.11%
2012	107	+3.29%
2017	127	+3.49%
2023	127	+0.00%
Source: INSEE

== See also ==
- Communes of the Haute-Corse department
