= Speloncato =

- Commune
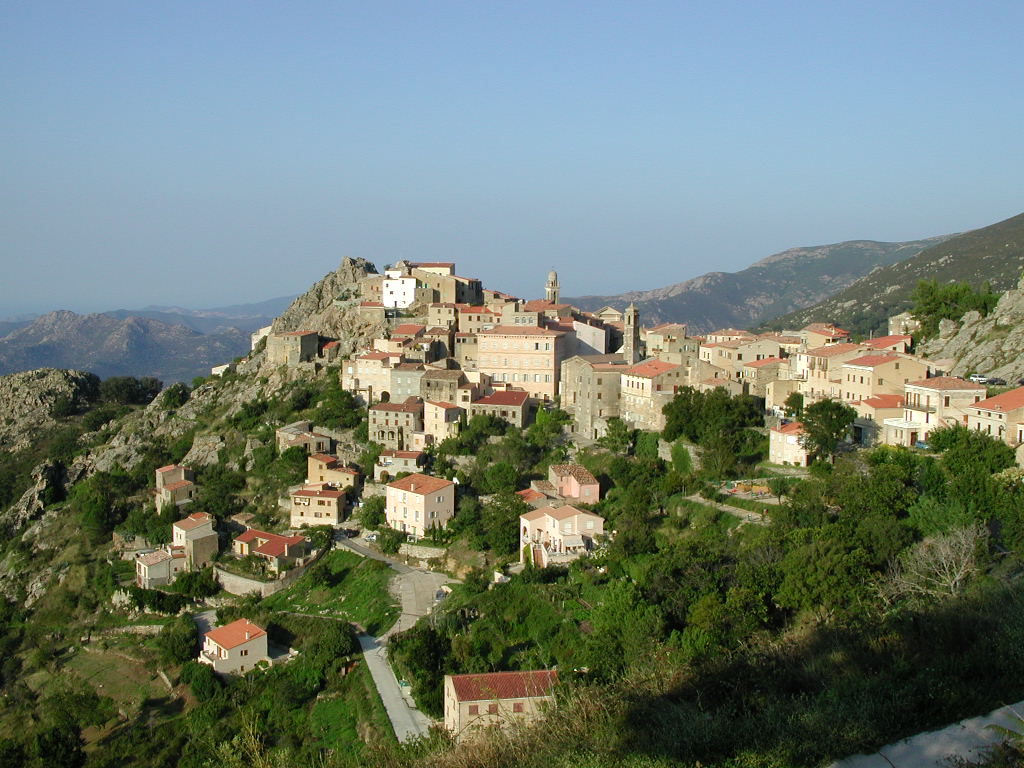
- A view of the village from the D663 road from Nessa
- Location of Speloncato
- Location within France Location within Corsica
- Coordinates: 42°33′46″N 8°58′54″E
- Country: France
- Region: Corsica
- Department: Haute-Corse
- Arrondissement: Calvi
- Canton: L'Île-Rousse

Government
  - Mayor (2020–2026): Jean-François Poli
- Area^{1}: 17.67 km^{2} (6.82 sq mi)
- Elevation: 600 m (2,000 ft)
- Highest elevation: 1,331 m (4,367 ft)
- Lowest elevation: 49 m (161 ft)
- Population (2023): 261
  - Density: 14.8/km^{2} (38.3/sq mi)
- Time zone: UTC+01:00 (CET)
  - Summer (DST): UTC+02:00 (CEST)
- INSEE/Postal code: 2B290 /20226
- ^{1} French Land Register data, which excludes lakes, ponds, glaciers > 1 km^{2} (0.386 sq mi or 247 acres) and river estuaries.

Speloncato is a commune in the Haute-Corse department of France on the island of Corsica.

== Population ==
Historical population
Year	Pop.	±% p.a.
1968	150	—
1975	179	+2.56%
1982	191	+0.93%
1990	194	+0.19%
1999	222	+1.51%
2007	269	+2.43%
2012	285	+1.16%
2017	276	−0.64%
2023	261	−0.93%
Source: INSEE

== See also ==
- Communes of the Haute-Corse department
