= San Parteo =

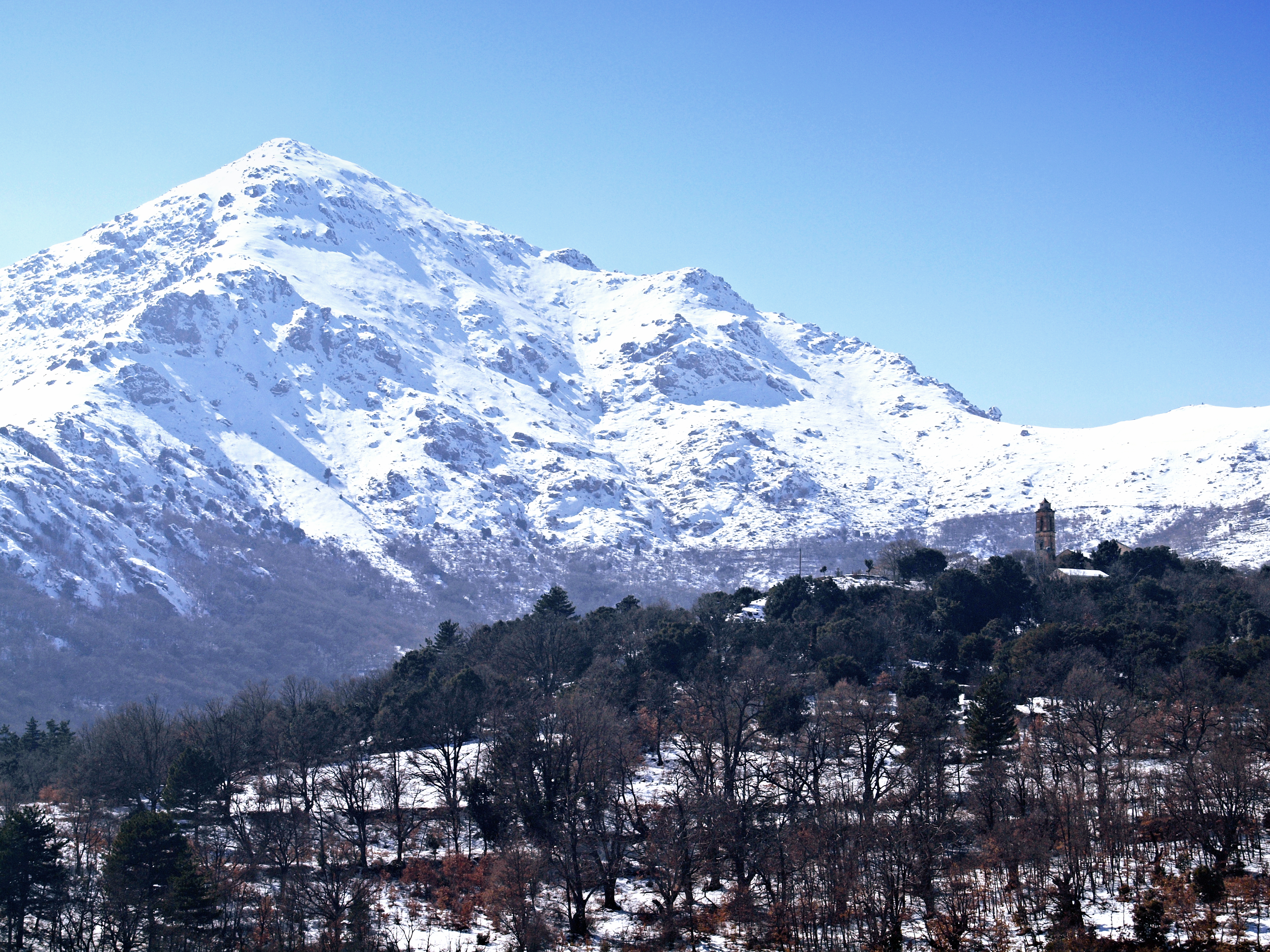

Highest point
- Elevation: 1,680 m (5,510 ft)
- Coordinates: 42°31′10″N 8°57′51″E

Geography
- Location within Corsica
- Location: Monticello, Haute-Corse, Corsica

Monte San Parteo (Corsican: San Parteu) is a mountain peak located in Monticello, Haute-Corse, Corsica. Situated between the River Melaja Tartagine and the Fiume di Regino valleys, the mountain rises to 1,680 metres (5,510 ft). It is part of the Monte Cinto Massif.

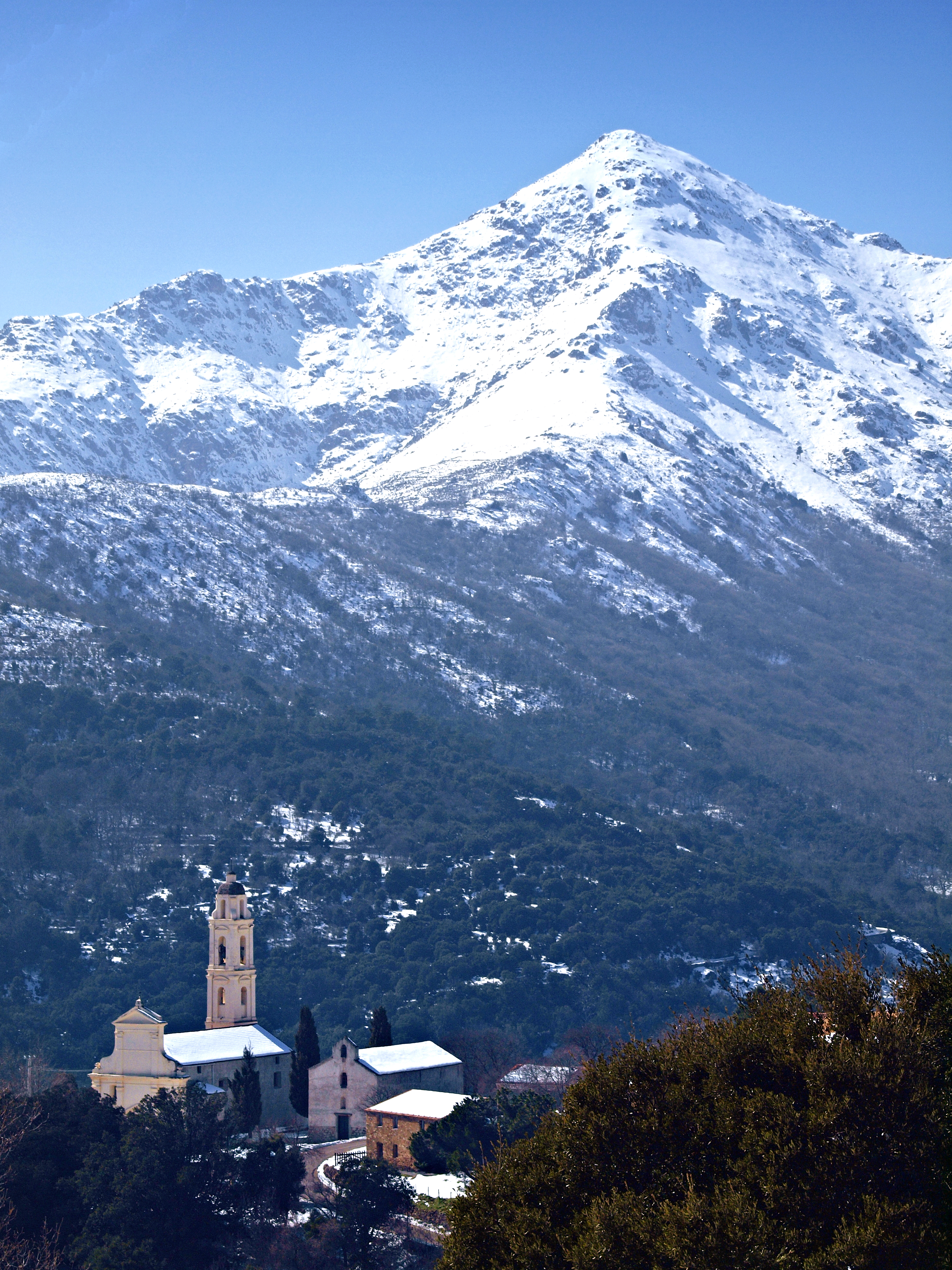
San Pateo from Olmi-Cappella

San Parteo straddles the communes of Pioggiola and Feliceto. It is part of a mountain range that marks both the entire northwestern part of the Regional Natural Park of Corsica and the western part of Giunssani. This chain includes some remarkable peaks, mainly Capu Ladroncellu (2145 m), Monte Corona (2144 meters), the Capu a u Dente (2025 meters), Punta Radich (2012 m), Monte Grosso (1937 meters) and San Parteo, and forms a large part of the casket of Giunssani.

Until 1935, an Easter Monday procession took place in a chapel, now in ruins, situated at 1,600 m (5,200 ft) altitude in the San Parteo. The chapel was dedicated to Saint Parthée (San Parteu), a fifth-century saint who was very popular in Giunssani.

Although not the highest mountain of the range, San Parteo is not easily accessible. Some climbers take a path from Feliceto, but this route has become notorious because of large landslides. An unmarked mountain path is used, where you "scale the east flank of the cirque and follows the ridge to the summit, from where you follow the spine of another ridge west to rejoin the waymarked trail to Mausoleo."
