= Giunssani =

Microregion in Corsica

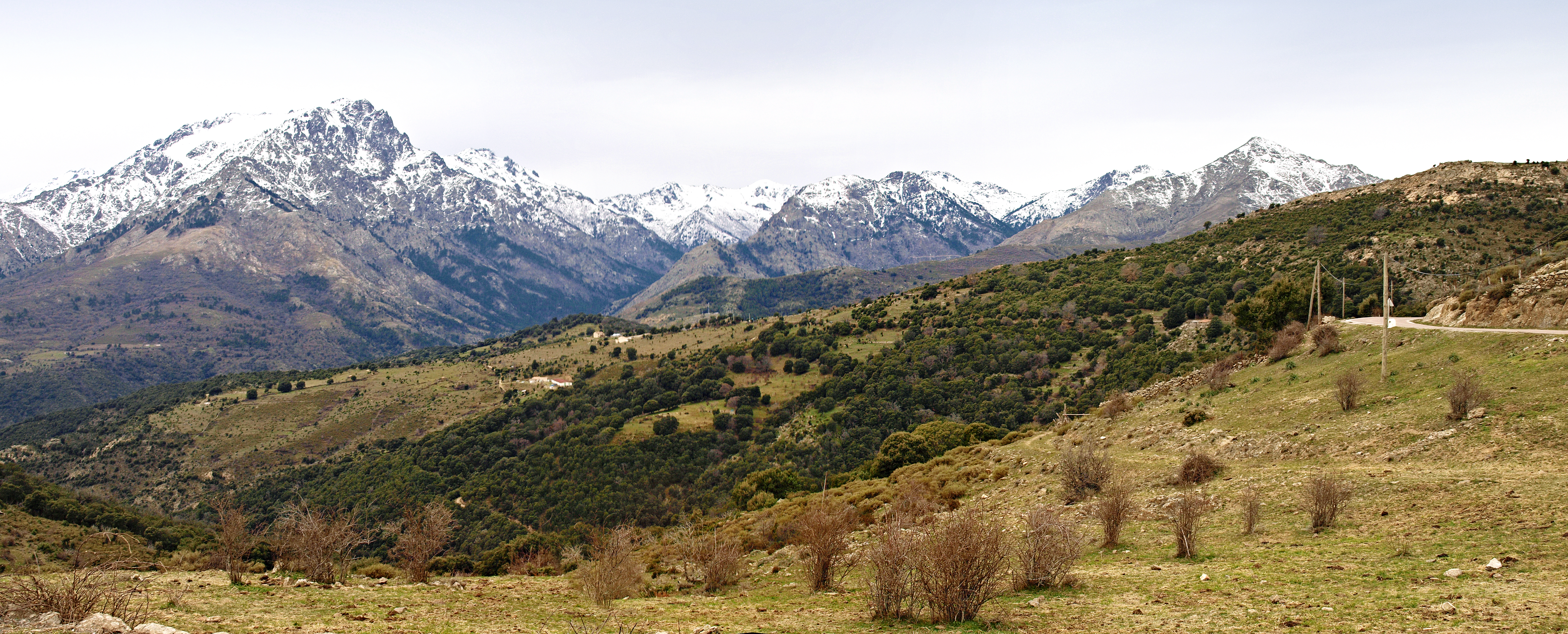
Panorama of Giussani

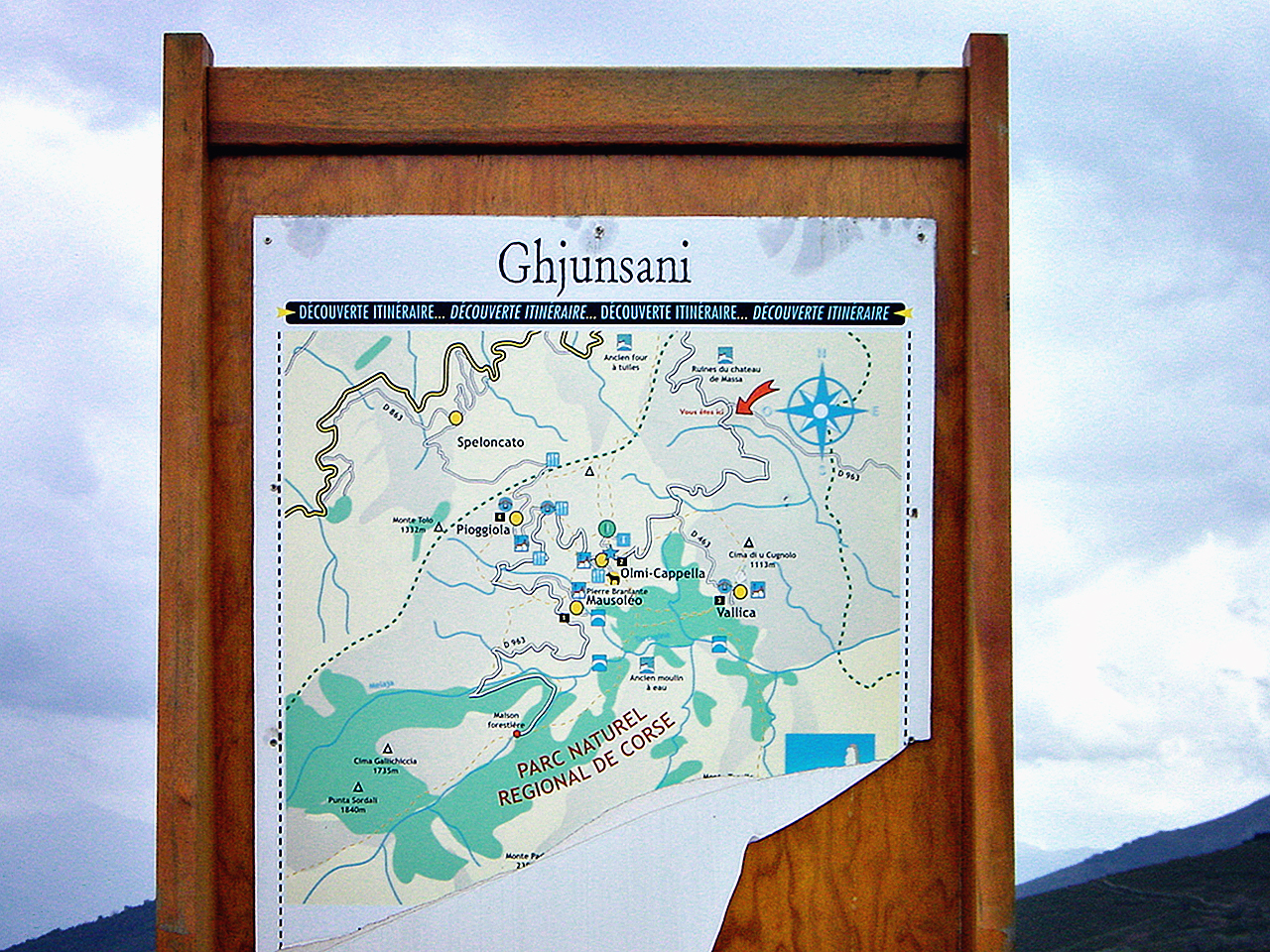
Map of Giussani

Giussani (Ghjunsani in Corsican) is a microregion in the northeast of Corsica, in the department of Haute-Corse. The area is within the Balagne and is isolated between the peaks of Monte Grosso and Monte Padro.

== History ==
Giussani is a micro-region which was inhabited since prior to the Christian era. In the Olmi-Cappella area, there are many ruins of megaliths. Many archaeological items from the early Christian era have been unearthed. The Romans left traces much more visible including a Roman bridge.

The Pieve of Jussani, whose chief town was Mausoléo, contained seven communities in the 14th century: Mausoleo, Forcili, Pioggiola, Capella, Olmi, Lecciole and Vallica. By decree of a Convention on 1 July 1793, the area was renamed Padro and became a part of the department of Golo. By decree of 18 April 1811, Napoleon first merged the departments of Golo and Liamone. The canton of Padro became one of Olmi-Capella. Today, the Giussani villages are all part of the canton of Belgodère.

The Giussani was one of the most populous in the Balagne area, as evidenced by still some vestiges and buildings. An example is the presence of Olmi-Cappella a large building called the "Establishment Battaglini" and which was the first college in Balagne.

The territorial forest of Tartagine (Forêt de Tartagine-Melaja), covered with pine and Corsican pine, is one of the wildest forests in Corsica and was partially destroyed by a great fire in September 2003, affecting some 1800 hectares.

== Economy ==
In the past, many of the residents of this area made their living as itinerant traders. Olive oil and leather products, especially shoes, were top-selling items on the island.

== Gallery ==
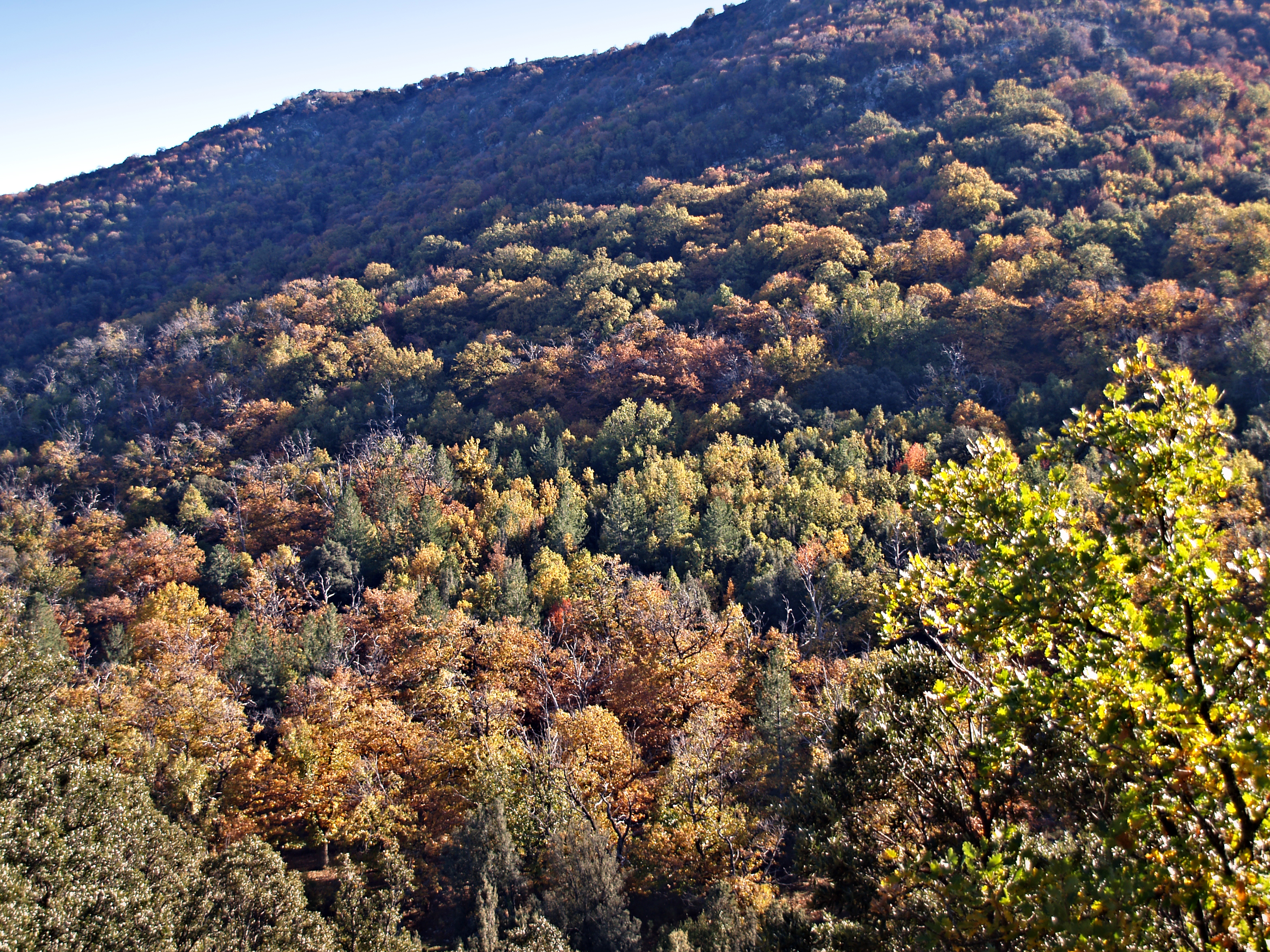
Forêt Tartagine-Melaja

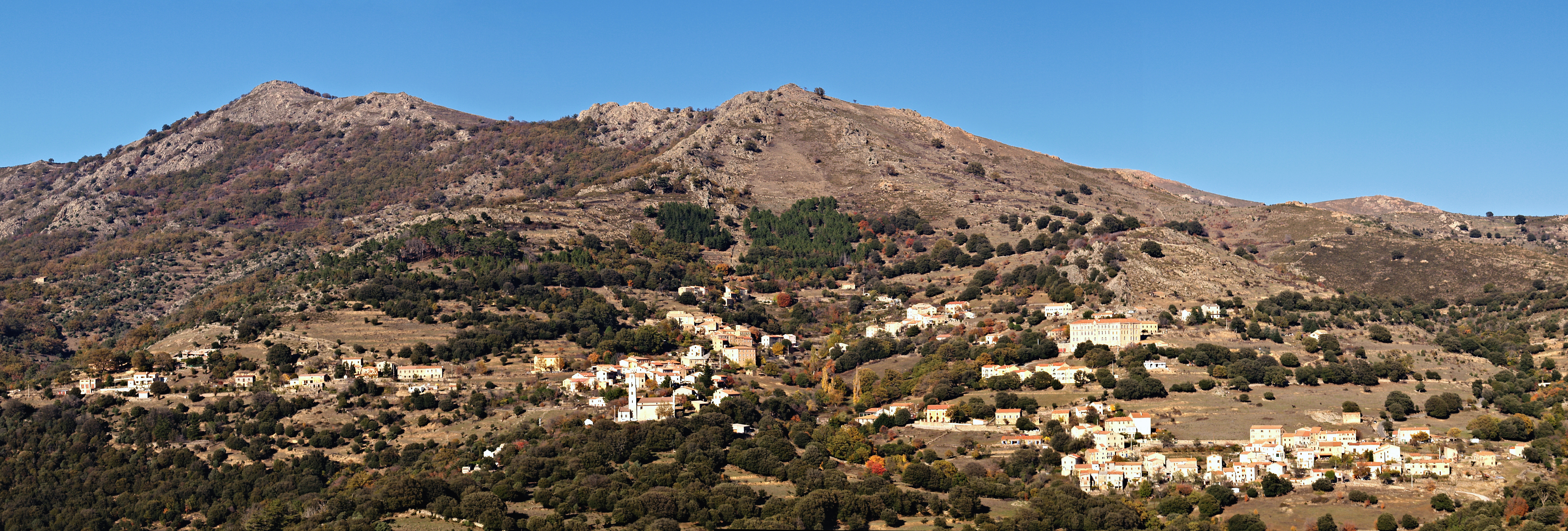
Panorama of Olmi-Cappella

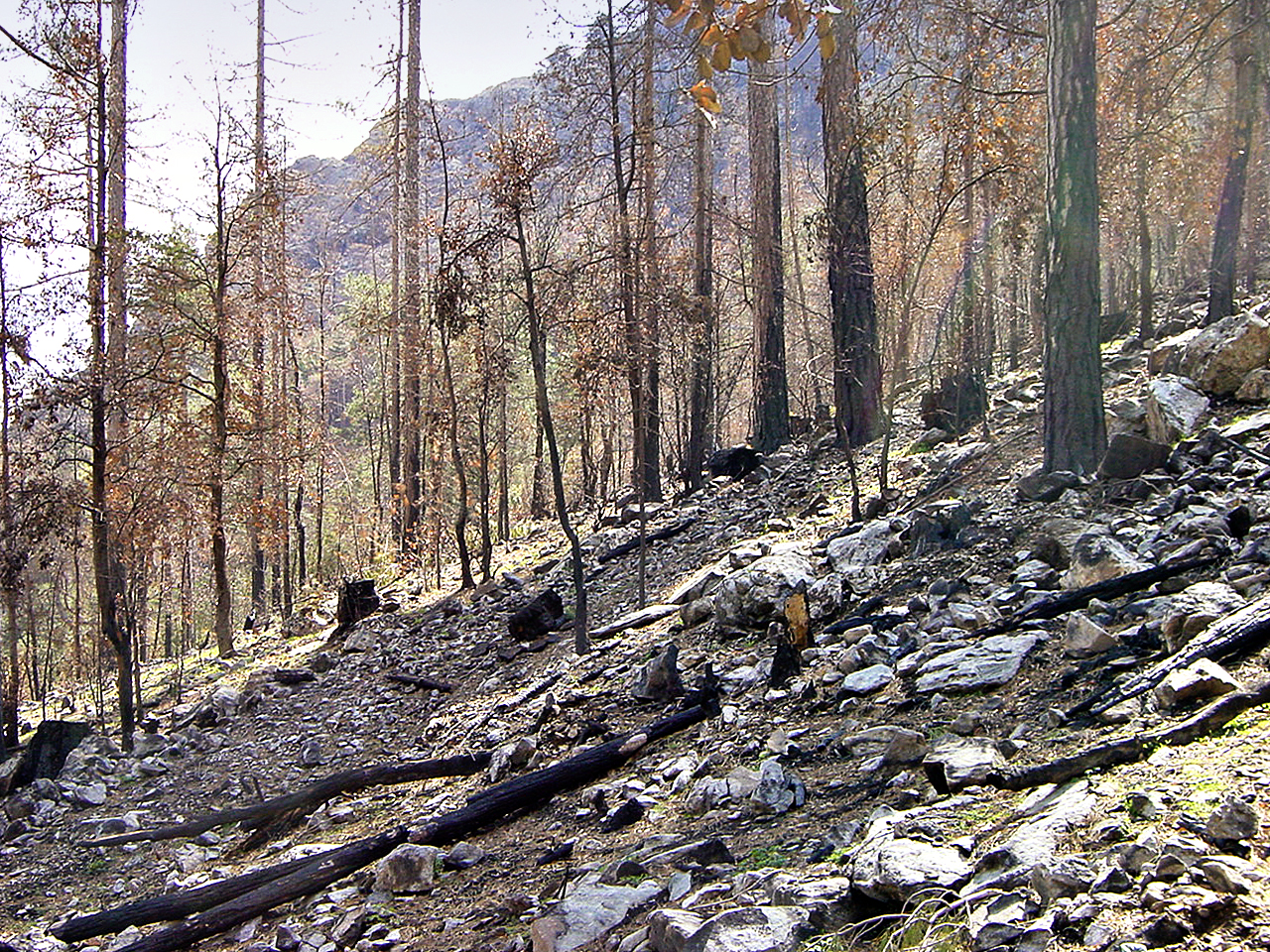
Forêt Tartagine-Melaja after fire in 2003

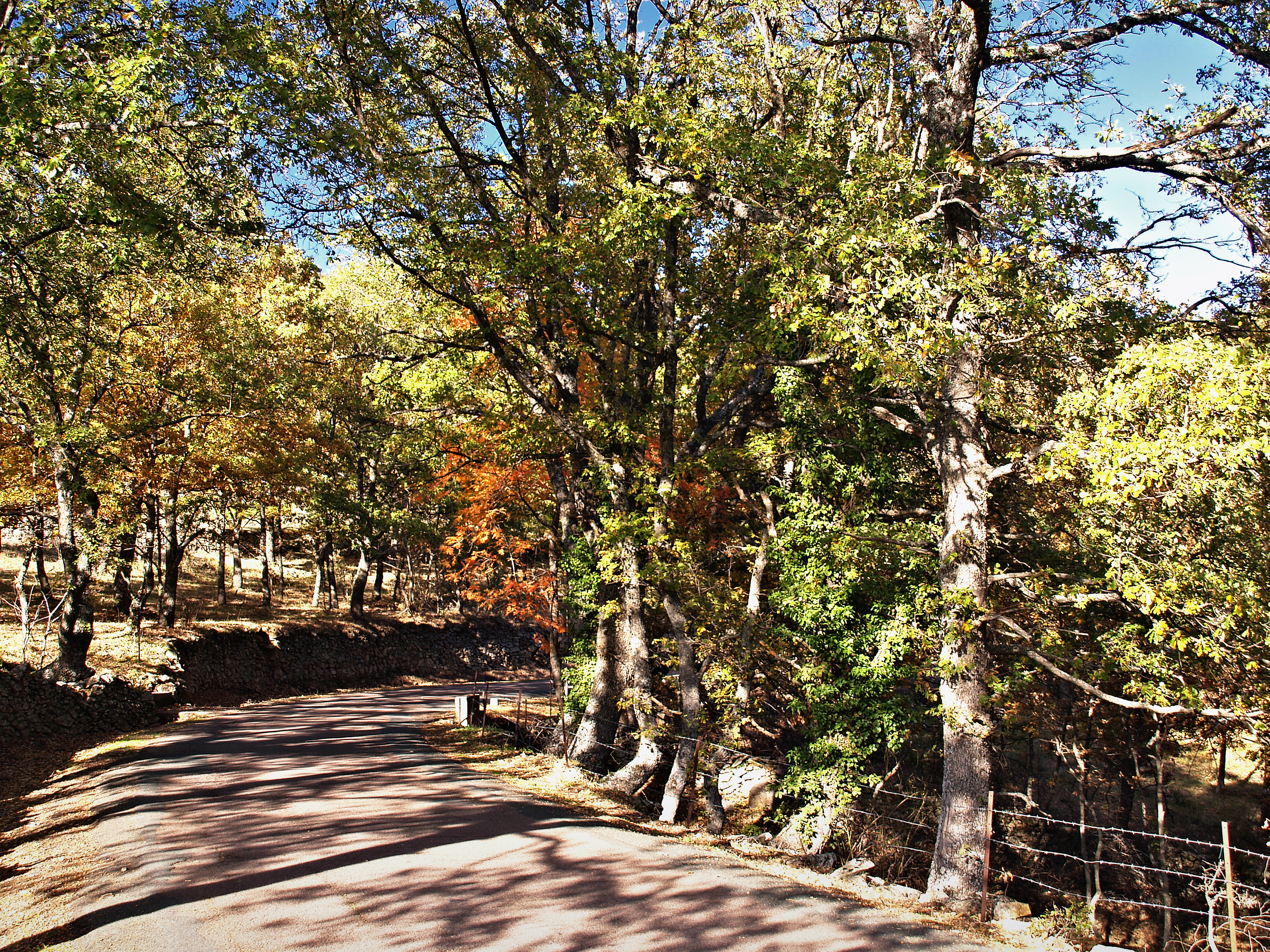
South of Olmi-Cappella
