= Feliceto =

- Commune
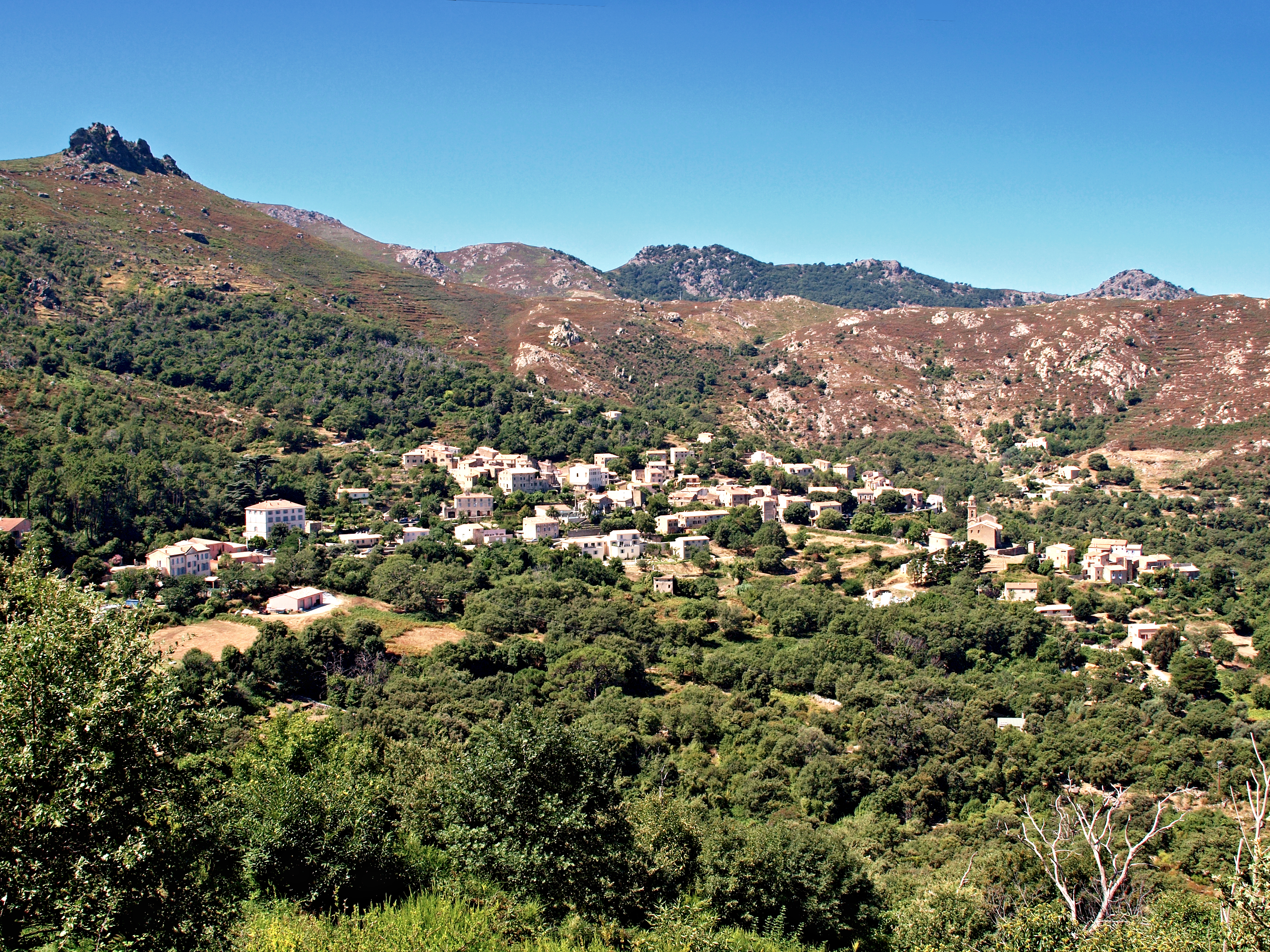
- A general view of Feliceto
- Location of Feliceto
- Location within France Location within Corsica
- Coordinates: 42°32′40″N 8°56′09″E
- Country: France
- Region: Corsica
- Department: Haute-Corse
- Arrondissement: Calvi
- Canton: L'Île-Rousse

Government
  - Mayor (2020–2026): Gérard Francisci
- Area^{1}: 15.25 km^{2} (5.89 sq mi)
- Elevation: 300 m (980 ft)
- Highest elevation: 1,680 m (5,510 ft)
- Lowest elevation: 105 m (344 ft)
- Population (2023): 232
  - Density: 15.2/km^{2} (39.4/sq mi)
- Time zone: UTC+01:00 (CET)
  - Summer (DST): UTC+02:00 (CEST)
- INSEE/Postal code: 2B112 /20225
- ^{1} French Land Register data, which excludes lakes, ponds, glaciers > 1 km^{2} (0.386 sq mi or 247 acres) and river estuaries.

Feliceto (French pronunciation: [felitʃɛto]; Corsican: U Fulgetu) is a commune in the Haute-Corse department of France on the island of Corsica.

== Geography ==
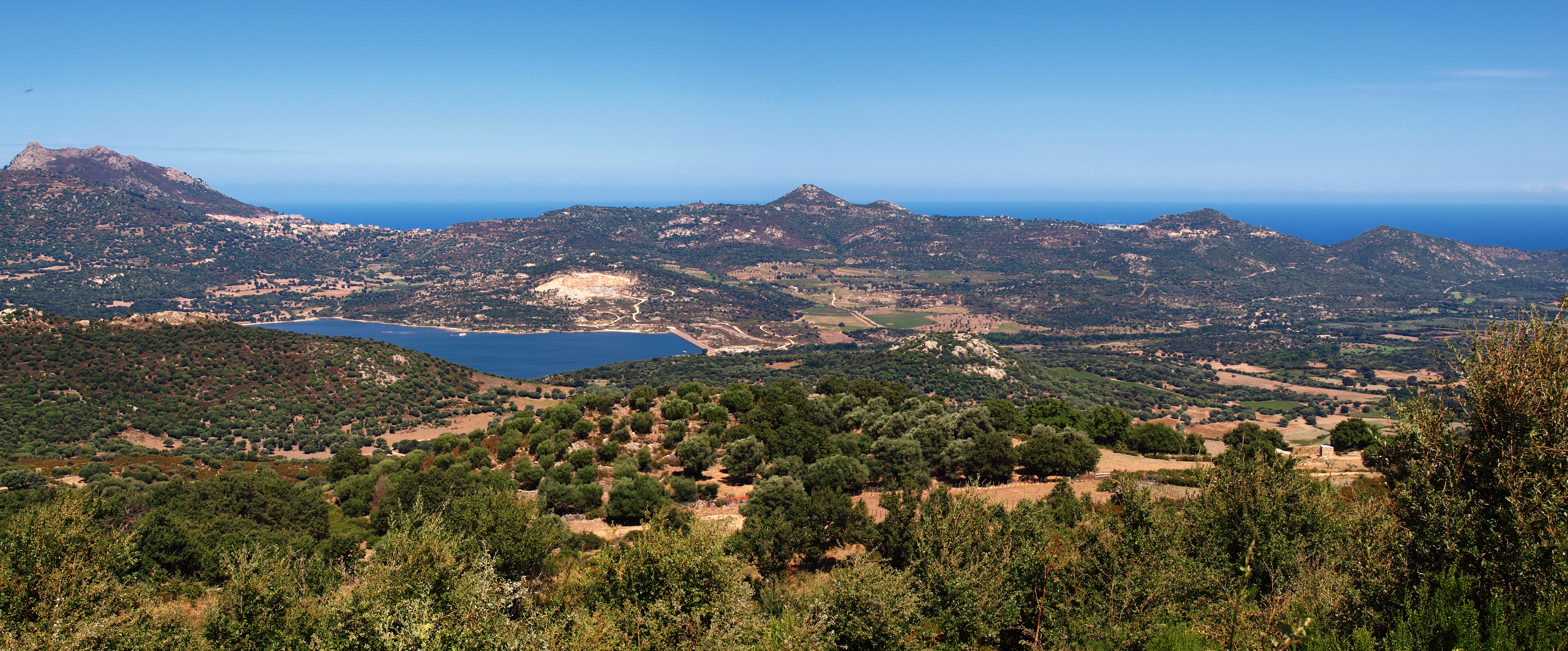
Panorama of the Regino.

=== Location ===
Feliceto is a commune in Balagne, one of the 19 communes that form the Canton of Belgodère. It borders the Corsica Regional Natural Park and has no coastline.

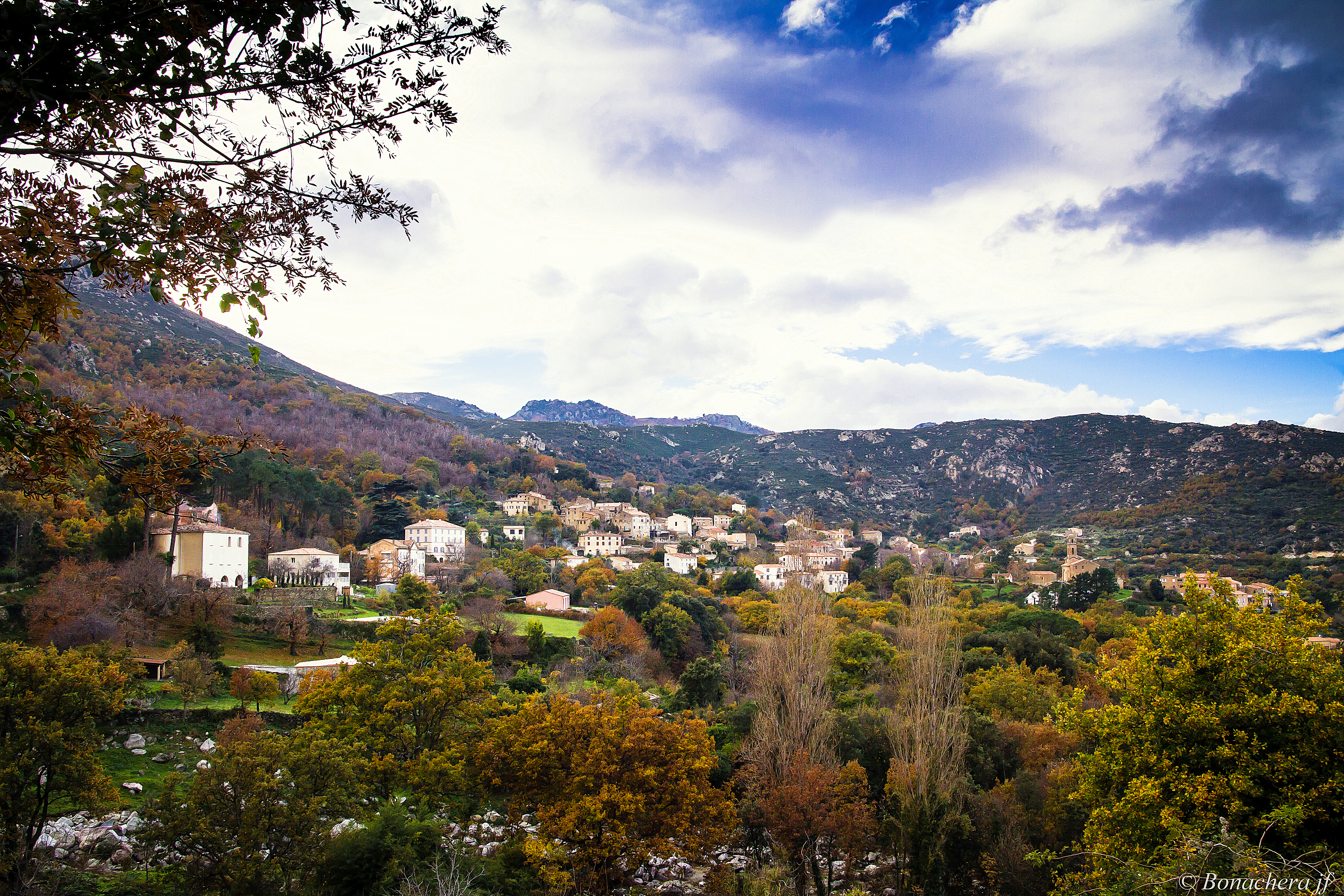
The village of Feliceto seen from Padulella.

=== Terrain ===
Feliceto is located in "crystalline Corsica," composed of magmatic rocks. Its lowland section is part of the Regino basin, which is formed from Quaternary sediments. Like the many "balcony villages" of Regino, the commune is perched on the flank of a secondary ridge that separates the Regino valley from the Calenzana plain, extending to Capu d'Occi (563 metres (1,847 ft)) above Lumio. To the south, it is flanked by the mountain range of the Monte Grosso massif, surrounded by a ridgeline composed of the peaks Monte al Prato (924 metres (3,031 ft)), Capu alla Forcella (1,185 metres (3,888 ft)), Cima di Cuzzia (1,321 metres (4,334 ft)), Cima Caselle (1,622 metres (5,322 ft)), San Parteo (1,680 metres (5,510 ft))—straddling Feliceto and Pioggiola—and Punta di Accenata (1,323 metres (4,341 ft)). It occupies part of the Regino valley with several hills, including Monte Longu (394 metres (1,293 ft)), Capu a i Mori (455 metres (1,493 ft)), Scolca (285 metres (935 ft)), and Capu di Custa (286 metres (938 ft)). The commune is a long strip of land extending north to Lake Codole, "constricted" in the middle by the inhabited area, the village, and its two hamlets. Its southern part is formed by the upper Regino valley.

=== Hydrography ===
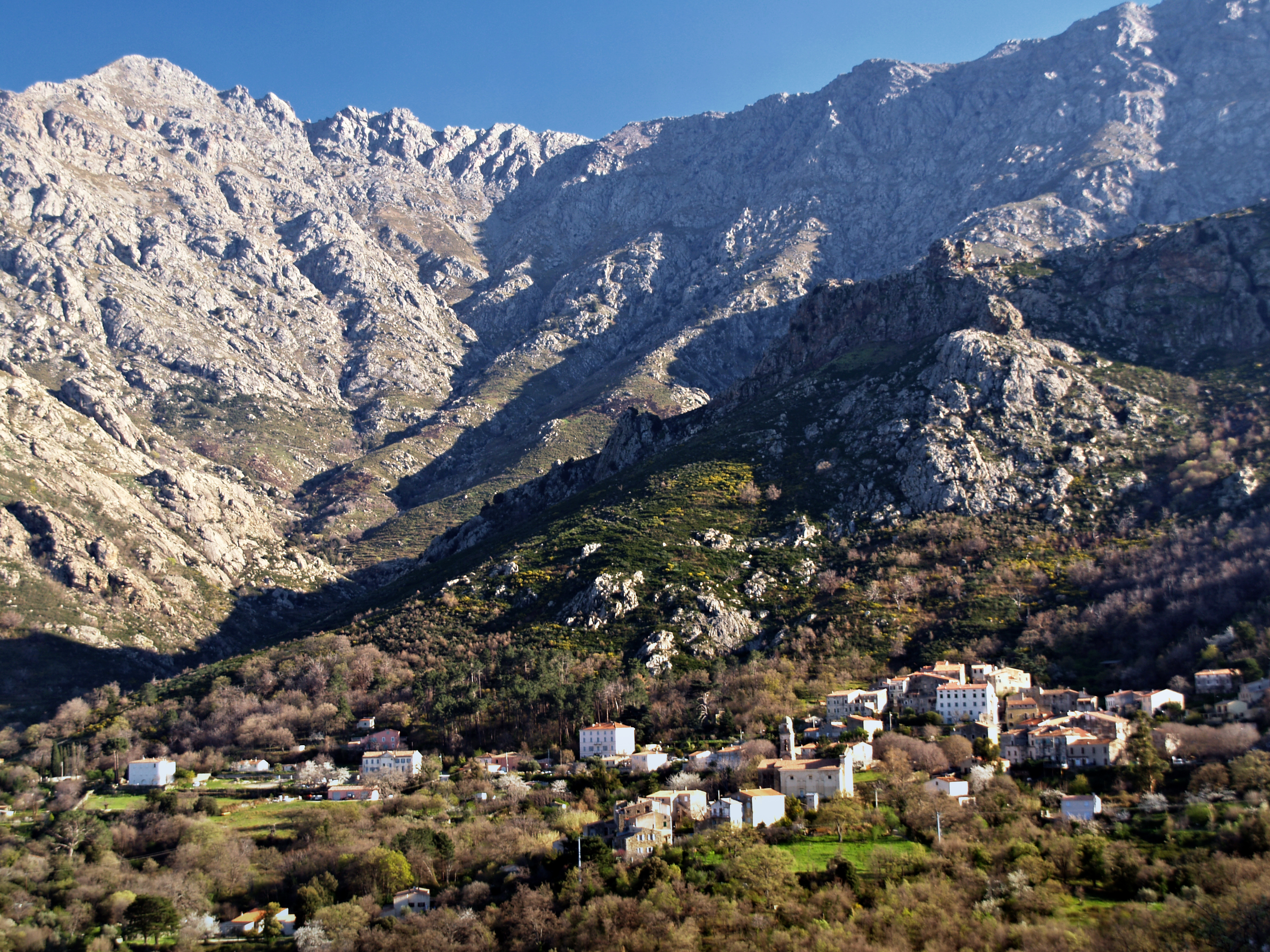
View of the village from the D 13.

The Regino rises within the commune, west and very close to San Parteo (1,680 metres (5,510 ft)), at an altitude of 1,350 metres (4,430 ft). It flows through the village, waters the eponymous plain, and feeds Lake Codole, a reservoir of which Feliceto owns the southern portion.

=== Climate ===
The high mountain range is the source of numerous springs. This "felicity" is where the village draws its name. Four springs are tapped to supply the commune. Below the ridgeline with its bare rocky walls, the setting is verdant, wooded with oak, pine, and chestnut trees on the heights. Olive trees appear from the village down to the Regino plain, where the vineyards of the Renucci and Maestracci estates are located.

As with much of Balagne, Feliceto is exposed to dominant westerly winds, which are strong and frequent, such as the libeccio and the tail-ends of the mistral. However, temperature fluctuations are moderate due to the maritime influence. Summers are dry, and the risk of wildfire is high.

Flooding is another significant natural risk. The commune has experienced several recent disasters:

- October 25–26, 2007: floods and mudslides;
- November 29–30, 2008: floods and mudslides.

== Population ==
Historical population
Year	Pop.	±% p.a.
1968	181	—
1975	160	−1.75%
1982	145	−1.40%
1990	145	+0.00%
1999	162	+1.24%
2007	210	+3.30%
2012	204	−0.58%
2017	225	+1.98%
2023	232	+0.51%
Source: INSEE

== See also ==
- Communes of the Haute-Corse department
