= Col de San Colombano =

Col de San Colombanoa
- Corsican: Bocca di San Colombanu
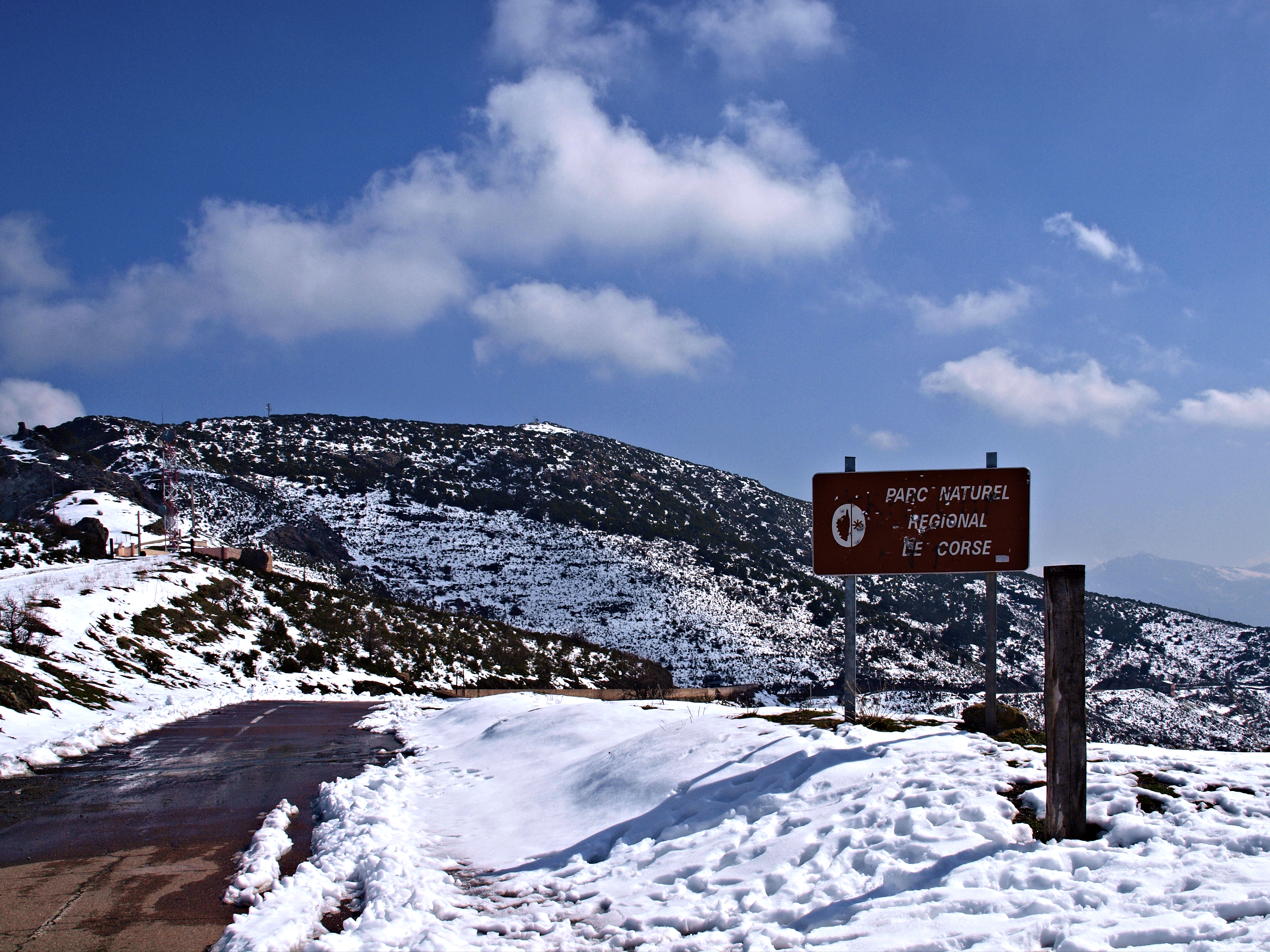
- The pass in March 2010

- Location within Corsica Location within France
- Elevation: 692 metres (2,270 ft)
- Traversed by: T301

Third Approach
- Location: Haute-Corse, Corsica, France
- Coordinates: 42°34′46″N 9°04′12″E

Col de San Colombano (Corsican: Bocca di San Colombanu) is a mountain pass in Corsica.

== Location ==
The Col de San Colombano is in the north of the Monte Cinto Massif. It separates the 821 metres (2,694 ft) Cima di l'Alturaia to the east from the 794 metres (2,605 ft) Bocca di u Prunu to the west The crest of the pass is at 692 metres (2,270 ft). It leads from the valley of the Ostriconi river to the east to the valley of the Fiume di Regino to the west. The T301 road leads through the pass. The crest is on the boundary between the communes of Palasca to the north and Olmi-Cappella to the south.

== History ==
The pass has long been an important military importance, as shown by the ruins of the Castello de San Colombano de Giussani above the pass. This castle was first mentioned in 1289, and was the main fortress of the Marquises of Massa and Corsica.

== Sources ==
- "Carte IGN classique", Géoportail (in French)
- Istria, Daniel (2005), Pouvoirs et fortifications dans le nord de la Corse : du xie siècle au xive siècle (in French), Ajacci: Éditions Alain Piazzola, ISBN 978-2915410143
- "Node: Col de San Colombano (1641832757)", OpenStreetMap
