= Regino (river) =

River in the department of Haute-Corse, Corsica

Regino River
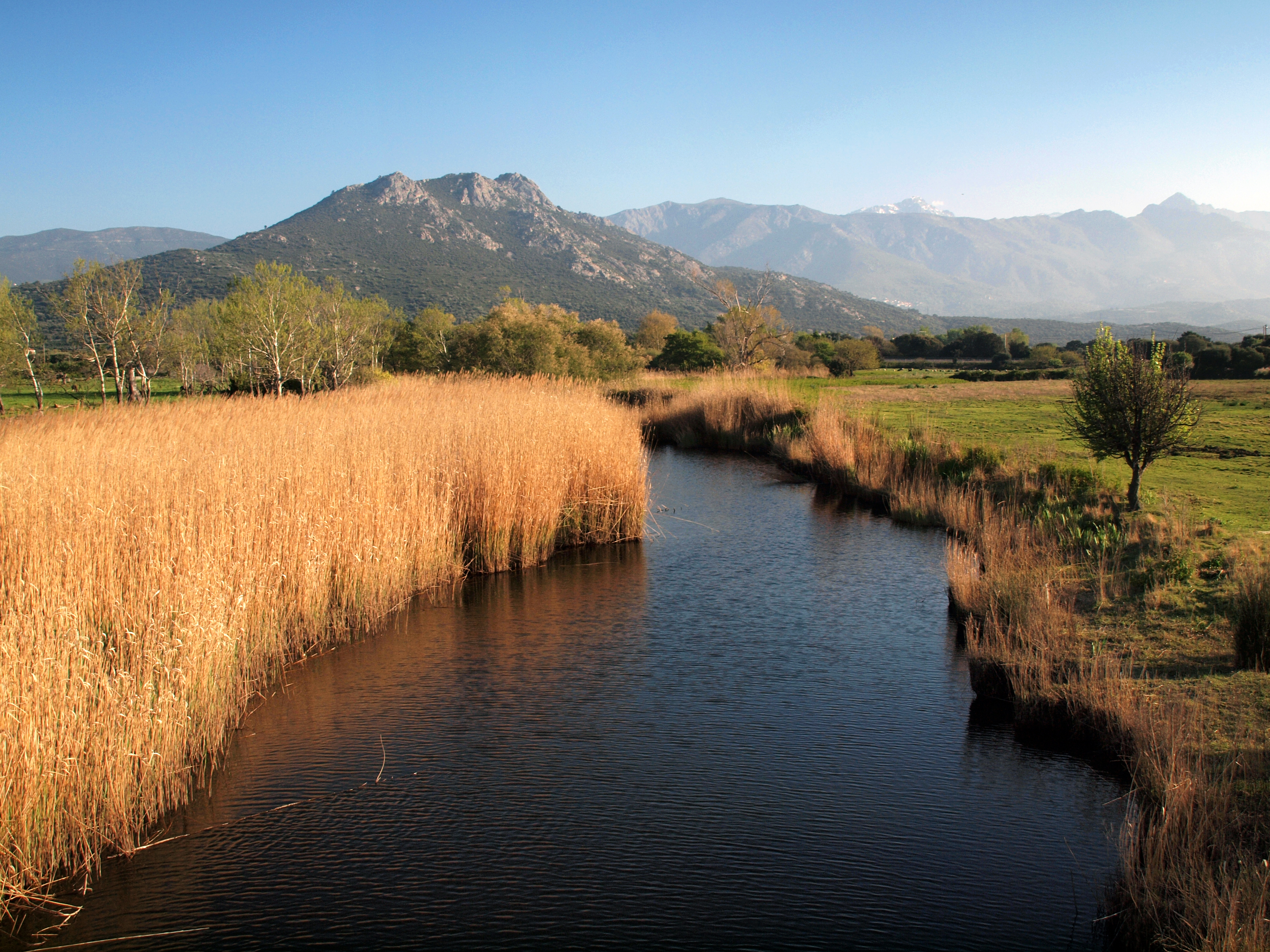
- The Regino near its mouth

- Location within Corsica Location within France
- Native name: Fiume di Regino (Corsican)

Location
- Country: France
- Region: Corsica
- Department: Haute-Corse

Physical characteristics
- Mouth: Mediterranean Sea
  - location: Belgodère
  - coordinates: 42°38′26″N 9°00′27″E

The Regino River (Corsican: Fiume di Regino) is a small coastal river in the department of Haute-Corse, Corsica, France.

== Course ==
The Regino is 19.33 kilometres (12.01 mi) long. It crosses the communes of Belgodère, Feliceto, Occhiatana, Speloncato, Santa-Reparata-di-Balagna and Ville-di-Paraso.

The Regino rises in the canton of Feliceto to the west of the 1,688 metres (5,538 ft) San Parteo mountain. It flows in a north-northwest direction, passing between the villages of Feliceto and Nessa, then turns to run in a northeast direction to its mouth on the Mediterranean Sea. It is dammed to the south of L'Île-Rousse to form the Lac de Codole. The dam was built in the early 1980s by the Société de Développement Agricole de la Corse (SOMIVAC) to supply water to the eastern part of the Balagne region for drinking and irrigation.

== Watershed ==
There are about 90 kilometres (56 mi) of streams in the Reginu watershed, which covers more than 110 square kilometres (42 sq mi). The reservoir is supplied by a watershed of 39 square kilometres (15 sq mi). The Reginu valley has a Mediterranean climate, with little rain in the summer. It regularly has strong west or southwest winds. The landscape includes pastures, cultivated olive, almond and citrus groves, and abandoned scrub and forest. Vegetation includes heather (Erica arborea), Arbutus unedo, oak forests (Quercus ilex, Quercus suber and some Quercus pubescens), lavender (Lavandula stoechas), rosemary (Rosmarinus officinalis), Genista corsica and many Cistus species.

== Hydrology ==
Measurements of the river flow were taken at the Speloncato [Regino] station from 1968 to 1989. The watershed above this station covers 44.7 square kilometres (17.3 sq mi). Annual precipitation was calculated as 300 millimetres (12 in). The average flow of water throughout the year was 0.424 cubic metres per second (15.0 cu ft/s).

Average flow (cubic meters per second) by month for the period 1968 to 1989
Month	Flow
Jan	0.644
Feb	0.671
Mar	0.785
Apr	0.668
May	0.376
Jun	0.146
Jul	0.073
Aug	0.134
Sep	0.254
Oct	0.221
Nov	0.549
Dec	0.590

== Tributaries ==
The following streams (ruisseaux) are tributaries of the Regino, ordered by length:

- San Clemente 10 km (6.2 mi)
- Erbaiola 7 km (4.3 mi)
- Carignelli 6 km (3.7 mi)
- Piano 4 km (2.5 mi)
- Novalella 3 km (1.9 mi)
- Aldinu 2 km (1.2 mi)
- Cammariu 2 km (1.2 mi)
- Canne 2 km (1.2 mi)
- Saltu 2 km (1.2 mi)
- Campumignani 2 km (1.2 mi)
- Piombone 2 km (1.2 mi)
- Cervione 2 km (1.2 mi)
- Valdu Alle Grotte 2 km (1.2 mi)

== Gallery ==
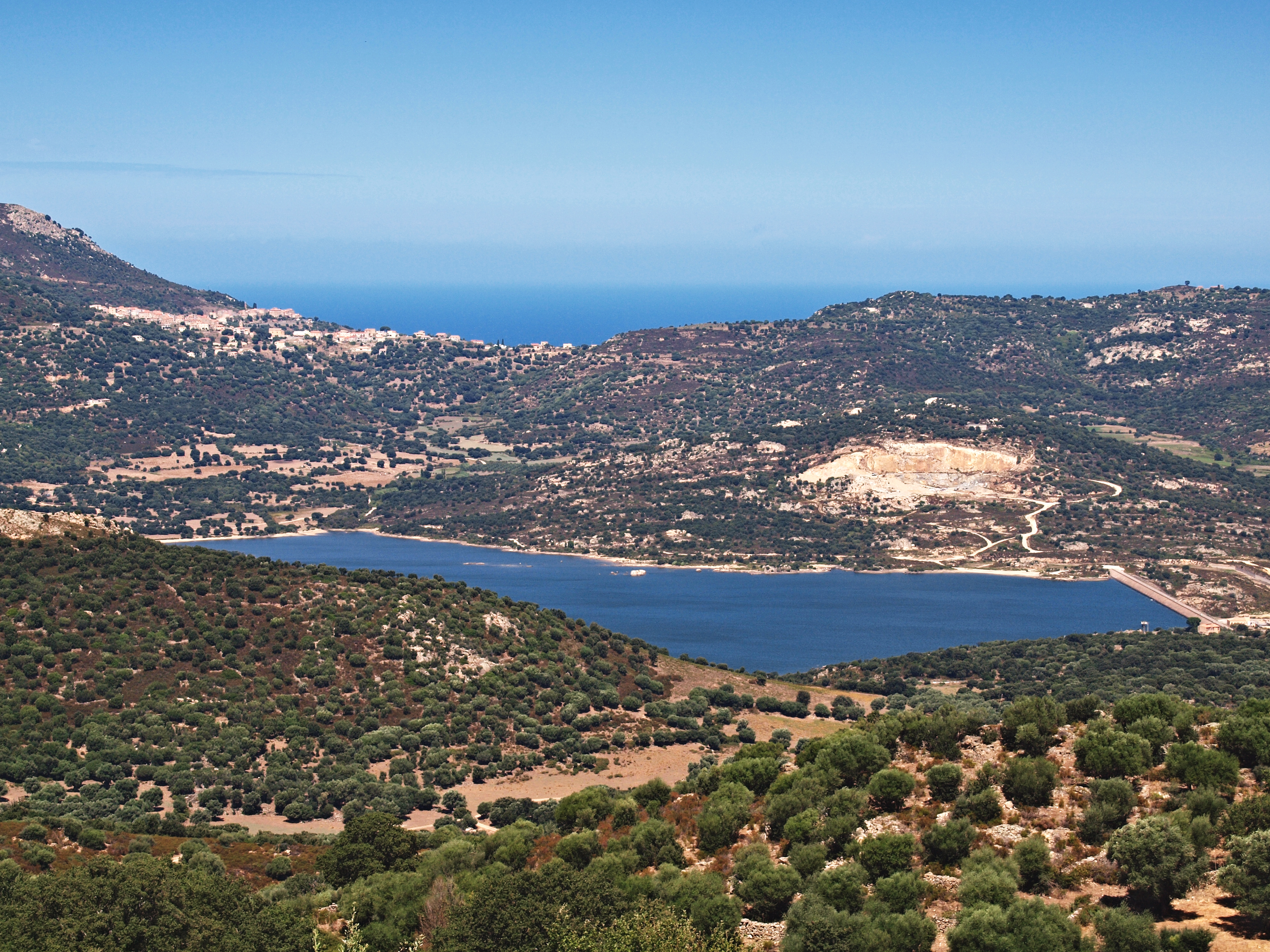
Lac de Codole

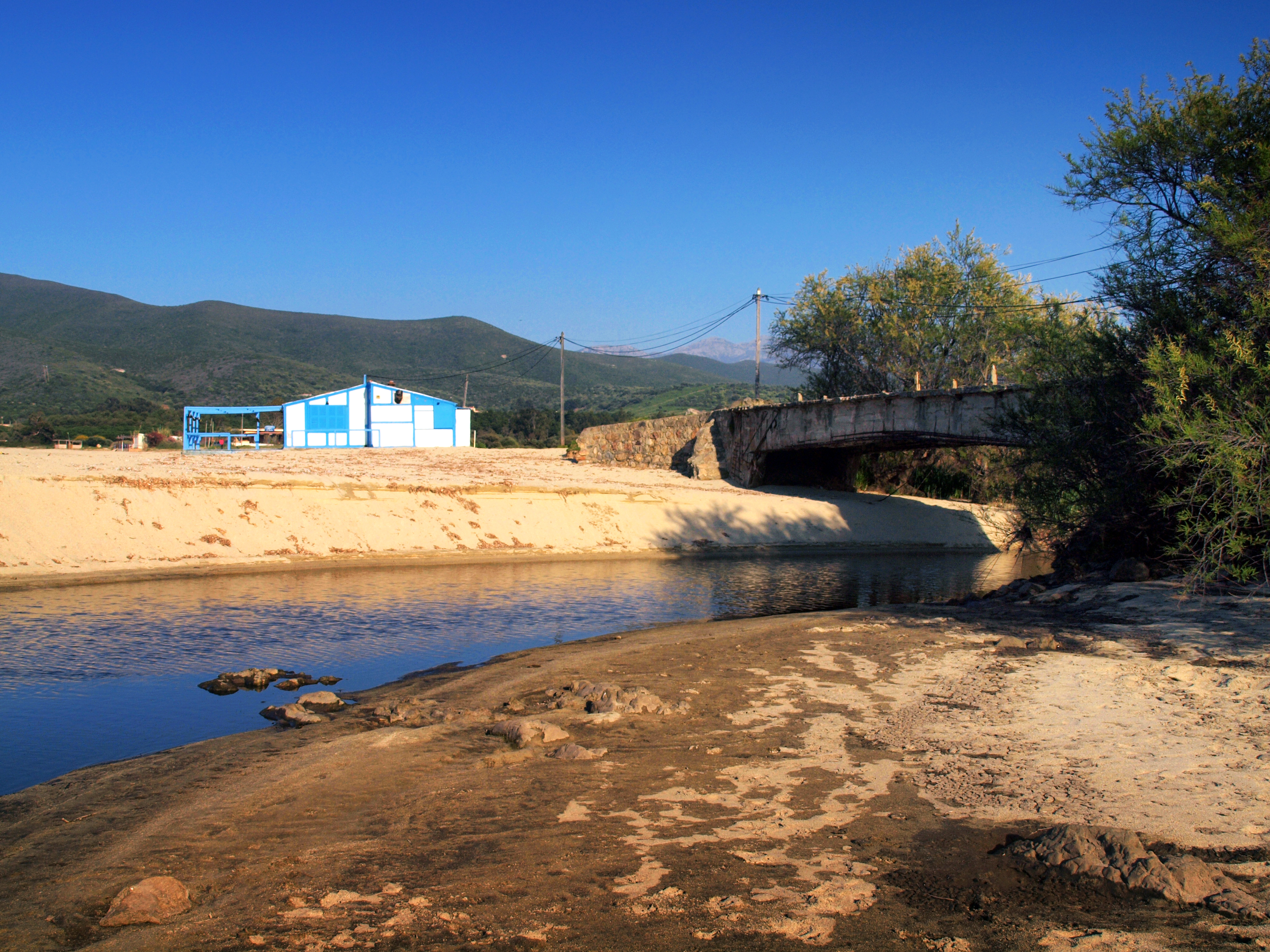
Regino bridge at Lozari

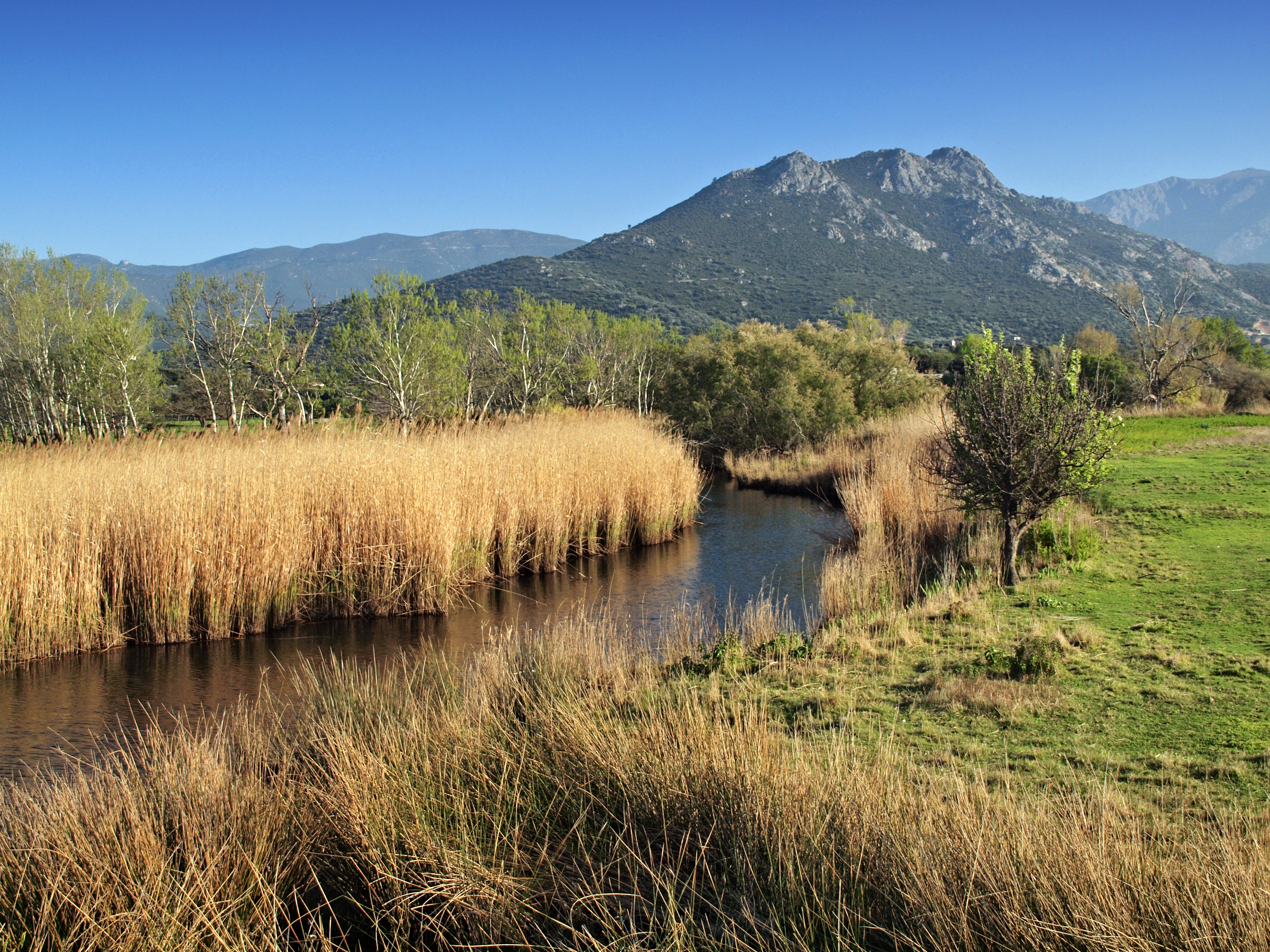
The Regino above its mouth

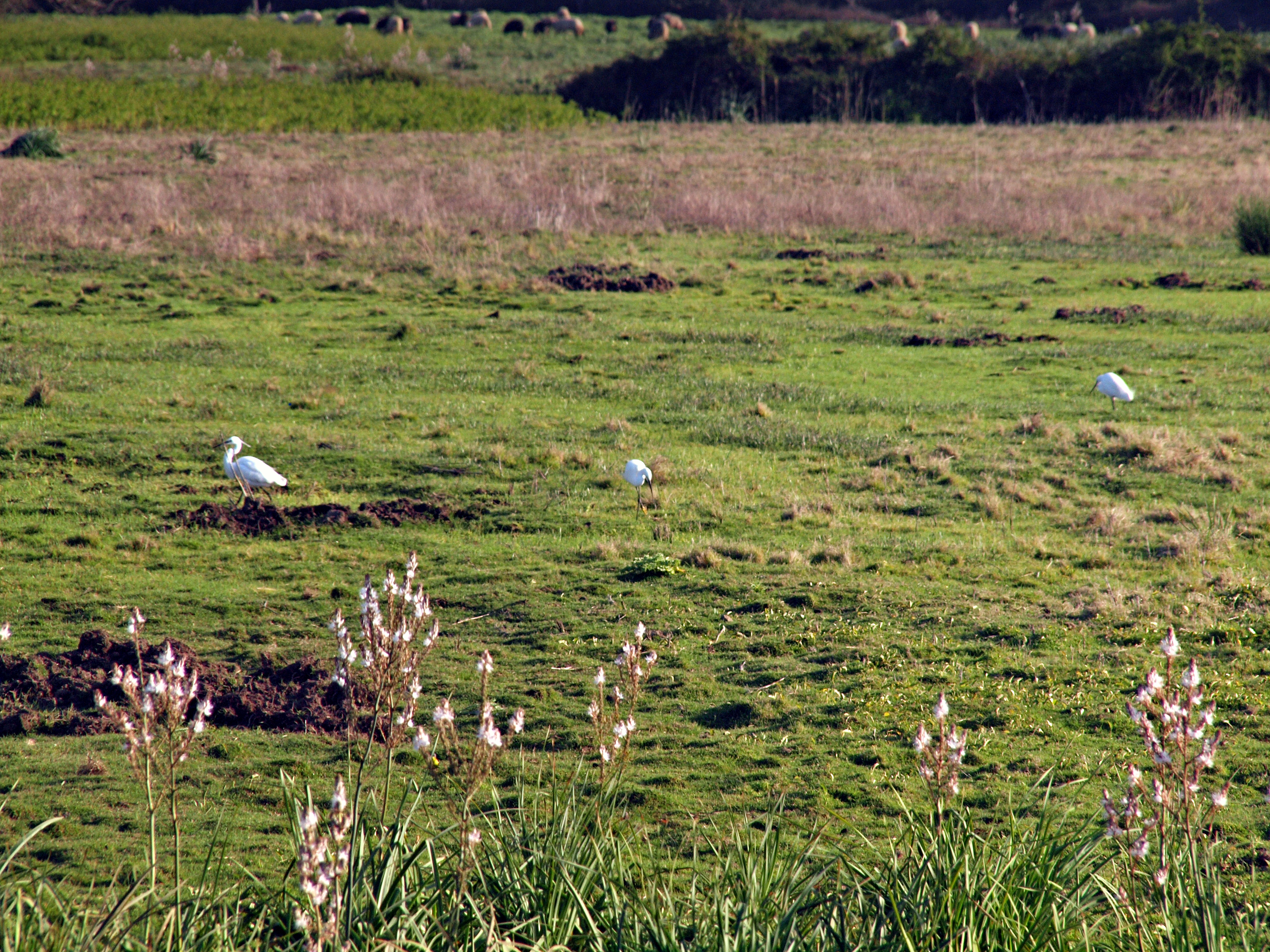
Meadow on the edge of the Regino, facing the reed bed at its mouth

== Sources ==
- Corse : Barrage de Codole (in French), CFBR Comité Français des Barrages et Réservoirs
- "Fiume di Regino", Sandre (in French)
- "Le Regino à Speloncato [Regino]", eaufrance (in French), Ministère de l'Ecologie, du Développement Durable et de l'Energie
- Levadoux, Damien (December 2005), Plan d'amenagement des berges du plan d'eau de Codole (in French), AAPNRC/CEN Corse
- "Relation: Fiume di Regino (9417732)", OpenStreetMap
