= Montegrosso (disambiguation) =

Montegrosso or Monte Grosso may refer to:

- Montegrosso, a French municipality in Corsica
- Monte Grosso, a French mountain in Corsica
- Montegrosso d'Asti, an Italian municipality in Piedmont
