= Regino =

Regino may refer to:

- Regino (river), small coastal river in the department of Haute-Corse, Corsica, France

== People ==
- April Boy Regino (1961–2020), Filipino singer
- Jacinto Regino Pachano (1835–1903), Venezuelan writer and politician
- Regino of Prüm (died 915), Benedictine churchman
- Regino C. Hermosisima, Jr. (born 1927), Filipino judge
- Regino Díaz Relova (1874–1961), Filipino military officer
- Regino Garcia (1840–1916), Filipino artist, botanist and forester
- Regino García (1875–?), Cuban baseball catcher
- Regino Hernández (born 1991), Spanish snowboarder
- Regino Pedroso (1896–1983), Cuban poet
- Regino Ramirez, Texas, a census-designated place the United States
- Regino Sainz de la Maza (1896–1981), Spanish classical guitarist and composer
- Regino Ylanan (1889–1963), Filipino athlete, physician and sports administrator
- Regino (footballer) (born 1988), Spanish footballer born José Franco Gómez
