= Occhiatana =

- Commune
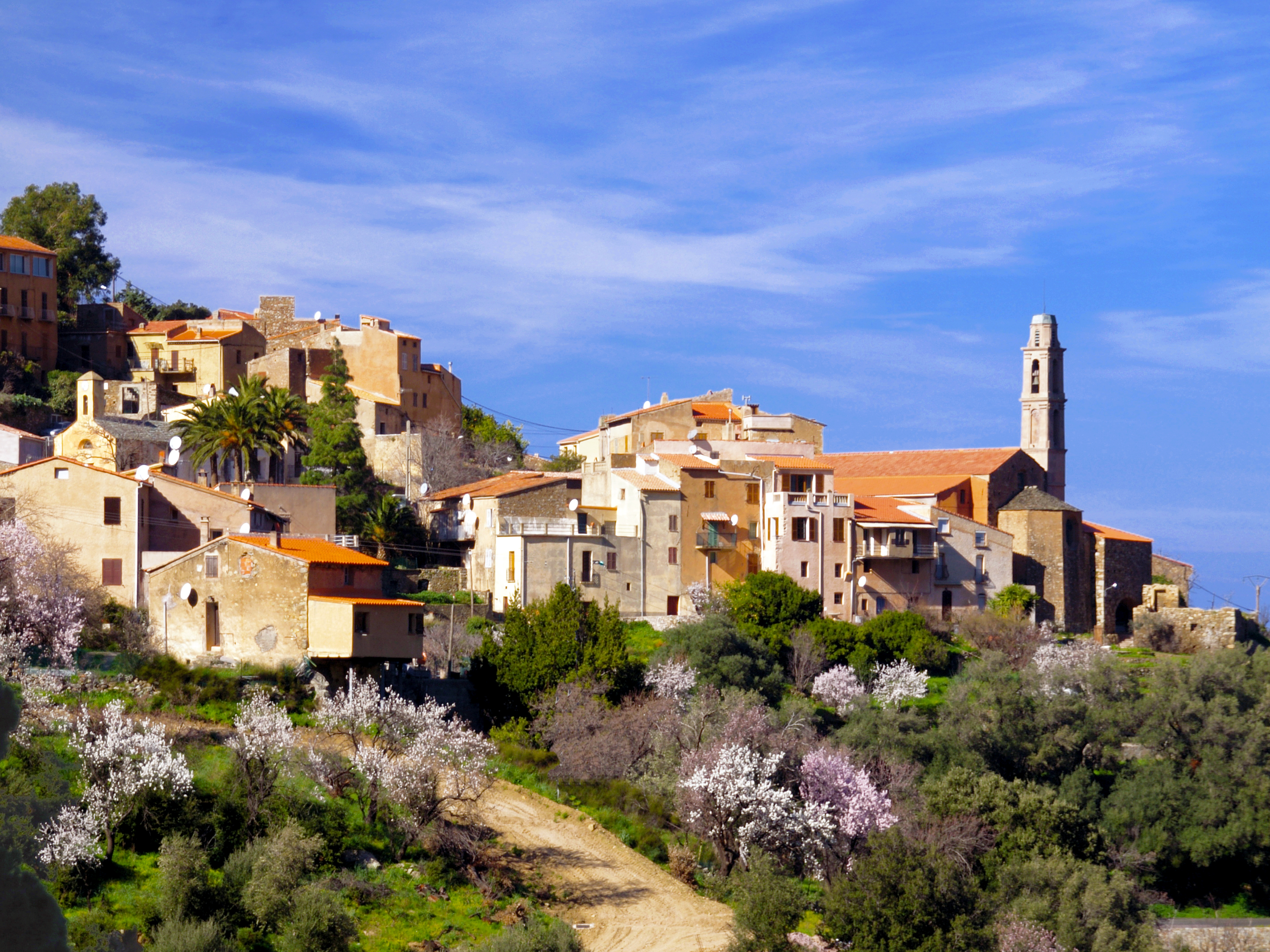
- The church and surrounding buildings in Occhiatana
- Location of Occhiatana
- Location within France Location within Corsica
- Coordinates: 42°34′30″N 9°00′33″E
- Country: France
- Region: Corsica
- Department: Haute-Corse
- Arrondissement: Calvi
- Canton: L'Île-Rousse

Government
  - Mayor (2020–2026): Stéphane Orsoni
- Area^{1}: 12.62 km^{2} (4.87 sq mi)
- Elevation: 350 m (1,150 ft)
- Highest elevation: 1,163 m (3,816 ft)
- Lowest elevation: 0 m (0 ft)
- Population (2023): 235
  - Density: 18.6/km^{2} (48.2/sq mi)
- Time zone: UTC+01:00 (CET)
  - Summer (DST): UTC+02:00 (CEST)
- INSEE/Postal code: 2B182 /20226
- ^{1} French Land Register data, which excludes lakes, ponds, glaciers > 1 km^{2} (0.386 sq mi or 247 acres) and river estuaries.

Occhiatana (French pronunciation: [ɔkjatana]; Corsican: Ochjatana) is a commune in the Haute-Corse department of France on the island of Corsica.

== Population ==
Historical population
Year	Pop.	±% p.a.
1968	154	—
1975	178	+2.09%
1982	185	+0.55%
1990	165	−1.42%
1999	163	−0.14%
2007	173	+0.75%
2012	176	+0.34%
2017	246	+6.93%
2023	235	−0.76%
Source: INSEE

== See also ==
- Tour de Pianosa
- Communes of the Haute-Corse department
