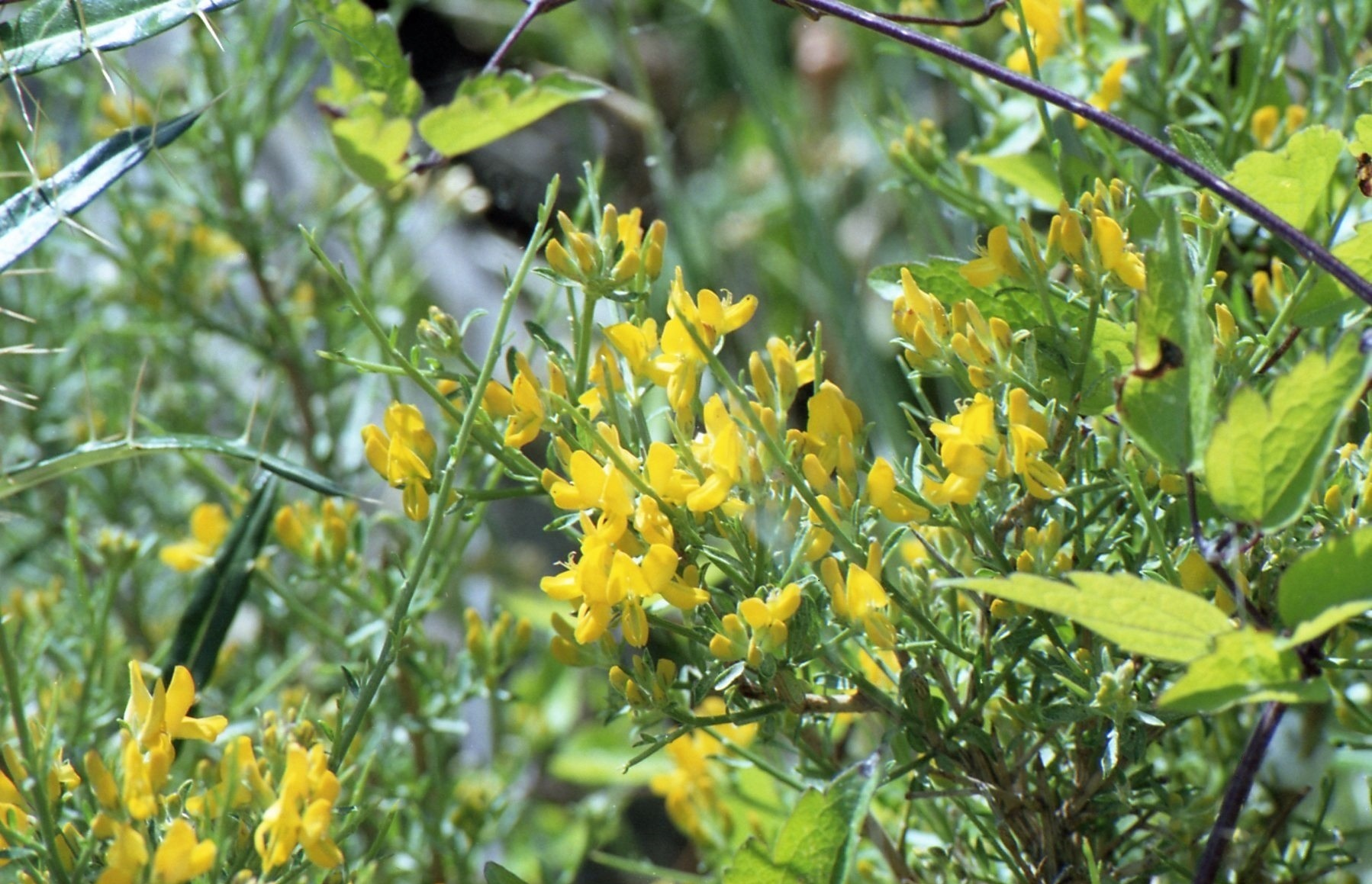

Scientific classification
- Kingdom: Plantae
- Clade: Tracheophytes
- Clade: Angiosperms
- Clade: Eudicots
- Clade: Rosids
- Order: Fabales
- Family: Fabaceae
- Subfamily: Faboideae
- Genus: Genista
- Species: G. corsica

Binomial name
- Genista corsica (Loisel.) DC.

= Genista corsica =

Species of flowering plant

Genista corsica is a plant endemic to Corsica and Sardinia where it is associated with sunny open landscapes and poor stony soil. It is a common constituent of garrigue and maquis communities.

== Description ==
Genista corsica is an erect or spreading intricately branched shrub with stout lateral spreading spines, 20–100 cm tall. Leaves inconspicuous, simple, elliptical and slightly hairy beneath. Flowers yellow 7–12 mm long. Calyx teeth as long as tube. Pod narrow-oblong, 12–20 mm long constricted between the seeds. Flowers from May to June. Exposed rocky and bushy slopes in lowland and lower mountains.

== Gallery ==
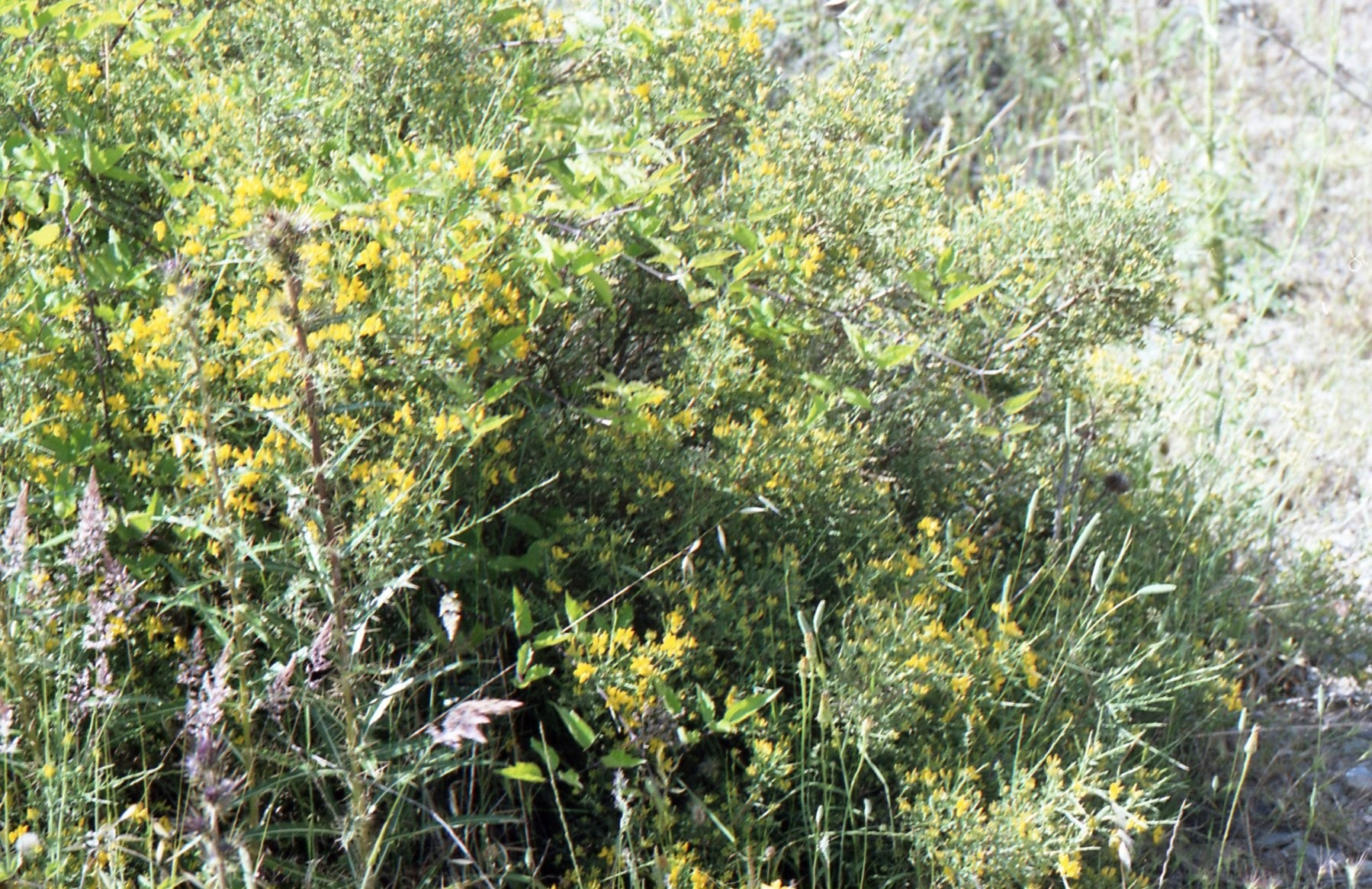
Genista corsica.

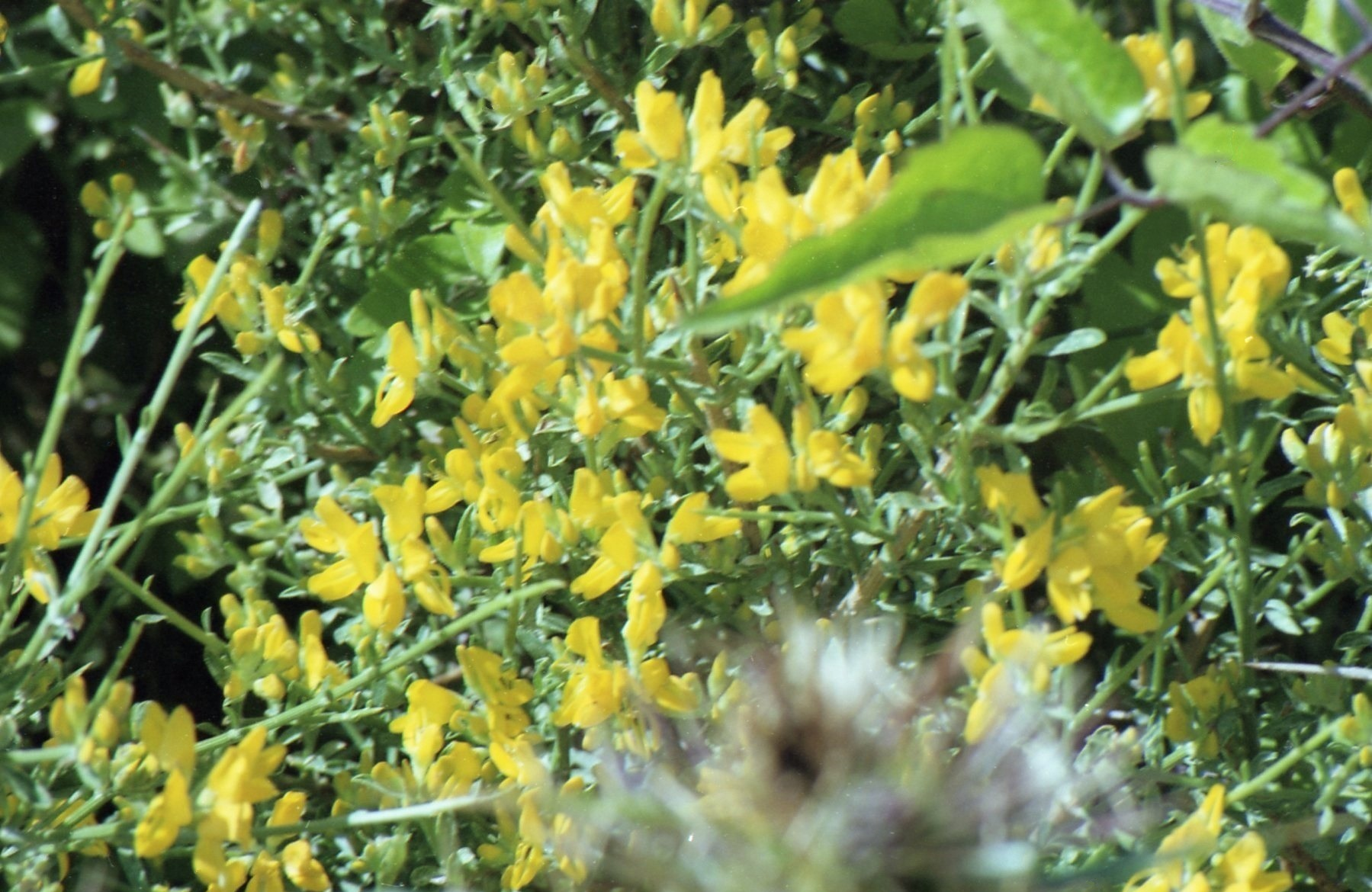
Genista corsica

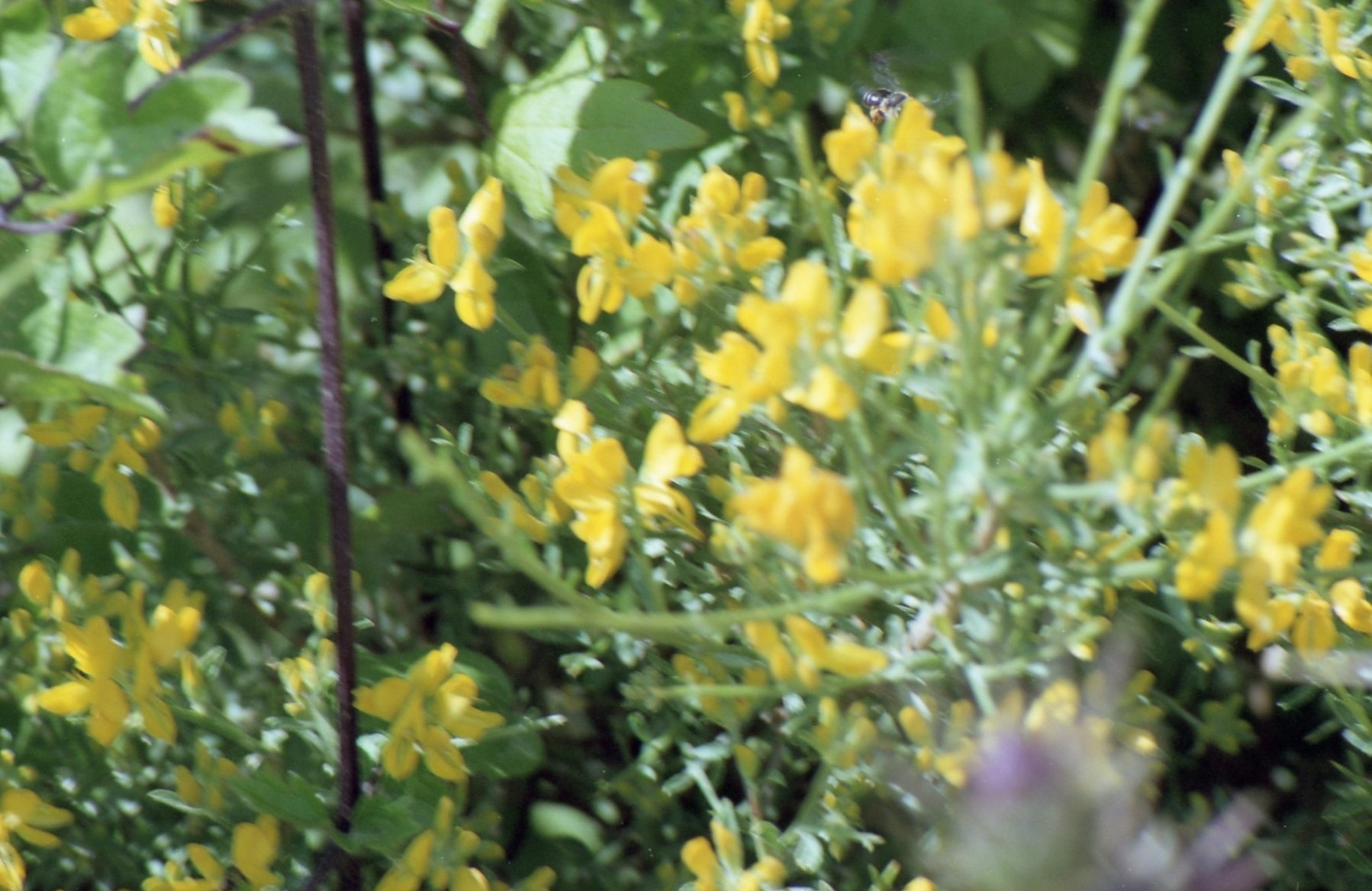
Genista corsica.

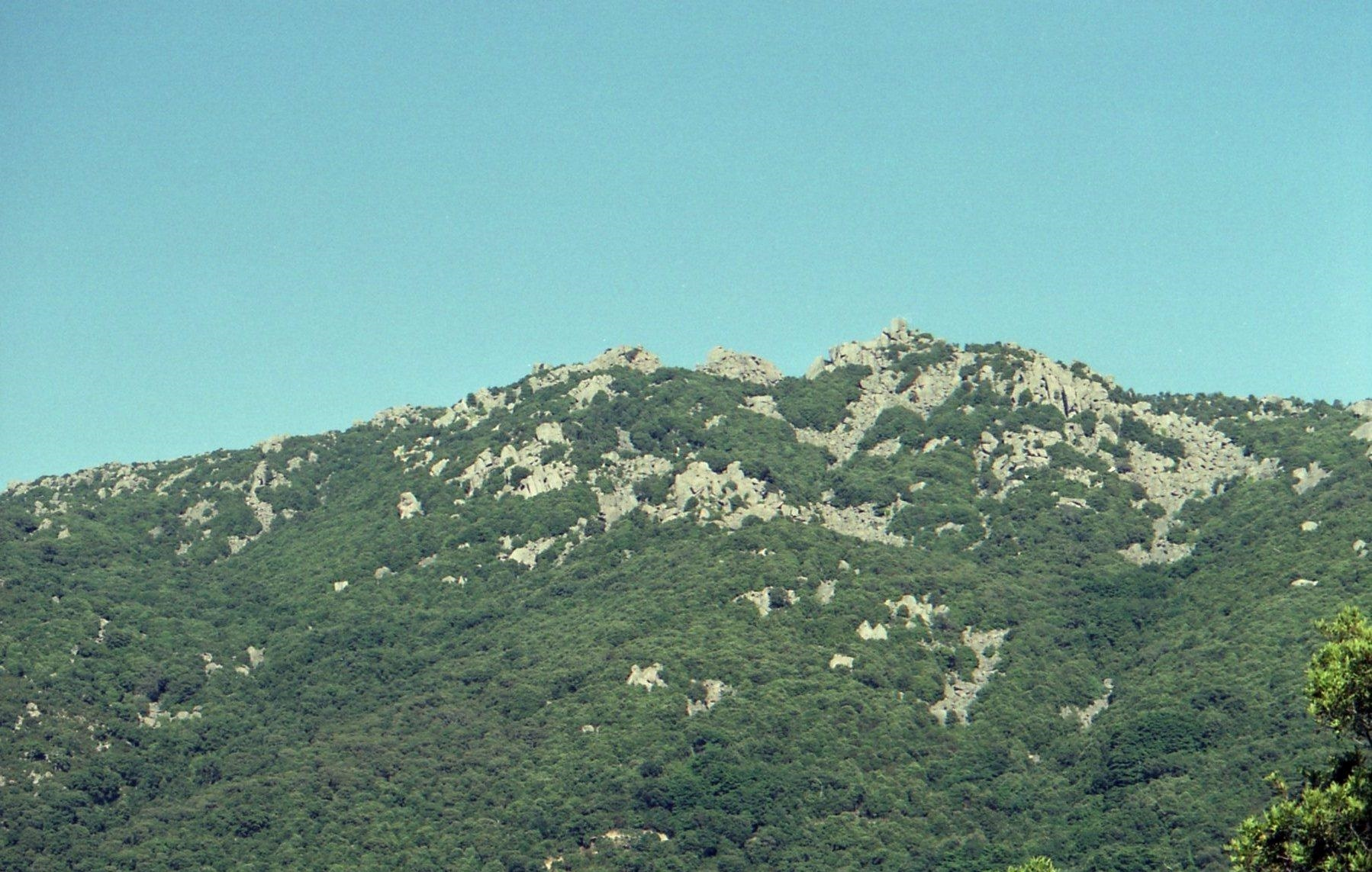
Genista corsica habitat in the northern Supramonte mountain range.
