= Pioggiola =

- Commune
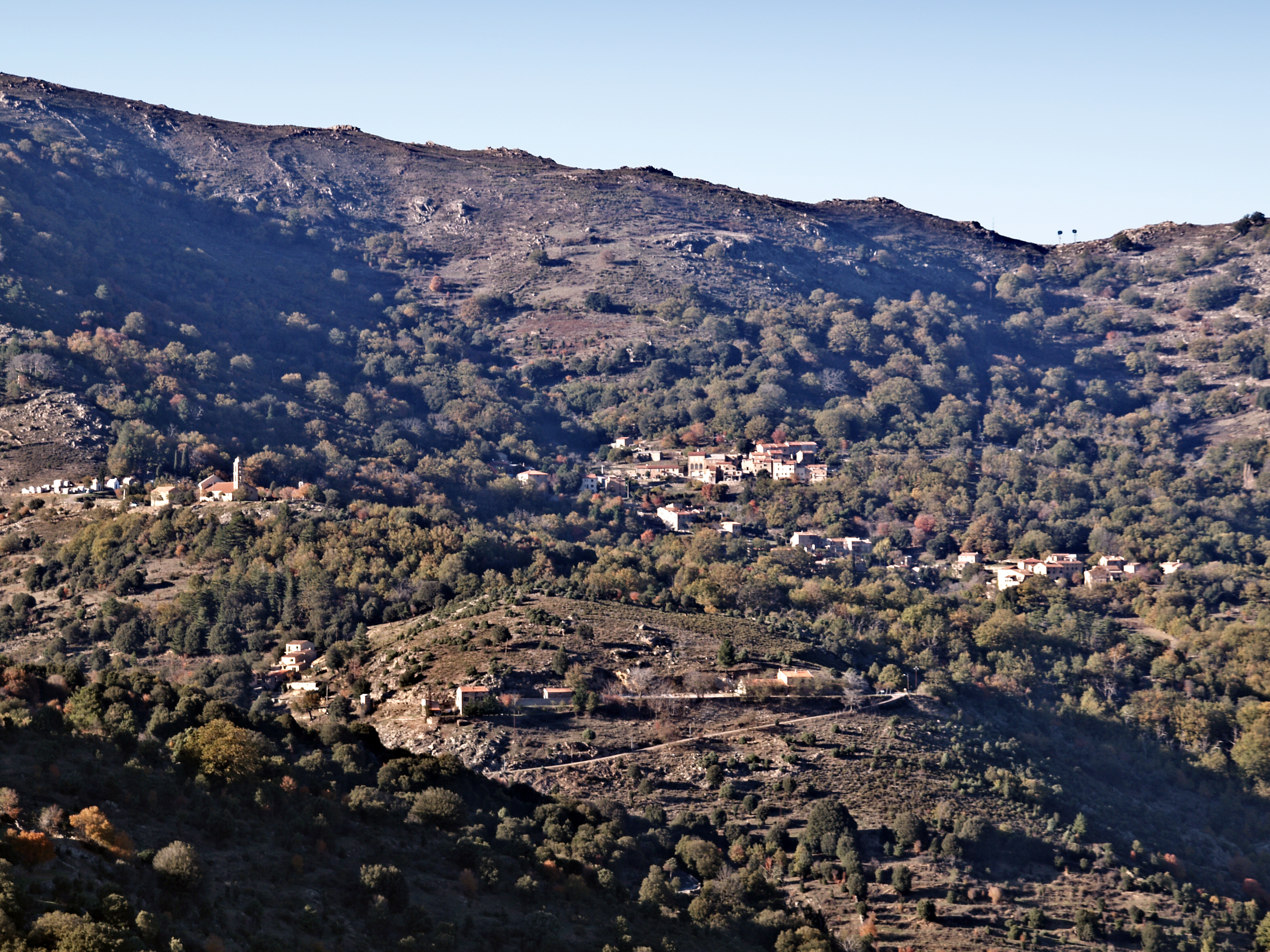
- A general view of Pioggiola
- Location of Pioggiola
- Location within France Location within Corsica
- Coordinates: 42°32′15″N 8°59′55″E
- Country: France
- Region: Corsica
- Department: Haute-Corse
- Arrondissement: Calvi
- Canton: L'Île-Rousse
- Intercommunality: l'Ile-Rousse - Balagne

Government
  - Mayor (2020–2026): Antone Casanova
- Area^{1}: 18.59 km^{2} (7.18 sq mi)
- Elevation: 1,000 m (3,300 ft)
- Highest elevation: 1,935 m (6,348 ft)
- Lowest elevation: 643 m (2,110 ft)
- Population (2023): 87
  - Density: 4.7/km^{2} (12/sq mi)
- Time zone: UTC+01:00 (CET)
  - Summer (DST): UTC+02:00 (CEST)
- INSEE/Postal code: 2B235 /20259
- ^{1} French Land Register data, which excludes lakes, ponds, glaciers > 1 km^{2} (0.386 sq mi or 247 acres) and river estuaries.

Pioggiola (French pronunciation: [pjɔdʒɔla]; Corsican: Piogiula) is a commune located in the Haute-Corse department of France on the island of Corsica.

== Population ==
Historical population
Year	Pop.	±% p.a.
1968	83	—
1975	79	−0.70%
1982	34	−11.35%
1990	49	+4.67%
1999	69	+3.88%
2007	89	+3.23%
2012	88	−0.23%
2017	88	+0.00%
2023	87	−0.19%
Source: INSEE

== See also ==
- Communes of the Haute-Corse department
