= Belgodère =

- Commune
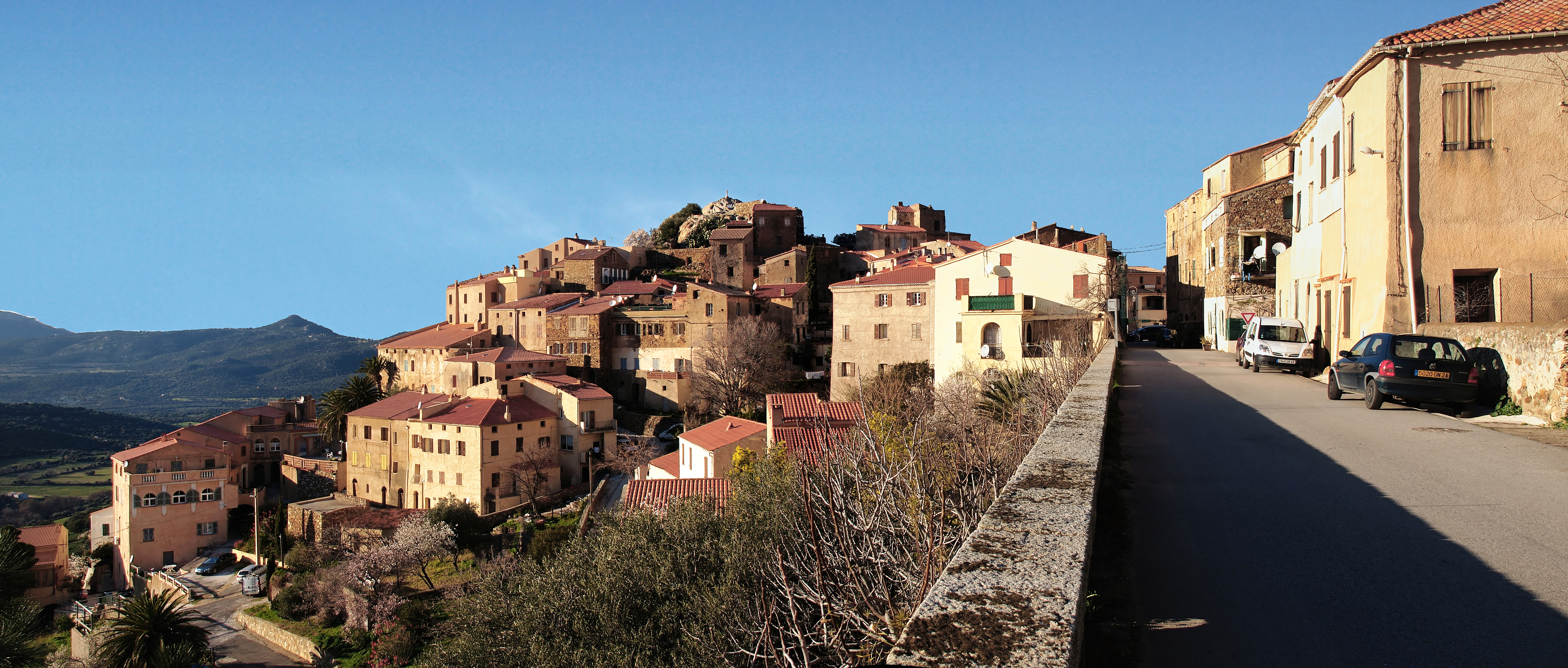
- Panorama from the RD71 road
- Location of Belgodère
- Location within France Location within Corsica
- Coordinates: 42°35′11″N 9°01′07″E
- Country: France
- Region: Corsica
- Department: Haute-Corse
- Arrondissement: Calvi
- Canton: L'Île-Rousse

Government
  - Mayor (2020–2026): Lionel Mortini
- Area^{1}: 13.01 km^{2} (5.02 sq mi)
- Elevation: 310 m (1,020 ft)
- Highest elevation: 811 m (2,661 ft)
- Lowest elevation: 0 m (0 ft)
- Population (2023): 835
  - Density: 64.2/km^{2} (166/sq mi)
- Time zone: UTC+01:00 (CET)
  - Summer (DST): UTC+02:00 (CEST)
- INSEE/Postal code: 2B034 /20226
- ^{1} French Land Register data, which excludes lakes, ponds, glaciers > 1 km^{2} (0.386 sq mi or 247 acres) and river estuaries.

Belgodère (French pronunciation: [bɛlɡɔdɛʁ]; Italian: Belgodere; Corsican: Bargudè) is a commune in the Haute-Corse department of France on the island of Corsica.

== Population ==
Historical population
Year	Pop.	±% p.a.
1968	443	—
1975	367	−2.65%
1982	453	+3.05%
1990	331	−3.85%
1999	371	+1.28%
2007	467	+2.92%
2012	525	+2.37%
2017	623	+3.48%
2023	835	+5.00%
Source: INSEE

== See also ==
- Torra di Lozari
- Communes of the Haute-Corse department
