= Olmi-Cappella =

- Commune
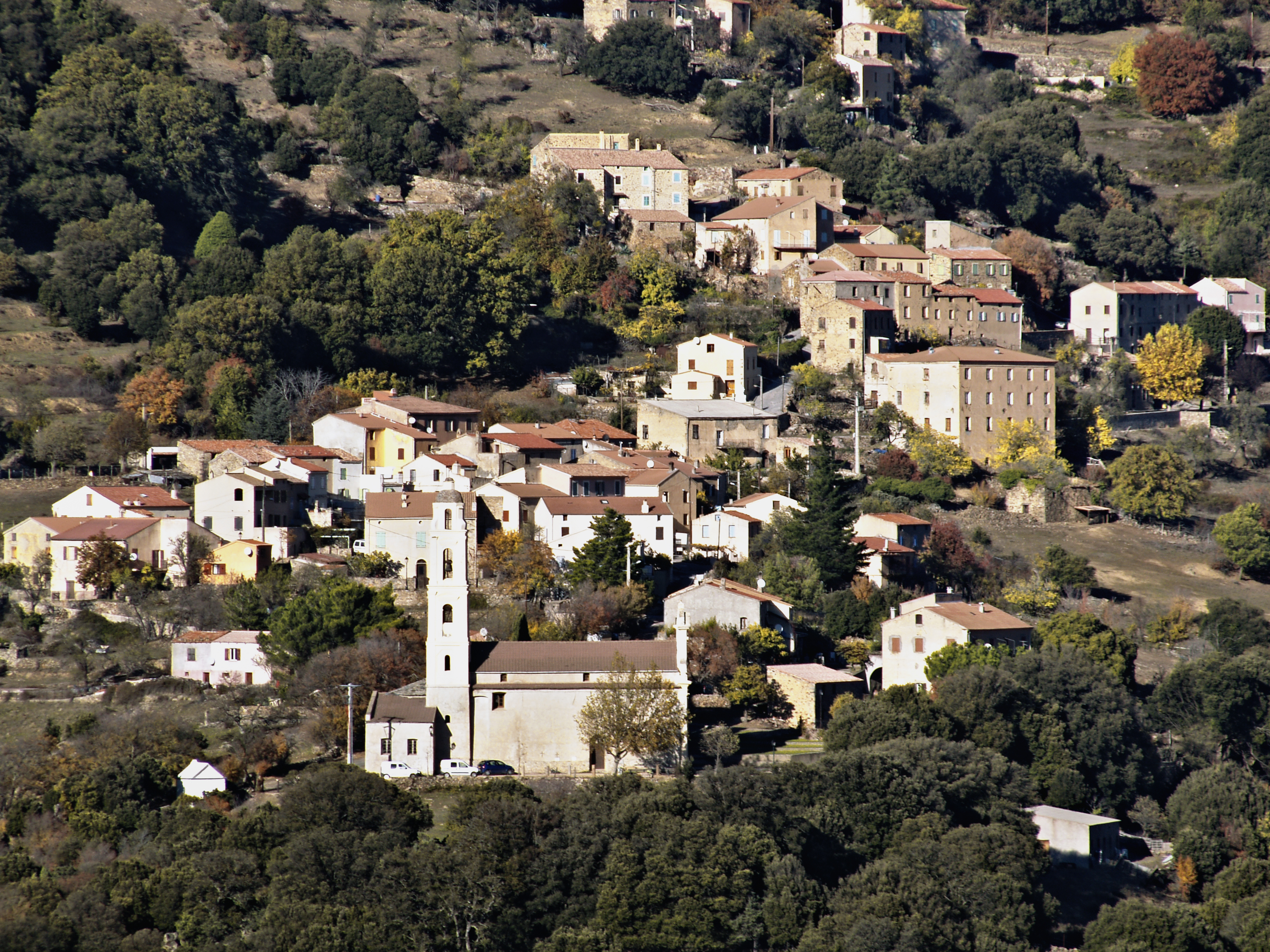
- The village of Olmi, in Olmi-Cappella

- Coat of arms
- Location of Olmi-Cappella
- Location within France Location within Corsica
- Coordinates: 42°31′38″N 9°01′09″E
- Country: France
- Region: Corsica
- Department: Haute-Corse
- Arrondissement: Calvi
- Canton: L'Île-Rousse

Government
  - Mayor (2020–2026): Frédéric Mariani
- Area^{1}: 51.1 km^{2} (19.7 sq mi)
- Elevation: 880 m (2,890 ft)
- Highest elevation: 2,389 m (7,838 ft)
- Lowest elevation: 456 m (1,496 ft)
- Population (2023): 190
  - Density: 3.7/km^{2} (9.6/sq mi)
- Time zone: UTC+01:00 (CET)
  - Summer (DST): UTC+02:00 (CEST)
- INSEE/Postal code: 2B190 /20259
- ^{1} French Land Register data, which excludes lakes, ponds, glaciers > 1 km^{2} (0.386 sq mi or 247 acres) and river estuaries.

Olmi-Cappella (French pronunciation: [ɔlmi kapɛla]; Corsican: Olmi è Cappella) is a commune in the Haute-Corse department of France on the island of Corsica.

== Population ==
Historical population
Year	Pop.	±% p.a.
1968	234	—
1975	222	−0.75%
1982	202	−1.34%
1990	147	−3.90%
1999	143	−0.31%
2007	183	+3.13%
2012	184	+0.11%
2017	180	−0.44%
2023	190	+0.91%
Source: INSEE

== See also ==
- Communes of the Haute-Corse department
