= Monte Grosso =

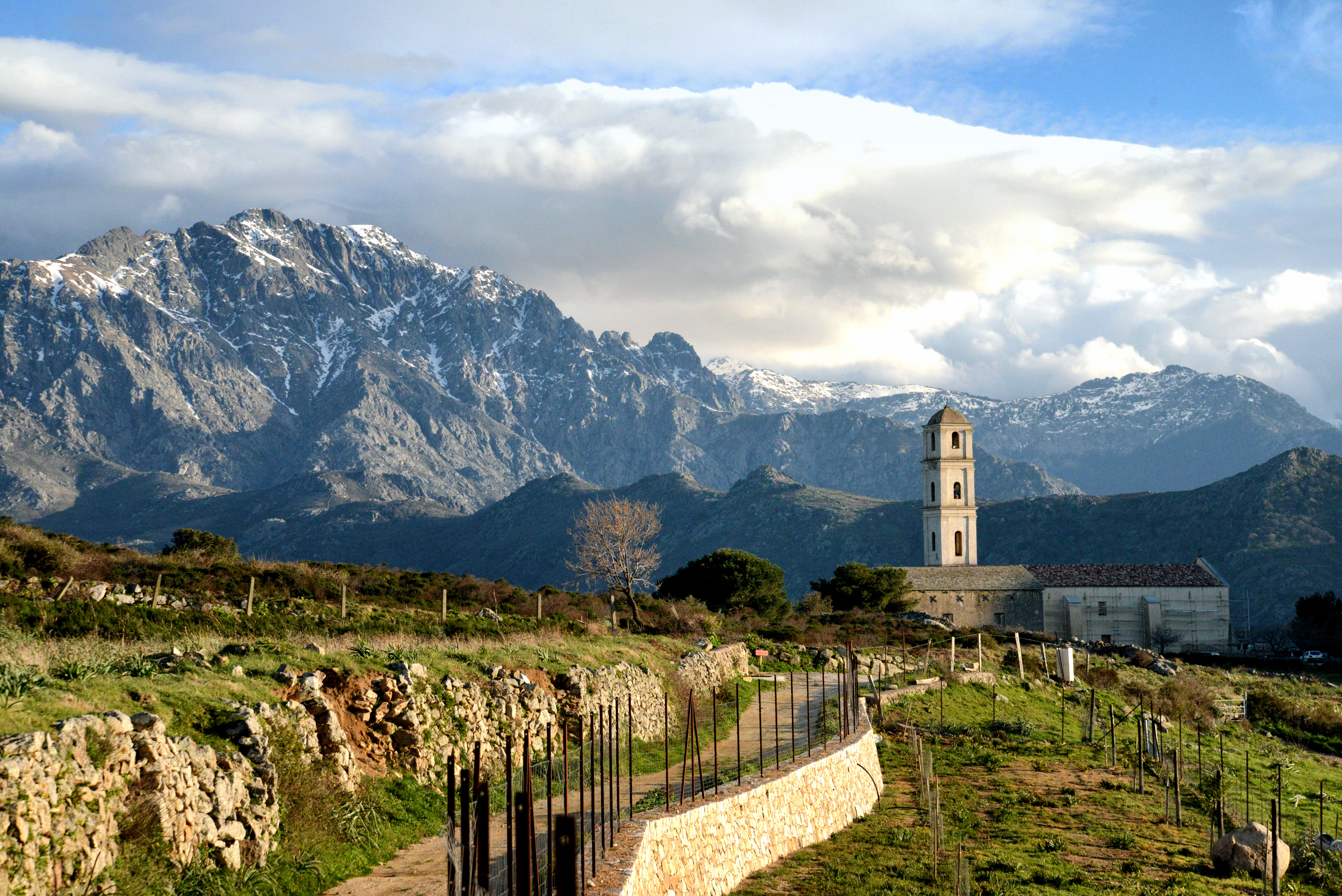
- Monte Grosso seen from Sant'Antonino

Highest point
- Elevation: 1937
- Coordinates: 42°30′N 8°55′E

Geography
- Location within Corsica
- Country: France
- Department: Haute-Corse
- Parent range: Monte Cinto Massif

Monte Grosso is a mountain in Haute-Corse, Corsica, France, with an elevation of 1,937 metres (6,355 ft). It belongs to the Monte Cinto Massif.
