= Aregno =

- Commune
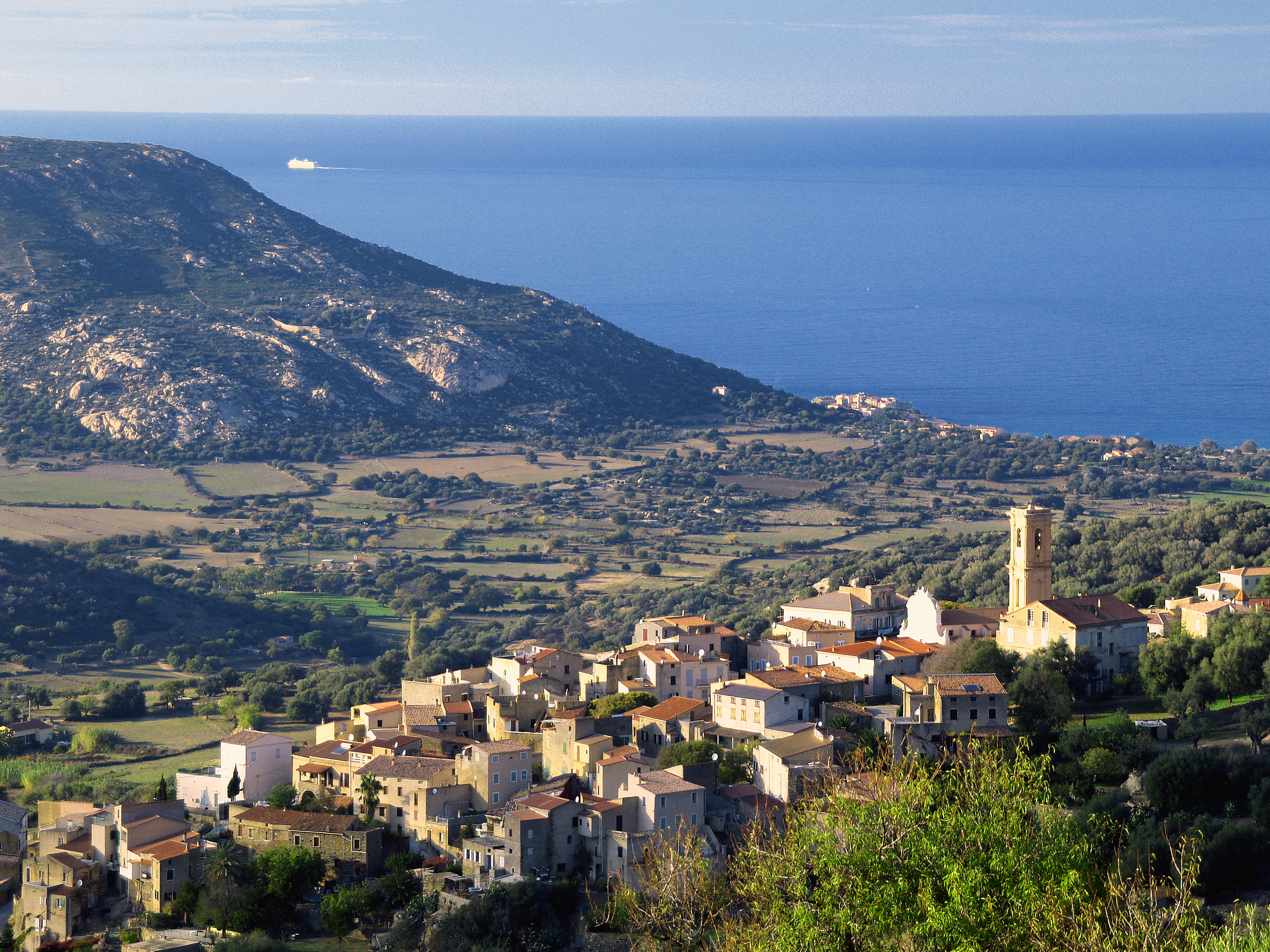
- A general view of Aregno
- Location of Aregno
- Location within France Location within Corsica
- Coordinates: 42°34′55″N 8°53′42″E
- Country: France
- Region: Corsica
- Department: Haute-Corse
- Arrondissement: Calvi
- Canton: Calvi
- Intercommunality: Calvi Balagne

Government
  - Mayor (2020–2026): David Calassa
- Area^{1}: 9.3 km^{2} (3.6 sq mi)
- Elevation: 210 m (690 ft)
- Highest elevation: 326 m (1,070 ft)
- Lowest elevation: 0 m (0 ft)
- Population (2023): 588
  - Density: 63/km^{2} (160/sq mi)
- Time zone: UTC+01:00 (CET)
  - Summer (DST): UTC+02:00 (CEST)
- INSEE/Postal code: 2B020 /20220
- ^{1} French Land Register data, which excludes lakes, ponds, glaciers > 1 km^{2} (0.386 sq mi or 247 acres) and river estuaries.

Aregno (Corsican: Aregnu) is a commune in the Haute-Corse department on the island of Corsica, France. The village was previously part of the piève of Aregnu in the former Genovese province of Balagna.

The commune has been awarded three flowers by the National Council of Towns and Villages in Bloom in the Competition of cities and villages in Bloom.

== Geography ==
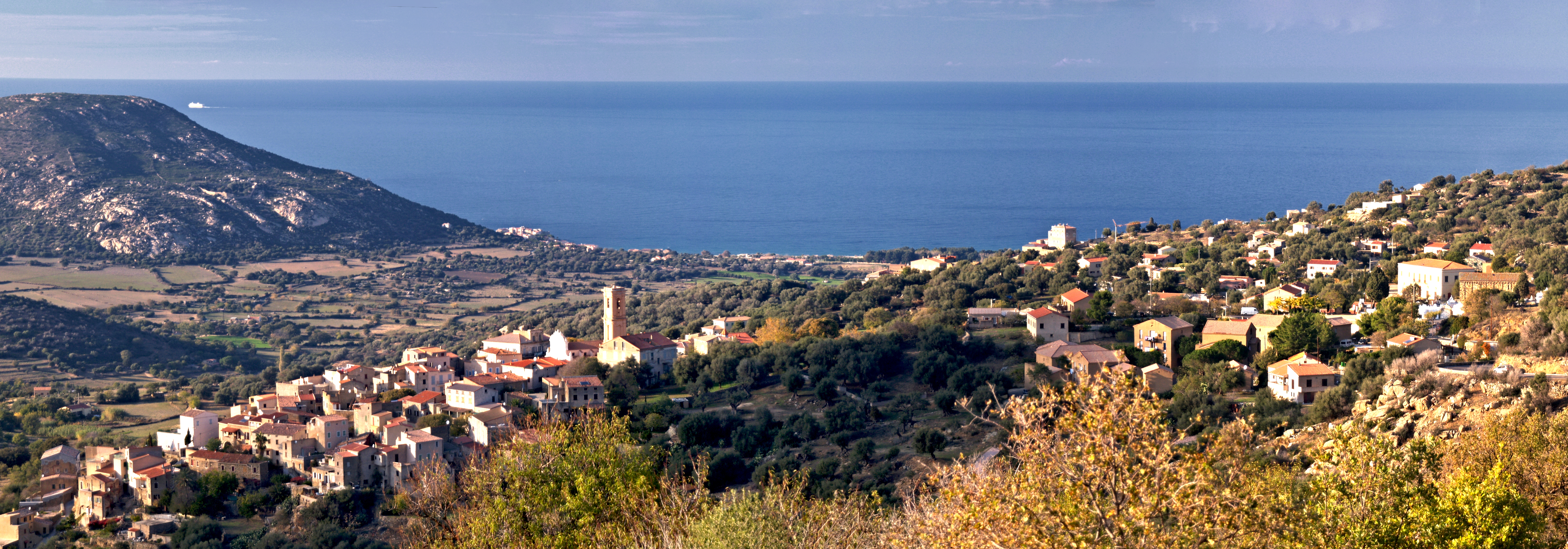
A panoramic view of Aregno

Aregno is located immediately to the east of Algajola and extends from west to east between Algajola, Lavatoggio, Cateri, Sant'Antonino, Pigna, and Corbara. Its highest point is 326 metres above sea level and it has a total area of some 930 hectares. Access to the commune is by National Route N197 from Algajola in the west and continuing to Corzo to the north-east. Access to the village is by road D551 which branches off the N197 and continues south through the commune by a circuitous route to the village. There is also the D151 road from Pigna in the north-east, passing through the village and continuing south to join the D71 south-east of Cateri. The CFC railway from Algajola passes through the commune near the beach with the Aregno-beach station an important stop for the summer "beach tramway" along the coast and the beaches between Calvi and L'Ile-Rousse.

Between the sea and the village, the Aregno plain is crossed by the Teghiella stream, which joins the Pozzi stream, and the Migliani stream later on. It flows into the Mediterranean at the east end of Aregno beach, at the edge of the Calcinaiu Natural Site in Corbara.

Aregno has a narrow sea front, mostly sandy beach, which extends between Corbara and Algajola.

=== Localities and Hamlets ===
The commune includes the following inhabited areas:

- Aregno village, old and traditional, dominated by the Trinity Church located forty metres above it, an architectural jewel from the 11th century, located in the middle of the cemetery.
- Praoli hamlet located just north of the village with the small chapel of Saint-Michel
- Torre, north of the village, which also has a chapel
- Aregno-beach between the seaside resort of Algajola and the industrial area of Corbara. The area has been developed for tourism with the construction of holiday homes, shops, and hotels. The chapel of the Annunziata is at Aregno-beach. The D551 road connecting to the village intersects the N197 at Aregno-beach.

=== Amenities ===
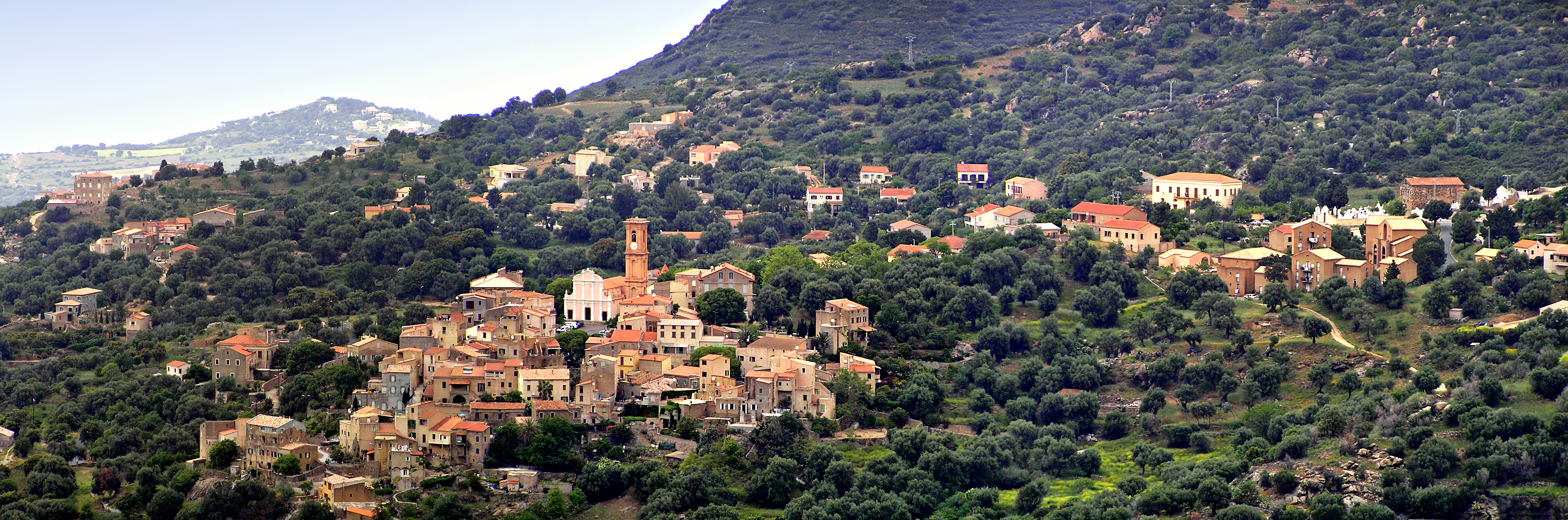
Panorama of Aregno

Although it has a coastline, the commune has no marina. The nearest is the small fishing port of San Damiano in Algajola.

There are 3 water treatment plants: in the village of Aregno and in the hamlets of Praoli and Torre. The pumping station is located near the N197 at Aregno beach.

The commune has no petrol station. The nearest is located at the edge of Corbara commune on the N197 at Aregno-beach.

== History ==
=== Antiquity ===
Evidence that Aregno was already occupied in Roman times has been proven by discoveries of bronze plates from the armies of the emperor Vespasian have been found at the site of San Marcellu.

It has been established that in the 9th century, during the reconquest from the saracens, Roman knights led by the Roman prince Guido Savelli (Count of Balagne since his victory over the Saracens) chose successively the Moorish cities of Corbara (the Castle of Guido was founded in 816), then Sant'Antonino for the capital of the County of Balagna, named after the coastal city which has disappeared.

According to the work of Pierre Savelli de Guido (Count Savelli de Guido, former mayor of Corbara and historian, member of the Archaeological Society of Lorraine), the site is that of the ancient city of Balanea founded by the Phoenicians (?) and mentioned by Ptolemy, Strabo, and Pliny the Elder which was abandoned due to insecurity.

Stones from ancient Roman shrines have been reused in some houses and barns.

=== Modern times ===
In the 16th century, around 1520, Aregnu was the centre of a Pieve with about 500 inhabitants. It was part of the Balagna region which included at the time the pieves of Tuani, Aregnu, Santo Andrea, Pinu, and Olmia.

The Pieve of Aregnu included the following inhabited places: l'Arpagiola (or Gabiola), la Corbaia, lo Monticello, Santo Antonino, Santa Riparata, Piaza, Pragola, le Torre, Regno, li Catari, lo Lavatogio, Lacona, Spano, Hogio, and Aquapessa.

In the 18th century, after the transfer of Corsica to France, Aregnu merged with the pieves of Santo Andrea and Tuani to form the Pieve of Regino. The Pieve of Regino became, with the Revolution in 1790, the Canton of Algajola.

=== Contemporary era ===
In 1954, together with the communes of Algajola, Avapessa, Cateri, Feliceto, Lavatoggio, Muro, Nessa, and Speloncato, Aregno became part of the Canton of Muro.

In 1973 Aregno was integrated into the Canton of Belgodere, a canton created by the forced merger of the former cantons of Muro, Belgodère, and Olmi-Cappella during the administrative division of new cantons between 1971 and 1973.

== Administration ==
List of Successive Mayors

From	To	Name
2001	2014	Claude Imperiali
2014	2020	Jacques Andréani
2020	2026	David Calassa

== Demography ==
The inhabitants of the commune are known as Aregnais or Aregnaises in French.

Historical population

Year	Pop.	±% p.a.
1800	560	—
1821	620	+0.49%
1846	695	+0.46%
1876	683	−0.06%
1901	675	−0.05%
1926	640	−0.21%
1946	537	−0.87%
1962	381	−2.12%
1968	359	−0.99%

Year	Pop.	±% p.a.
1975	490	+4.54%
1982	547	+1.58%
1990	544	−0.07%
1999	567	+0.46%
2007	613	+0.98%
2012	594	−0.63%
2017	598	+0.13%
2023	588	−0.28%

Source: EHESS and INSEE

== Economy ==
=== Agriculture ===
At one time the Almond was cultivated - a tee perfectly suited to Corsica, a dry and sunny region. Olive trees are also grown in elsewhere in Balagne as well as Citrus trees.

- The Orange: In the past the quality of oranges from Aregno was well known. It was in the 17th century that the first oranges were imported from Portugal. There is an orange variety called "Aregno Citrus sinensis Osbeck".

Although today the culture of the Orange has collapsed, 17 January is the day the patronal festival is always held for the blessing of oranges followed by their distribution.

- The Almond: At the end of the 19th century, almond culture covered 3,000 ha of Corsica. By the middle of the 20th century, it covered only 100 hectares.

Since 1970, following the creation of a recovery plan for almonds by the Chamber of Agriculture and the National Committee of the Almond, 300 ha have been planted. Without and prior studies of production, processing and marketing, or technical support, this operation was a failure since in 1980 Corsica numbered only 170 hectares of almond trees. In 1990 a conversion plan funded by the Onhiflor and the EEC was established. 100 ha are to be planted with new plants.

Nevertheless, pastoralism (sheep and goats) remains the main rural activity.

=== Tourism ===
The commune is now part of an area popular with tourists during the summer season. Camping has found its place among the hotels and tourist residences with two large campsites (Camping at the Beach and Marina A) well-developed at Aregno beach on the coastal part of the commune. There is also camping at "Canterattu-city" equestrian centre inland.

== Culture and heritage ==
=== Places ===
Aregno-beach, a strip of 900 metres of coarse sand from which the Citadel of Algajola can be seen. This beach is the natural outlet for all the neighbouring villages. Most of this beach is bordered by the commune of Corbara. The western end belongs to the commune of Algajola. The beach is very popular with vacationers.

=== Religious heritage ===
- The Church of Saint Trinity (11th century) is registered as an historical monument. It is at Aregno village at an altitude of 280 metres, a legacy of the Pisan heritage from the 11th century. As with the Chapel San Raineru at Lunghignano (Montegrosso) and the Romanesque Chapel Saints Paul and Pierre in Lumio, it is located in the middle of a cemetery and is decorated with strange motifs: human figures or animals (bears, cows, snakes etc.). One of these is at Pignon, perpendicular to the front door. It shows a man removing a thorn from his foot. It is an allegory of knowledge, widespread in continental Romanesque buildings. In 2011 an archaeological evaluation was conducted in the nave to consider restoration. There are murals dating to 1449 and 1458 in the Church of the Trinity: The Four Doctors of the Church and Saint Michael slaying the dragon which are registered as an historical object.

Church of Saint Trinity Picture Gallery

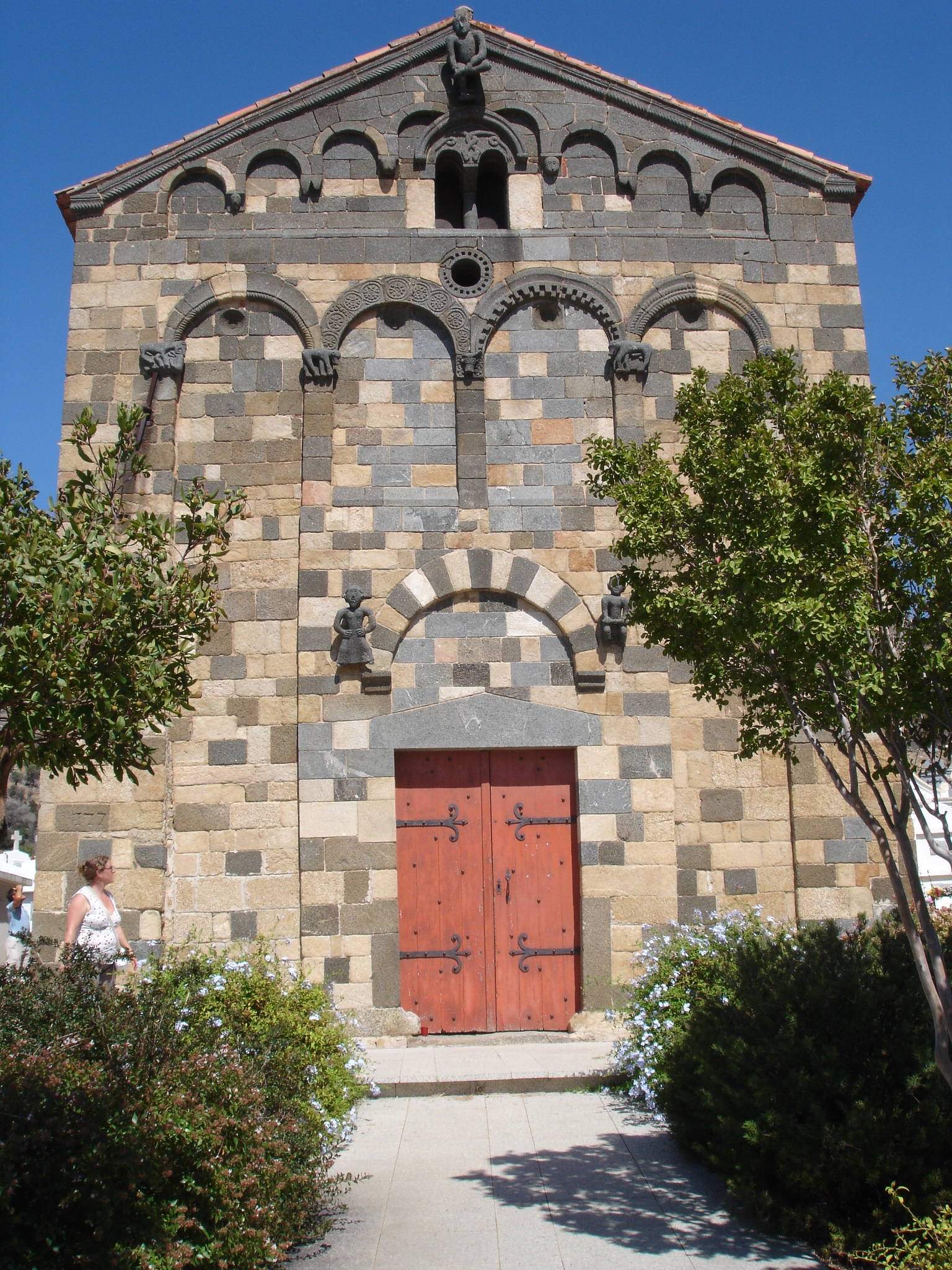
The Church of Saint Trinity

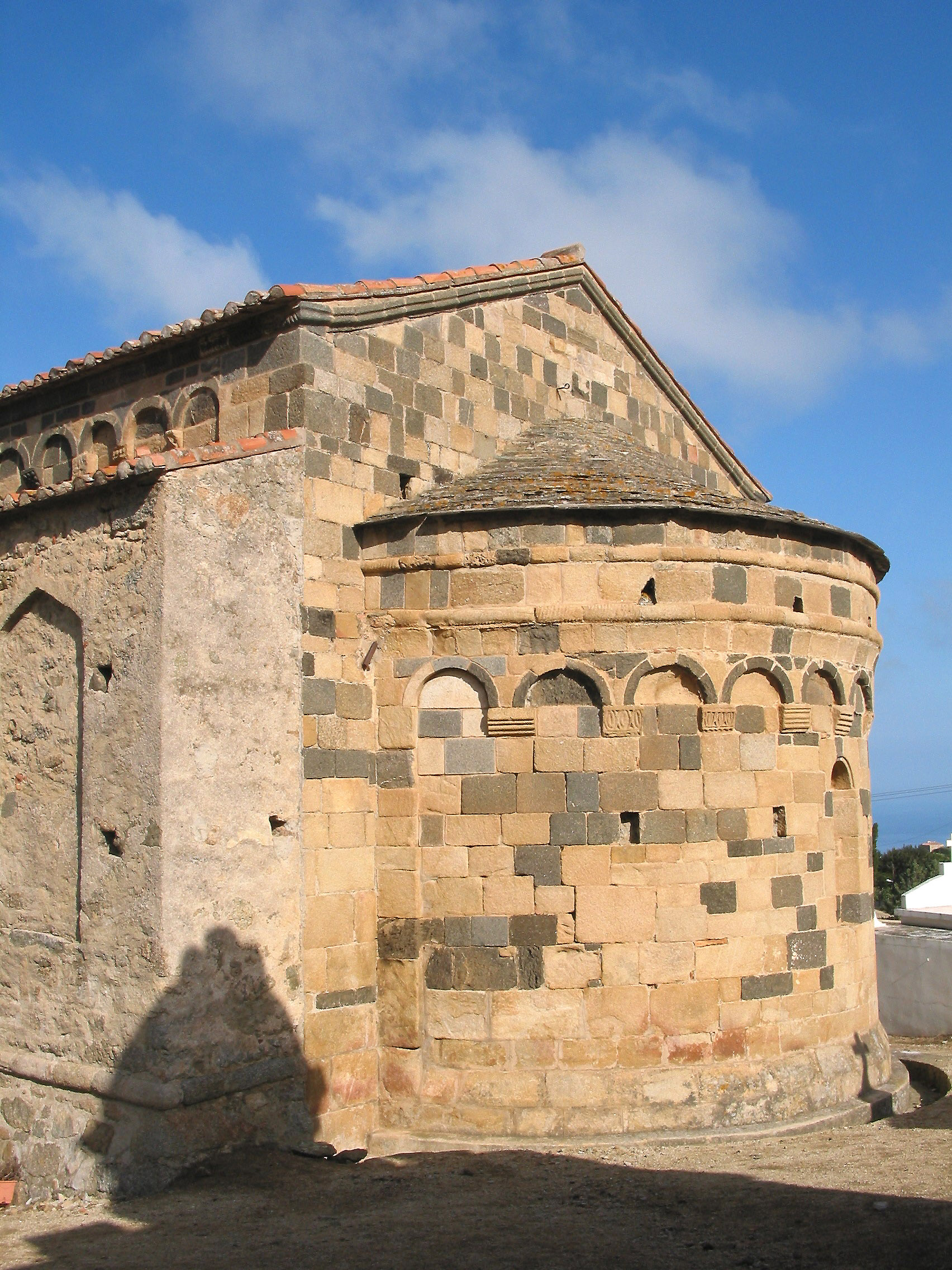
The Apse

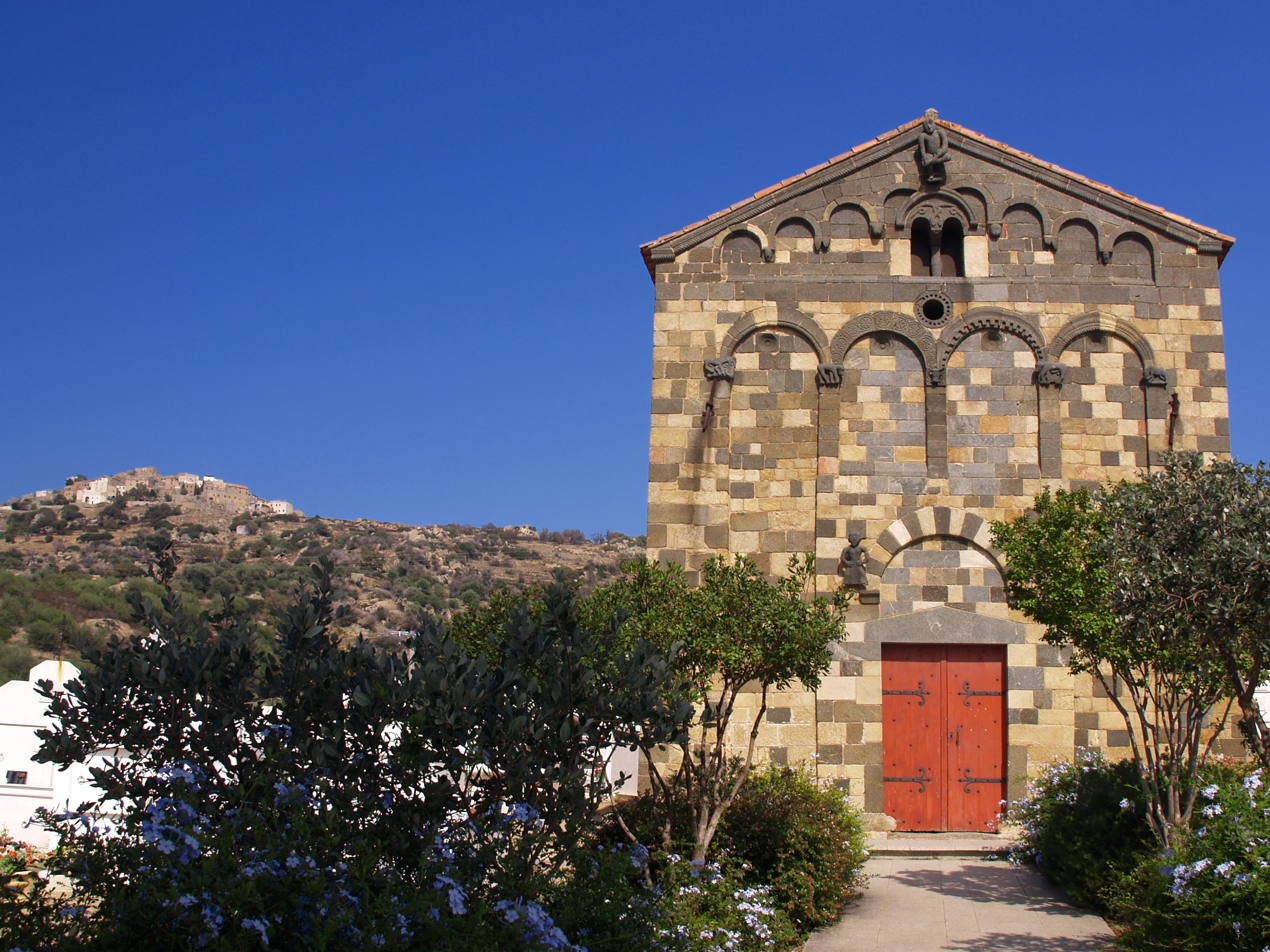
The Church front facade

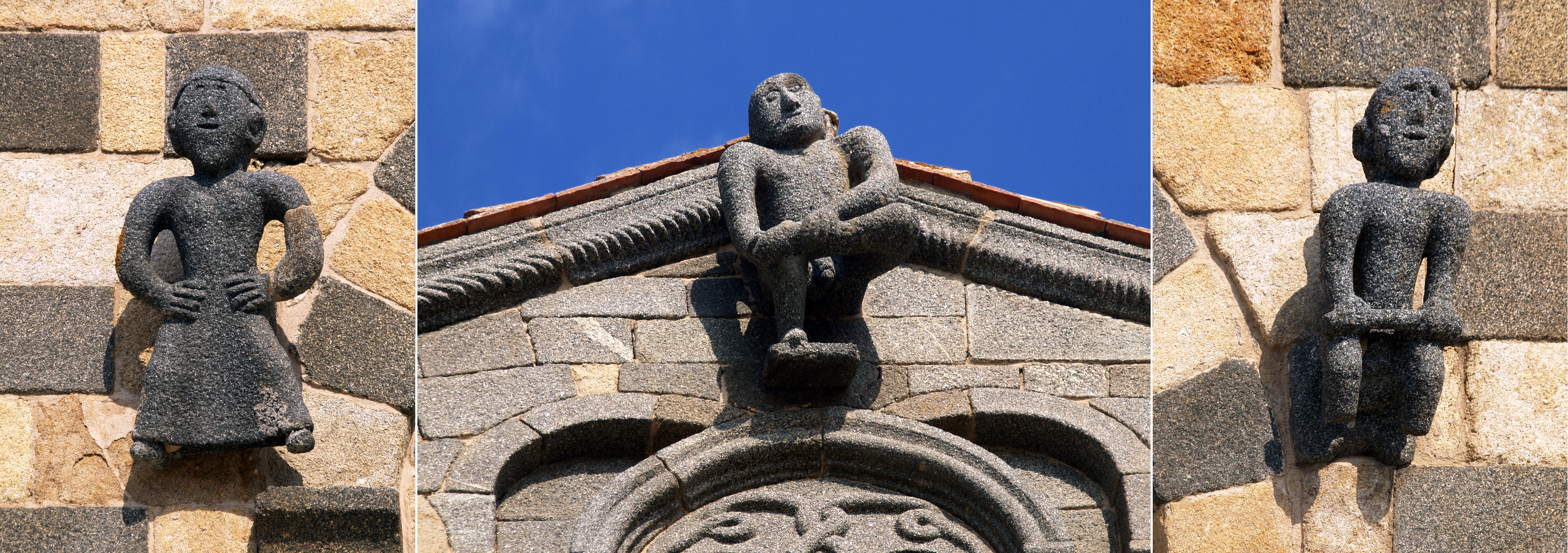
Sculptures at the front
- The Parish Church of Saint-Antoine-Abbé is located below the Church of the Trinity and San Giovanni at 252 m altitude in the heart of the village and accessed by a cul-de-sac. In the style "Corsican baroque" and recently restored, it has a high ochre bell tower and 3 floors of arches. Its front facade, pink with white bands, is inspired by the Church of the Gesù (Rome) with plans having been reworked in 1564 by Vignola. Flat, stripped, and flanked by carved side doors, the facade is divided into two floors, punctuated by pilasters and separated by cornices. It is surmounted by a pediment which, instead of being triangular as in many Baroque churches of the island, here is curved bordered with moulded cornices. The Pediment and facade are also separated by a cornice. The date 1818 is carved on a granite corner stone. Restoration of the church doors has been made financed by a parliamentary reserve in 2011 by the MP for Aisne, Xavier Bertrand. The church contains several items which are registered as historical objects:
  - Friary Stalls (18th century)
  - A Pulpit (1714)
  - A Painting: The Virgin with Saints Dominic and Catherine of Sienna (17th century)
  - A Painting: The Death of Saint Francis-Xavier (18th century)

Parish Church of Saint-Antoine-Abbé Picture Gallery

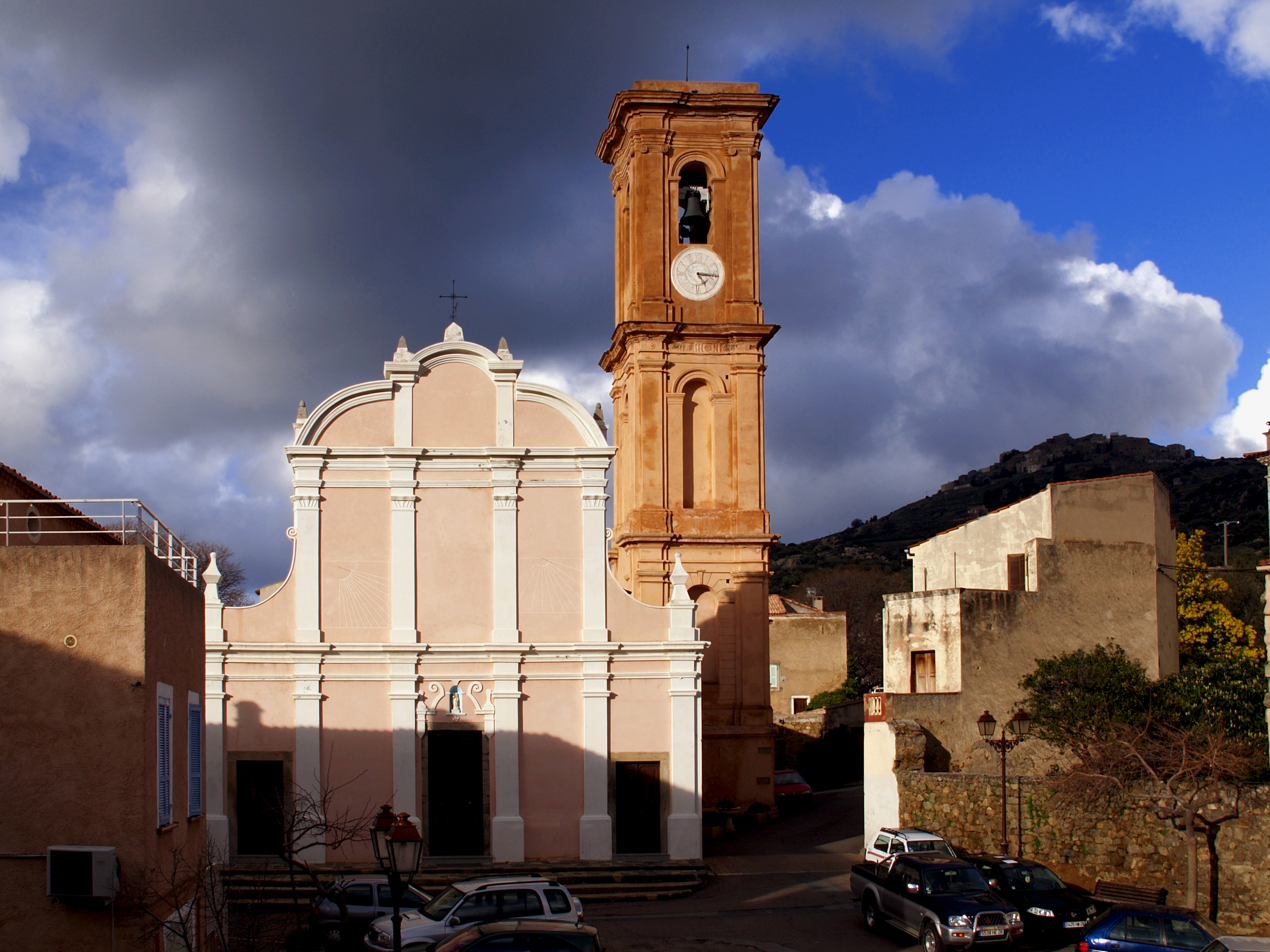
The Church of Saint-Antoine-Abbé

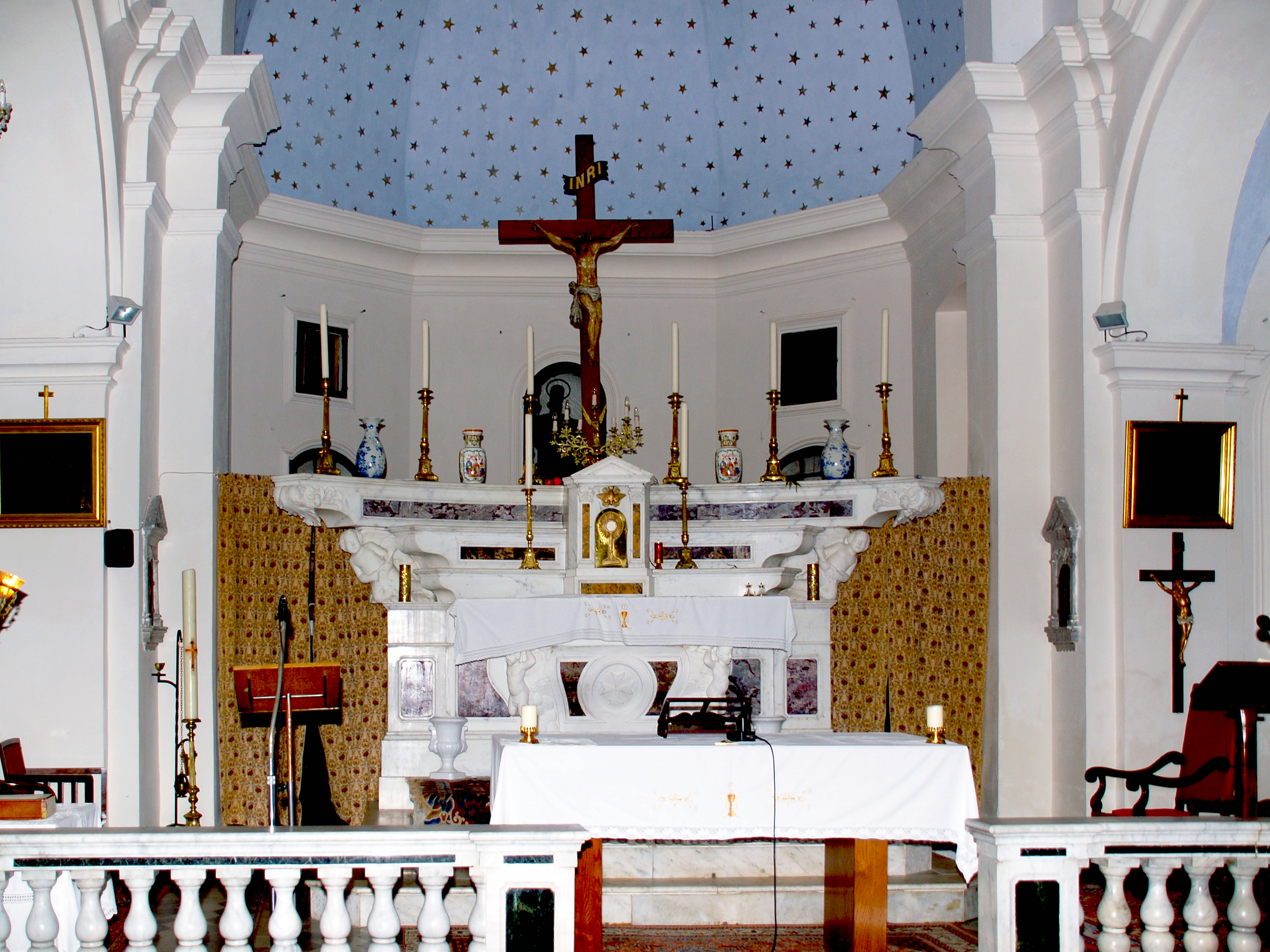
The altar

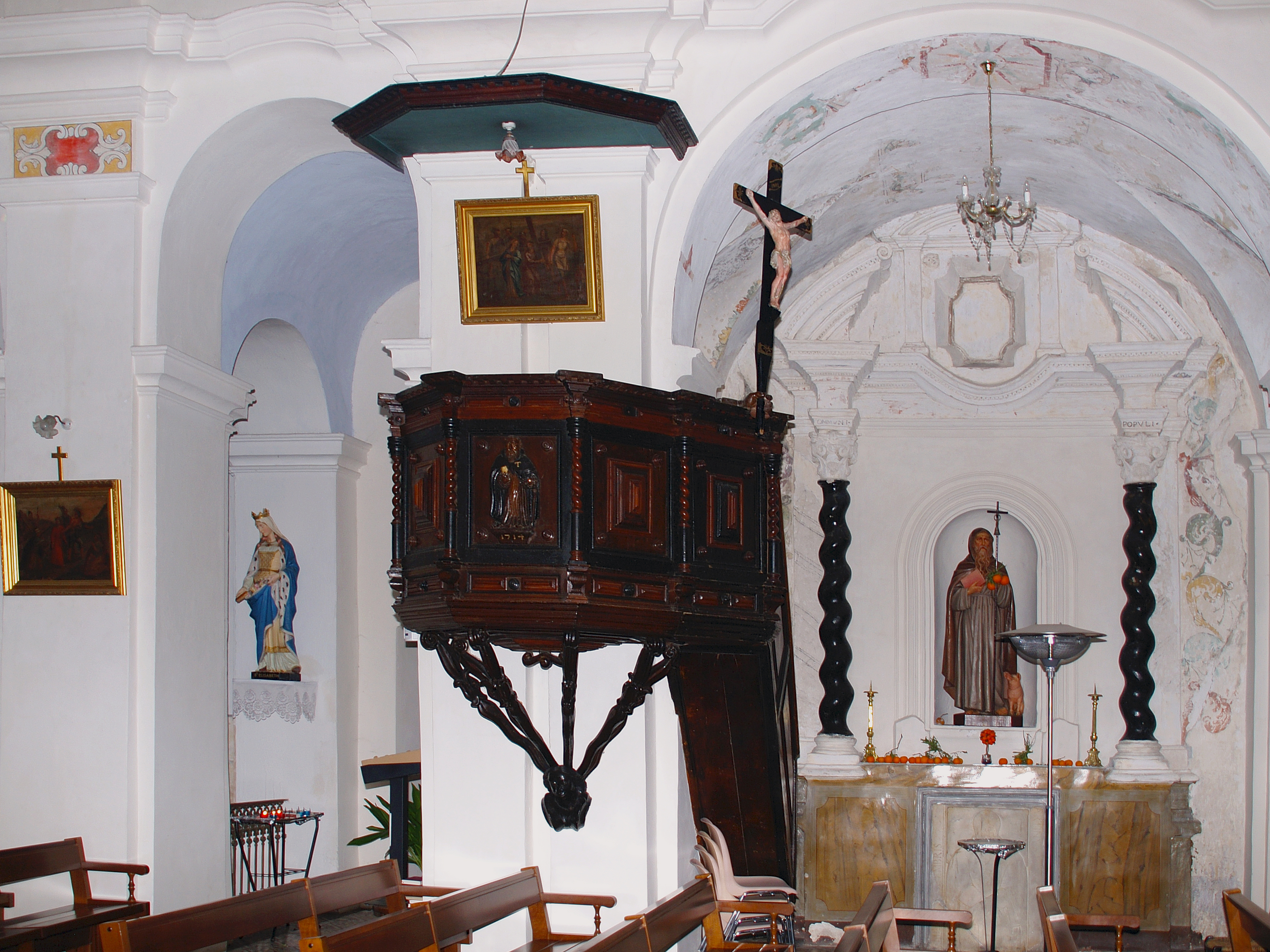
The pulpit

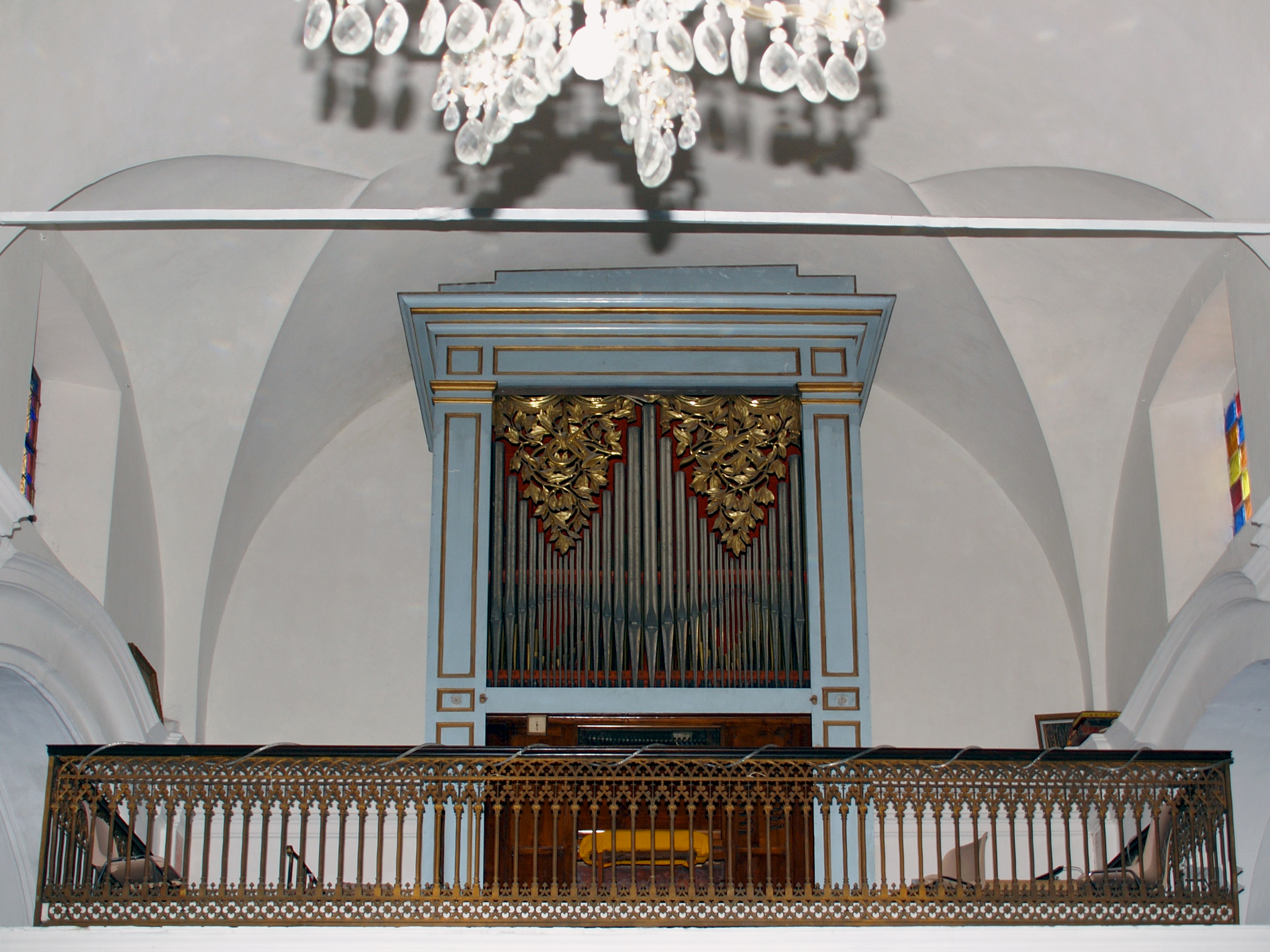
The organ
- The Chapel of Saint-Michel is a small chapel in the hamlet of Torre to the north of the village.
- The Chapel of the Annunziata is on the plain along the D551 road. On a marble plaque affixed above the entrance is written: Fermati o passageri la testa inclina per saluta del celo la grand Regina.
- The Chapel in the hamlet of Praoli.

=== Festivities and Recreation ===
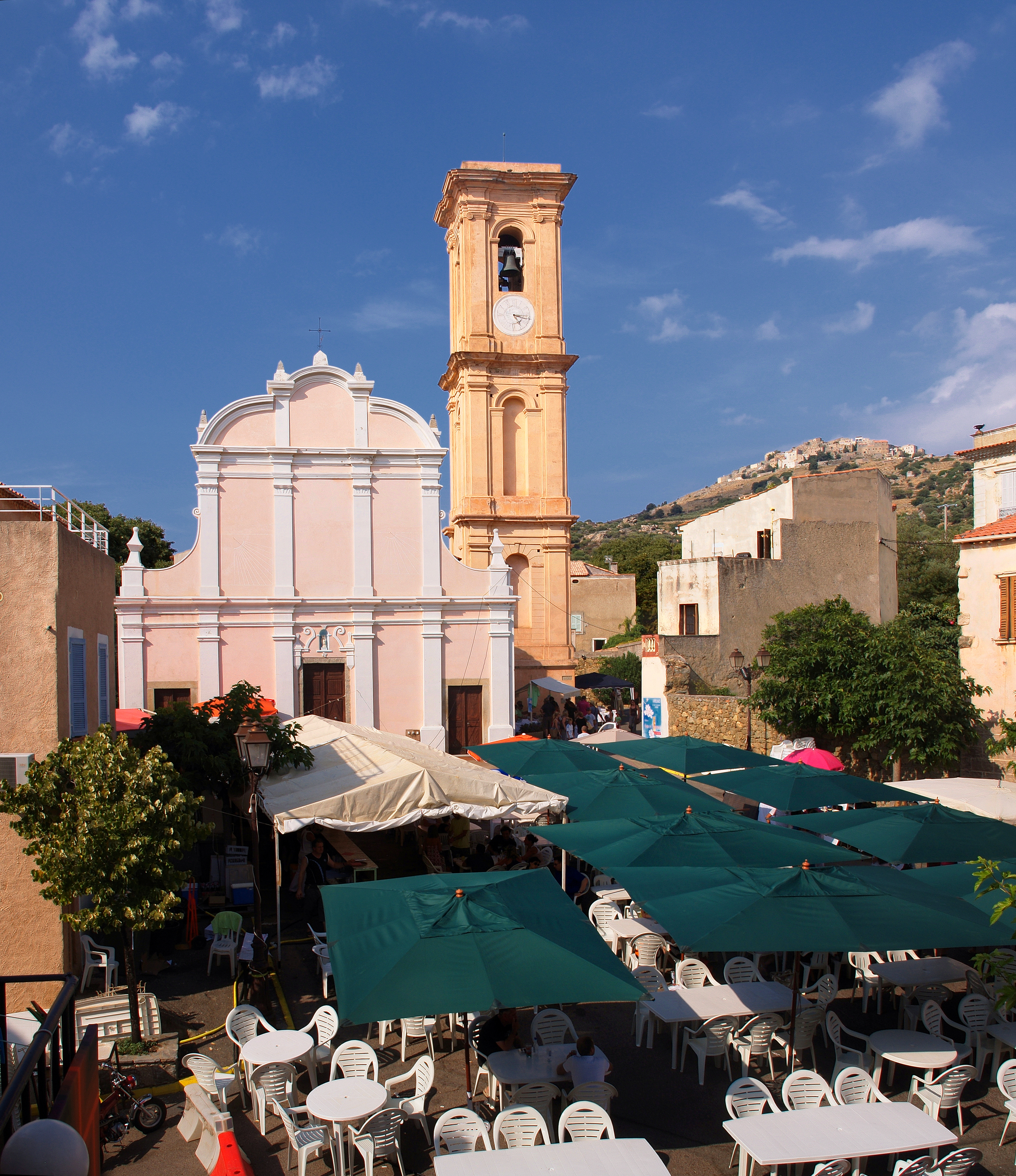
The Almond Fair 2009

- The Almond Fair: On 8 and 9 August 2009 there was the 13th edition of the Fiera di Amandulu at Aregno - a gourmet event focused on the almond and local products (cheeses, meats, etc.) and regional craft stalls. In 2009, exhibitors were invited from the town of Oraison (Alpes-de-Haute-Provence), famous for its almond-based products.
- On 17 January of each year, the day of the feast day of Saint Anthony Abbot, oranges are blessed and distributed to the participants.

=== Aregno Picture Gallery ===
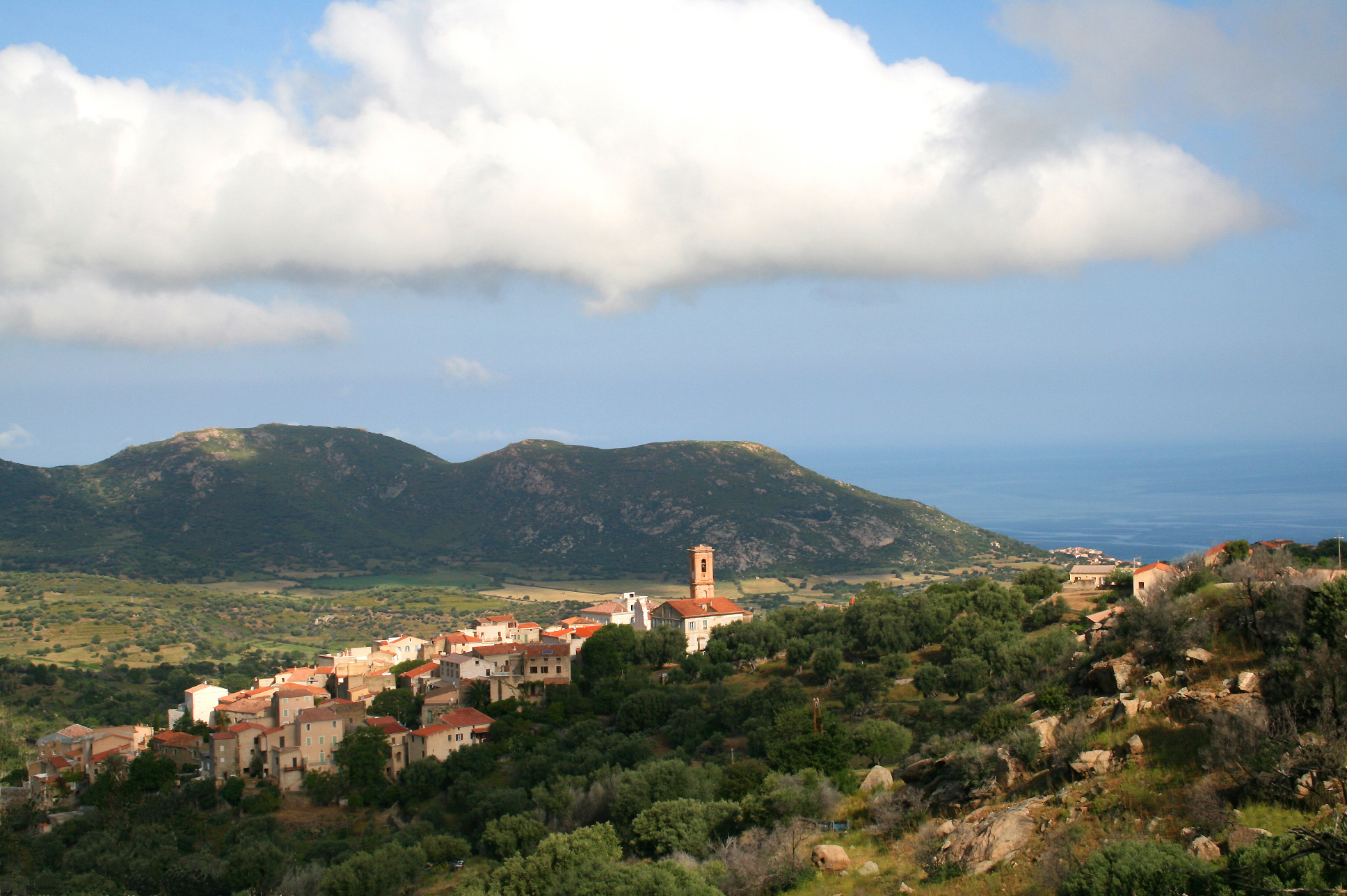
Aregno

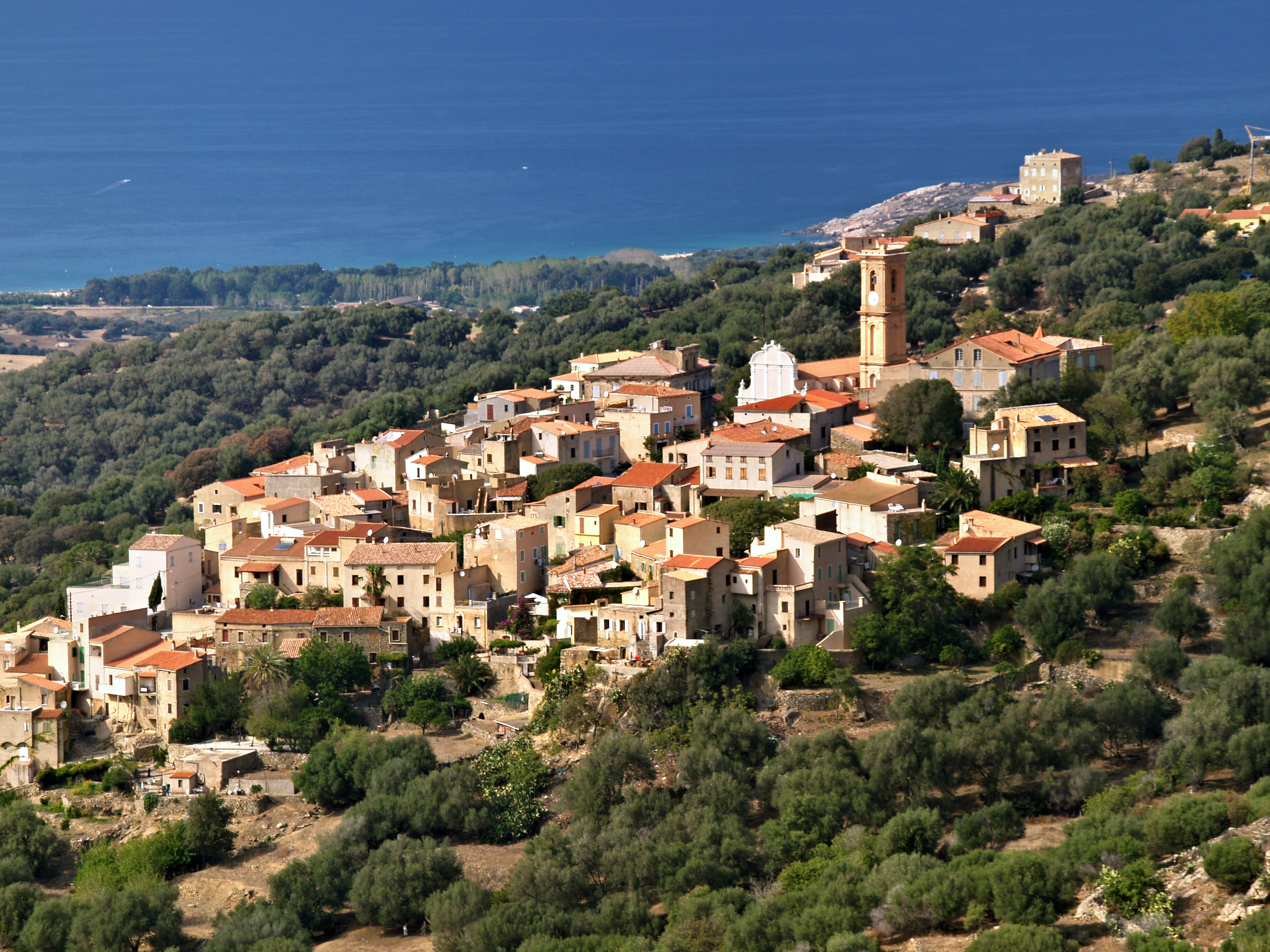
View of the village

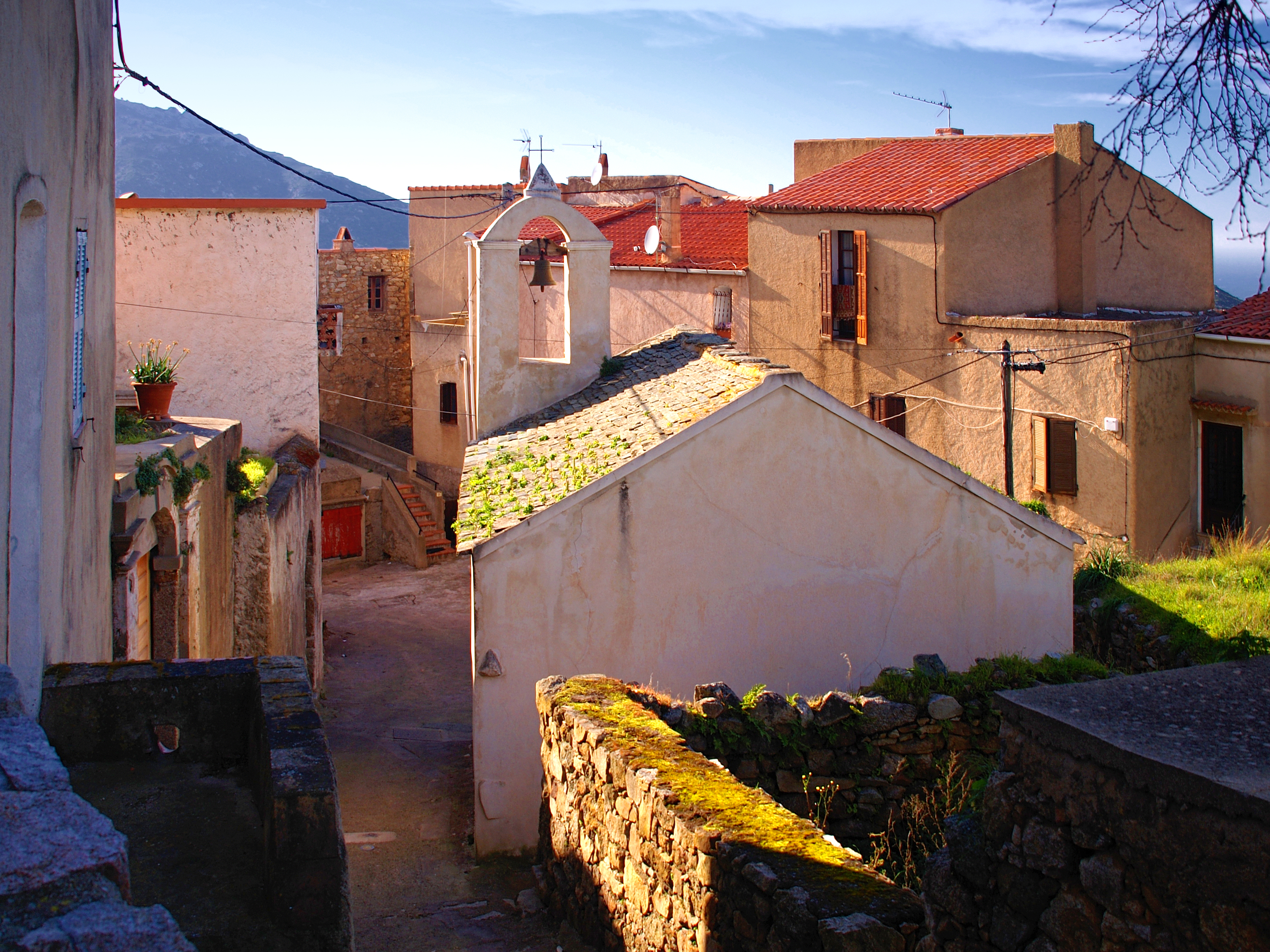
The Chapel of Saint-Michel

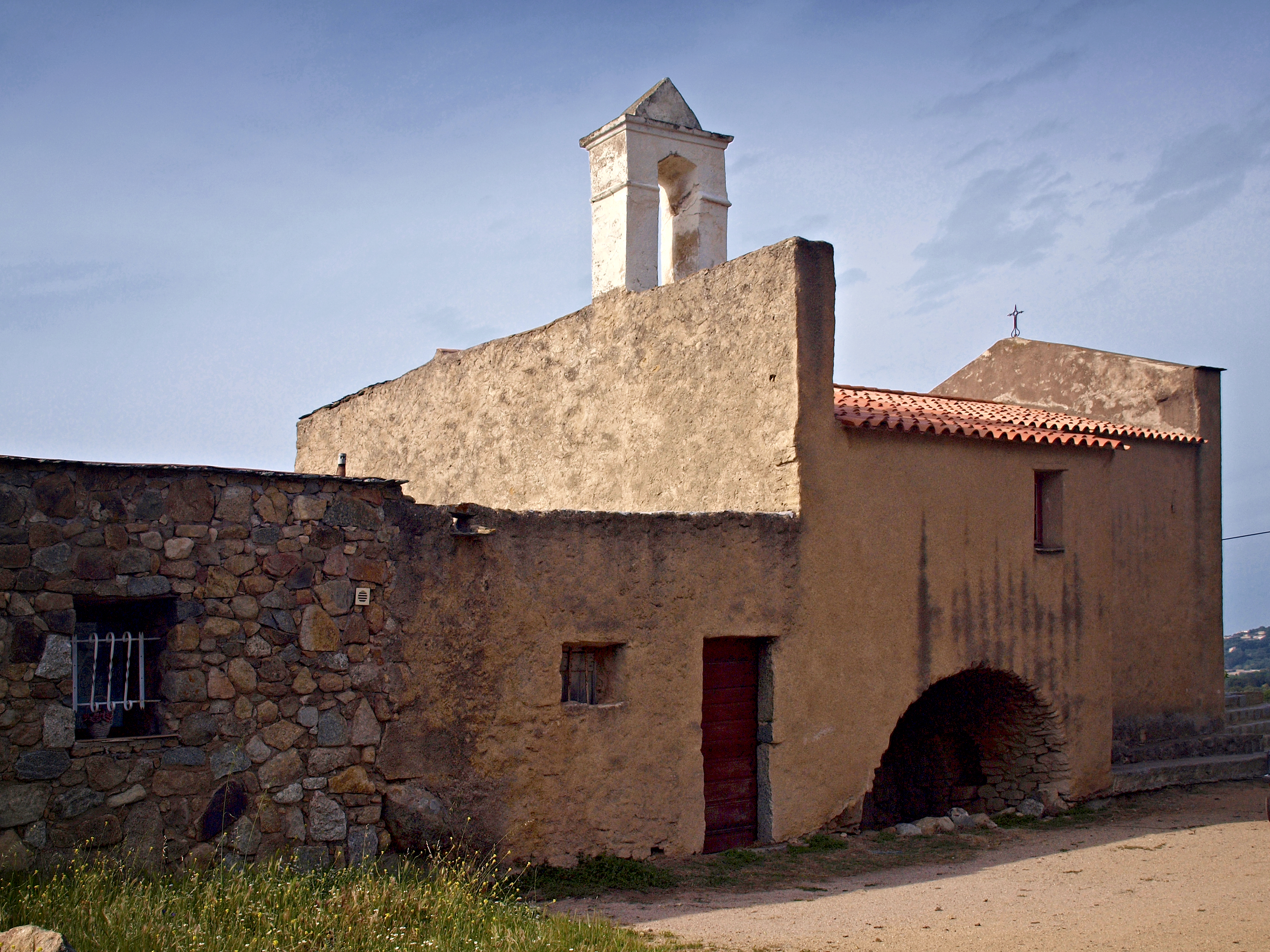
The Chapel of the Annunziata

== See also ==
- Communes of the Haute-Corse department
