= Moncale =

Moncale U Mucale (Corsican)
- Commune
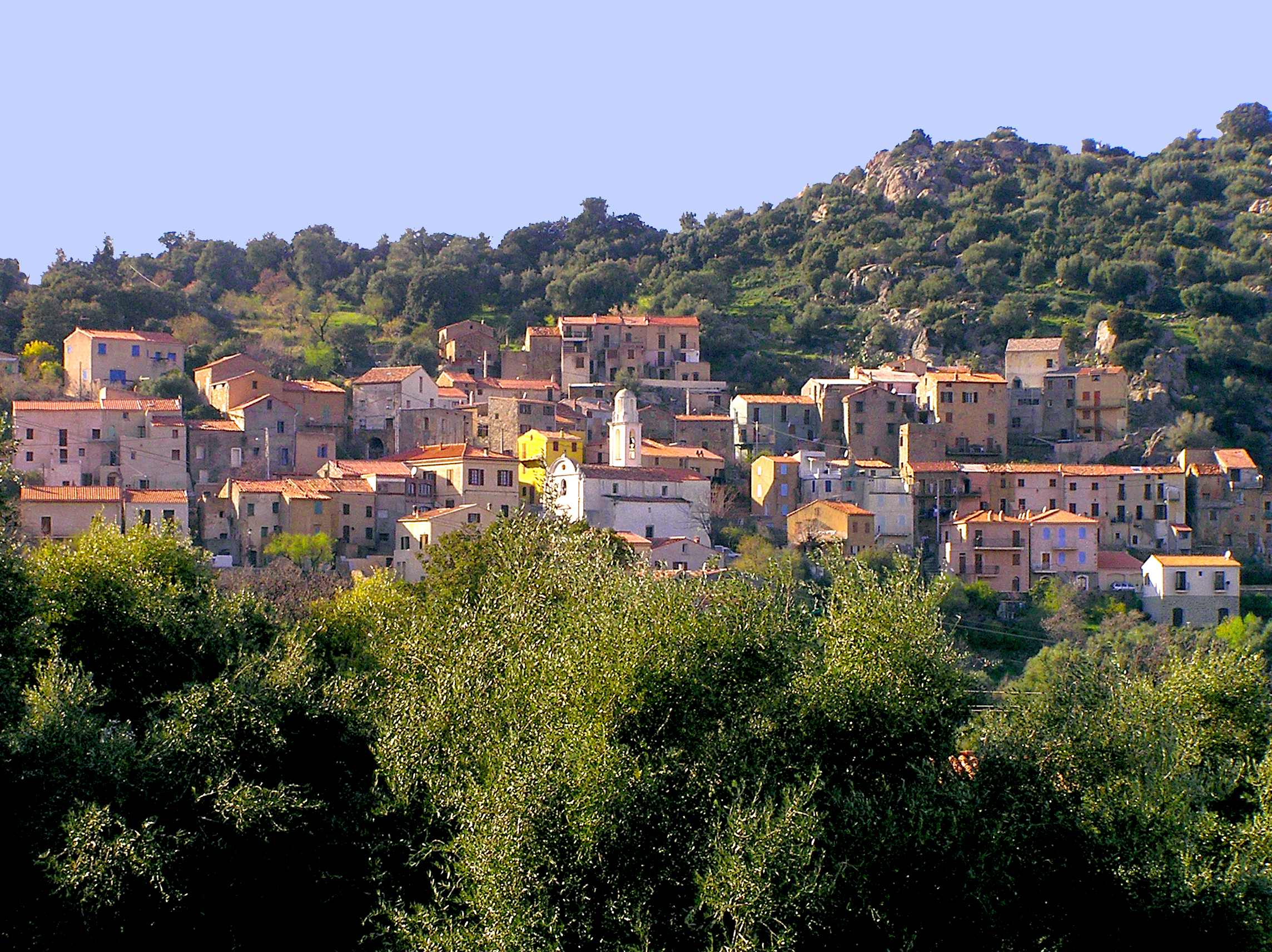
- The church and surrounding buildings in Moncale
- Location of Moncale
- Location within France Location within Corsica
- Coordinates: 42°30′38″N 8°50′10″E
- Country: France
- Region: Corsica
- Department: Haute-Corse
- Arrondissement: Calvi
- Canton: Calvi
- Intercommunality: Calvi Balagne

Government
  - Mayor (2021–2026): Jean-Baptiste Filippi
- Area^{1}: 7.09 km^{2} (2.74 sq mi)
- Elevation: 300 m (980 ft)
- Highest elevation: 522 m (1,713 ft)
- Lowest elevation: 79 m (259 ft)
- Population (2023): 348
  - Density: 49.1/km^{2} (127/sq mi)
- Time zone: UTC+01:00 (CET)
  - Summer (DST): UTC+02:00 (CEST)
- INSEE/Postal code: 2B165 /20214
- ^{1} French Land Register data, which excludes lakes, ponds, glaciers > 1 km^{2} (0.386 sq mi or 247 acres) and river estuaries.

Moncale (Corsican: U Mucale) is a commune in the Haute-Corse department of France on the island of Corsica.

== Population ==
Historical population
Year	Pop.	±% p.a.
1968	131	—
1975	162	+3.08%
1982	176	+1.19%
1990	170	−0.43%
1999	201	+1.88%
2007	237	+2.08%
2012	281	+3.46%
2017	321	+2.70%
2023	348	+1.36%
Source: INSEE

== See also ==
- Communes of the Haute-Corse department
