= Church of Saint Anthony Abbot =

Church located in Aregno, Corsica

Church of Saint Anthony Abbot Église de Sainte Antoine Abbé (in French)
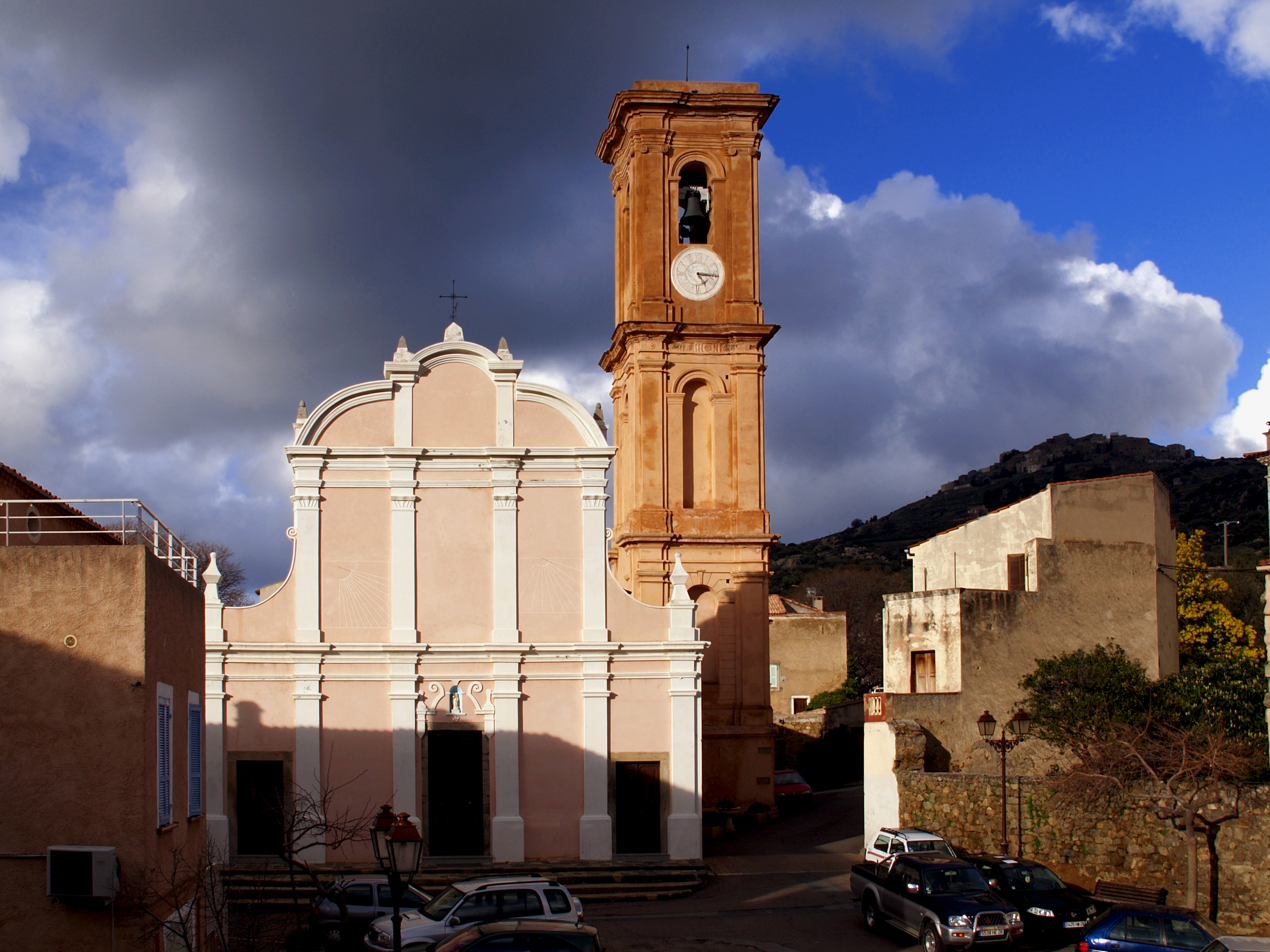
- Church of Saint Anthony Abbot

Religion
- Affiliation: Roman Catholic
- Province: Haute-Corse

Location
- Location: (France) Aregno
- Interactive map of Church of Saint Anthony Abbot; Église de Sainte Antoine Abbé (in French)
- Coordinates: 42.5816°N 8.8946°E

Architecture
- Type: Parish church
- Style: Baroque

The Church of Saint Anthony Abbot (French: Église de Sainte Antoine Abbé) is a Roman Catholic parish church in Aregno, Corsica. The church is about 827 feet (252 meters) above sea level. Some of its inventory (the pulpit and two paintings) was declared a monument historique on February 9, 1995. It is a Baroque-style building and is dedicated to Saint Anthony of Egypt.

== Architecture ==
The church was inspired by the Church of the Gesù in Rome, visible on the church's façade. The church is two floors and is decorated with scattered pilasters and cornices. The entrance is surmounted by a curved pediment, as opposed to a triangular one, which is common in Corsica.

The church is decorated with two paintings on canvas:

- The Death of St. Francis Xavier
- The Madonna of the Rosary with St. Dominic and St. Catherine of Siena

== Festivals ==
- Every January 17, the feast day of Saint Anthony, the town's orange crop is blessed and distributed to participants.
- Every August, the Almond Fair (French: Amande Foire; Corsican: Fiera di Amandulu) is held. It revolves around the town's almond crop and local products (sausage, cheese, etc.), and regional craft stalls are set up. The Fair was first held in 1996.

== Gallery ==
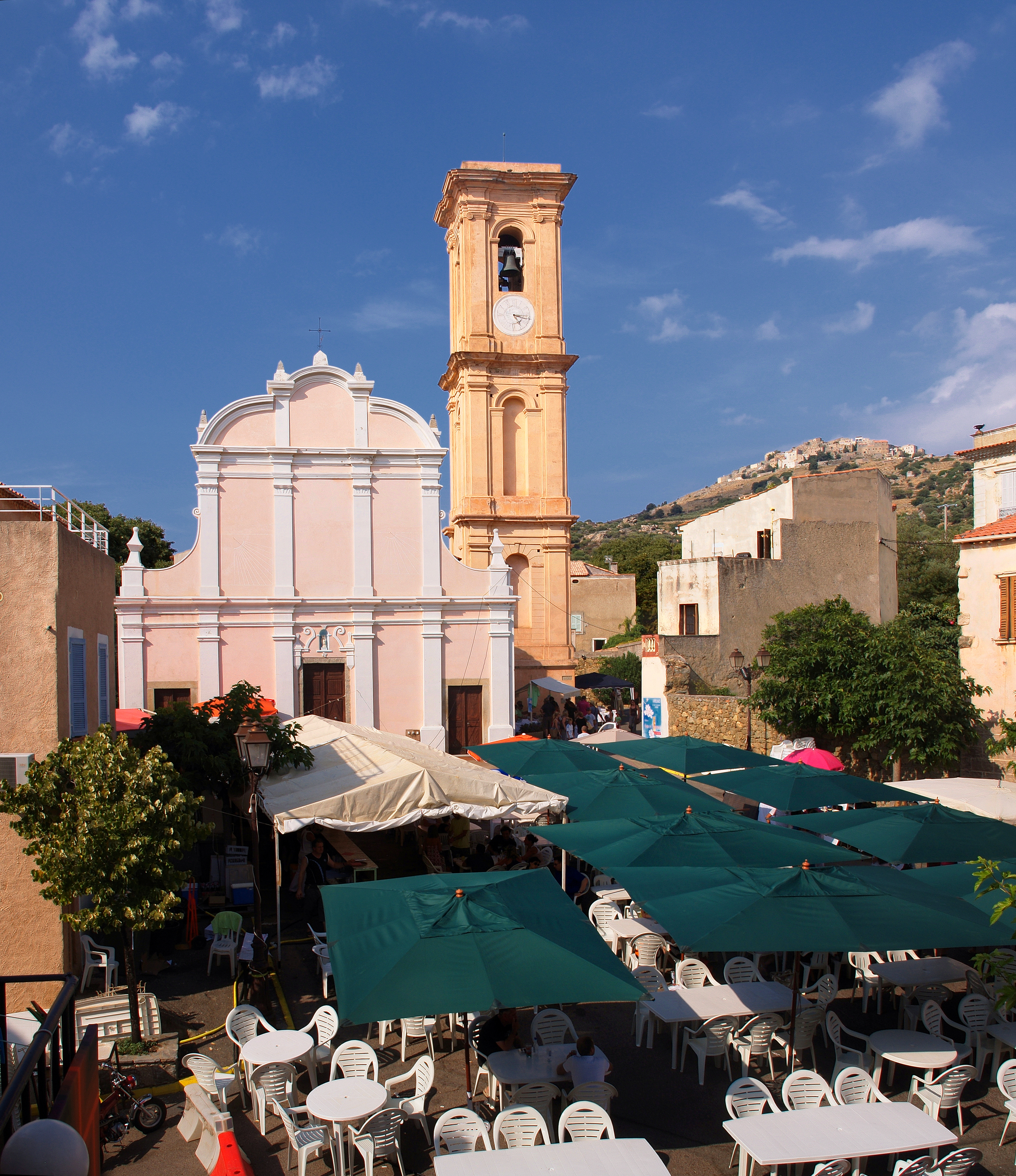
2009 Almond Fair

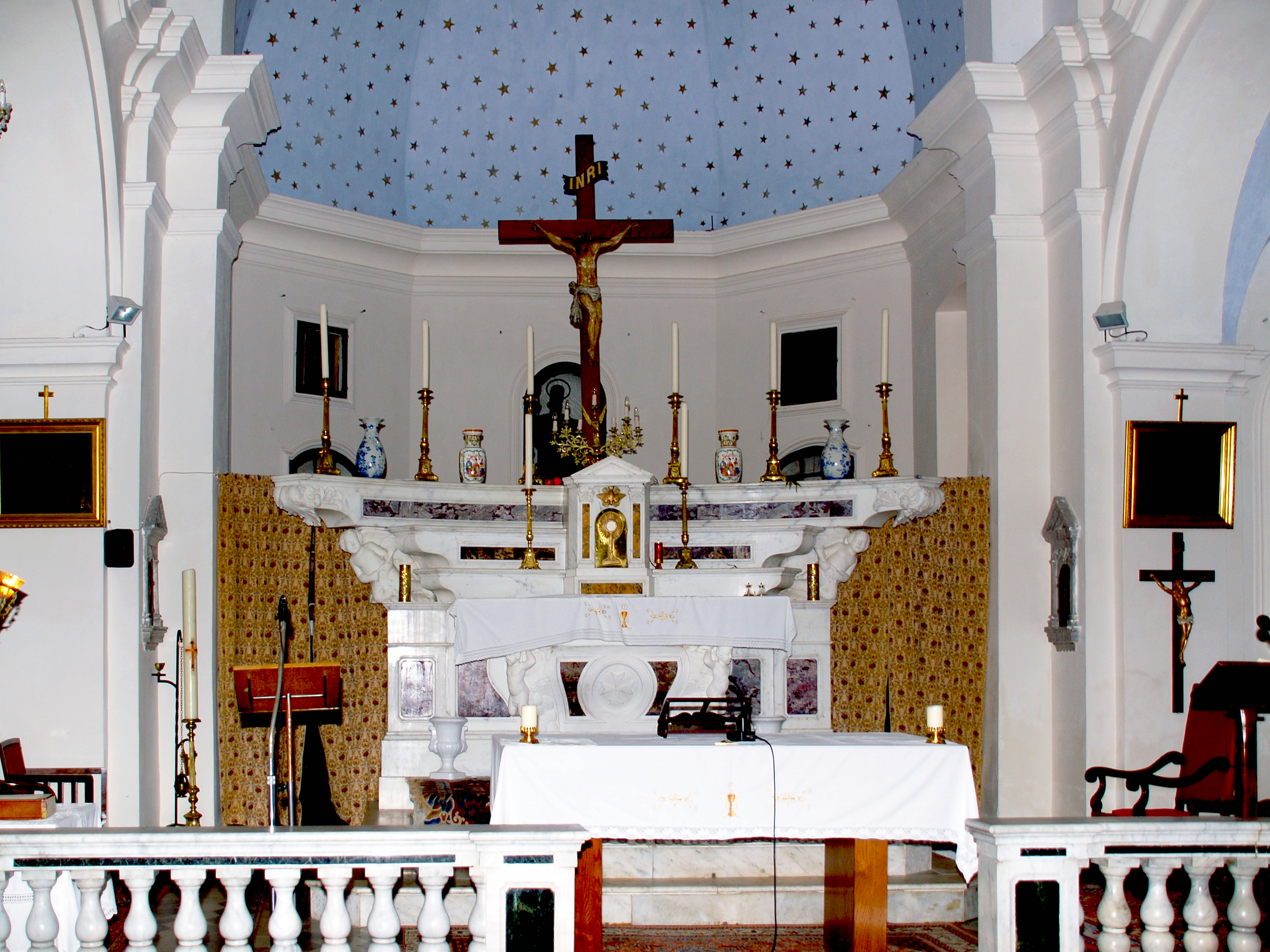
The church's altar

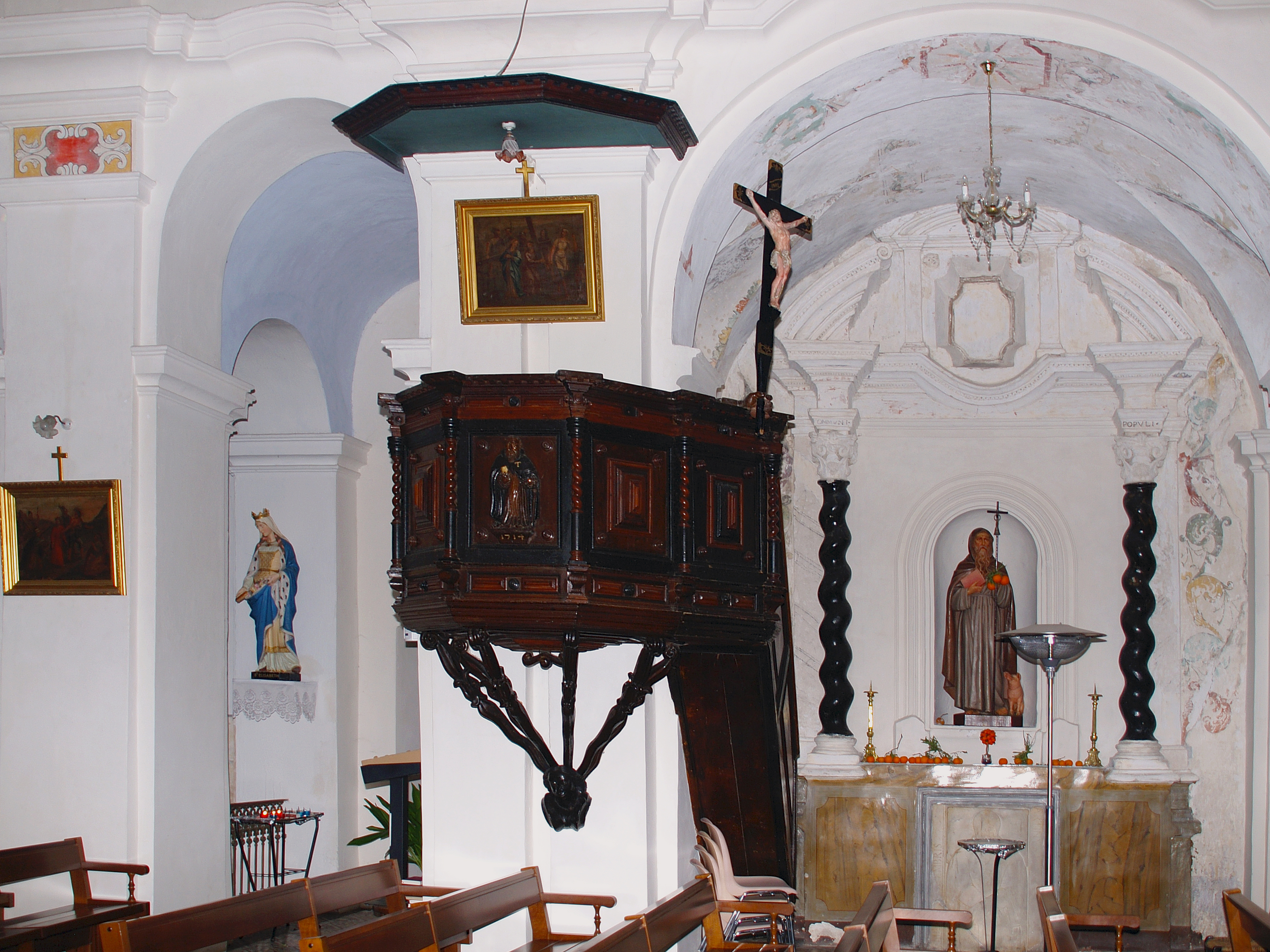
The pulpit

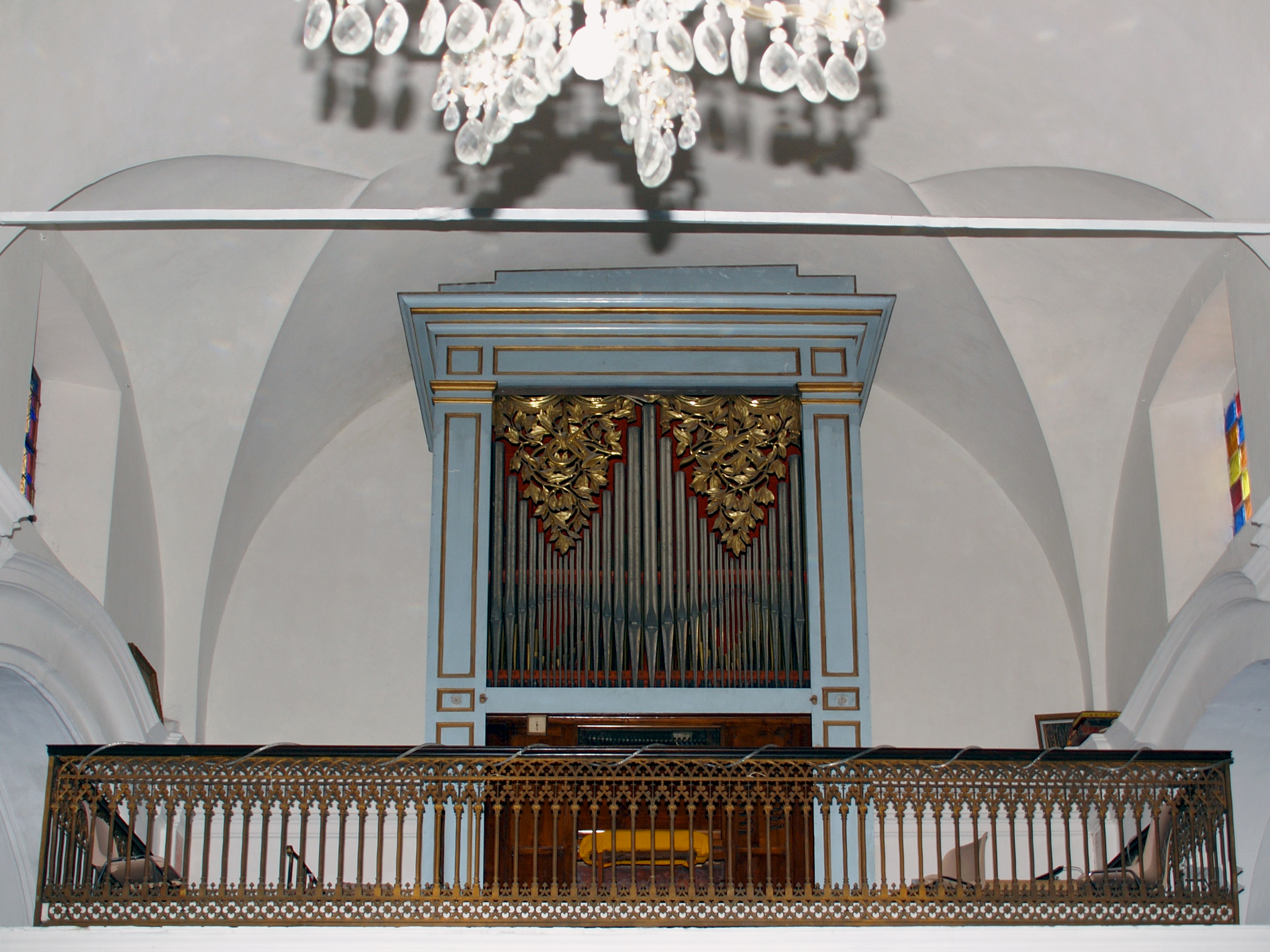
The church's organ
