= Canton of Calvi =

Coordinates: 42.56°N 8.75°E

The canton of Calvi is an administrative division of the Haute-Corse department, southeastern France. Its borders were modified at the French canton reorganisation which came into effect in March 2015. Its seat is in Calvi.

It consists of the following communes:

1. Algajola
2. Aregno
3. Avapessa
4. Calenzana
5. Calvi
6. Cateri
7. Galéria
8. Lavatoggio
9. Lumio
10. Manso
11. Moncale
12. Montegrosso
13. Sant'Antonino
14. Zilia
