= Avapessa =

- Commune
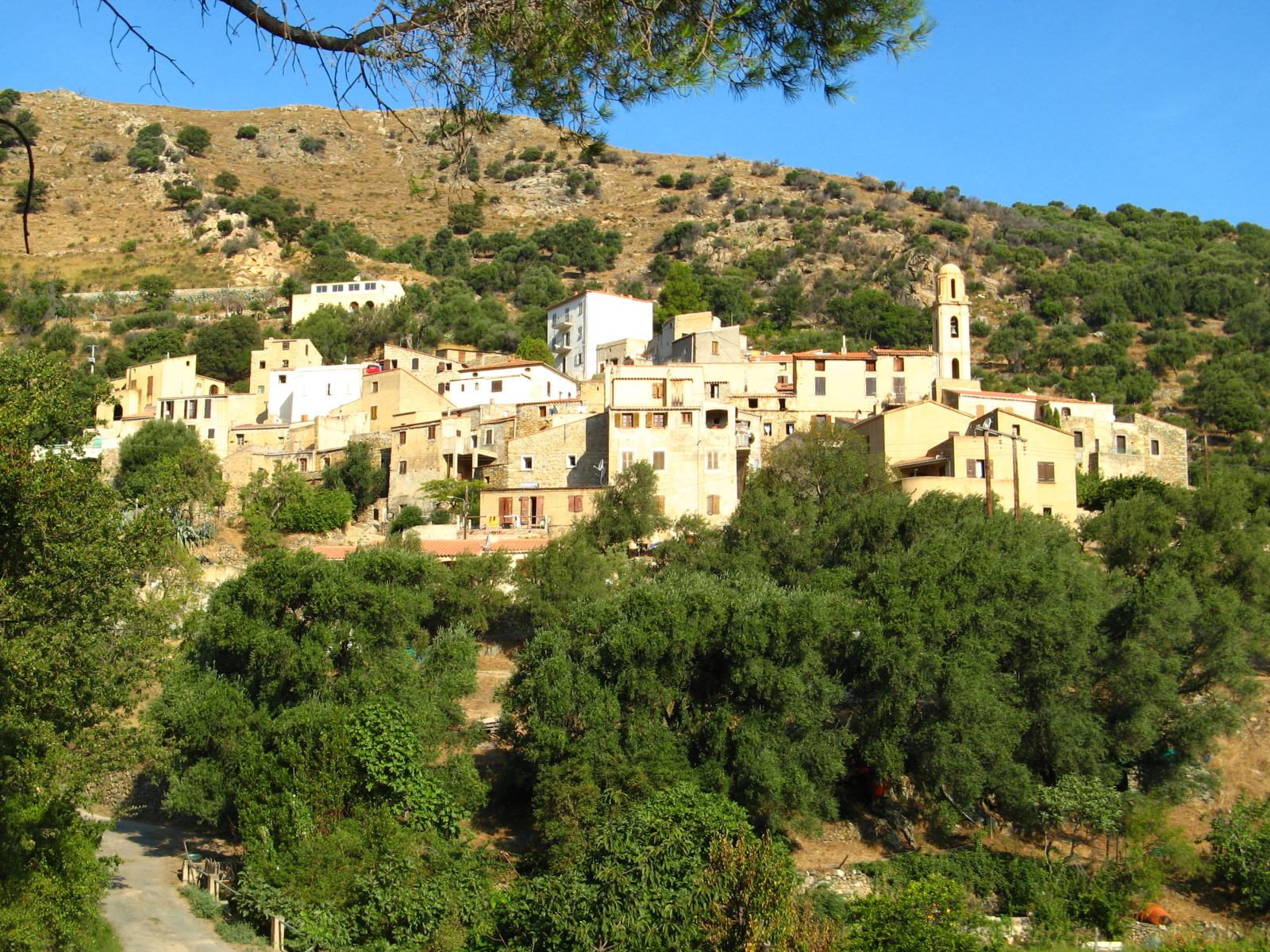
- A general view of Avapessa
- Location of Avapessa
- Location within France Location within Corsica
- Coordinates: 42°33′44″N 8°53′43″E
- Country: France
- Region: Corsica
- Department: Haute-Corse
- Arrondissement: Calvi
- Canton: Calvi
- Intercommunality: CC Calvi Balagne

Government
  - Mayor (2020–2026): Marie-Josée Salvatori
- Area^{1}: 3.29 km^{2} (1.27 sq mi)
- Elevation: 150 m (490 ft)
- Highest elevation: 800 m (2,600 ft)
- Lowest elevation: 173 m (568 ft)
- Population (2023): 80
  - Density: 24/km^{2} (63/sq mi)
- Time zone: UTC+01:00 (CET)
  - Summer (DST): UTC+02:00 (CEST)
- INSEE/Postal code: 2B025 /20225
- ^{1} French Land Register data, which excludes lakes, ponds, glaciers > 1 km^{2} (0.386 sq mi or 247 acres) and river estuaries.

Avapessa is a commune in the Haute-Corse department of France on the island of Corsica.

== Geography ==
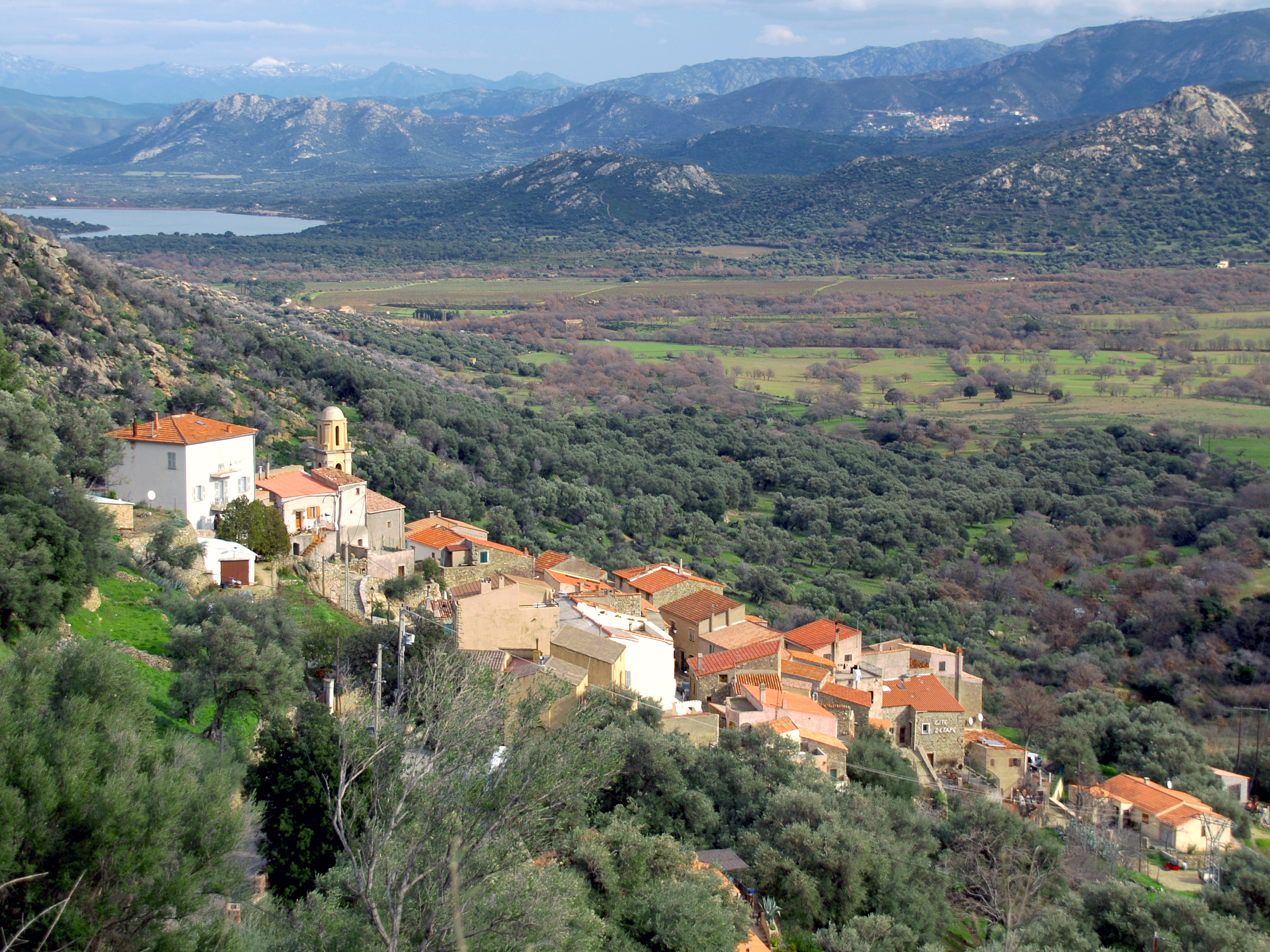
View of the valley

Avapessa is located some 12 km in a direct line east of Calvi and 8 km south by south-east of Algajola. Access to the commune is by road D71 from Cateri in the north which passes through the heart of the commune slightly west of the village and continues south-east to Muro. Access to the village is by the Tuvo road which branches off the D71. The commune is rugged in the west with a high country landscape while in the east there is more farmland.

== Administration ==
List of Successive Mayors

From	To	Name	Party
2001	2008	Christian Reboul	DVD
2008	2026	Marie-Josée Salvatori	DVG

== Demography ==
The inhabitants of the commune are known as Avapessiens or Avapessiennes in French.

Historical population

Year	Pop.	±% p.a.
1800	252	—
1821	246	−0.11%
1846	299	+0.78%
1872	239	−0.86%
1901	210	−0.45%
1926	174	−0.75%
1946	110	−2.27%
1962	107	−0.17%
1968	73	−6.17%

Year	Pop.	±% p.a.
1975	70	−0.60%
1982	57	−2.89%
1990	65	+1.66%
1999	65	+0.00%
2007	81	+2.79%
2012	85	+0.97%
2017	82	−0.72%
2023	80	−0.41%

Source: EHESS and INSEE

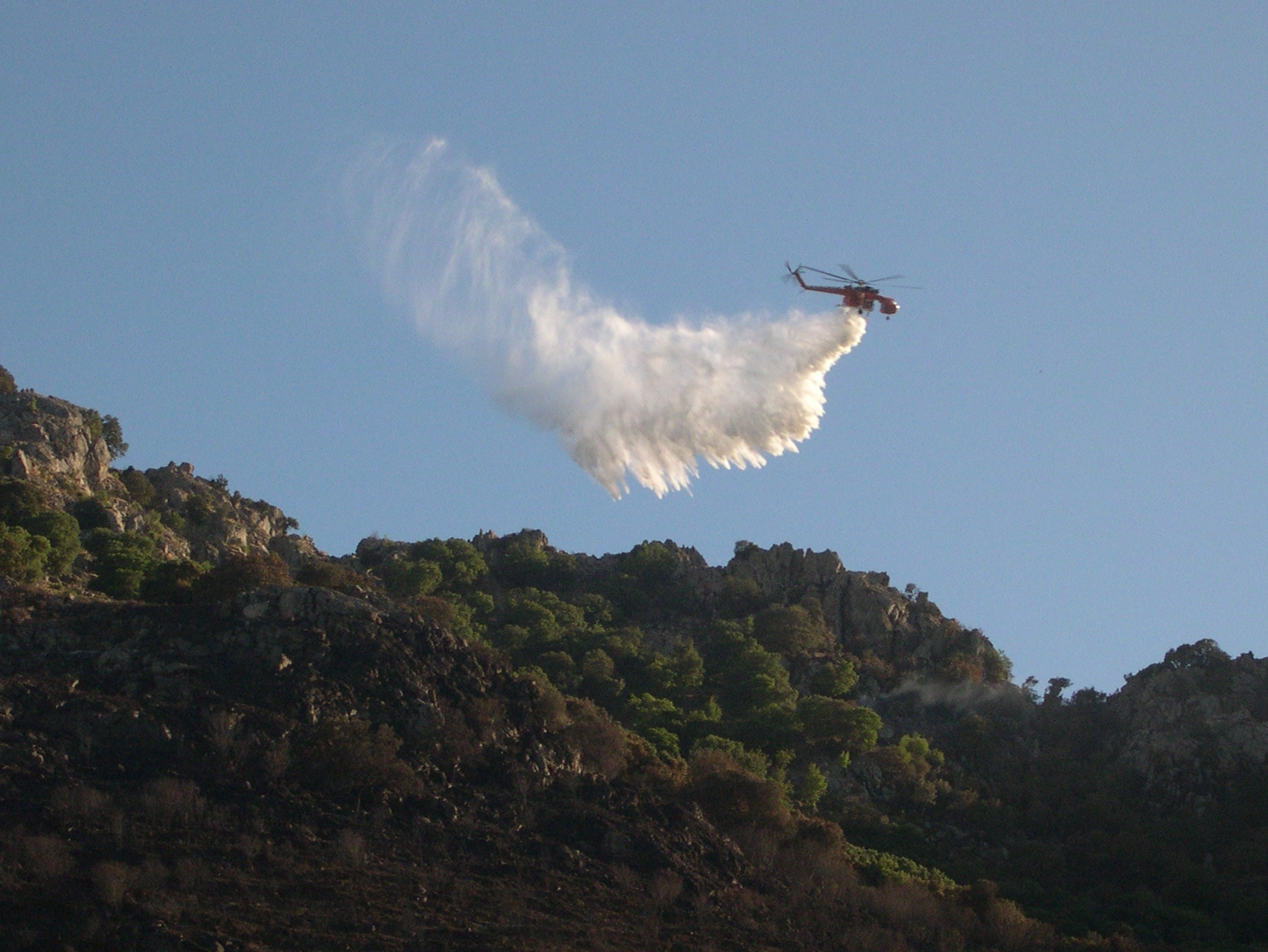
Skycrane fire fighting at Avapessa

== See also ==
- Communes of the Haute-Corse department
