= Zilia =

- Commune
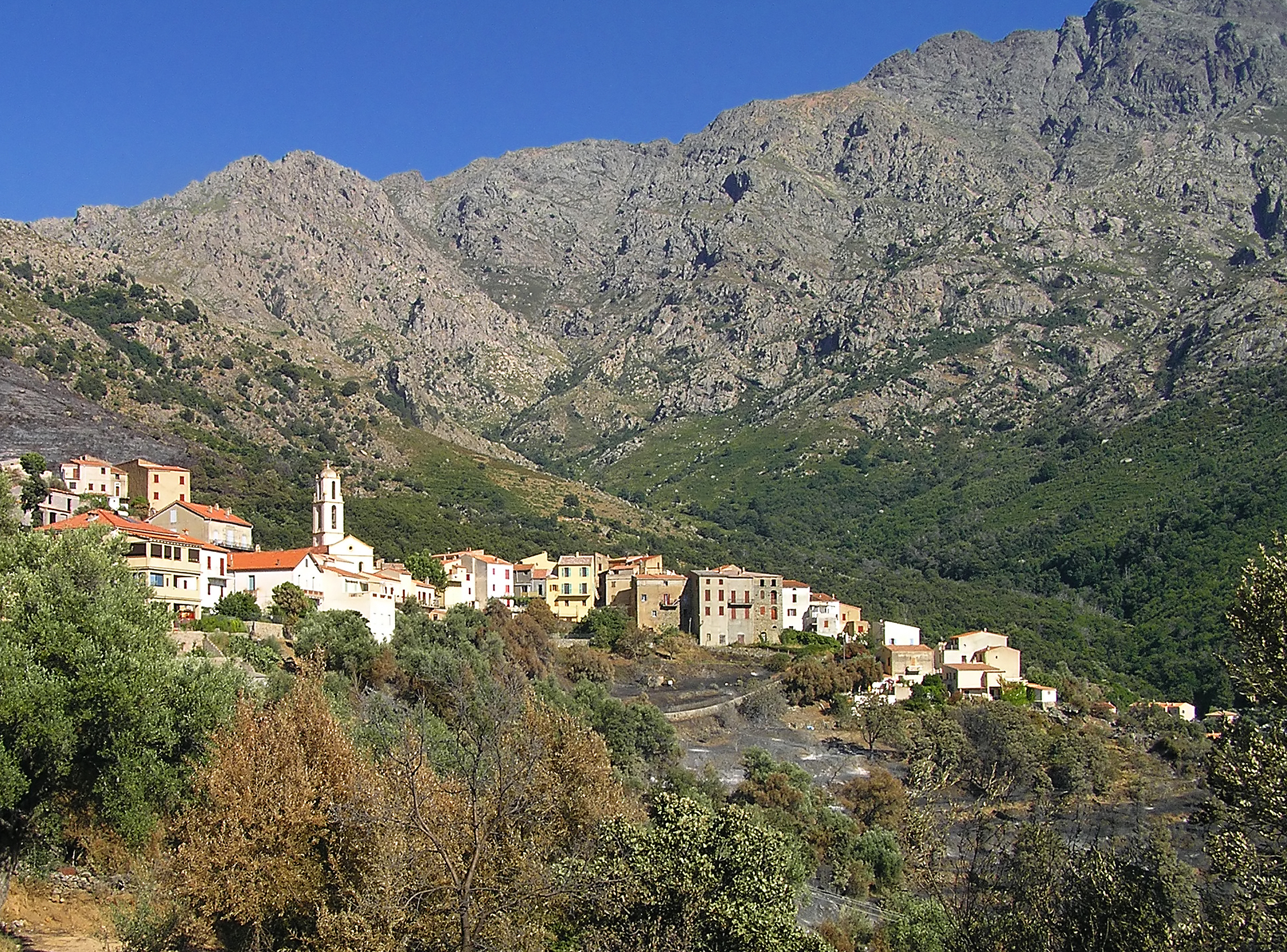
- A general view of Zilia
- Location of Zilia
- Location within France Location within Corsica
- Coordinates: 42°31′52″N 8°54′06″E
- Country: France
- Region: Corsica
- Department: Haute-Corse
- Arrondissement: Calvi
- Canton: Calvi
- Intercommunality: Calvi Balagne

Government
  - Mayor (2020–2026): Jacques Santelli
- Area^{1}: 14.01 km^{2} (5.41 sq mi)
- Elevation: 400 m (1,300 ft)
- Highest elevation: 1,935 m (6,348 ft)
- Lowest elevation: 172 m (564 ft)
- Population (2023): 320
  - Density: 23/km^{2} (59/sq mi)
- Demonym(s): Ziliais, Ziliaises
- Time zone: UTC+01:00 (CET)
  - Summer (DST): UTC+02:00 (CEST)
- INSEE/Postal code: 2B361 /20214
- ^{1} French Land Register data, which excludes lakes, ponds, glaciers > 1 km^{2} (0.386 sq mi or 247 acres) and river estuaries.

Zilia is a commune in the Haute-Corse department of France on the island of Corsica.

== Geography ==
The municipality is part of the canton of Calvi. Its area is 1,401 hectares (3,460 acres) which includes 700 hectares (1,700 acres) of woods. The village itself is situated at an altitude of 278 metres (912 ft) at the foot of the Monte Grosso (1,938 metres or 6,358 feet), 7 kilometres (4.3 mi) north-east of Calvi, the capital.

One road, the D 151, serves the village and links it directly to Calenzana and Montegrosso.

== History ==
Zilia is known for both vineyards as well a mineral spring which was operated before 1914 and again recently. The water sells throughout the island under the name of Zilia bottled water, both flat and carbonated.

The village suffered a huge fire on the night of 31 June 2005 at Calenzana and destroyed 1500ha of vegetation including many old olive trees in Balagne.

== Population ==
Historical population

Year	Pop.	±% p.a.
1800	552	—
1806	613	+1.76%
1821	580	−0.37%
1831	611	+0.52%
1836	657	+1.46%
1841	692	+1.04%
1846	721	+0.82%
1851	745	+0.66%
1856	676	−1.93%
1861	688	+0.35%
1866	702	+0.40%
1872	687	−0.36%
1876	704	+0.61%
1881	762	+1.60%
1886	701	−1.65%
1891	730	+0.81%
1896	731	+0.03%
1901	746	+0.41%

Year	Pop.	±% p.a.
1906	714	−0.87%
1911	531	−5.75%
1921	471	−1.19%
1926	515	+1.80%
1931	514	−0.04%
1936	505	−0.35%
1946	508	+0.06%
1954	311	−5.95%
1962	320	+0.36%
1968	311	−0.47%
1975	253	−2.91%
1982	237	−0.93%
1990	179	−3.45%
1999	212	+1.90%
2007	227	+0.86%
2012	293	+5.24%
2017	286	−0.48%
2023	320	+1.89%

Source: EHESS (1793-1999) and INSEE

== See also ==
- Communes of the Haute-Corse department
