= Lavatoggio =

- Commune
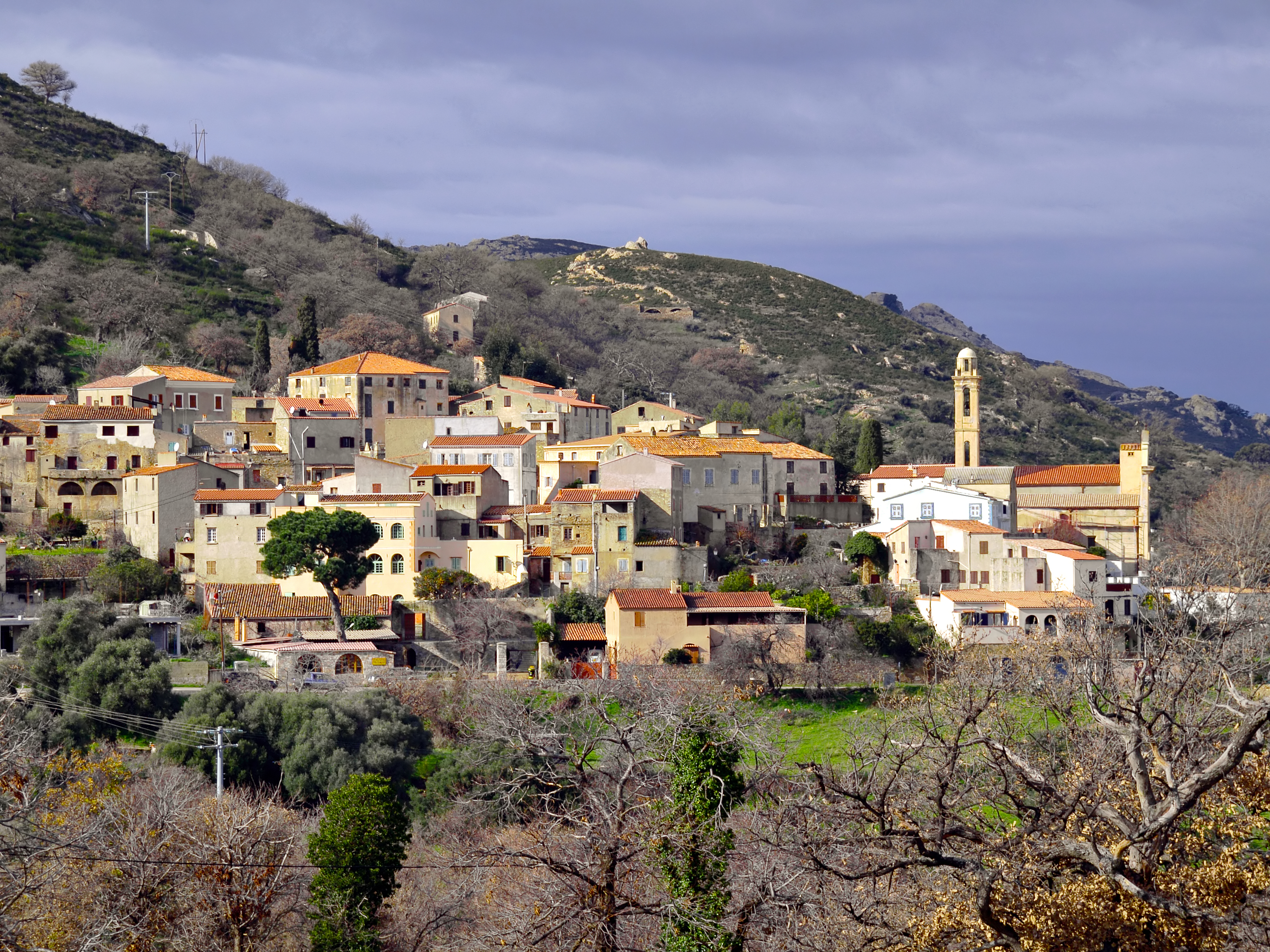
- A view of Lavatoggio village
- Location of Lavatoggio
- Location within France Location within Corsica
- Coordinates: 42°34′29″N 8°52′42″E
- Country: France
- Region: Corsica
- Department: Haute-Corse
- Arrondissement: Calvi
- Canton: Calvi
- Intercommunality: Calvi Balagne

Government
  - Mayor (2020–2026): François Croce
- Area^{1}: 6.86 km^{2} (2.65 sq mi)
- Elevation: 260 m (850 ft)
- Highest elevation: 689 m (2,260 ft)
- Lowest elevation: 160 m (520 ft)
- Population (2023): 154
  - Density: 22.4/km^{2} (58.1/sq mi)
- Time zone: UTC+01:00 (CET)
  - Summer (DST): UTC+02:00 (CEST)
- INSEE/Postal code: 2B138 /20225
- ^{1} French Land Register data, which excludes lakes, ponds, glaciers > 1 km^{2} (0.386 sq mi or 247 acres) and river estuaries.

Lavatoggio is a commune in the Haute-Corse department of France on the island of Corsica.

== Population ==
Historical population
Year	Pop.	±% p.a.
1968	89	—
1975	107	+2.67%
1982	116	+1.16%
1990	138	+2.19%
1999	97	−3.84%
2007	137	+4.41%
2012	142	+0.72%
2017	150	+1.10%
2023	154	+0.44%
Source: INSEE

== See also ==
- Communes of the Haute-Corse department
