= Cateri =

- Commune
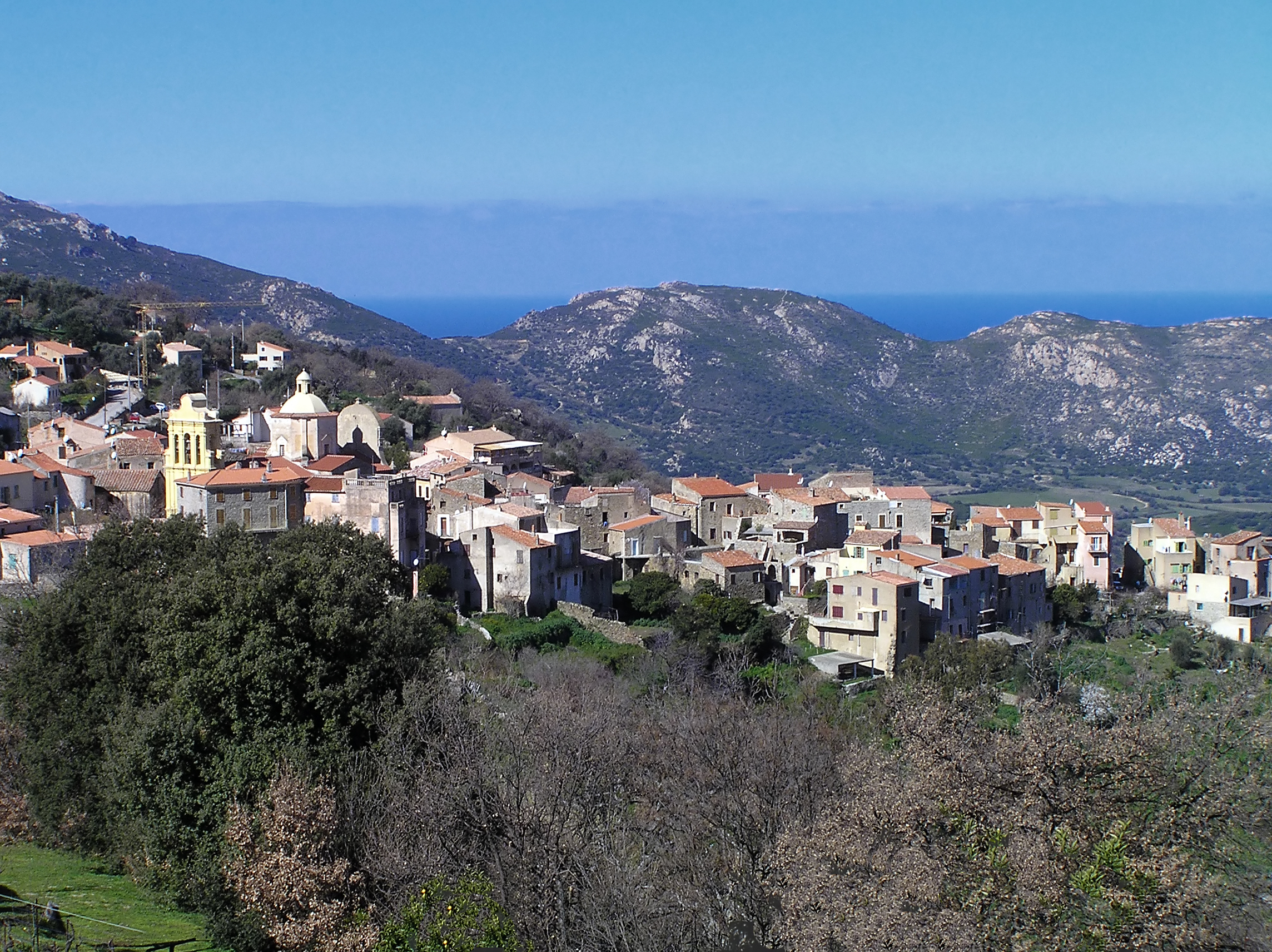
- The village of Cateri
- Location of Cateri
- Location within France Location within Corsica
- Coordinates: 42°34′21″N 8°53′33″E
- Country: France
- Region: Corsica
- Department: Haute-Corse
- Arrondissement: Calvi
- Canton: Calvi
- Intercommunality: Calvi Balagne

Government
  - Mayor (2020–2026): Dominique Andréani
- Area^{1}: 3.18 km^{2} (1.23 sq mi)
- Elevation: 300 m (980 ft)
- Highest elevation: 732 m (2,402 ft)
- Lowest elevation: 157 m (515 ft)
- Population (2023): 247
  - Density: 77.7/km^{2} (201/sq mi)
- Time zone: UTC+01:00 (CET)
  - Summer (DST): UTC+02:00 (CEST)
- INSEE/Postal code: 2B084 /20225
- ^{1} French Land Register data, which excludes lakes, ponds, glaciers > 1 km^{2} (0.386 sq mi or 247 acres) and river estuaries.

Cateri is a commune in the Haute-Corse department of France on the island of Corsica.

== Population ==
Historical population
Year	Pop.	±% p.a.
1968	184	—
1975	191	+0.53%
1982	251	+3.98%
1990	210	−2.20%
1999	219	+0.47%
2007	209	−0.58%
2012	233	+2.20%
2017	215	−1.60%
2023	247	+2.34%
Source: INSEE

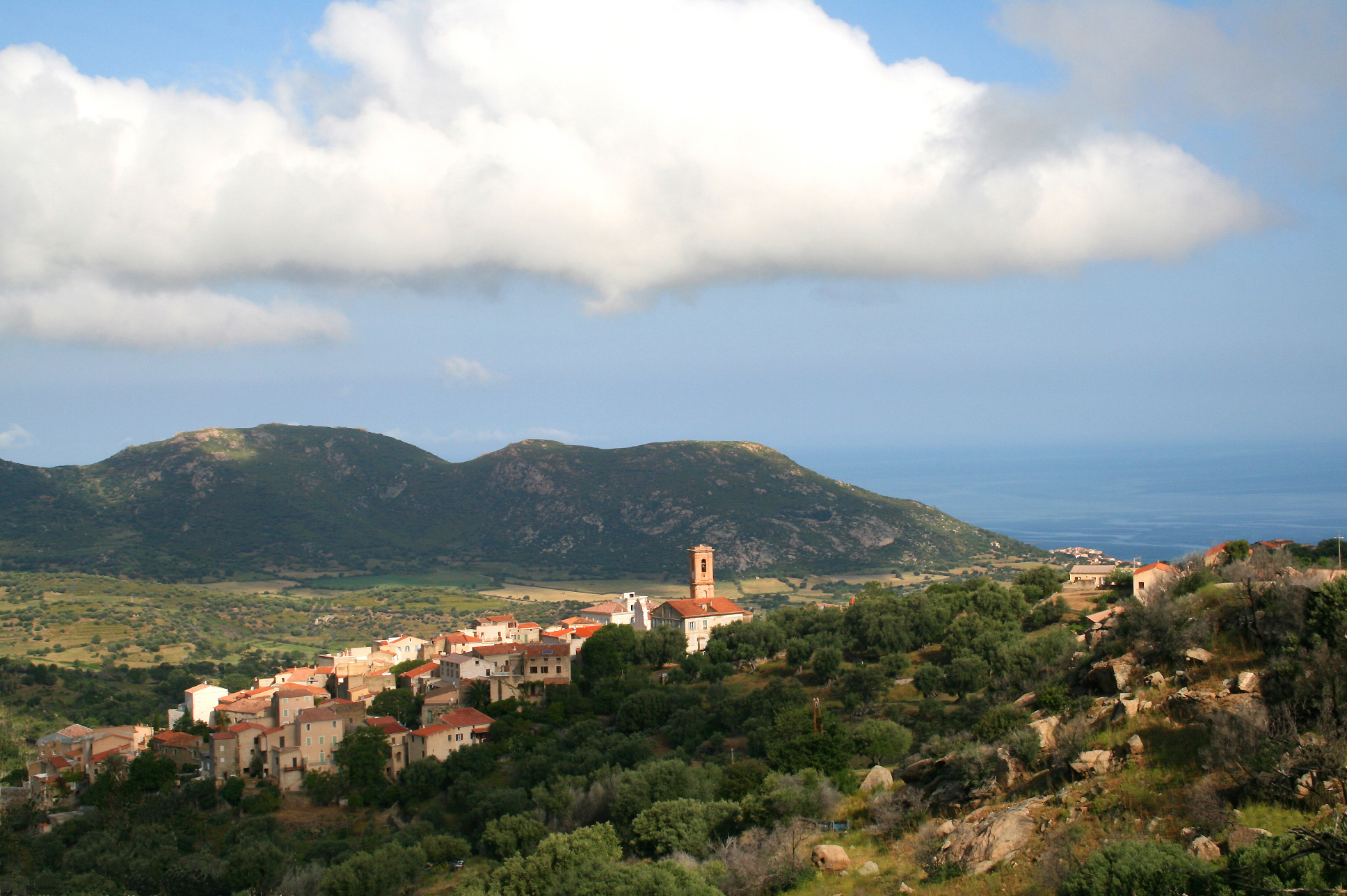
Cateri, the Balagne village, and the Mediterranean Sea

== See also ==
- Communes of the Haute-Corse department
